= Grahame Park =

Housing estate in London

Coordinates: 51.602°N 0.248°W

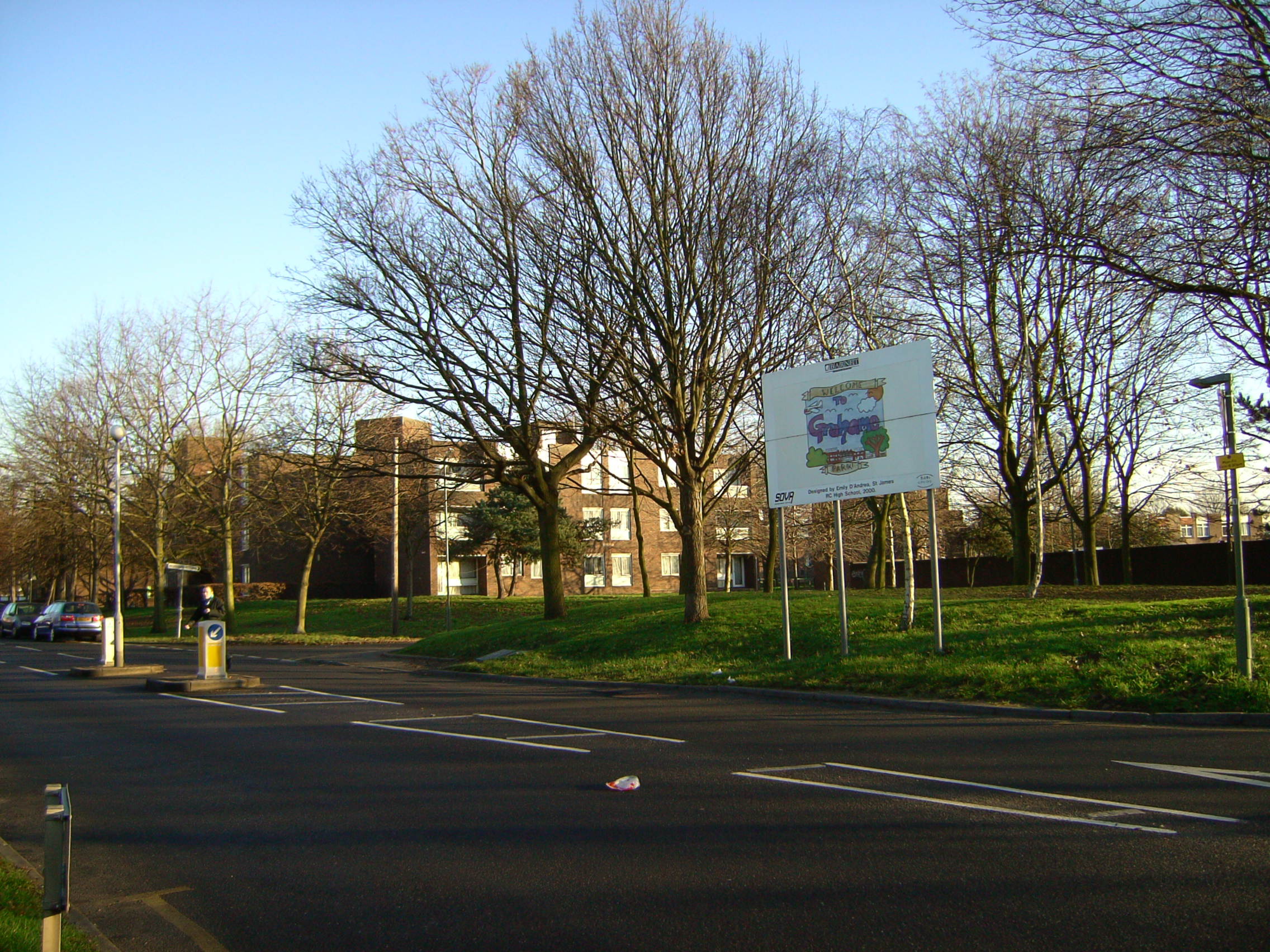
- The South entrance to the estate, looking towards Lanacre Avenue from Grahame Park Way

- Location within Greater London
- OS grid reference: TQ217905
- London borough: Barnet
- Ceremonial county: Greater London
- Region: London
- Country: England
- Sovereign state: United Kingdom
- Post town: LONDON
- Postcode district: NW4 NW9
- Dialling code: 020
- Police: Metropolitan
- Fire: London
- Ambulance: London
- London Assembly: Barnet and Camden

Grahame Park, located on the site of the old Hendon Aerodrome in North West London, is a north London housing estate in the London Borough of Barnet, including 1,777 council homes built in the 1970s.

== History ==
The estate is named in honour of Claude Grahame-White, the pioneer of aviation who established the original aerodrome and aviation school on the site.

The building of the estate was a joint project between the Greater London Council and Barnet Council. The plan was approved by the Ministry of Housing and Local Government in 1964, and the first family moved in on 23 October 1971. Sir Roger Walters was the Chief Architect and Gordon Wigglesworth was the Housing Architect.

A typical characteristic of the estate was the plain, square, brick terraced houses and long winding low-rise flats, with flat roofs, also known as "Brick Brutalist" style. Most building names, walkways and roads on the estate have names linked to the aviation history of the site.

Not all of the old aerodrome was sold off for development; the Royal Air Force Museum is situated immediately to the south-east of the estate (with free entrance).

A secondary road called Grahame Park Way, a typical 1970s-style collector road, runs along the eastern margin of the estate, parallelling the Midland Main Line (Thameslink) railway, and beyond that, the M1 Motorway.

The estate became the sole site of St James' Catholic High School, Colindale in 1996.

== Transport ==
Colindale station, on the Edgware branch of London Underground's Northern line, is within comfortable walking distance of at least the south-east corner of the estate. The next tube station north, Burnt Oak is also accessible. Mill Hill Broadway Thameslink station lies to the north, a bus ride away. Several bus routes run into or near the estate.

== Development ==
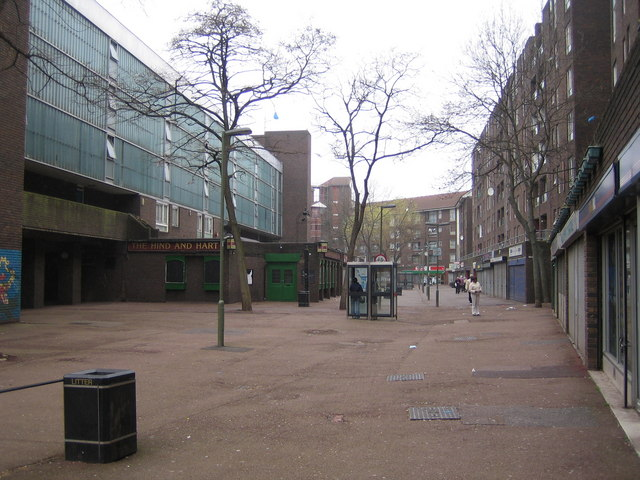
The Concourse, Grahame Park

In the late 1980s, the estate went through its first regeneration process, which split the blocks of flats into smaller blocks, by removing connecting walkways, and added pitched roofs to many of the buildings.

In 2003, residents voted in favour of a full regeneration of the estate. The Housing Corporation earmarked £15 million for the redevelopment.

The redevelopment is managed by Choices For Grahame Park, a subsidiary of Genesis Housing Association, with new houses being built by Countryside Properties.

In 2007 a website was launched by Countryside Properties, renaming part of the redevelopment as "New Hendon Village".

Colindale, including Grahame Park, has been designated by the Mayor of London in his London Plan as a 'proposed area of intensification'. As a result, Barnet Council designated a 'Colindale Area Action Plan' (AAP) and carried out public consultation events. The council has finalised its preferred plan in mid-2009, and it will be examined at a public hearing by the Planning Inspectorate, for anticipated approval by the Council in 2010.

=== Transport development ===
In early 2008, the London Group of the Campaign for Better Transport published a plan for an (unfunded) orbital light-rail service, the North and West London Light railway, through or near to Grahame Park.
