= Brent Cross =

Interchange and area in the London Borough of Barnet, London

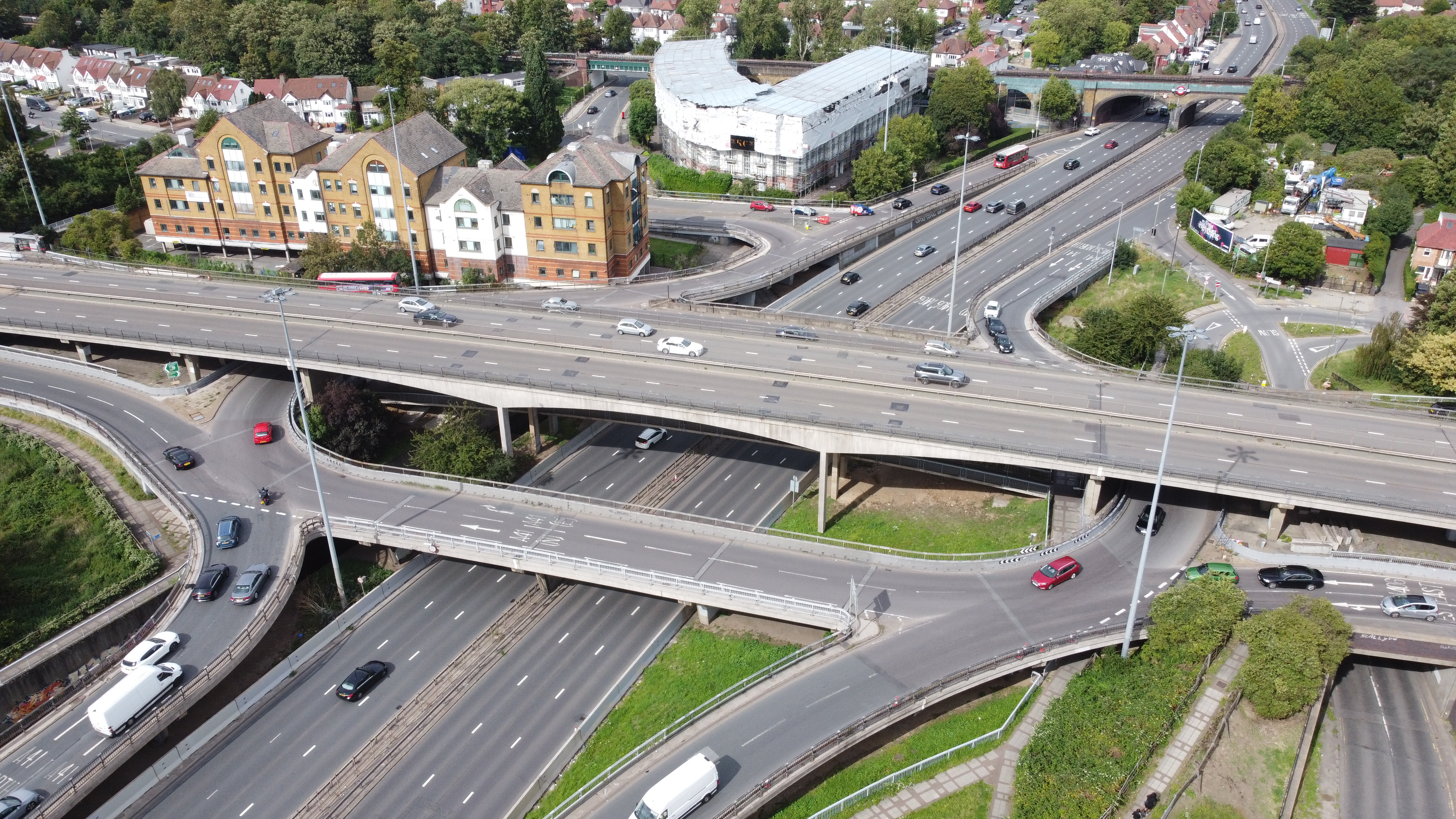
- Aerial view of the Brent Cross interchange, facing north
- Interactive map of Brent Cross

Location
- London Borough of Barnet, London
- Coordinates: 51.57679°N 0.21834°W
- Roads at junction: A41 (Brent Cross Flyover) A406 (North Circular Road)

Construction
- Type: Three-level roundabout
- Opened: August 8, 1965
- Maintained by: Transport for London

Brent Cross is a major traffic interchange and area in the London Borough of Barnet, England. Originally the name of a crossroads, it is located a mile from the centres of Hendon and Golders Green. Notably, the Brent Cross Shopping Centre, a major retail facility, was opened in 1976, just north of the interchange. The "Brent Cross Flyover" A41 runs to the east of the shopping centre over the A406 North Circular Road, while the M1 motorway and A5 Edgware Road are to the west at Staples Corner interchange. In addition, the Northern line (Edgware branch) and Thameslink rail routes run on viaducts.

The River Brent passes through the area, flowing from east to west in a man-made channel. The Shopping Centre falls within the NW4 postcode district; the Brent South Retail Park falls within NW2; and the Brent Cross tube station is within NW11.

== History ==
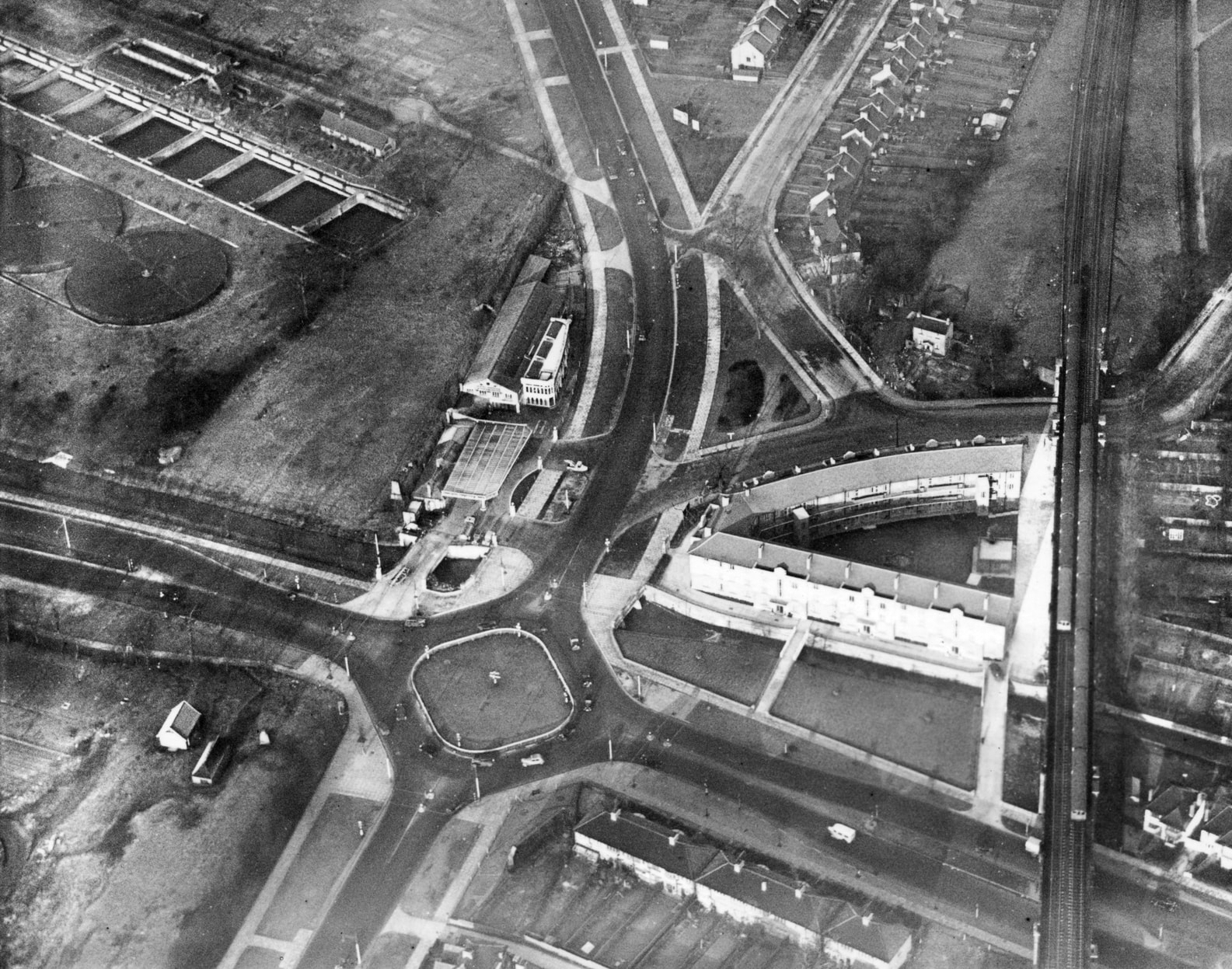
Original roundabout pictured from above in 1937, facing west

"Brent Cross" was originally the name of a crossroads in the vicinity of the current Brent Cross Flyover. By 1944, the term was being used to describe addresses north of the A406 North Circular Road and west of the A41 Hendon Way and after the eponymous shopping centre was built it was also used to describe business addresses south of the North Circular.

Previously the area had been known as Renters Farm, a name dating from 1309, and it remained largely farmland until the nineteenth century. In the late nineteenth century a sewage works was built there and Hendon Greyhound Stadium stood there from 1935 to 1972. In 1976 the Brent Cross Shopping Centre was opened, the first stand-alone shopping centre to be built in the United Kingdom.

In the 1920s and 1930s, two major roads through the area were constructed, the east–west A406 North Circular Road and the north–south A41 Hendon Way. In 1923 the Northern line (Edgware branch) was extended on a short viaduct over the River Brent.

In 1964–1965 the Brent Cross Flyover was built to carry the Hendon Way over the North Circular. During its construction, a fatal accident occurred on 20 June 1964 while erecting a large crane at the site. The crane jib buckled and collapsed onto a coach travelling east on the North Circular Road killing seven passengers on board. A question was raised in Parliament about the accident on 22 June.

Brent South Shopping Park, a 94,000-square-foot (8,700 m^{2}) retail park, was built in 2004. The park has 10 retail stores including Next, DFS and Sports Direct.

Whilst three-level roundabouts are compact and initially cheap to build, they have been criticised for their short lifespans, turning difficulties and limited capacity. Soon after construction, some engineers had concerns regarding the interchange. In October 2022, Transport for London (TfL) imposed a 7.5 tonne weight restriction on the flyover due to issues with the bridge's structural integrity. According to TfL, a £50 million investment from the Department for Transport would be required to complete a repair of the flyover, though some criticised the plans in light of other issues with TfL's maintenance of infrastructure. TfL issued contracts for renewal works in early 2024, with at least £2.5 million allocated to the project, not including £2.4 million spent on a feasibility study.

=== Brent Cross Town development ===
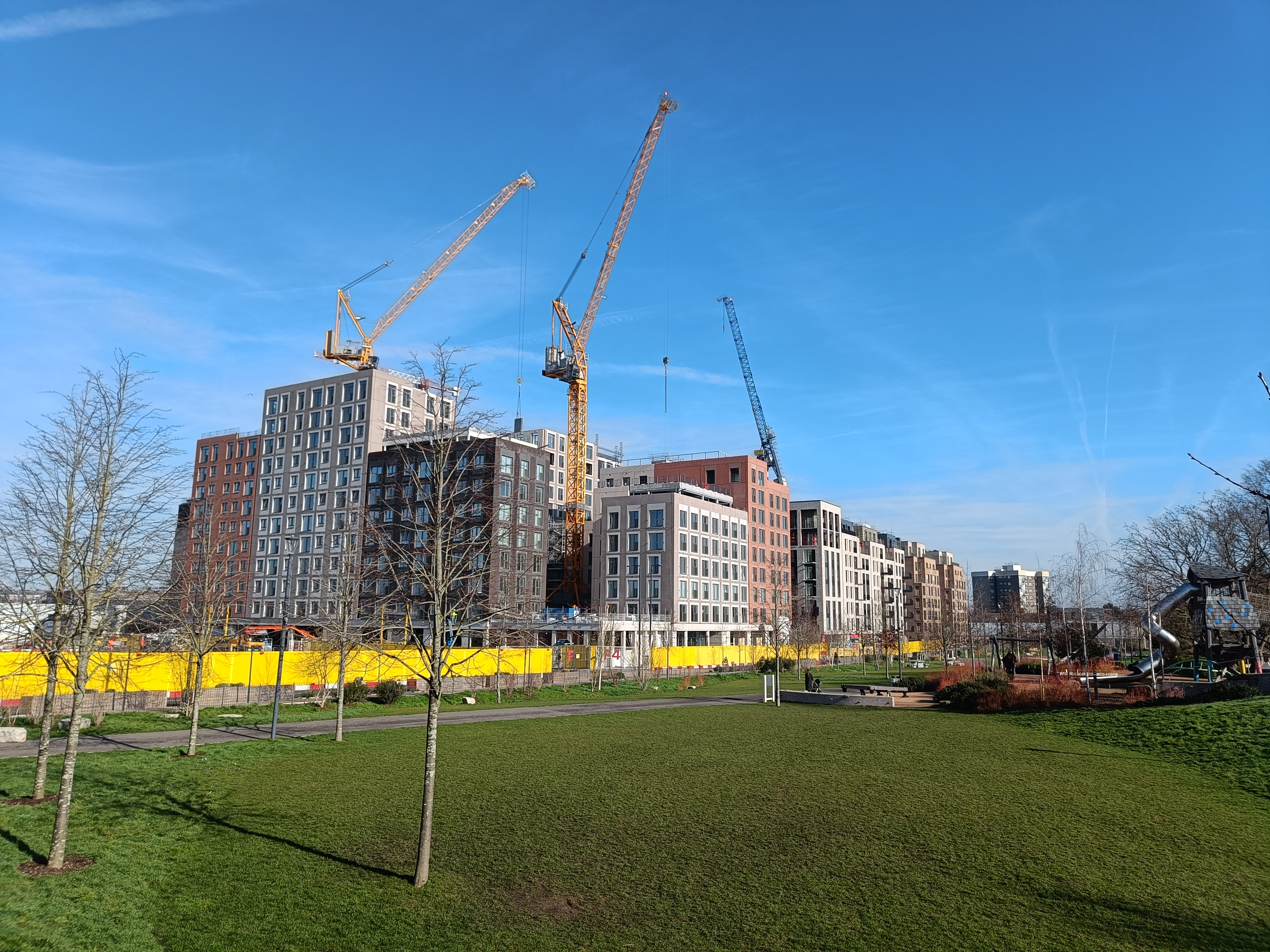
Brent Cross Town under construction in March 2025

Brent Cross Town is a planned new town centre development between Hendon and Cricklewood. The development is planned to cost around £4.5 billion to construct and will include 7,500 homes, 4,000,000 sq ft (370,000 m^{2}) of offices, four parks, transport improvements and a 592,000 sq ft (55,000 m^{2}) extension of Brent Cross Shopping Centre. The developers of the scheme are Hammerson and Abrdn. 200 new retail stores are included in the original plan. To counter the disruption of the area by the building works, the developers have offered to 'green up' the bridge over the North Circular and maintain it as a 'living bridge' making a horticultural contribution to the basic scheme. As market for new retail stores changes and demand is expected to decline with the shift to online shopping, BXS is changing its delivery plan and intends to focus on residential development first. Construction was planned to start in 2018 and be completed in 2021-22 but the retail development has currently been put on hold.

The London Underground stations nearest to the shopping centre are Brent Cross and Hendon Central, both on the Northern line. According to the council, both "feel very remote and lack adequate pedestrian links and signage", and the 10 to 15-minute walks are through "a hostile pedestrian environment.". The Brent Cross West railway station on the Thameslink line was built as part of the development, and other transport schemes have been proposed involving Brent Cross, as part of, or concurrent to, the Brent Cross Cricklewood development. These include measures promoted by the Brent Cross Cricklewood developers but the subjects of objections to their planning application, including:

- new bridges over the A406 North Circular, but the removal of another bridge
- moving the bus station closer to the A406 North Circular
- significant changes to the road network within and around the development.

== Gallery ==
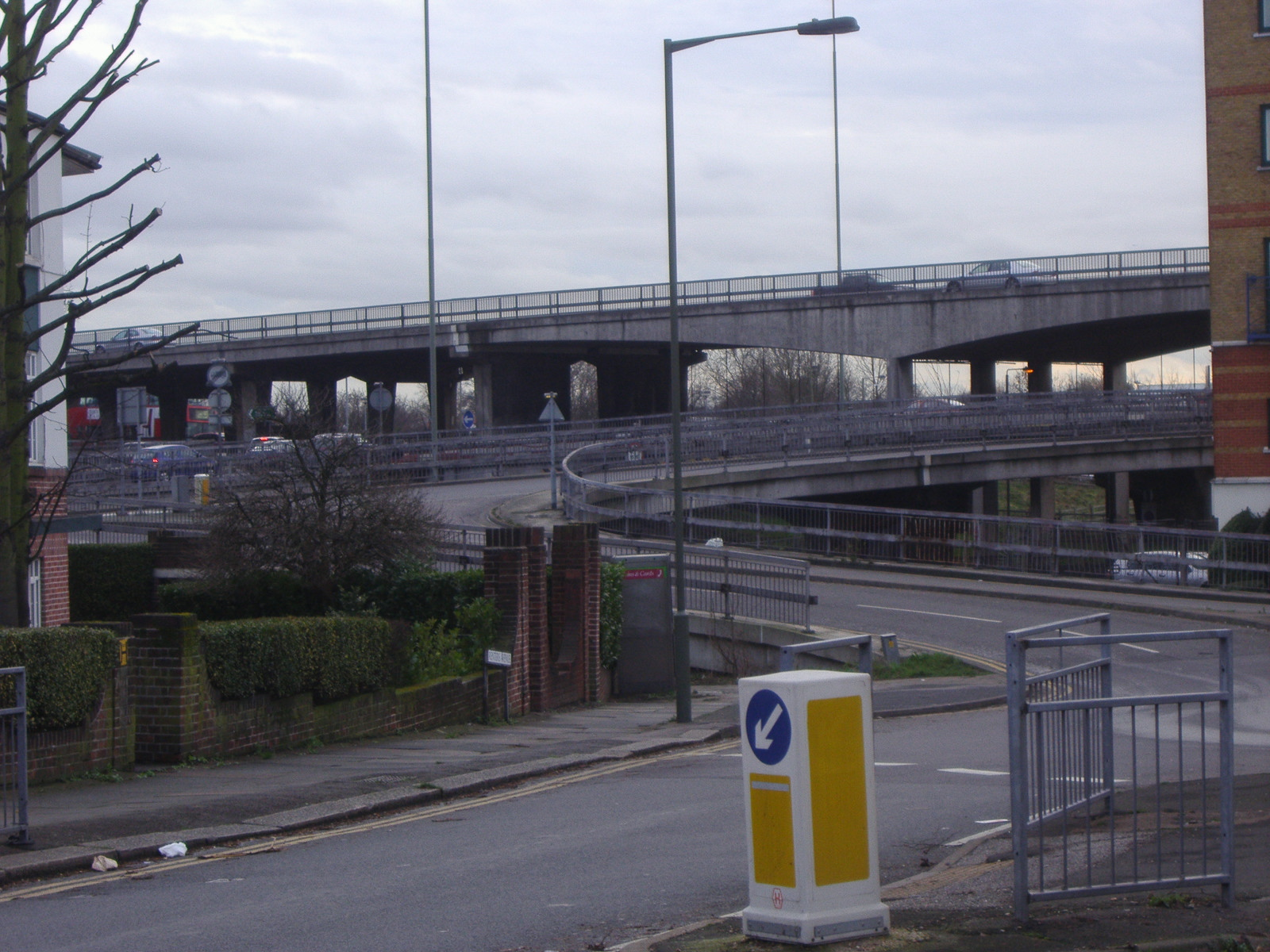
The A41 flying over A406 at Brent Cross

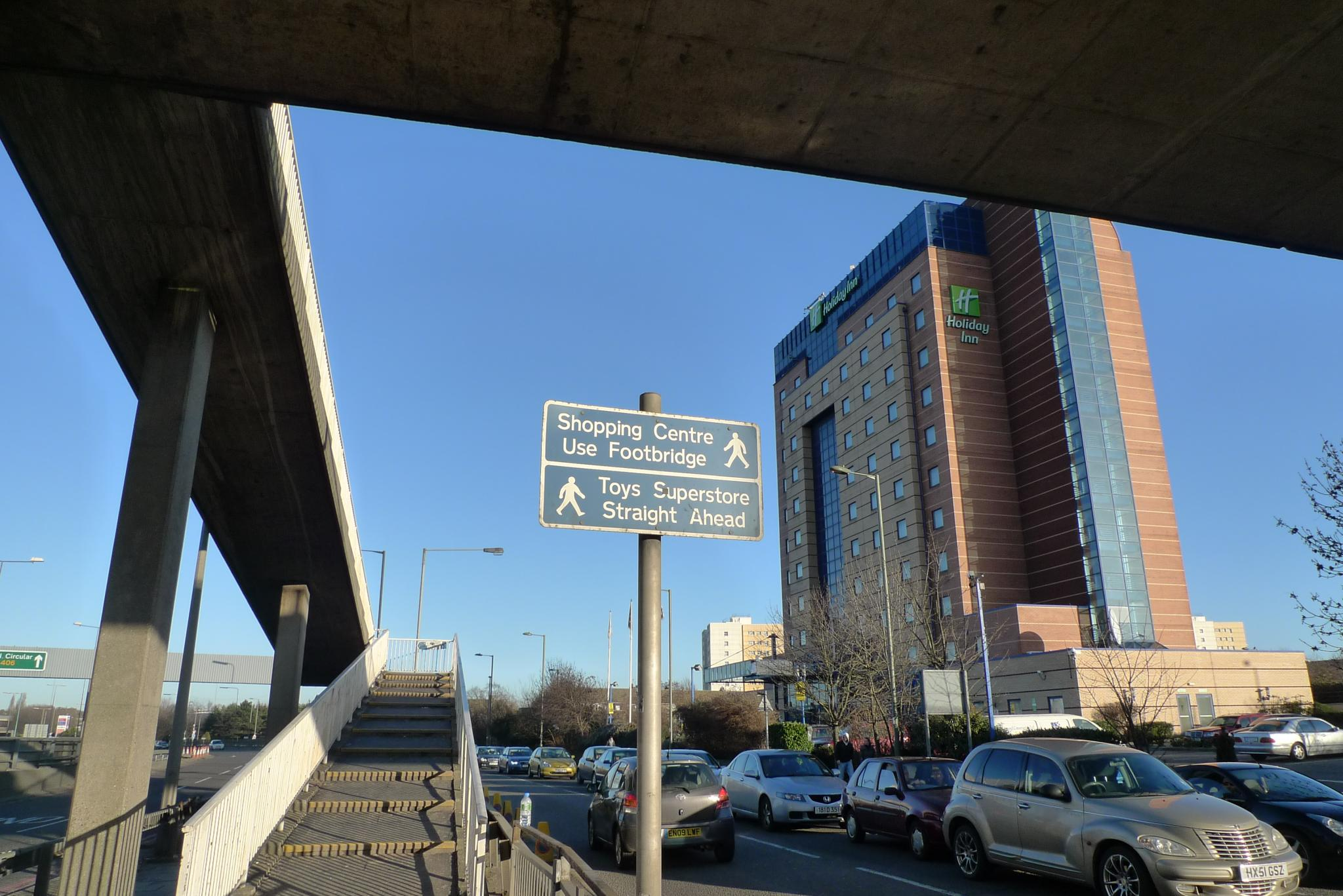
Holiday Inn at Brent Cross

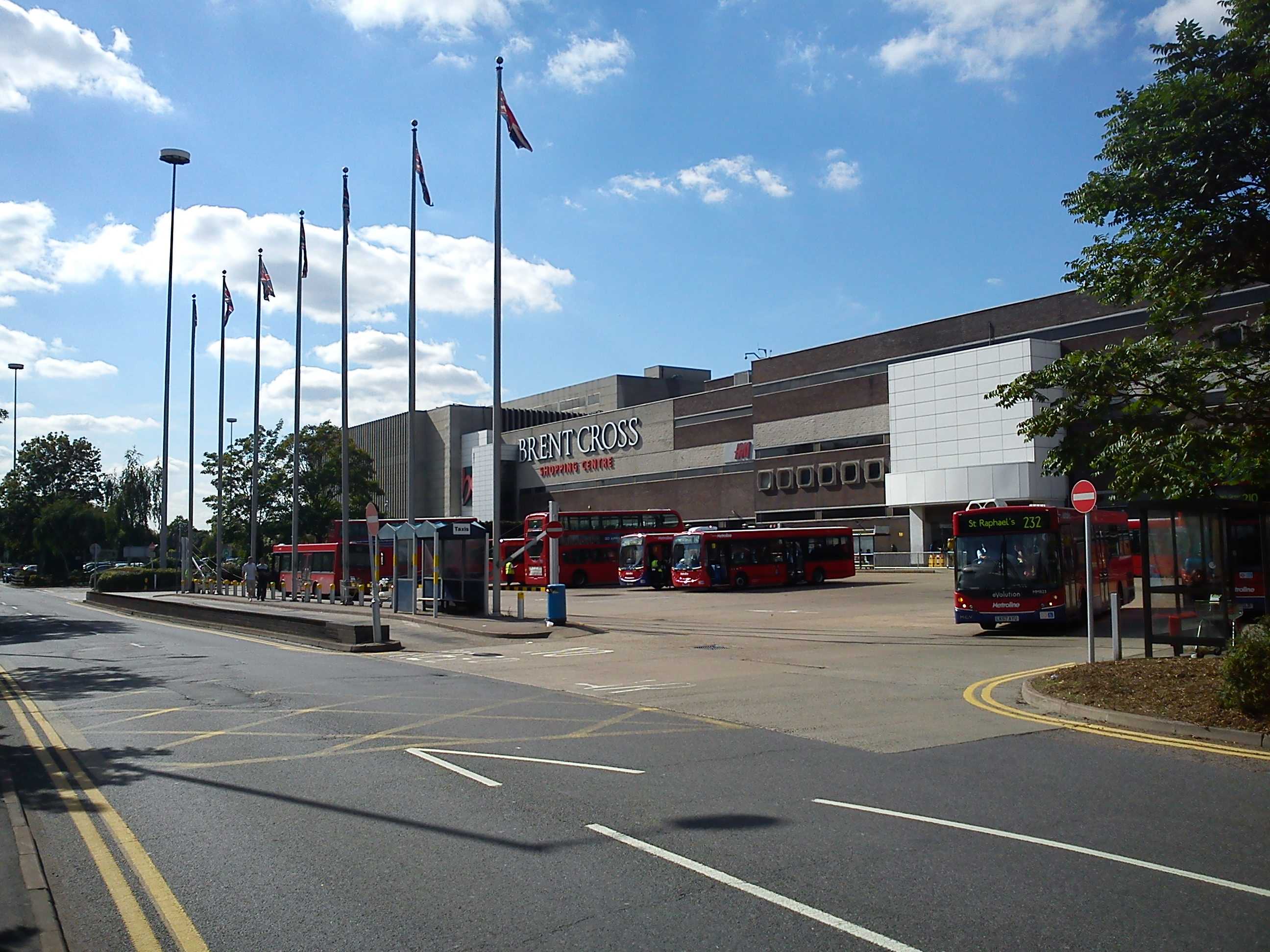
Brent Cross Bus Station
