= Stanley Heaps =

English architect

Stanley A. Heaps (1880–1962) was an English architect responsible for the design of a number of stations on the London Underground system as well as the design of train depots and bus and trolleybus garages for London Transport.

== Works ==
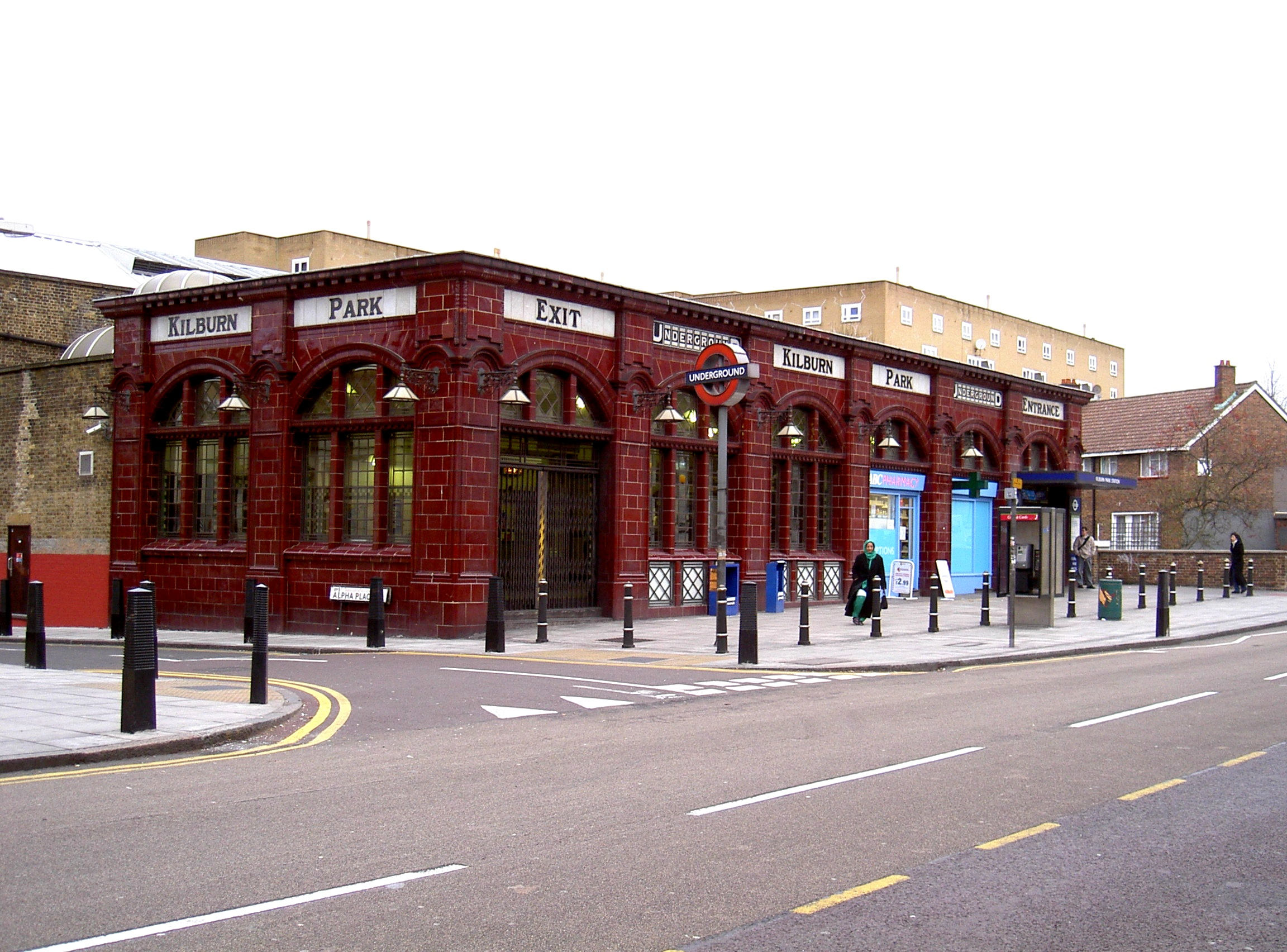
Kilburn Park Underground station

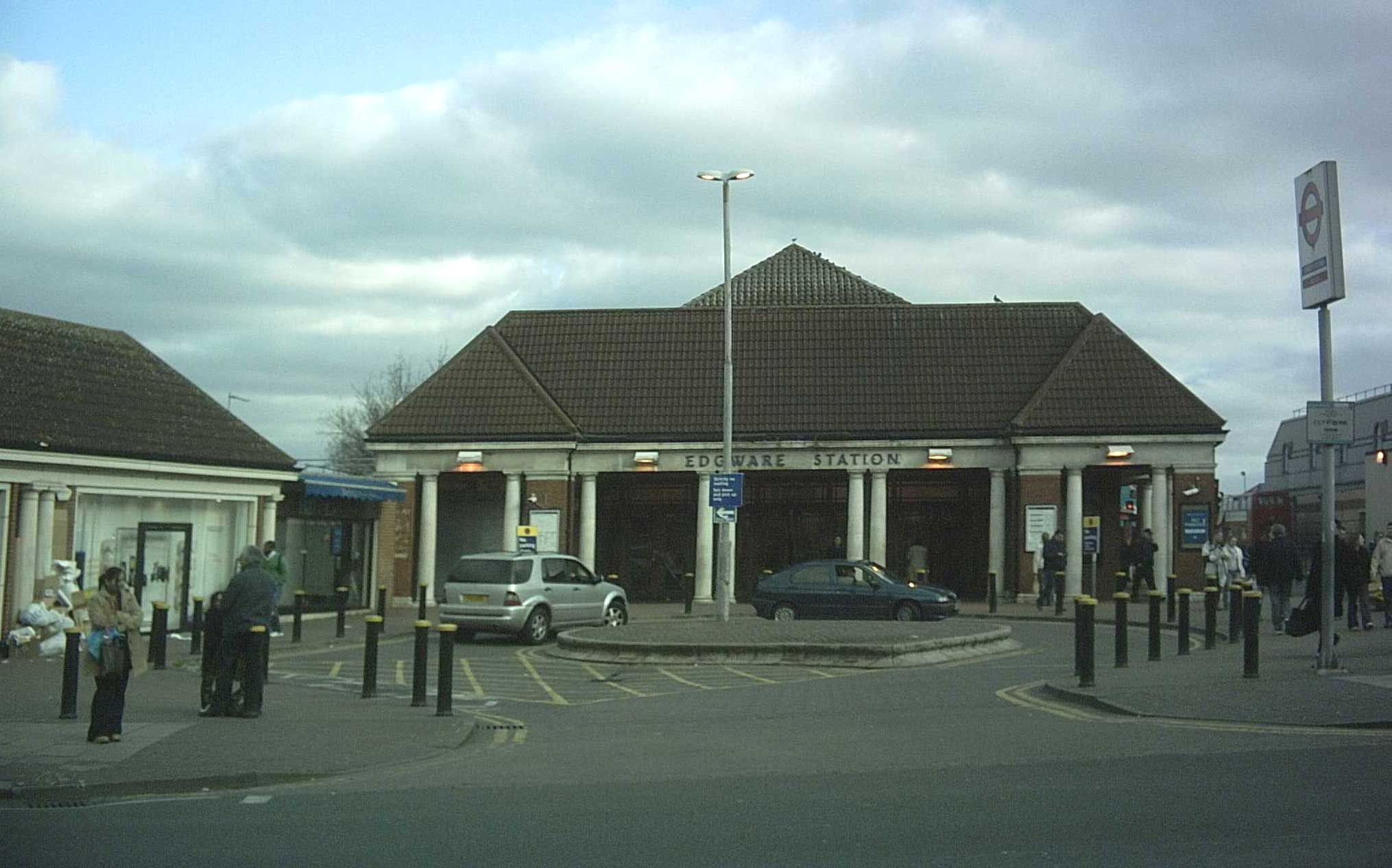
Edgware Underground station

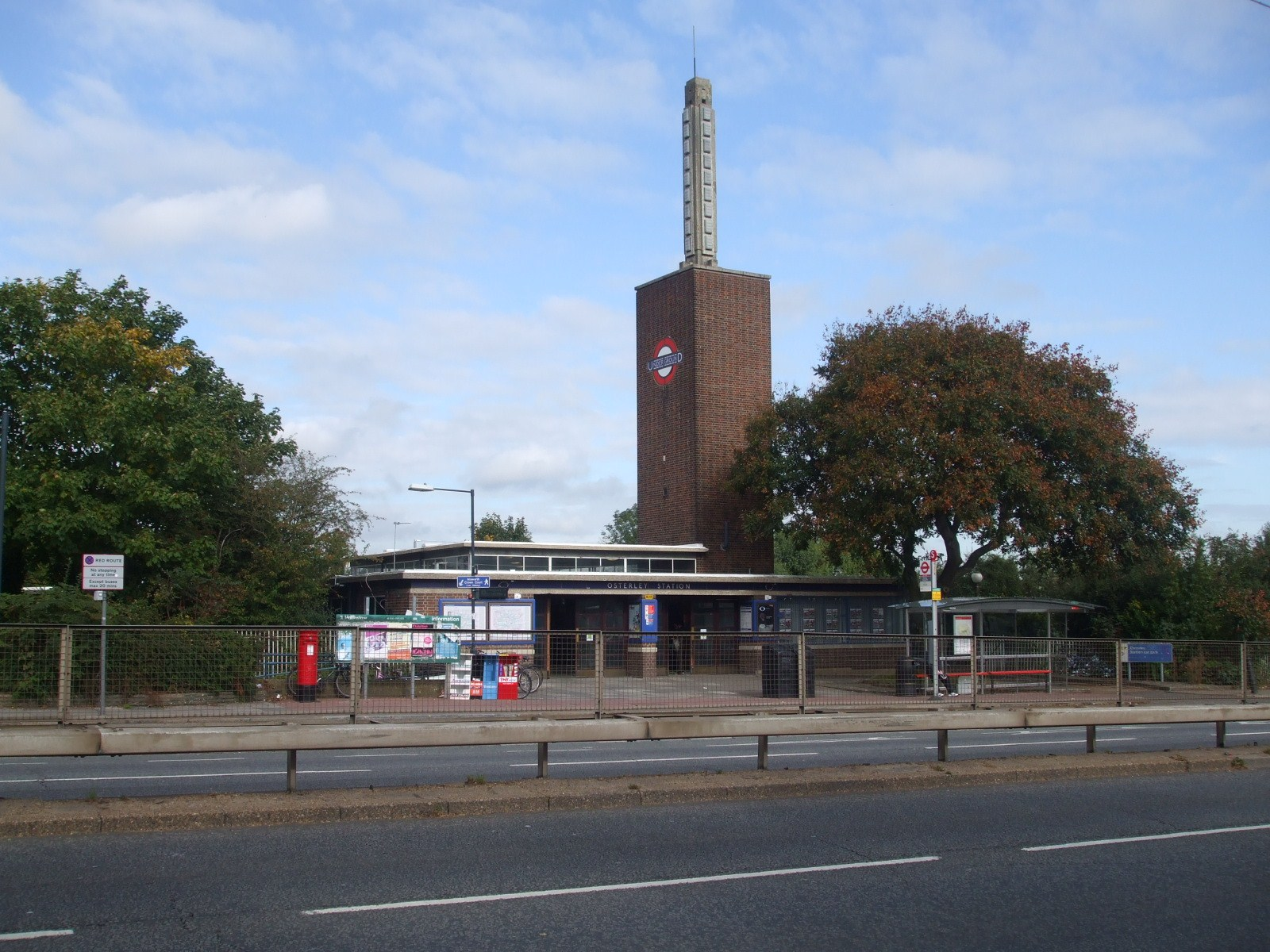
Osterley Underground station

In 1903 Heaps became assistant to Leslie Green the architect for the Underground Electric Railways Company of London (UERL) and aided him in the design of the station buildings for the Baker Street & Waterloo Railway (now part of the Bakerloo line), the Charing Cross, Euston & Hampstead Railway (CCE&HR, now part of the Northern line) and the Great Northern, Piccadilly & Brompton Railway (part of the Piccadilly line); all distinctive with their striking red glazed terra cotta façades and semi-circular windows at first floor.

Following the early death of Green in 1908, Heaps became the UERL's architect and produced designs for a number of new stations on the Bakerloo and Northern lines during the 1910s and early 1920s.

Heaps' first independent station designs were for the four new stations on the Bakerloo line extension from Edgware Road tube station opened in 1913 and 1915. Although not the first London Underground stations to be provided with escalators; Paddington, Warwick Avenue, Maida Vale and Kilburn Park were the first stations to be designed specifically for their use rather than use lifts as had the original Bakerloo line stations opened less than ten years earlier.

The station buildings designed for Maida Vale and Kilburn Park (Warwick Avenue is accessed by a subway and has no surface building and Paddington had only a small subway entrance) were based on the earlier Leslie Green design, using the same terra cotta tiling. Green's stations had been two-storey structures; the lift plant housed in part of the first floor level behind the characteristic semi-circular arched windows. By using escalators, Heaps' stations did not require a second floor to accommodate plant and they were designed as more modest single-storey buildings featuring tall windows each with a broad, tiled transom separating the curved top section to reflect Green's design.

In 1915 Heaps also designed a new frontage for the Central line's station at Wood Lane (closed in 1947 and now demolished). This featured mosaic tiled Underground roundels over the entrances similar to those installed at Maida Vale station.

After World War I, Heaps designed the stations for the 1923–1924 extension of the CCE&HR from Golders Green to Edgware. Unlike the Bakerloo line stations which had been built in well-developed central London, the five new stations for the CCE&HR were constructed in open countryside and the buildings were given a suburban style more in keeping with the new housing developments that were expected to grow around them. The buildings were built of brick with tiled pitched roofs. Four of the stations (Brent, Colindale, Hendon Central and Edgware) were given stone colonnaded frontages somewhat reminiscent of cricket pavilions. The fifth station, Burnt Oak (Watling), opened with a temporary building that was replaced in 1925 by a permanent building that was built without a colonnade.

Hendon Central station was quickly surrounded by and incorporated into a larger block of shops and apartments so that the simple elegant building can no longer be easily discerned. Colindale station was destroyed by a bomb in 1940 but was not fully replaced, in a new design, until 1962.

After the Edgware extension stations, Frank Pick the UERL's assistant managing director, wanted a more modern style for the set of new stations on the extension of the City and South London Railway to Morden. Pick commissioned the designs of these from Charles Holden, (Note: Holden's designs replaced a set by Heaps which Pick had found unsatisfactory.) who provided the designs for the majority of new Underground stations built in the 1930s. Heaps concentrated on the design of less noteworthy but nonetheless important depot buildings for trains and buses although he designed new stations at Osterley, Boston Manor, Dollis Hill tube station and St John's Wood. Heaps remained Chief Architect for the UERL and its successor London Transport into the 1940s. He worked throughout that period with the Underground's consultant architect, Charles Holden, on a number of stations including Hounslow West and Ealing Common.

During the Second War World Heaps served as director of construction at the Ministry of Aircraft Production.

== Notes and references ==
=== Bibliography ===
- Barman, Christian (1979). The Man Who Built London Transport: A Biography of Frank Pick. David & Charles. ISBN 0-7153-7753-1.
- Connor, J. E. (2001). London's Disused Underground Stations. Capital Transport. ISBN 1-85414-250-X.
- Day, John R.; Reed, John (2010) [1963]. The Story of London's Underground (11th ed.). Capital Transport. ISBN 978-1-85414-341-9.
- Wolmar, Christian (2005) [2004]. The Subterranean Railway: How the London Underground Was Built and How It Changed the City Forever. Atlantic Books. ISBN 1-84354-023-1.
- Karol, Eitan (2007). Charles Holden: Architect. Shaun Tyas. ISBN 978-1-900289-81-8.
