= ZGG =

ZGG could refer to:

- Zigong City name, in Sichuan province, China
- Golders Green tube station, a station on the London Underground with National Rail station code ZGG
- Zarubezhgazneftechim Trading GmbH, a subsidiary of Gazprom
