= Brent Cross tube station =

London Underground station

Brent Cross
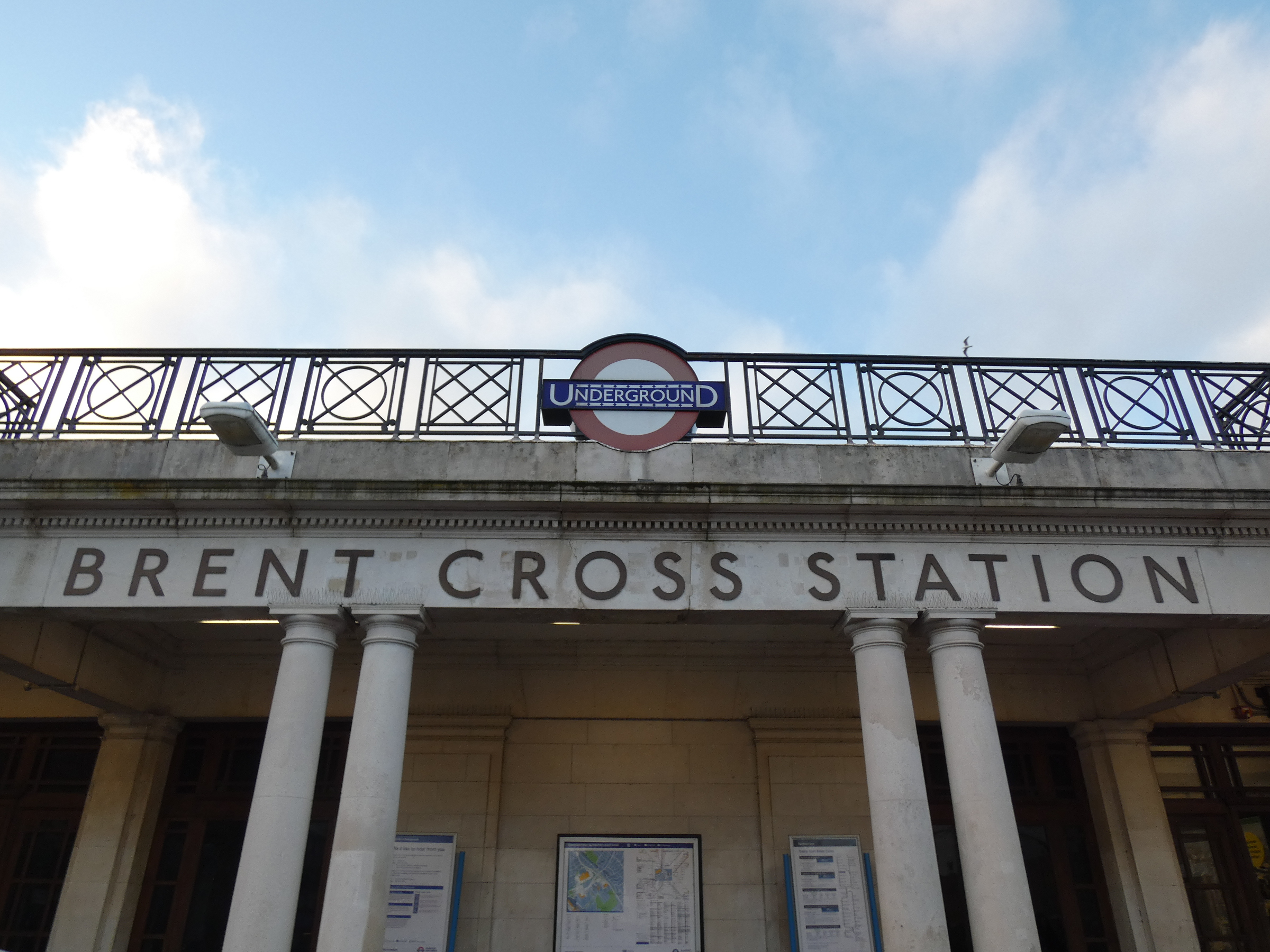
- Brent Cross station entrance
- Interactive map of Brent Cross

General information
- Location: Brent Cross
- Local authority: London Borough of Barnet
- Managed by: London Underground
- Number of platforms: 2
- Fare zone: 3

London Underground annual entry and exit
- 2021: ▼1.07 million
- 2022: ▲2.04 million
- 2023: ▼1.86 million
- 2024: ▼1.75 million
- 2025: ▲1.83 million

Railway companies
- Original company: London Electric Railway

Key dates
- 19 November 1923: Opened as Brent
- 20 July 1976: Renamed Brent Cross

Listed status
- Listing grade: II
- Entry number: 1401123
- Added to list: 20 July 2011

Other information
- External links: TfL station info page
- Coordinates: 51.57667°N 0.21361°W

Brent Cross is a London Underground station, located on Highfield Avenue in the Golders Green area of north-west London. It is a Grade II listed building.

The station is on the Edgware branch of the Northern line, between Hendon Central and Golders Green stations. The Brent Cross shopping centre is equidistant between this station and Hendon Central. It is in London fare zone 3.

== History ==
The station was designed by architect Stanley Heaps and opened as Brent, the name of the nearby river, on 19 November 1923. It was the first station of the extension of what was then known as the Hampstead & Highgate Line, which was built through undeveloped rural areas to Edgware.

The extension had first been planned prior to the First World War when the station had been due to be called "Woodstock". It was renamed from Brent to its current name on the 2 March 1976 opening of the shopping centre.

Two passing loops were built at the station, not long after it opened, to allow fast trains to overtake slower ones here, but these extra tracks were removed in the 1930s. The bridges over Highfield Avenue reflect this extra width, although both north and south of the station the alignment narrows again.

== Development ==
A planning application, registered in March 2008, for the nearby Brent Cross area would improve bus services passing the station. A turning circle for buses outside the tube station is proposed, needing the demolition of nearby housing.

In early 2008, the London Group of the Campaign for Better Transport published the North and West London Light Railway Proposal (q.v.) for a rapid transit scheme through the Brent Cross site, terminating at the tube station.

== Connections ==
A number of day and nighttime London Buses serve the station.

Preceding station	London Underground	Following station
Hendon Central towards Edgware	Northern line Edgware branch	Golders Green towards Battersea Power Station, Morden or Kennington
