= Burnt Oak tube station =

London Underground station

Burnt Oak
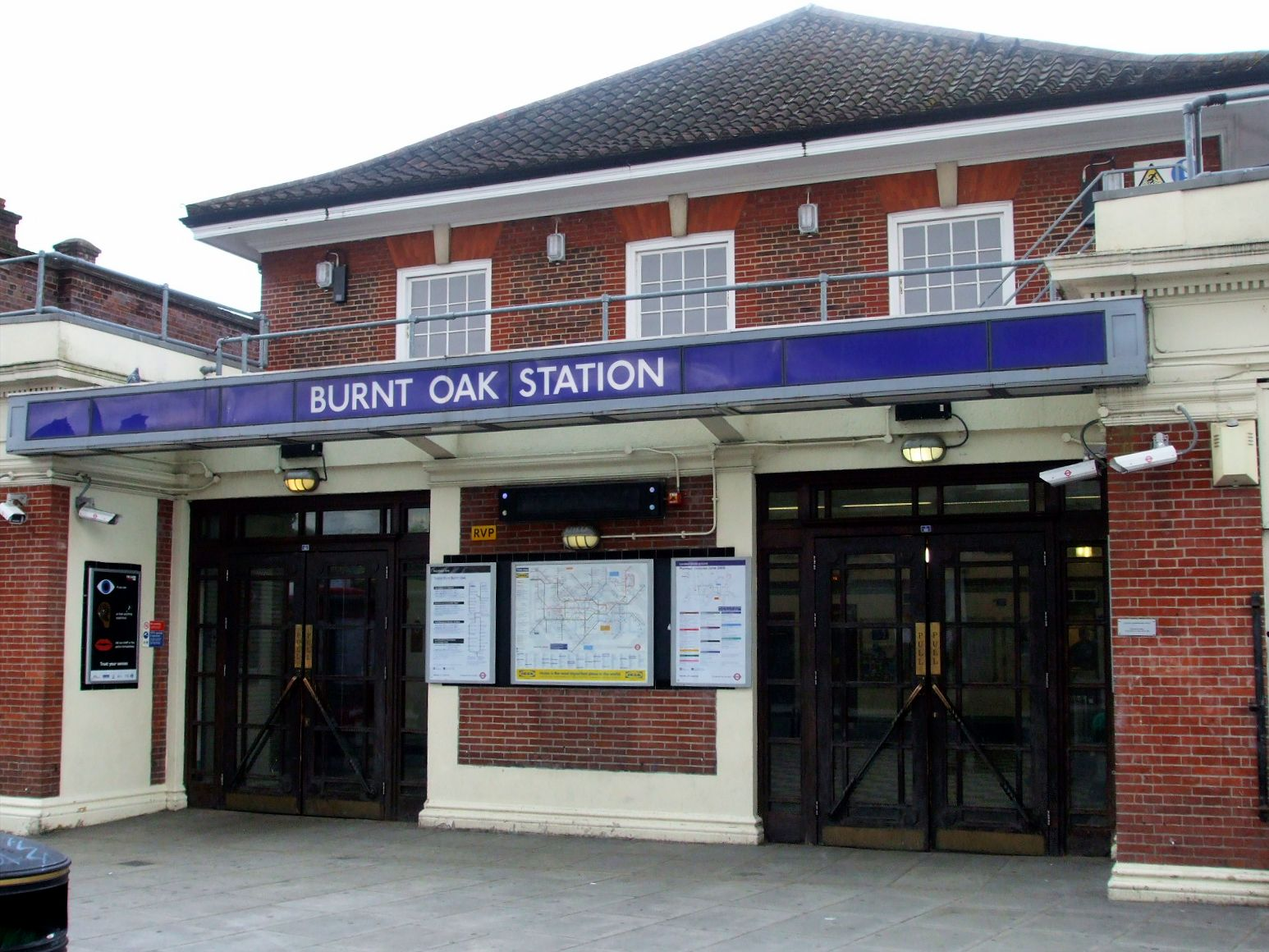
- Burnt Oak station entrance
- Interactive map of Burnt Oak

General information
- Location: Burnt Oak
- Local authority: London Borough of Barnet
- Managed by: London Underground
- Number of platforms: 2
- Fare zone: 4

London Underground annual entry and exit
- 2021: ▼1.91 million
- 2022: ▲3.11 million
- 2023: ▼3.06 million
- 2024: ▲4.49 million
- 2025: ▼3.07 million

Railway companies
- Original company: London Electric Railway

Key dates
- 27 October 1924: Opened as Burnt Oak
- c. 1928: Renamed Burnt Oak (Watling)
- c. 1950: Renamed Burnt Oak

Other information
- External links: TfL station info page
- Coordinates: 51.60278°N 0.26389°W

Burnt Oak is a London Underground station in Burnt Oak, a suburb of north-west London. It is located on Watling Avenue, off the A5 (the Edgware Road, originally a Roman road known as Watling Street). The station is on the Edgware branch of the Northern line, between Edgware and Colindale stations. It is in London fare zone 4.

== Location ==
Burnt Oak is on Watling Avenue, situated near the Burnt Oak Library, separated by the rail tracks. The station serves a moderate residential area. Rows of shops are along Watling Avenue. Barnfield Primary School, Burnt Oak Brook, Goldbeaters Primary School, Barnet Burnt Oak Leisure Center and Edgware Community Hospital are nearby.

== History ==
The station was designed by architect Stanley Heaps and opened as Burnt Oak (for Watling) on 27 October 1924, two months after the opening of the Hendon Central to Edgware extension of the Charing Cross, Euston and Hampstead Railway. For a while, the station was going to be named "Sheves Hill", and this name appears on a version of the Underground map from 1924. On a later version "Sheves Hill" is crossed out with "Burnt Oak" printed on the side. The station was originally provided with a temporary structure before the final ticket office building was constructed in 1925. The suffix was dropped from the name about 1950.

In 2018, it was announced that the station would gain step-free access by 2022, as part of a £200m investment to increase the number of accessible stations on the Tube. Work ultimately started in August 2026, with completion planned for early 2028.

In March 2025, a plaque was unveiled at the station to mark its centenary.

== Services ==
Burnt Oak station is on the Edgware branch of the Northern line in London fare zone 4. It is between Edgware to the north and Colindale to the south. The typical off-peak service, in trains per hour (tph) is:

- 20 tph northbound to Edgware
- 10 tph southbound to Morden via Bank
- 10 tph southbound to Battersea Power Station via Charing Cross

Preceding station	London Underground	Following station
Edgware Terminus	Northern line Edgware branch	Colindale towards Battersea Power Station, Morden or Kennington

== Connections ==
London Buses day and nighttime routes serve the station.
