= London Buses route 83 =

London bus route

83
- Metroline Wright StreetDeck Electroliner in Golders Green in October 2026

Overview
- Operator: Metroline
- Garage: Perivale
- Vehicle: Wright StreetDeck Electroliner
- Night-time: Night Bus N83

Route
- Start: Golders Green station
- Via: Hendon; Kingsbury; Wembley
- End: Alperton
- Length: 8 miles (13 km)

Service
- Level: Daily
- Frequency: Every 8-12 minutes
- Journey time: 34-71 minutes
- Operates: 05:30 until 00:59

London Buses route 83 is a Transport for London contracted bus route in London, England. Running between Golders Green station and Alperton, it is operated by Metroline.

== History ==
Twenty new Northern Counties Palatine bodied Volvo Olympians bought by First London for the route in 1999, were among the last non-low-floor buses bought for use in London.

In 2015/16, route 83 was the sixth-busiest TfL bus route, with 12.6 million passengers.

From 10 September 2016, the daytime service was withdrawn between Alperton station and Ealing Hospital and was replaced by route 483. The night service was renumbered N83 and continues to run between Golders Green station and Ealing Hospital.

On 26 August 2023, the route was extended from Alperton station to Alperton Sainsbury's, replacing route 79.

== Current route ==
Route 83 operates via these primary locations:

- Golders Green station
- Hendon Central station
- Hendon station
- West Hendon
- Kingsbury
- Wembley Park station
- Wembley Stadium station
- Wembley Central station
- Alperton station
- Alperton Sainsbury's
