= London Electric Railway =

UK rail company (founded 1910)

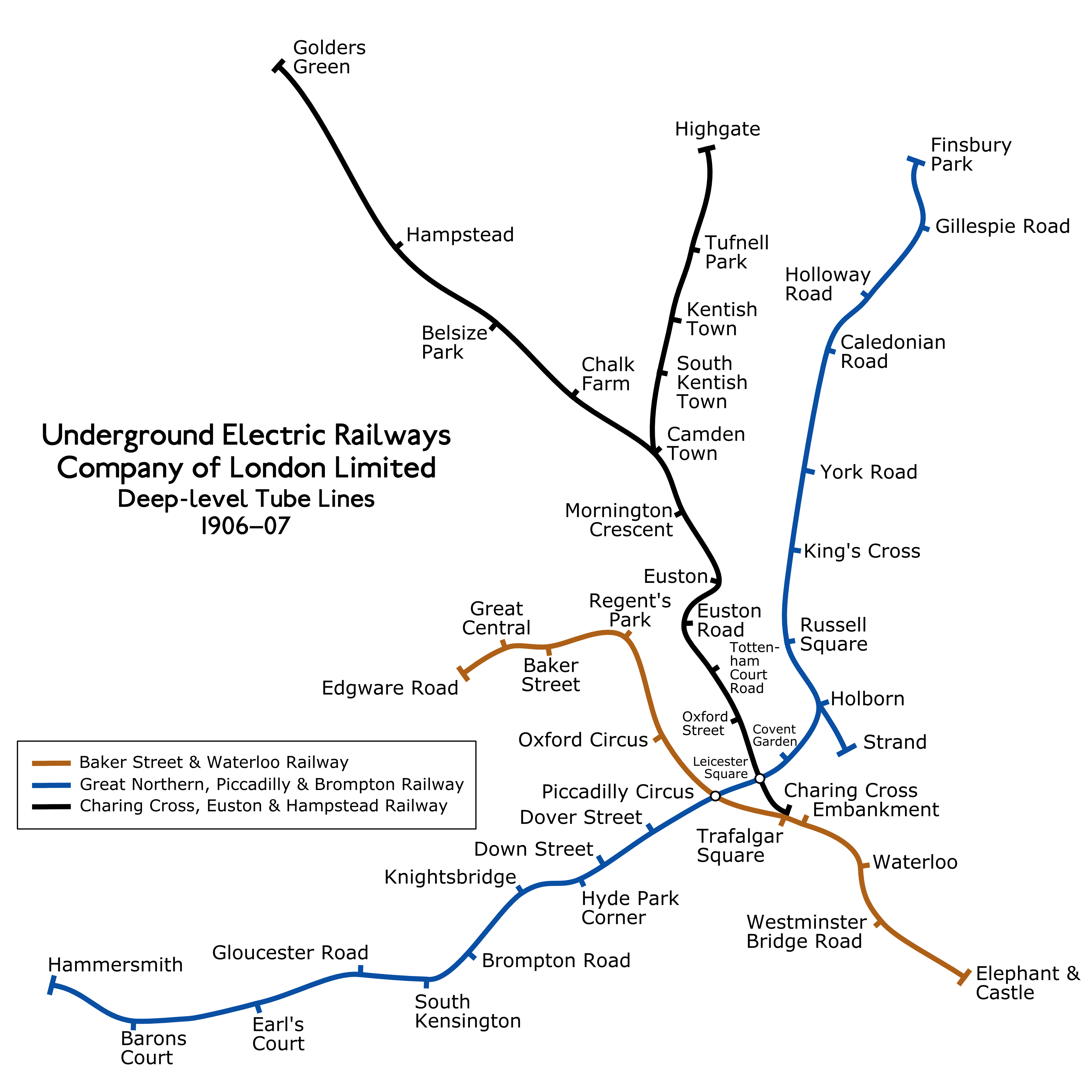
The UERL's three deep-level tube railways that were merged into the London Electric Railway

The London Electric Railway (LER) was an underground railway company operating three lines on the London Underground. It was formed in 1910 and existed until 1933, when it was merged into the London Passenger Transport Board.

== History ==
London Electric Railway Amalgamation Act 1910
- Act of Parliament
- Parliament of the United Kingdom
- Long title: An Act to amalgamate the Baker Street and Waterloo Railway Company and the Charing Cross Euston and Hampstead Railway Company with the Great Northern Piccadilly and Brompton Railway Company and to confer further powers on the Great Northern Piccadilly and Brompton Railway Company and for other purposes.
- Citation: 10 Edw. 7. & 1 Geo. 5. c. xxxii

Dates
- Royal assent: 26 July 1910

Other legislation
- Amended by: London Electric Railway Act 1911; London Electric, Metropolitan District, City and South London and Central London Railway Companies (Fares, etc.) Act 1920; London Electric Metropolitan District Central London and City and South London Railway Companies Act 1930

The LER was formed and owned by the Underground Electric Railways Company of London (UERL) in 1910 to combine the management of three of the company's subsidiary deep-level tube railway companies: the Baker Street and Waterloo Railway (BS&WR), the Charing Cross, Euston and Hampstead Railway (CCE&HR) and the Great Northern, Piccadilly and Brompton Railway (GNP&BR) which had opened in 1906 and 1907. The merger was carried out in accordance with the London Electric Railway Amalgamation Act 1910 (10 Edw. 7. & 1 Geo. 5. c. xxxii) by transferring the assets of the CCE&HR and the BS&WR to the GNP&BR and renaming the GNP&BR as the London Electric Railway.

Although the LER management was combined, the three lines continued to be identified separately for operational purposes as the Bakerloo tube, Hampstead tube and Piccadilly tube.

In 1912, in preparation for the extension of the Hampstead Tube from Golders Green to Edgware, the LER took over the Edgware & Hampstead Railway.

When the UERL and other transport operators in the London area were merged to form the London Passenger Transport Board on 1 July 1933, the LER was liquidated. The LER's routes now form the central sections of the Bakerloo line, Northern line and Piccadilly line.
