= Charing Cross roof collapse =

1905 railway station disaster in London

Coordinates: 51°30′26″N 0°7′25″W

The great railway catastrophy at the great London station (Das interessante Blatt, 1905)

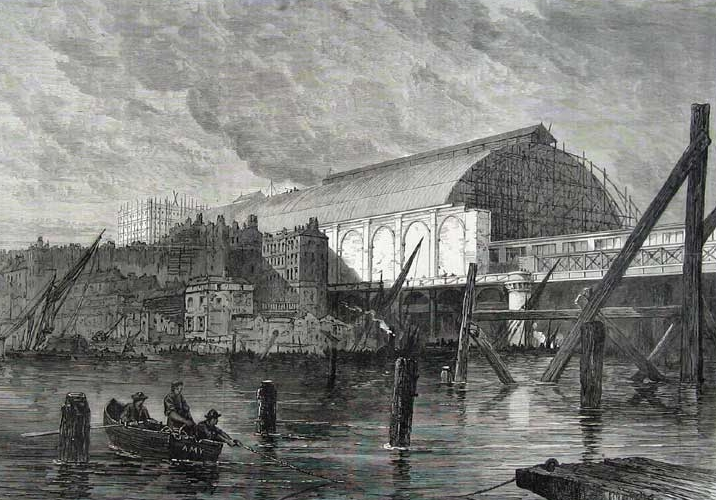
Charing Cross railway station nearing completion in 1864, showing the western sidewall and arched ironwork at the river end that collapsed in 1905

On 5 December 1905, the iron-and-glass overall arched roof of London Charing Cross railway station collapsed during a long-term maintenance project, killing six people.

== Background ==
The roof was designed by Sir John Hawkshaw and comprised a single-span trussed arch with wrought iron tie rods. The roof was 164 feet (50 m) wide and 510 feet (160 m) long and was designed as a contained arch, with bowstring principals.

== Collapse ==
At around 3:30 pm on 5 December 1905, one of the tie-rods of a main principal sheared, making a loud noise. Some passengers evacuated the station, although many remained.

At about 3:42 pm, two complete roof bays (about 77 feet (23 m)) fell onto the platforms and rails, and the western wall collapsed outwards on to the adjacent Royal Avenue Theatre (now the Playhouse Theatre), which was being reconstructed. The glass 'wind-screen' at the river end was also brought down.

There were four trains in the station at the time on platforms 3 to 6 and the girders and debris from the roof fell across them. Many passengers had already boarded the trains, otherwise the total killed could have been greater.

The apparent collapse of the roof was due to the structural failure of a flawed piece of ironwork. The roof had also been heavily loaded with scaffolding and materials just before the final collapse.

== Casualties and fatalities ==
Six people were killed, two of whom were working on the roof at the time. One fatality was an employee of W H Smith and the three remaining fatalities were workmen reconstructing the Royal Avenue Theatre which was crushed by the western side wall.

Eight other workmen were seriously injured and taken to hospital and nineteen others suffered minor injuries.

== Aftermath ==
The station was closed for over three months and during this period the Charing Cross Bridge was also examined and some girders added to reinforce it. The Charing Cross, Euston and Hampstead Railway company – now part of the London Underground's Northern line – was able to take advantage of this closure when constructing its Charing Cross Underground station, making a large excavation in the main-line station's forecourt that would not have been allowed otherwise. The previous intention was to have excavated upwards from platform level.

The Charing Cross roof was replaced by a utilitarian post and girder structure supporting a ridge and furrow roof. The curve of the original roof design can still be seen on the interior brickwork. The station was re-opened on 19 March 1906.

Because one undetected flaw caused such a large failure, questions were raised about the design and the safety factor against failure. A similar roof at Cannon Street station was taken down in 1958.
