= Hendon Central tube station =

London Underground station

Hendon Central
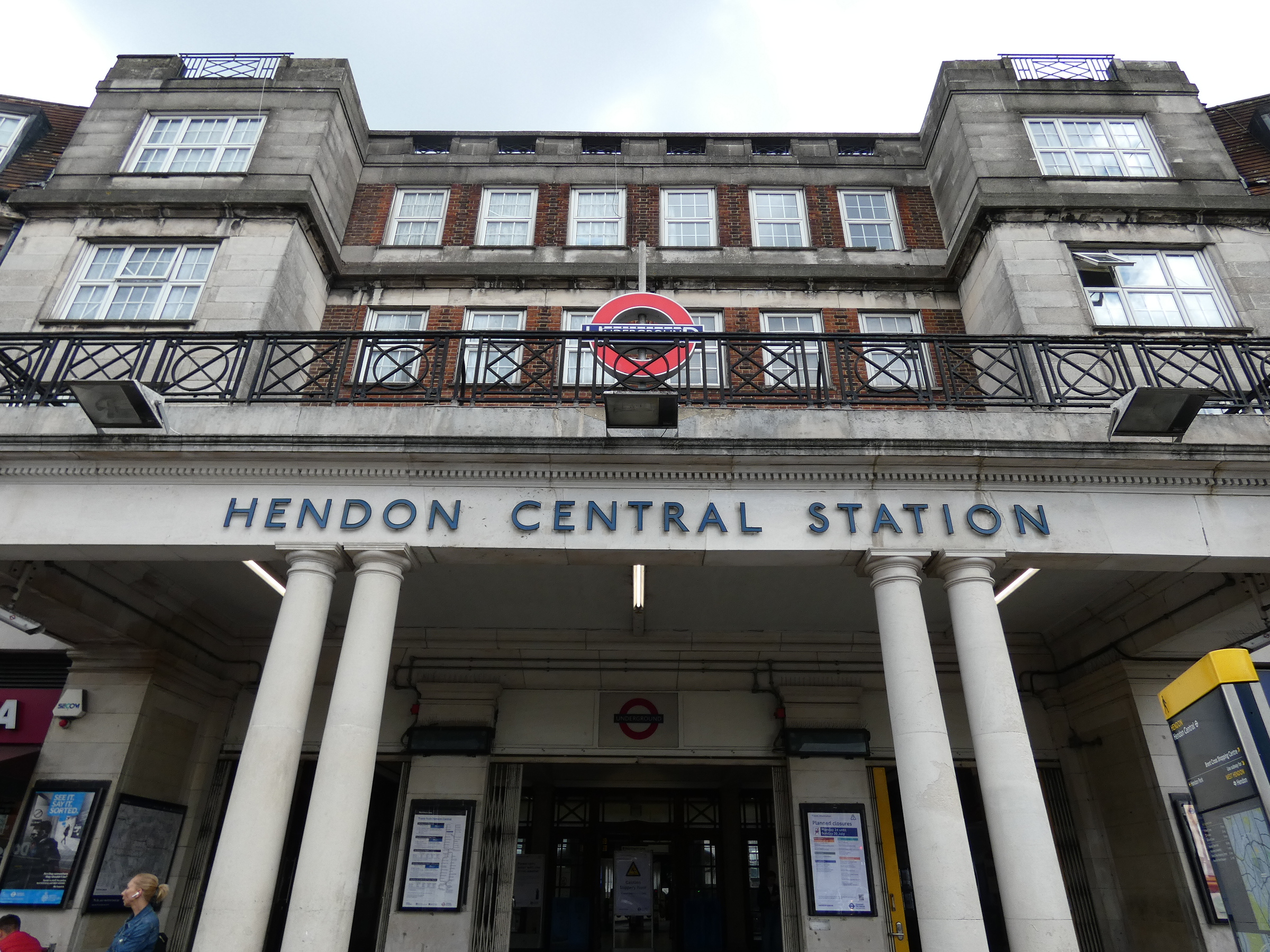
- Hendon Central station entrance
- Interactive map of Hendon Central

General information
- Location: Hendon
- Local authority: London Borough of Barnet
- Managed by: London Underground
- Number of platforms: 2
- Accessible: Yes
- Fare zone: 3 and 4

London Underground annual entry and exit
- 2021: ▼2.93 million
- 2022: ▲4.94 million
- 2023: ▲5.18 million
- 2024: ▲7.02 million
- 2025: ▼4.97 million

Railway companies
- Original company: Charing Cross, Euston & Hampstead Railway

Key dates
- 19 November 1923: Opened as terminus.
- 18 August 1924: Became through station

Listed status
- Listing grade: II
- Entry number: 1401082
- Added to list: 20 July 2011; 15 years ago

Other information
- External links: TfL station info page
- Coordinates: 51.583°N 0.226°W

Hendon Central is a London Underground station. It is located on an A41 junction in north-west London. The station is on the Edgware branch of the Northern line, between Colindale and Brent Cross stations. It is on the boundary between London fare zone 3 and 4.

The station was opened along with Brent Cross (then called Brent) tube station on 19 November 1923 as the first stage of an extension of the Golders Green branch of the Charing Cross, Euston and Hampstead Railway. The station served as the terminus of the line's western fork until 18 August 1924 when the second and final section of the extension to Edgware was opened.

== History ==
Hendon Central, like all stations north from Golders Green, is a surface station (although the tracks enter twin tunnels a short distance further north on the way to Colindale). When it was built it stood "in lonely glory amid fields", as one writer puts it, south of the old village of Hendon, which has since been swallowed up by London's suburbs. The station is a Grade II listed building, designed in a neo-Georgian style by Stanley Heaps, who also designed Brent Cross station in a similar style, with a prominent portico featuring a Doric colonnade.

The fact that the area was largely undeveloped allowed a hitherto unusual degree of coordination between the station and the surrounding buildings that were constructed over the next few years. The station was intended to be the centre and a key architectural feature of a new suburban town; it faces a circus 240 feet (73 m) in diameter that is intersected by four approach roads which provide access to all parts of Hendon and the surrounding areas beyond. For many years this was a roundabout known as 'Central Circus'; however it is now a crossroads controlled by traffic signals. Writing in 1932, William Passingham commented the integrated approach taken at Hendon Central as "an outstanding example of the co-ordination of road-planning with passenger station requirements." He noted, only nine years after the station opened, that it had already become the centre of an "ever-widening cluster of new houses" and accurately predicted that it would become "the centre of [a] small township", or what would now be called a suburb.

== Connections ==
London Buses routes 83, 113, 143, 186, 324 and 326 and night route N113 serve the station.

Preceding station	London Underground	Following station
Colindale towards Edgware	Northern line Edgware branch	Brent Cross towards Battersea Power Station, Morden or Kennington
