= Colindale tube station =

London Underground station

Colindale
- Entrance to Colindale Station
- Interactive map of Colindale

General information
- Location: Colindale
- Local authority: London Borough of Barnet
- Managed by: London Underground
- Number of platforms: 2
- Fare zone: 4

London Underground annual entry and exit
- 2021: ▼3.43 million
- 2022: ▲5.95 million
- 2023: ▲6.31 million
- 2024: ▼0.00 million
- 2025: ▲5.41 million

Key dates
- 18 August 1924: Opened (CCEHR)

Other information
- External links: TfL station info page
- Coordinates: 51.59556°N 0.25000°W

Colindale (/ˈkɒlɪndeɪl/) is a London Underground station in Colindale, a suburb of north-west London. It is on the Edgware branch of the Northern line, between Burnt Oak and Hendon Central stations. It is in London fare zone 4.

== History ==
The station opened on 18 August 1924 on the north side of Colindale Avenue, on what was then the 'Hampstead and Highgate Line', the first station of the second section of the extension to Edgware. The platforms were located underneath the east–west road, not just on one side, and the station had a classical style building designed by Underground Architect Stanley Heaps. The opening of the station spurred the development of Colindale.

T. E. Lawrence regularly used the station when he was stationed at the nearby Hendon Aerodrome, and it was the source of the pen name "Colin Dale" which he used to submit articles for The Spectator during 1927 and 1928.

Colindale tube station was severely damaged during The Blitz. At 8:45 pm on 25 September 1940 the station was hit by a large bomb. Two trains with a total of 400 people on board were at the station at the time of the explosion, and 13 people were killed. Nine rescue parties worked through the night to rescue the survivors, and the station was visited on 26 September by King George VI and Queen Elizabeth. A plaque in the ticket hall notes the event.

The simple temporary timber structure erected after the bombing actually lasted longer than the original building as it was not replaced until 1962 when a new building was constructed incorporating shops. As part of the removal of Colindale Station House in the mid 2010s, the 1962 building was reclad.

=== Station rebuild ===
Since 2010, over 6,000 homes have been built in Colindale, including the redevelopment of the Hendon Police College. Barnet Council noted in 2019 that the use of the station had risen by 88% since 2009, and the population of Colindale ward had grown by 70%. Areas around the station were planned for substantial redevelopment, with over 10,000 new homes.

As part of the regeneration, agreement was reached between Barnet Council, Transport for London, property developers and the HM Government Levelling Up Fund to fund a new station building along with step-free access, built at a cost of £30 million. Designed by BDP, the design was inspired by the Hendon Aerodrome, which closed in the 1960s. The new station building would replace the 1960s ticket hall, albeit located over the tracks rather than built to the side, as at present. Two large towers with 300 new homes will also be built directly adjacent to the new station building.

Consultation took place in 2018, with planning approval for the new station building in 2019. Funding approval from HM Government was received in January 2024. In February 2024, it was announced that the station would close temporarily from Friday 7 June 2024 until December 2024 to allow construction work to take place. The station reopened in December 2024 after completion of phase 1 – the staircase was reconstructed but the new entrance was completed on 22 December 2025.

== Attractions ==
The Royal Air Force Museum London is a popular destination for travellers going to Colindale. Located on the site of the former Hendon Aerodrome, the museum is around a ten minutes walk from the station.

The British Library Newspaper Library was situated in Colindale until 2013. The Colindale tube station was also a popular destination for travellers intending to reach the shopping centre of Oriental City up until its closure.

== Terminus ==
The station is sometimes used as a terminus for trains travelling north, instead of them continuing to Edgware. Some regular off-peak service patterns in recent years have seen all trains joining the Edgware branch from the Bank branch terminating at Colindale. However, this was not the pattern in 2009. Reversal of trains at this station makes use of a turn-back siding, situated between the running lines north of the station.

== Connections ==
London Buses routes 125, 204, 303 and night route N5 serve the station.

Preceding station	London Underground	Following station
Burnt Oak towards Edgware	Northern line Edgware branch	Hendon Central towards Battersea Power Station, Morden or Kennington
