= Golders Green tube station =

London Underground station

Golders Green
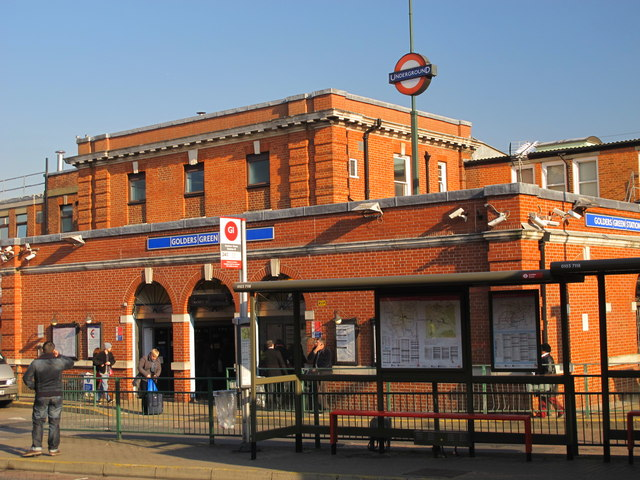
- Golders Green station
- Interactive map of Golders Green

General information
- Location: Golders Green
- Local authority: London Borough of Barnet
- Managed by: London Underground
- Number of platforms: 5
- Tracks: 3
- Accessible: Yes
- Fare zone: 3

London Underground annual entry and exit
- 2020: ▼3.90 million
- 2021: ▼3.33 million
- 2022: ▲5.79 million
- 2023: ▲6.03 million
- 2024: ▲6.24 million

Key dates
- 22 June 1907: Opened as terminus (CCE&HR)
- 19 November 1923: Became through station (CCE&HR)

Other information
- External links: TfL station info page
- Coordinates: 51.572°N 0.194°W

Golders Green is a London Underground station in Golders Green, London. It is on the Edgware branch of the Northern line, between Brent Cross and Hampstead stations. The station is located at the crossroads of Finchley Road (A598) and Golders Green Road/North End Road (A502). The station exit is adjacent to Golders Green bus station; a former exit to Finchley Road is now closed. Adjacent to the station is the Golders Green Hippodrome, home to the BBC Concert Orchestra for many years and now the headquarters of a religious organisation. It is in London fare zone 3.

== History ==
Golders Green station was opened by the Charing Cross, Euston & Hampstead Railway (CCE&HR, now part of the Northern line) on 22 June 1907. It was one of the railway's two northern terminals (the other being at Archway) and was also the site of the railway's depot. At the beginning of the 20th century Golders Green was a small rural hamlet with only a few houses, but the opening of the railway stimulated a rapid building boom causing the number of houses and the population to increase greatly.

To the south of the station in the tunnels beneath Hampstead Heath is the partially built but uncompleted North End or Bull & Bush station.

Before the First World War plans were made to extend the CCE&HR north from Golders Green to Hendon and Edgware to open up new areas of the Middlesex countryside to development and to create a source of new passengers. The war postponed the construction of the extension and work did not begin until 12 June 1922. The first section of the extension, as far as Hendon Central, opened on 19 November 1923.

Golders Green was the last station on the Northern line to retain semaphore signals, replaced in 1950.

== Today ==
The station has three tracks running through it which serve a side platform and two island platforms. The platforms are numbered 1 to 5 with numbers 1 and 2 serving each side of one track and 3 and 4 serving each side of another. Platform 1 (the northbound side platform) is not presently in public use, as it is used by London Underground staff. Platforms 3 and 4 are used for trains terminating at Golders Green, which may then reverse back into London, but this is uncommon, and trains that start at Golders Green Depot continue to Hampstead Station to make their first stop.

Two new lifts were installed during 2008, one on platform 2/3 and one on platform 4/5 to provide step-free access to the platforms. Ticket barriers are in operation.

== Connections ==
London Buses routes 13, 83, 102, 139, 183, 210, 226, 240, 245, 260, 268, 328, 460, H2, H3, school route 631 and night routes N5 and N83 serve the station. Several National Express coaches also serve the station.

Preceding station	London Underground	Following station
Brent Cross towards Edgware	Northern line Edgware branch	Hampstead towards Battersea Power Station, Morden or Kennington
Abandoned works
Terminus	Northern line	North End towards Charing Cross
