= Edgware tube station =

London Underground station

Edgware
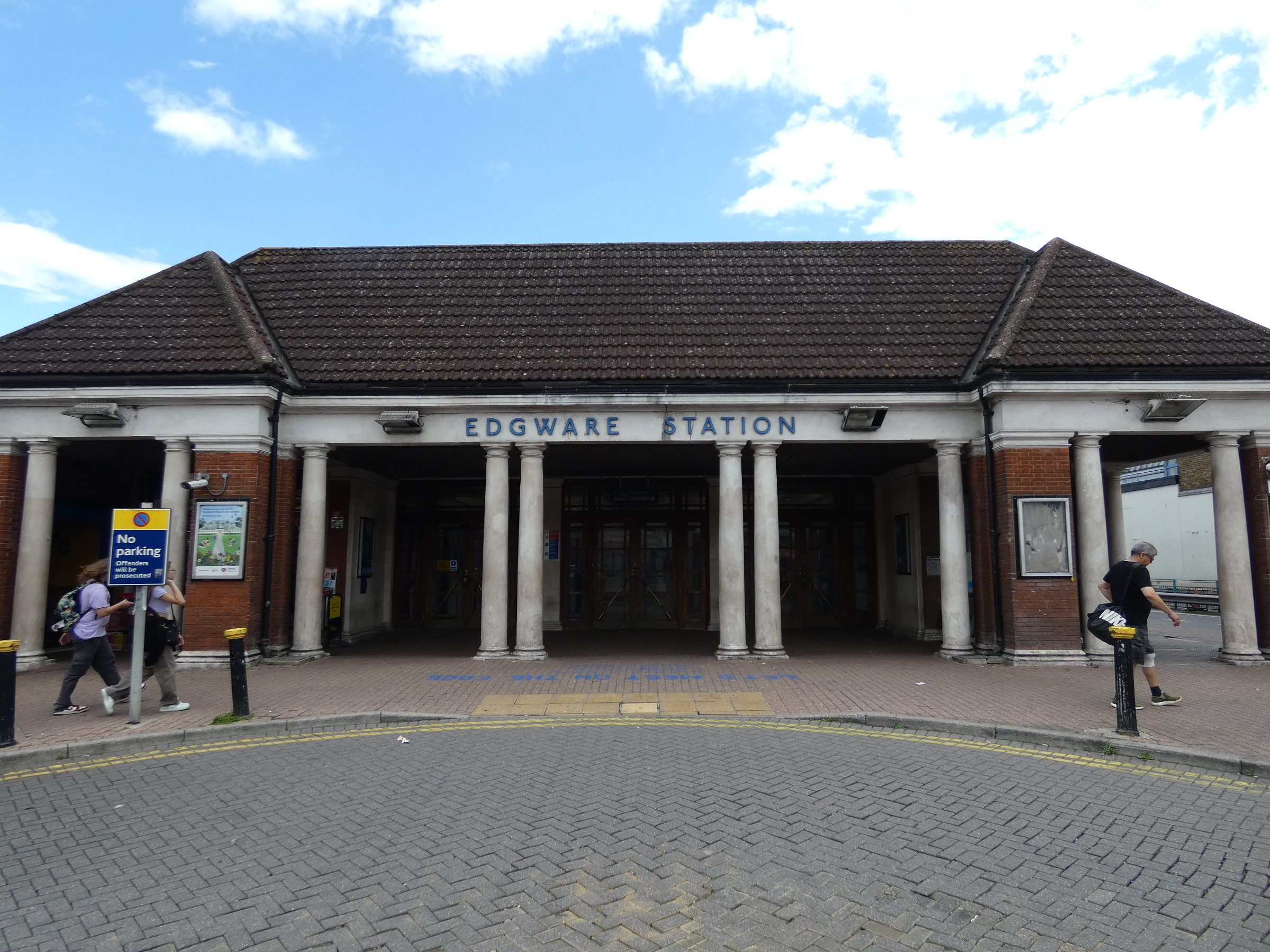
- Edgware station entrance
- Interactive map of Edgware

General information
- Location: Edgware
- Local authority: London Borough of Barnet
- Managed by: London Underground
- Number of platforms: 3
- Accessible: Yes
- Fare zone: 5

London Underground annual entry and exit
- 2021: ▼2.28 million
- 2022: ▲3.93 million
- 2023: ▲4.04 million
- 2024: ▼3.86 million
- 2025: ▲4.15 million

Key dates
- 18 August 1924: Opened (CCE&HR)

Other information
- External links: TfL station info page
- Coordinates: 51.614°N 0.275°W

Edgware (/ˈɛdʒwɛər/) is a London Underground station in Edgware, in the London Borough of Barnet. It is the northern terminus on its branch of the Northern line and the next station towards south is Burnt Oak. It is in London fare zone 5.

== Location ==
The station is located on Station Road, Edgware (part of the A5100). This road runs north-east from the High Street (A5), and the station is situated about 500 metres from the A5 on the right (south-east) side. The building is set back from the road, and there is a circular service road between the building and the road to allow cars to pull in and pick up or set down.

Just to the right of the station, viewed from Station Road, is a road to the bus station and bus garage.

The Broadwalk Centre can be easily accessed from the station, there is a footpath that leads directly to the Broadwalk carpark and commuter carpark.

== History ==
The station was opened on 18 August 1924 as the terminus of the second phase of the Underground Group's extension of the Charing Cross, Euston & Hampstead Railway from Golders Green. It was designed by architect Stanley Heaps. There are three platforms, an island lying east of a single platform (platform 1). A trainshed covers the island platforms (2 and 3).

Despite having already had a railway station since 1867 (Edgware station on the London and North Eastern Railway), Edgware was, in 1924, still very much a village in character. The new Underground station was built on the north edge of the village in open fields and, as intended, the new line stimulated rapid suburban expansion along its length. By the end of the decade, what had formerly been fields was quickly being covered with new housing.

The site of the station is very close to the location intended for the unbuilt Watford and Edgware Railway's (W&ER's) station, which was intended to be built on a branch from the existing single-track LNER branch before the terminus and run through to Watford Junction via Bushey.

=== New Works Programme ===
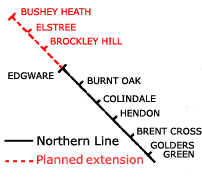
Planned Northern line extension to Bushey Heath

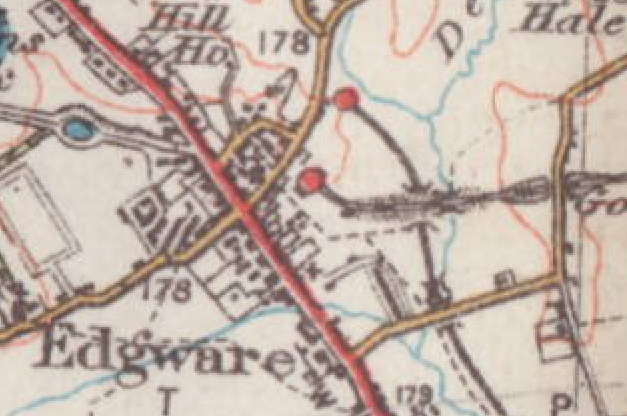
Map of Edgware from 1930 showing the Underground station (top) and LNER station (bottom) with its branch line heading east

In 1935 London Underground announced its New Works Programme. This had major implications for Edgware Underground station and the Morden-Edgware Line (as the Northern line was then known):

- A group of LNER lines in north London (the Northern Heights lines) including the branch from Finchley to Edgware would be taken over by London Underground and amalgamated with the Morden-Edgware Line.
- The existing Underground line would be extended north-west from Edgware by 5 kilometres to a new terminus at Bushey Heath and a depot at Aldenham. The extension to Bushey Heath involved three new stations (from south-east to north-west):
  - Brockley Hill
  - Elstree South
  - Bushey Heath

Much of the land for the railway's alignment had originally been bought by the W&ER in the 19th century, but it had not been able to raise the capital to fund the construction and its power's had expired in 1911. The Underground Group had bought the W&ER in 1922. The Underground's scheme modified the W&ER's plan to connect to the LNER branch by starting the extension from the Morden-Edgware Line station instead. The scheme involved the closure of the LNER station 200 metres south of the Underground station and retained the W&ER's connection to the LNER's single track line from where it passed over the Underground's tracks just to the east of the station and into new platforms to be built in the Underground station.

The new link at Edgware and others between LNER and Underground tracks near East Finchley station and at Finsbury Park would have made it theoretically possible to travel south from Edgware to central London via three routes:

- the existing Underground line to Golders Green, Camden Town and beyond
- the former LNER line to Finchley Central and Highgate, then the other branch of the Morden-Edgware Line to Camden Town and beyond
- the former LNER line to Finchley Central, Highgate and Finsbury Park then the Northern City Line to Moorgate

=== Postponement and cancellation ===
How Edgware might have appeared on the London Underground Map today if the Northern line extension to Bushey Heath and Mill Hill East had been constructed

Works to upgrade the existing LNER lines and construction on the new line to Bushey Heath began in the late 1930s but were halted by the outbreak of the Second World War. Additional platforms were started at Edgware and the LNER station and branch line was closed to passenger traffic in 1939 in preparation for the improvements. On the new extension, some earthworks and tunnelling had been undertaken and some structures had been constructed but no further work was done during the war.

The Metropolitan Green Belt was introduced to limit the outward expansion of London into the surrounding countryside. The area through which the new Bushey Heath extension was routed was designated as green belt meaning that the planned residential developments were prevented and the need for the stations serving them was removed.

Edgware LNER station was never reopened for passengers although freight traffic used the line until the 1960s. The improvements on the branch to Finchley were completed only between Mill Hill East and Finchley Central and only that short section was incorporated into the Northern line (as it had been renamed in the late 1930s). The completion of the plans were formally cancelled in 1950.

=== Accident ===
On 27 July 1946, an accident occurred at Edgware when the driver of a northbound train suffered a heart attack while entering the station. The train did not stop within the area of the platform, and struck the buffers at approximately 5 mph (8.0 km/h). No passengers were seriously injured, but Lofting died as a result of his heart failure before he could be removed from the wreckage. It appeared from the condition of the controls that Lofting had disabled the deadman's handle while the train was still moving. The circumstances of this accident were similar to those of the Moorgate tube crash of 1975.

=== Modernisation ===
During 2008–09, Tube Lines carried out work to modernise the station, including the fitting of lifts to enable step-free platform access, improved CCTV coverage and more help points.

== Connections ==
London Buses routes 32, 79, 107, 113, 142, 186, 204, 221, 240, 251, 288, 292, 303, 340, 384 and night routes N5, N16 and N113 and non-London bus routes 614 and 644 serve the station and bus station.

== See also ==
- Edgware, Highgate and London Railway for a history of the Northern Heights lines.

| Preceding station | London Underground | Following station |
|---|---|---|
| Terminus | Northern line Edgware branch | Burnt Oak towards Battersea Power Station, Morden or Kennington |
Abandoned Northern Heights Extension
| Brockley Hill towards Bushey Heath | Northern line | Mill Hill (The Hale) towards Morden or Kennington |
