= North End tube station =

Unopened London Underground station

Coordinates: 51.56900°N 0.18223°W

North End
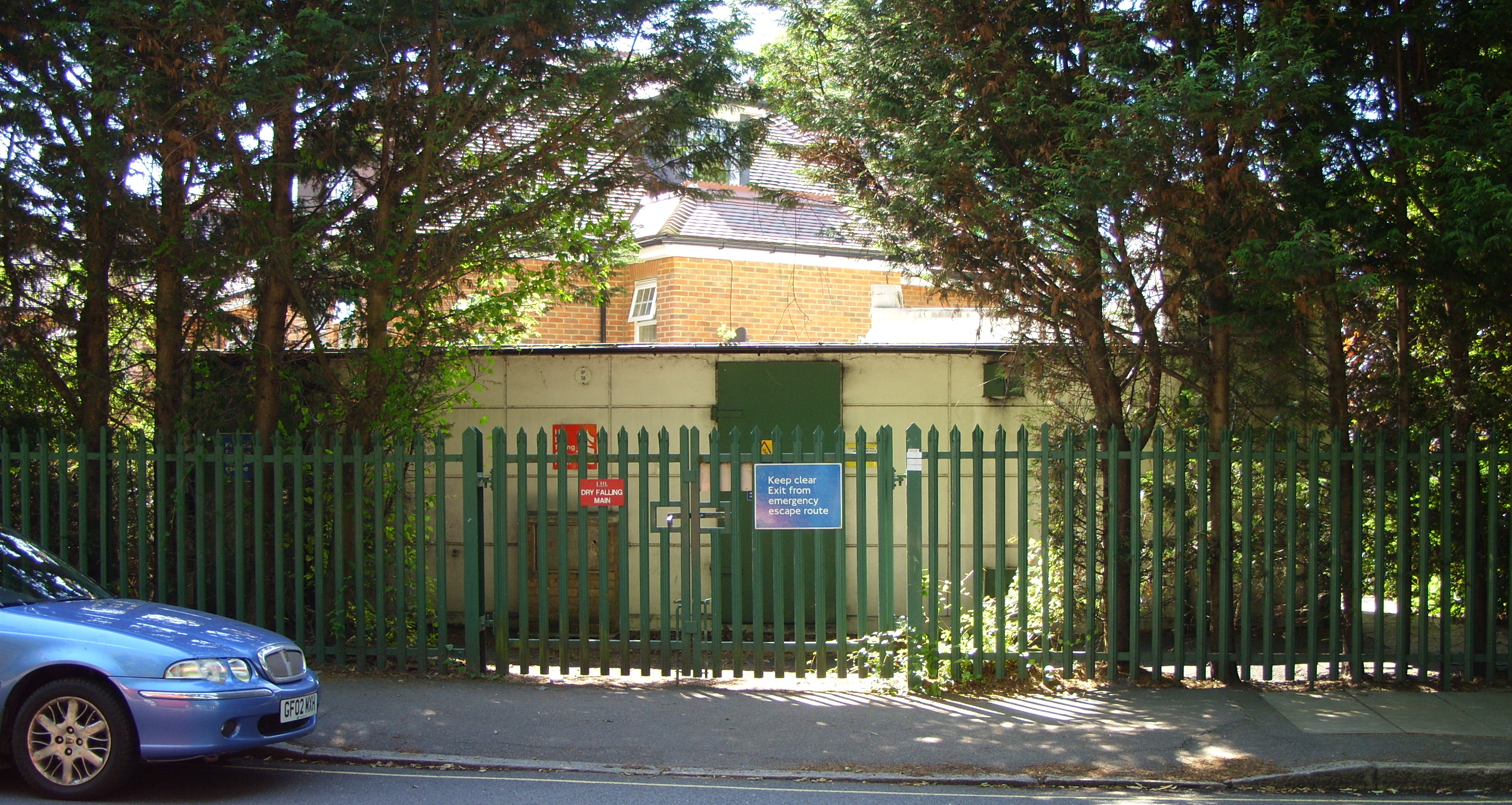
- London Underground's current building on the site of the never-completed station, providing access to the staircases and platform level
- Interactive map of North End

General information
- Location: North End
- Local authority: Barnet
- Owner: Never opened
- Number of platforms: 2 (unfinished)

Railway companies
- Original company: Charing Cross, Euston & Hampstead Railway

Other information

North End (commonly referred to as Bull and Bush) is a never-completed underground station, on the Charing Cross, Euston and Hampstead Railway (CCE&HR, now part of the London Underground's Northern line). The station was to have been built at North End on the boundaries of Hampstead Heath and Golders Hill Park and is located on the Edgware branch between Hampstead and Golders Green.

Due to its location near the top of a hill, the station would have been, at 221 feet (67 m), the deepest below ground on the entire Underground network. The current deepest is the adjacent Hampstead station to the southeast.

The station's alternative name derives from its proximity to the nearby famous Bull and Bush public house, a well-known landmark in the area.

The Grade II listed Hampstead War Memorial was erected in 1922 in the location where the station building was intended to stand.

== Construction ==
The original royal assent for the construction of the CCE&HR was granted under the Charing Cross, Euston and Hampstead Railway Act 1893 (56 & 57 Vict. c. ccxiv) but gave permission for a railway only as far north as Hampstead. Financing difficulties meant that no work had begun by the beginning of the 20th century and the company was bought out in 1900 by a syndicate led by American financier Charles Yerkes. Following the purchase, plans were revised to continue the route under the Heath to Golders Green where a depot could be constructed and where open farmland offered opportunities for property development.

The new proposals met with strong opposition from residents of Hampstead and users of the heath who feared that the construction of tunnels would detrimentally affect the Heath's ecology. The Metropolitan Borough of Hampstead also initially objected but relented and parliamentary approval was granted for the extended route in the Charing Cross, Euston and Hampstead Railway Act 1903 (3 Edw. 7. c. ci).

One of the conditions for construction of the extended route was the provision of an intermediate station at North End, which would have been located on Hampstead Way. The station would have served a new residential development being planned to the north of the heath, but Henrietta Barnett instigated the purchase of the land from Eton College in 1904 to form the Hampstead Heath Extension instead.

Tunnelling for the CCE&HR had begun in 1903 and the construction of the station continued to the extent that the larger diameter station tunnels and low-level passageways were excavated. However, it became apparent that the cancellation of the proposed residential development would significantly reduce the number of passengers using the station.

Works on the station were ended in 1906 before the lift shafts were dug and before any work on a surface building was done.

== Bunker ==
The approach road to the station was built and now forms the first part of Hampstead Way. Services began on the CCE&HR on 22 June 1907, running through the abandoned station. The uncompleted platforms and lower passageways remain, with access to the tracks. During World War II these were used to store secret archives, with access only available from the cabs of passing service trains.

During the Cold War a shaft with stairs, but no lift, was dug down to the lower passageways and the abandoned station became part of the London Underground's civil defence preparations. As the tunnels were the deepest in the network it was an ideal site. The role of this control centre was to manage the emergency floodgates placed throughout the tube network at the start of World War II, and previously controlled from central London. Its existence was kept secret and the newly-constructed entrance building at the top of the shaft was disguised as an electricity substation through the use of appropriate signage.

The exits from the platform tunnels are now marked as emergency evacuation routes from the Underground system, and its function is now publicly acknowledged.

Abandoned works
Preceding station	London Underground	Following station
Golders Green Terminus	Northern line	Hampstead towards Charing Cross
