= List of English Heritage blue plaques in the London Borough of Camden =

This is a list of the 183 English Heritage blue plaques in the London Borough of Camden.

Person	Inscription	Address	Year issued	Photo	Notes
Agnes Arber née Robertson (1879–1960)	"Botanist lived here 1890–1909"	9 Elsworthy Terrace, Primrose Hill NW3 3DR	2018		
Joanna Baillie (1762–1851)	"Poet and dramatist. Lived in this house for nearly 50 years"	"Bolton House", Windmill Hill; Hampstead NW3 6SJ	1900		
Irene Barclay (1894–1989)	"Housing reformer and Britain’s first qualified woman surveyor worked here 1964–1972"	1A St Martin's House, Polygon Road, Somers Town, NW1 1QB	2024		
Dame Henrietta Barnett (1851–1936) and Samuel Barnett (1844–1913)	"Dame Henrietta Barnett 1851–1936 Founder of Hampstead Garden Suburb and Samuel Barnett 1844–1915 Social Reformer lived here"	Heath End House, Spaniards Road; Hampstead NW3 7JE	1983		
Vanessa Bell (1879–1961); Duncan Grant (1885–1978)	"Artists lived and worked here"	46 Gordon Square; Bloomsbury WC1H 0PD	2023		There is also a plaque to John Maynard Keynes at this address.
Andrés Bello (1781–1865)	"Poet, Jurist, Philologist and Venezuelan Patriot lived here in 1810"	58 Grafton Way; Fitzrovia W1T 5DL	1996		
John Desmond Bernal (1901–1971)	"Crystallographer lived and died here"	44 Albert Street; Camden NW1 7NU	2001		
Sir Walter Besant (1836–1901)	"Novelist and Antiquary Lived and died here"	18 Frognal Gardens; Hampstead NW3 6XA	1925		
Sir John Betjeman (1906–1984)	"Poet lived here 1908–1917"	31 Highgate West Hill; Highgate N6 6NP	2006		
Robert Polhill Bevan (1865–1925)	"Camden Town Group Painter lived here 1900–1925"	14 Adamson Road; Belsize Park NW3 3HR	1999		
Arthur Bliss (1891–1975)	"Composer lived here 1929–1939"	East Heath Lodge, 1 East Heath Road; Hampstead NW3 1BN	1993		
David Bomberg (1890–1957)	"Painter lived and worked here 1928–1934"	10 Fordwych Road; West Hampstead NW2 3TP	1996		
Sir Adrian Boult C. H. (1889–1983)	"Conductor lived at flat No.78 1966–1977"	78 Marlborough Mansions, Cannon Hill; West Hampstead NW6 1JT	1998		
Henry Noel Brailsford (1873–1958)	"Writer. Champion of equal and free humanity, lived here"	37 Belsize Park Gardens, Belsize Park NW3 4JH	1983		
Dennis Brain (1921–1957)	"Horn-player lived here"	37 Frognal; Hampstead, NW3 6YD	1995		
Vera Brittain (1893–1970) and Winifred Holtby (1898–1935)	"Writers and reformers lived here"	58 Doughty Street; Holborn WC1N 2LS	1995		
Ford Madox Brown (1821–1893)	"Painter lived here"	56 Fortess Road; Kentish Town NW5 2HG	1976		
Sir Edward Burne-Jones (1833–1898) and William Morris (1834–1896) and Dante Gabriel Rossetti (1828–1882)	"In this house lived in 1851 Dante Gabriel Rossetti Poet and Painter and from 1856 to 1859 William Morris Poet and Artist and Sir Edward C. Burne-Jones Painter"	17 Red Lion Square; Holborn WC1R 4QH	1911		
Richard Burton (1925–1984)	"Actor lived here 1949–1956"	6 Lyndhurst Road; Hampstead NW3 5PX	2011		
Frances Mary Buss (1827–1894)	"Pioneer of Education for Women was Headmistress here 1879–1894"	Camden School for Girls, Sandall Road; Kentish Town NW5 2DB	2000		
Dame Clara Butt (1872–1937)	"Singer lived here 1901–1929"	7 Harley Road; Swiss Cottage NW3 3BX	1969		
William Butterfield (1814–1900)	"Architect lived here"	42 Bedford Square; Bloomsbury WC1B 3HX	1978		
Randolph Caldecott (1846–1886)	"Artist and Book Illustrator lived here"	46 Great Russell Street; Bloomsbury WC1B 3PA	1977		
Thomas Carlyle (1795–1881)	"Lived here"	33 Ampton Street; King's Cross WC1X 0LT	1907		
Henry Cavendish (1731–1810)	"Honourable Henry Cavendish natural philosopher lived here"	11 Bedford Square; Bloomsbury WC1B 3RF	1903		Erected by The Bedford Estate at the suggestion of the London County Council and incorporated into the official London-wide plaque scheme in 1983.
Robert Gascoyne-Cecil, 3rd Marquess of Salisbury (1830–1903)	"Prime Minister lived here"	21 Fitzroy Square; Fitzrovia W1T 6EL	1965		
Sir Arthur Hugh Clough (1819–1861)	"Poet lived here 1854–1859"	11 St Mark's Crescent; Primrose Hill NW1 7TS	2009		
C. R. Cockerell (1788–1863)	"Architect and Antiquary lived and died here"	13 Chester Terrace; Regent's Park NW1 4ND	1989		
John Constable (1776–1837)	"Painter lived here"	40 Well Walk; Hampstead NW3 1BX	1923		
Jill Craigie (1911–1999)	"Film-maker and Writer lived here 1965–1999"	66 Pilgrim’s Lane; Hampstead, NW3 1SN	2026		
George Cruikshank (1792–1878)	"Artist. Lived here from 1850 to 1878"	293 Hampstead Road; Camden Town, NW1 3EA	1885		
Richard D'Oyly Carte (1844–1901)	"Opera Impresario and Hotelier lived here 1860–1870"	2 Dartmouth Park Road; Kentish Town NW5 1SY	2010		
Sir Henry Dale (1875–1968)	"Physiologist lived here"	Mount Vernon House, Mount Vernon; Hampstead NW3 6QR	1981		
George Dance the Younger (1741–1825)	"Architect lived and died here"	91 Gower Street; Bloomsbury WC1E 6AA	1970		
William Daniell (1769–1837)	"Artist and engraver of Indian scenes lived and died here"	135 Saint Pancras Way; Camden NW1 0SY	2000		
Charles Darwin (1809–1882)	"Naturalist Lived in a house on this site 1838–1842"	Biological Sciences Building, University College London, Gower Street; Bloomsbury WC1E 6BT	1961		
Francisco De Miranda (1750–1816)	"Precursor of Latin American Independence lived here 1802–1810"	58 Grafton Way; Fitzrovia W1T 5DL	1996		
Frederick Delius (1868–1941)	"Composer lived here 1918–1919"	44 Belsize Park Gardens; Belsize Park NW3 4LY	1999		
David Devant (1868–1941)	"Magician lived here in flat No.1"	Flat 1 Ornan Court, Ornan Road; Belsize Park NW3 4PT	2003		
Charles Dickens (1812–1870)	"Novelist lived here"	48 Doughty Street (now the Charles Dickens Museum); Holborn WC1N 2LX	1903		
Benjamin Disraeli, Earl of Beaconsfield (1804–1881)	"Earl of Beaconsfield Born Here 1804"	22 Theobalds Road; Holborn WC1X 8NX	1903		
George du Maurier (1834–1896)	"Artist and writer lived here 1863–1868"	91 Great Russell Street; Bloomsbury WC1B 3PS	1960		
George du Maurier (1834–1896)	"Lived here 1874–1895"	New Grove House, 28 Hampstead Grove; Hampstead NW3 6SP	1900		Erected by private subscribers 1900, adopted by London County Council in 1959
Sir Gerald du Maurier (1873–1934)	"Actor-Manager lived here from 1916 until his death"	Cannon Hall, 14 Cannon Place; Hampstead NW3 1EH	1967		
Thomas Earnshaw (1749–1829)	"Site of the business premises of Thomas Earnshaw 1749–1829 noted watch and chronometer maker"	119 High Holborn; Holborn WC1V 6RD	1948		
Sir Charles Eastlake (1793–1865)	"Painter and First Director of the National Gallery lived here"	7 Fitzroy Square; Fitzrovia W1T 5HL	1985		
John Passmore Edwards (1823–1911)	"Journalist, editor and builder of free public libraries lived here"	51 Netherhall Gardens; Hampstead NW3 5RJ	1988		
Lord Eldon (1751–1838)	"Lord Chancellor lived here"	6 Bedford Square; Bloomsbury WC1B 3RA	1954		
Frederich Engels (1820–1895)	"Political Philosopher lived here 1870–1894"	122 Regent's Park Road; Primrose Hill NW1 8XL	1972		
Fabian Society	"The site of 17 Osnaburgh Street where the Fabian Society was founded in 1884"	The White House, Osnaburgh Street; Regent's Park NW1 3UP	1985		
Millicent Garrett Fawcett (1847–1929)	"Pioneer of women's suffrage lived and died here"	2 Gower Street; Bloomsbury WC1E 6DP	1954		
Roger Fenton (1819–1869)	"Photographer lived here"	2 Albert Terrace; Primrose Hill NW1 7SU	1991		
Kathleen Ferrier (1912–1953)	"Contralto lived here"	97 Frognal; Hampstead NW3 6XT	1979		
Ruth First (1925–1982) and Joe Slovo (1926–1995)	"South African Freedom Fighters lived here 1966–1978"	13 Lyme Street; Camden Town NW1 0EH	2003		
Sir Ronald Aylmer Fisher (1890–1962)	"Statistician and Geneticist lived here 1896–1904"	Inverforth House, North End Way; Hampstead NW3 7EU	2002		
Captain Matthew Flinders R. N. (1774–1814)	"Explorer and navigator lived here"	56 Fitzroy Street; Fitzrovia W1T 5BU	1961		
Theodor Fontane (1819–1898)	"German Writer and Novelist lived here 1857–1858"	6 St Augustine's Road; Camden Town NW1 9RN	1974		
Anna Freud (1895–1982)	"Pioneer of Child Psychoanalysis lived here 1938–1982"	20 Maresfield Gardens (now the Freud Museum); Hampstead NW3 5SX	2002		
Sigmund Freud (1819–1898)	"Founder of Psychoanalysis lived here 1938–1939"	20 Maresfield Gardens (now the Freud Museum); Hampstead NW3 5SX	2002		
Roger Fry (1866–1934)	"In this house Roger Fry 1866–1934 Artist and Art Critic ran the Omega Workshops 1913–1919"	33 Fitzroy Square; Fitzrovia W1P 6AY	2010		
Hugh Gaitskell (1906–1963)	"Statesman lived here"	18 Frognal Gardens; Hampstead NW3 6XA	1986		
John Galsworthy (1867–1933)	"Novelist and playwright lived here 1918–1933"	Grove Lodge, Admiral's Walk; Hampstead NW3 6RS	1950		
Rhoda Garrett (1841–1882); Agnes Garrett (1812–1935)	"Interior decorators and suffragists lived, worked and died here"	2 Gower Street; Bloomsbury WC1E 6DP	2025		There is also a plaque to Agnes Garret's younger sister Millicent Fawcett at this address, erected by London County Council in 1954.
Sir Harold Gillies (1882–1960)	"Pioneer Plastic Surgeon lived here"	71 Frognal; Hampstead NW3 6XY	1997		
E H Gombrich (1909–2001)	"Art historian lived here"	19 Briardale Gardens; Hampstead NW3 7PN	2015		
Spencer Frederick Gore (1878–1914)	"Painter lived and worked here 1909–1912"	31 Mornington Crescent; Camden NW1 7RE	2017		
Kate Greenaway (1846–1901)	"Artist lived & died here"	39 Frognal; Hampstead NW3 6YD	1949		
Sir Nigel Gresley (1876–1941)	"Locomotive Engineer had his office in this station 1923–1941"	Platform 8, King's Cross station King's Cross N1 9AG	1997		
Walter Gropius (1883–1969); Marcel Breuer (1902–1981); László Moholy-Nagy (1895–1946)	"Pioneers of modern design at the Bauhaus lived here"	Lawn Road Flats, Hampstead, London NW3 2XD	2018		
Dame Helen Gwynne-Vaughan (1879–1967)	"Botanist and a leader of the first women’s army corps lived in flat 93 1915–1964"	Flat 93, Bedford Court Mansions, Fitzrovia, London WC1B 3AE	2020		
Barbara Hammond (1873–1961) and J. L. Hammond (1872–1949)	"Social Historians lived here 1906–1913"	'Hollycot', Vale of Health; Hampstead NW3 1BB	1972		
Alfred Harmsworth, 1st Viscount Northcliffe (1865–1922)	"Journalist and Newspaper Proprietor lived here"	31 Pandora Road; West Hampstead NW6 1TS	1979		
John Harrison (1693–1776)	"Inventor of the marine chronometer lived and died in a house on this site"	Summit House, Red Lion Square; Bloomsbury WC1R 4QD	1954		
Sir Anthony Hope Hawkins (Anthony Hope) (1863–1933)	"Novelist lived here 1903–1917"	41 Bedford Square; Bloomsbury, WC1B 3HX	1976		
John Heartfield (1891–1968)	"Master of Political Photomontage lived here 1938–1943"	47 Downshire Hill; Hampstead NW3 1NX	2004		
Oliver Heaviside (1850–1925)	"Theorist of Telecommunications lived here"	123 Camden Street; Camden NW1 0HX	2022		
Jim Henson (1936–1990)	"Creator of The Muppets lived here"	50 Downshire Hill; Hampstead NW3 1PA	2021		
Robert Travers Herford (1860–1950)	"Unitarian Minister Scholar and Interpreter of Judaism lived and worked here"	Dr Williams's Library, 14 Gordon Square; Bloomsbury WC1H 0AG	1990		
Sir Rowland Hill, K. C. B. (1795–1859)	"Originator of the Penny Post lived here"	Royal Free Hospital, Pond Street; Hampstead NW3 2QG	1893		
Thomas Hodgkin (1798–1886)	"Physician, Reformer and Philanthropist lived here"	35 Bedford Square; Bloomsbury WC1B 3ES	1985		
August Wilhelm Hofmann (1818–1892)	"Professor of Chemistry lived here"	9 Fitzroy Square; Fitzrovia W1T 5HW	1985		
John Howard (1726–1790)	"Prison Reformer Lived Here"	23 Great Ormond Street; Holborn WC1N 3JB	1908		
Hugh Price Hughes (1847–1902)	"Methodist Preacher lived and died here"	8 Taviton Street; Bloomsbury WC1H 0BX	1989		
Leslie 'Hutch' Hutchinson (1900–1969)	"Singer and Pianist lived here 1929–1967"	31 Steele's Road; Chalk Farm NW3 4RE	2012		
Huxley family Aldous Huxley (1894–1963); Julian Huxley (1887–1975); Leonard Huxley (1860–1933)	"Men of Science and Letters lived here"	16 Bracknell Gardens; Hampstead NW3 7EB	1995		
Henry Mayers Hyndman (1842–1921)	"Socialist Leader lived and died here"	13 Well Walk; Hampstead NW3 1BY	1972		
W. W. Jacobs (1863–1943)	"Author lived here"	15 Gloucester Gate (Albany Street frontage); Regent's Park NW1 4HG	1998		
Geoffrey Jellicoe (1900–1996)	"Landscape Architect lived here 1936–1984"	19 Grove Terrace; Dartmouth Park NW5 IPH	2009		
Humphrey Jennings (1907–1950)	"Documentary Film Maker lived here 1944–1950"	8 Regent's Park Terrace; Camden Town NW1 7EE	2006		
Tamara Karsavina (1885–1978)	"Ballerina lived here"	108 Frognal; Hampstead NW3 6XU	1987		
John Keats (1795–1821)	"Poet, lived in this house"	Keats House (formerly Wentworth Place), Keats Grove; Hampstead NW3 2RR	1896		
John Maynard Keynes (1883–1946)	"Economist lived here 1916–1946"	46 Gordon Square; Bloomsbury WC1H 0PD	1975		This was joined by a plaque commemorating Vanessa Bell and Duncan Grant in November 2023.
Noor Inayat Khan (1914–1944)	"SOE Agent codename ‘Madeleine’ stayed here"	4 Taviton Street; Bloomsbury WC1H 0BT	2020		
Sir Syed Ahmed Khan (1817–1898)	"Muslim Reformer and Scholar lived here 1869–1870"	21 Mecklenburgh Square; Bloomsbury WC1N 2DT	1997		
Constant Lambert (1905–1951)	"Composer lived here 1947–1951"	197 Albany Street; Regent's Park NW1 4AB	1997		
Charles Laughton (1899–1962)	"Actor lived here 1928–1931"	15 Percy Street; Fitzrovia W1T 1DU	1992		
D. H. Lawrence (1885–1930)	"Novelist and Poet lived here in 1915"	1 Byron Villas, Vale of Health; Hampstead NW3 1AR	1969		
William Richard Lethaby (1857–1931)	"Architect and first principal of this School in 1896–1911"	Central School of Arts and Crafts, Southampton Row; Holborn WC1B 4AP	1957		
William Richard Lethaby (1857–1931)	"Architect lived here 1880–1891"	20 Calthorpe Street; Clerkenwell WC1X 0JS	1979		
William Lever, 1st Viscount Leverhulme (1851–1925)	"Soap-maker and Philanthropist lived and died here"	Inverforth House, North End Way; Hampstead NW3 7EU	2002		
Lilian Lindsay (1871–1960)	"The First Woman Dentist to Qualify in Britain lived here"	23 Russell Square; Bloomsbury WC1H 0X	2019		Plaque was originally erected at 3 Hungerford Road, Holloway, N7 9LA in Islington in 2013, but was moved to present address in 2019 due to the demolition of the Hungerford Road site.
Joseph Lister (1827–1912)	"Pioneer of antiseptic surgery lived here as a student"	52 Maple Street; Fitzrovia WC1H 0XG	2024		Indirectly replaced a plaque at 12 Park Crescent lost in 2018
George Macdonald (1824–1905)	"Story Teller lived here 1860–1863"	20 Albert Street; Camden Town NW1 7LU	2005		
Ramsay MacDonald (1836–1937)	"Prime Minister lived here 1916–1925"	9 Howitt Road; Belsize Park NW3 4LT	1963		
Dame Ida Mann (1893–1983)	"Ophthalmologist lived here 1902–1934"	13 Minster Road; West Hampstead NW2 3SE	2012		
Katherine Mansfield (1888–1923) and John Middleton Murry (1889–1957)	Katherine Mansfield 1888–1923 writer, and her husband John Middleton Murry 1889–1957 critic lived here	17 East Heath Road; Hampstead NW3 1AL	1969		
William Marsden (1796–1867)	"Surgeon Founder of the Royal Free and Royal Marsden Hospitals lived here"	65 Lincoln's Inn Fields; Holborn WC2A 4LH	1986		
Una Marson (1905–1965)	"Jamaican-born broadcaster, writer and equalities campaigner lived here"	The Mansions, 33 Mill Lane, West Hampstead NW6 1NY	2025		
Tobias Matthay (1858–1945)	"Teacher and Pianist lived here"	21 Arkwright Road; Hampstead NW3 6AA	1979		
Sir Hiram Maxim (1840–1916)	"Inventor and engineer designed and manufactured The Maxim Gun in a workshop on these premises"	57d Hatton Garden; Holborn EC1N 8HP	1966		
Henry Mayhew (1812–1887)	"Founder of Punch and author of London Labour and the London Poor lived here"	55 Albany Street; Regent's Park NW1 4BT	1953		
Giuseppe Mazzini (1805–1872)	"Italian patriot lived here"	183 Gower Street; Bloomsbury NW1 2NJ	1950		
Peter Medawar (1915–1987)	"Pioneer of Transplantation Immunology lived here"	25 Downshire Hill; Hampstead NW3 1NT	2014		
Lee Miller (1907–1977) and Sir Roland Penrose (1900–1984)	"Lee Miller 1907–1977 Photographer and Sir Roland Penrose 1900–1984 Surrealist lived here"	21 Downshire Hill; Hampstead NW3 1NT	2003		
Piet Cornelis Mondrian (1872–1944)	"Painter lived here"	60 Parkhill Road; Hampstead NW3 2YT	1975		
Henry Moore (1898–1986)	"Sculptor lived and worked here 1929–1940"	11a Parkhill Road; Hampstead NW3 2YH	2004		
Lady Ottoline Morrell (1873–1938)	"Literary Hostess and Patron of the Arts lived here"	10 Gower Street; Bloomsbury WC1E 6DP	1986		
John McCormack (1884–1945)	"Lyric Tenor lived here 1908–1913"	24 Ferncroft Avenue; Hampstead NW3 7PH	2005		
John Nash (1752–1835)	"Architect Designed this terrace and lived here"	66 Great Russell Street; Bloomsbury WC1B 3BN	2013		
Paul Nash (1889–1923)	"Artist lived in Flat 176 1914–1936"	Queen Alexandra Mansions, Bidborough Street; King's Cross WC1H 9DJ	1991		
Henry Nevinson (1856–1941); C.R.W. Nevinson (1856–1941)	"Journalist" "Artist lived and worked here"	4 Downside Crescent, Hampstead, London; NW3 2AP	2018		
Ben Nicholson O. M. (1894–1982)	"Artist lived and died here"	2B Pilgrim's Lane; Hampstead NW3 1SL	2002		
Sir William Nicholson (1872–1949)	"Painter and Printmaker lived here 1904–1906"	1 Pilgrim's Lane; Hampstead NW3 1SJ	2010		
Kwame Nkrumah (1909–1972)	"First President of Ghana lived here 1945–47"	60 Burghley Road; Kentish Town NW5 1UN	2005		
Helena Normanton (1882–1957)	"Barrister and advocate for women's rights lived here 1919–1929"	22 Mecklenburgh Square; Bloomsbury WC1N 2AD	2021		
George Orwell (1903–1950)	"Novelist and Political Essayist lived here"	50 Lawford Road; Kentish Town NW5 2LN	1980		
Martina Bergman-Österberg (1849–1915)	"Pioneer of Physical Education for Women lived and worked here"	1 Broadhurst Gardens; Hampstead NW6 3QX	1999		
Coventry Patmore (1823–1896)	"Poet and Essayist lived here 1863–1864"	14 Percy Street; Fitzrovia W1T 1DR	1960		
Karl Pearson (1857–1936)	"Pioneer Statistician lived here"	7 Well Road; Hampstead NW3 1LH	1983		
Spencer Perceval (1762–1812)	"Prime Minister lived here"	59–60 Lincoln's Inn Fields; Holborn WC2A 3LJ	1914		
Sir Flinders Petrie (1853–1942)	"Egyptologist lived here"	5 Cannon Place; Hampstead NW3 1EH	1954		
Sir Nikolaus Pevsner (1902–1983)	"Architectural Historian lived here from 1936 until his death"	2, Wildwood Terrace; Hampstead NW3 7HT	2007		
Sylvia Plath (1932–1963)	"Poet lived here 1960–1961"	3 Chalcot Square; Primrose Hill NW1 8YB	2000		
Pre-Raphaelite Brotherhood	"In this house the Pre-Raphaelite Brotherhood was founded in 1848"	7 Gower Street; Bloomsbury WC1E 6HA	1998		
J. B. Priestley (1894–1984)	"Novelist, playwright and essayist lived here"	3, The Grove; Highgate N6 6JU	1994		A local council bronze plaque to Samuel Taylor Coleridge is on the same building.
Arthur Rackham (1867–1939)	"Illustrator lived here"	16 Chalcot Gardens; Belsize Park NW3 4YB	1981		
Sir Harry Ricardo (1885–1974)	"Mechanical Engineer was born here"	13 Bedford Square; Bloomsbury WC1B 3RA	2005		
Dr. José Rizal (1861–1896)	"Writer and National Hero of the Philippines"	37 Chalcot Crescent; Primrose Hill NW1 8YG	1983		
William Roberts (1895–1980)	"Artist lived, worked and died here 1946–1980"	14 St Mark's Crescent; Primrose Hill NW1 7TS	2003		
Paul Robeson (1898–1976)	"Singer and Actor lived here 1929–1930"	The Chestnuts, Branch Hill; Hampstead NW3 7NA	2002		
James Robinson (1813–1862)	"Pioneer of Anaesthesia and Dentistry lived and worked here"	14 Gower Street; Bloomsbury WC1E 6DP	1991		
Sir Samuel Romilly (1757–1818)	"Here Lived Sir Samuel Romilly Law Reformer"	21 Russell Square; Bloomsbury WC1B 4EH	1919		Erected by The Bedford Estate
George Romney (1734–1802)	"Painter lived here"	Romney's House, 5 Holly Bush Hill; Hampstead NW3 6SH	1908		
Christina Georgina Rossetti (1830–1894)	"Here lived and died Christina Georgina Rossetti Poetess Born 1830:Died 1894"	30 Torrington Square; Bloomsbury WC1E 7JL	c.1913		Erected by The Bedford Estate c1913. Adopted by Greater London Council 1974.
Ram Mohan Roy (1772–1833)	"Indian Scholar and Reformer lived here"	49 Bedford Square; Bloomsbury WC1B 3DP	1985		
Bertrand Russell (1872–1970)	"Philosopher and Campaigner for Peace lived here in flat No.34 1911–1916"	34 Russell Chambers, Bury Place; Bloomsbury WC1A 2JX	2002		
Sir John Maitland Salmond (1881–1968)	"Marshal of the Royal Air Force Sir John Maitland Salmond 1881–1968 RAF Commander lived here 1928–1936"	27 Chester Terrace; Regent's Park NW1 4ND	2002		
Dorothy L. Sayers (1893–1957)	"Writer of Detective Stories lived here 1921–1929"	24 Great James Street; Holborn WC1N 3ES	2000		
Tom Sayers (1826–1865)	"Pugilist lived here"	257 Camden High Street; Camden Town NW1 7BU	2002		
Sir George Gilbert Scott (1811–1878)	"Architect lived here"	Admiral's House, Admiral's Walk; Hampstead NW3 6RS	1910		
Cecil Sharp (1859–1924)	"Collector of English Folk Songs and dances lived here"	4 Maresfield Gardens; Hampstead NW3 5SU	1985		
Sir George Bernard Shaw (1856–1950)	"Lived in this house from 1887 to 1898 "From the coffers of his genius he enriched the world"	29 Fitzroy Square; Fitzrovia W1T 5LP	1951		
Richard Norman Shaw (1831–1912)	"Architect designed this house in which he lived worked and died"	6 Ellerdale Road; Hampstead NW3 6BD	2006		
Walter Sickert (1860–1942)	"Painter and etcher lived and worked here"	6 Mornington Crescent; Camden Town NW1 7RH	1977		
Augustus Siebe (1788–1872)	"Pioneer of the Diving Helmet lived and worked here"	5 Denmark Street; St Giles WC2H 8LS	2000		
Alastair Sim (1900–1976)	"Actor lived here 1953–1975"	8 Frognal Gardens; Hampstead NW3 6UX	2008		
Edith Sitwell (1887–1964)	"Poet lived here in Flat 42"	Greenhill, Hampstead High Street; Hampstead NW3 5TY	1998		
Sir Hans Sloane (1660–1653)	"Physician Benefactor of the British Museum lived here 1695–1742"	4 Bloomsbury Place; Bloomsbury WC1A 2QA	1965		
Sir Robert Smirke (1781–1867)	"Architect lived here"	81 Charlotte Street; Fitzrovia W1T 4PP	1979		
Sydney Smith (1771–1845)	"Author and Wit lived here"	14 Doughty Street; Holborn WC1N 2PL	1906		Plaque erected in 1905 proved faulty and was replaced in 1906.
Alfred Stevens (1818–1875)	"Artist lived here"	9 Eton Villas; Belsize Park NW3 5SX	1924		
Lytton Strachey (1880–1932)	"Critic and Biographer lived here"	51 Gordon Square; Bloomsbury WC1H 0PN	1971		
Sir John Summerson (1904–1992)	"Architectural historian lived here from 1949 until his death"	1 Eton Villas; Chalk Farm NW1 4SX	2012		
Rabindranath Tagore (1861–1941)	"Indian poet stayed here in 1912"	3 Villas on the Heath, Vale of Health; Hampstead NW3 1BA	1961		
R. H. Tawney (1880–1962)	"Historian, Teacher and Political Writer lived here"	21 Mecklenburgh Square; Bloomsbury WC1N 2DT	1980		
A. J. P. Taylor (1906–1990)	"Historian and Broadcaster lived here"	13 St Mark's Crescent; Primrose Hill NW1 7TS	2013		
John Thelwall (1764–1834)	"Political Orator, Writer and Elocutionist lived and worked here 1806–1813"	40 Bedford Place, Bloomsbury WC1B 5JT	2018		
Dylan Thomas (1914–1953)	"Poet lived here"	54 Delancey Street; Camden Town NW1 7RY	1983		
Sir Harry Vane (1612–1662)	"STATESMAN LIVED HERE"	Vane House, Rosslyn Hill; Hampstead NW3 5UN	1897		
Michael Ventris (1922–1956)	"Architect and Decipherer of Linear B script lived here"	19 North End; Hampstead NW3 7HR	1990		
Baron Friedrich von Hügel (1852–1925)	"Theologian lived here 1882–1903"	4 Holford Road; Hampstead NW3 1AD	1968		
Thomas Wakley (1795–1862)	"Reformer and founder of The Lancet"	35 Bedford Square; Bloomsbury WC1B 3ES	1962		
Beatrice (1858–1943) and Sidney Webb (1859–1947)	"Social Scientists and Political Reformers lived here"	1 Netherhall Gardens; Hampstead NW3 5RS	1981		
Sir Henry Wellcome (1853–1936)	"Pharmacist Founder of the Wellcome Trust and Foundation lived here"	6 Gloucester Gate; Regent's Park NW1 4HG	1989		
Fanny Wilkinson (1855–1951)	"Landscape gardener and designer of many open spaces in London lived and worked here 1885–1896"	239–241 Shaftesbury Avenue; Bloomsbury WC1A 1BL	2022		
Dr. Robert Willan (1759–1812)	"Dermatologist lived here"	10 Bloomsbury Square; Bloomsbury WC1A 2LP	1949		
'Father' Henry Willis (1821–1901)	"Organ Builder lived here"	9 Rochester Terrace; Camden NW1 9JN	1986		
Sir Henry Wood (1869–1944)	"Musician lived here"	4 Elsworthy Road; Belsize Park NW3 3DJ	1969		
Virginia Woolf (1882–1941)	"Virginia Stephen (Virginia Woolf) 1882–1941 novelist and critic lived here 1907–1911"	29 Fitzroy Square; Fitzrovia W1T 5LP	1974		
Thomas Henry Wyatt (1807–1880)	"Architect lived and died here"	77 Great Russell Street; Bloomsbury WC1B 3DA	1957		
William Butler Yeats (1865–1939)	"Irish poet and dramatist lived here"	23 Fitzroy Road; Primrose Hill NW1 8TP	1957		
Wing Commander F. F. E. Yeo-Thomas G. C. (1902–1964)	"Secret Agent codename 'The White Rabbit' lived here"	Queen Court, 24–28 Queen Square, Guilford Street; Holborn WC1N 3BB	2010		
