= Inverforth House =

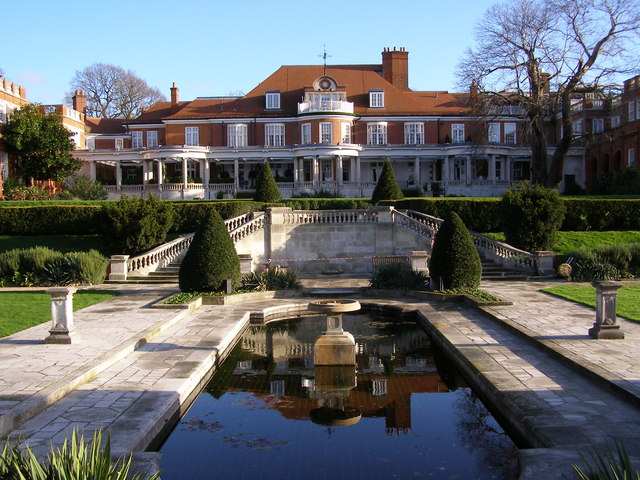

- Location within Greater London
- 51°33′53.4″N 0°10′51.44″W
- Location: North End Way, Hampstead, London, NW3

History
- Built: 1895

Site notes
- Architect(s): Grayson and Ould
- Architectural style: British Queen Anne Revival style
- Governing body: Privately owned

Listed Building – Grade II
- Official name: Inverforth House
- Designated: 7 September 1988
- Reference no.: 1113185

Inverforth House (formerly known as The Hill) is a large detached house on North End Way at North End on the outskirts of Hampstead in the London Borough of Camden, NW3. Owned by William Lever, 1st Viscount Leverhulme from 1904 to 1925, The Hill was bought by Andrew Weir, 1st Baron Inverforth after Leverhulme's death in 1925, and following was given to Manor House Hospital after Inverforth's death in 1956.

It became the women's section of Manor House Hospital, with about 100 beds and a Nurses' Home for 60-70 staff. Never part of the NHS, the Hospital was funded by the Industrial Orthopaedic Society, a trade union.

According to the developer, mistakenly, Inverforth House was home to the Orthopaedic Society Hospital from the 1950s to the 1980s, and was converted into two houses and seven apartments in the late 1990s.

Rebuilt in the British Queen Anne Revival style in 1895 by the architectural firm Grayson and Ould, it is a Grade II listed building. Built from red brick, Inverforth House has a steeply pitched roof. The architectural style of Inverforth House has been described as "Neo-Georgian" with "Queen Anne style wings".

In 2002 English Heritage commemorated Viscount Leverhulme and geneticist and statistician Ronald Fisher, who lived there as a child from 1896 to 1904, with blue plaques.

== Location ==
Inverforth House is situated on North End Way, between Hampstead and Golders Green. The house and gardens adjoin the West Heath, with Golders Hill Park to the north. Sandy Heath and Hampstead Heath are to the south. Inverforth House is close to Heath House, which at 440 ft above sea level, was the highest point in the County of London.

== History ==
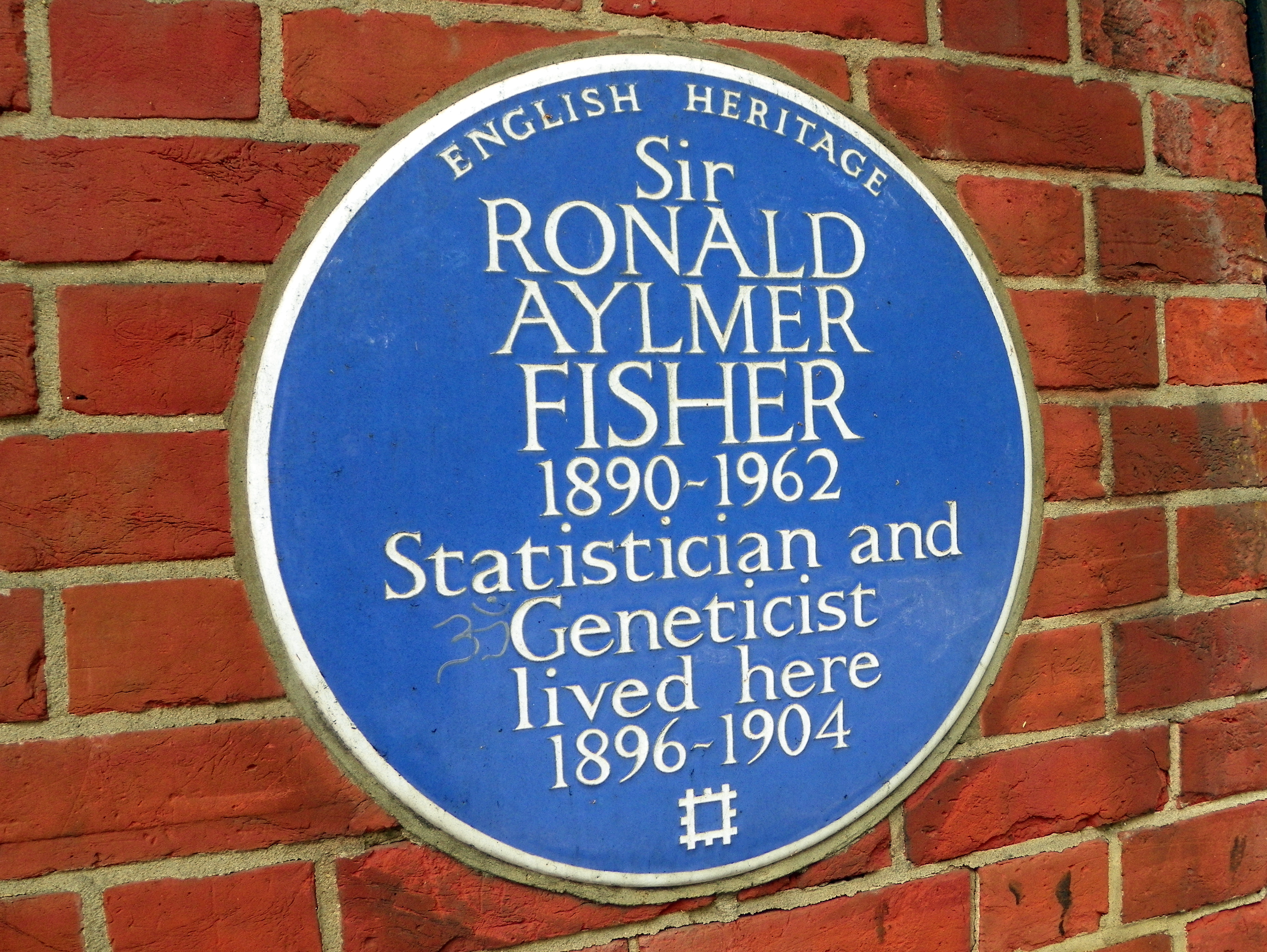
Fisher's Blue plaque

From 1896 to 1904, the house was lived in by the auctioneer and fine arts dealer George Fisher, a partner in Robinson & Fisher and his family of five children, including a young Ronald, the future geneticist and statistician Sir Ronald Fisher. Following his wife's death in 1904, George Fisher lost his fortune within 18 months, and the family moved south of the river to Streatham.

The original house on the site was built in 1807, and was rebuilt by the Liverpool architectural firm Grayson and Ould, who greatly altered the house from 1905, their significant alterations included the rebuilding of the central block and the addition of northern and southern wings to the garden front. Grayson and Ould also designed a terrace facing the garden, and a verandah was added to the terrace in 1910 by Thomas Hayton Mawson. A ballroom was added beneath the terrace in 1923 by Leslie Mansfield.

The south wing of the house was extended and remodelled between 1924 and 1925 by Mawson, with a library wing added to the front of the house from 1913 to 1914. The library was built by William and Segar Owen of Warrington, who had designed buildings in Leverhulme's Port Sunlight development.

The interiors of Inverforth House are richly decorated in styles including Jacobean to William and Mary, and a style reminiscent of William Adam. The entrance hall features a carved marble staircase. Inverforth's House interior style has been described by English Heritage as "A rich architectural amalgam reflecting the tastes of a notable patron".

=== Gardens ===
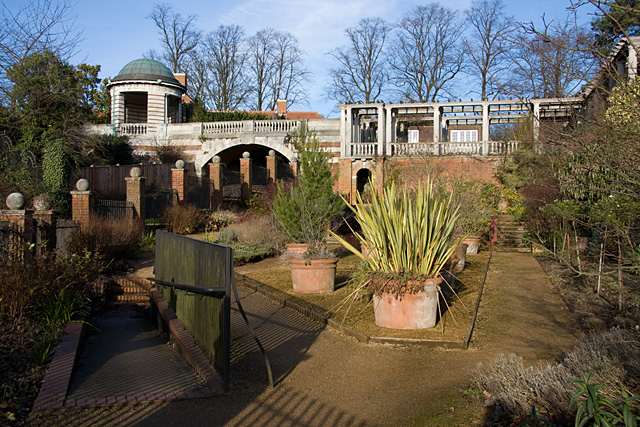
The Hill Garden

The notable gardens, also designed by Mawson were laid out from 1906. A northern garden was laid out in the 1920s by Leslie Mansfield. The greater part of the gardens are now owned by the City of London Corporation, and open to the public as The Hill Garden and Pergola. Several buildings within the garden are individually listed at grade II* or grade II. Those at grade II* include: the summerhouse at the western end of the pergola, which has extensive views over Hampstead Heath towards Harrow on the Hill; a summerhouse to the south of the garden; the southern pergola and terrace; the Cruciform pergola; a bridge; the Central Temple summerhouse; and the western pergola. The structures listed at grade II are: the pond and its architectural surround; and the garden terrace steps.
