= Hampstead Road =

Hampstead Road may refer to:

- Hampstead Road, Adelaide
- Hampstead Road, London
- Primrose Hill railway station, the disused railway station in London that opened with this name

== See also ==
- Hampstead Way, a London street
