= The Old Bull and Bush =

Pub in Hampstead, London

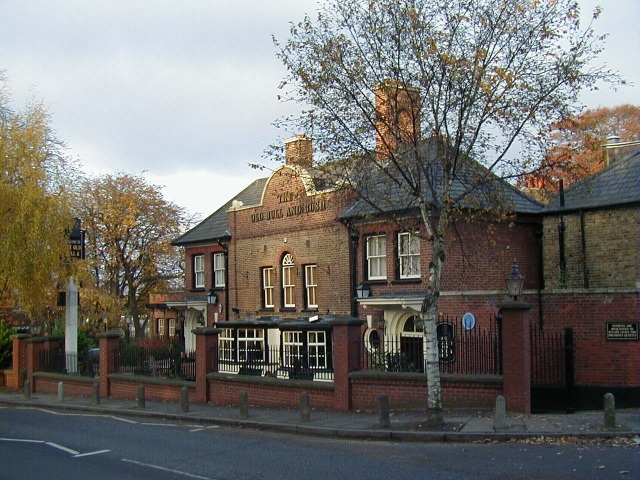
- The Old Bull and Bush pub
- Interactive map of The Old Bull and Bush

Restaurant information
- Food type: Gastropub
- Location: North End Way, London, NW3 7HE, United Kingdom
- Coordinates: 51°34′03″N 0°10′58″W
- Website: www.thebullandbush.co.uk

The Old Bull and Bush is a Grade II listed public house at North End near Hampstead Heath in London, which gave its name to the music hall song "Down at the Old Bull and Bush", sung by Florrie Forde. It is located on North End Way.

The Old Bull and Bush is managed by Mitchells and Butlers under the Premium Country Dining Group brand. The interior was renovated to a modern, gastropub style in 2006. Until the introduction of the smoking ban in England in 2007, The Bull and Bush was one of the few completely smoke-free pubs in London.

== History ==
The earliest record of a building on the site is of a farmhouse in 1645. The farmhouse gained a licence to sell ale in 1721. William Hogarth drank here and is believed to have been involved in planting out the pub garden.

The pub gained a music licence in 1867, when Henry Humphries was the landlord. The pub became popular as a day trip for cockneys.

The building underwent a major reconstruction in 1924, when it was owned by the Ind Coope brewery. Another refurbishment took place in 1987.

In 2006, the interior was renovated to a modern, gastropub style with an openly visible kitchen, and reopened to the public on 24 March that year.

== Bull and Bush tube station ==
Near the pub was the site of the proposed North End tube station (also called Bull and Bush) on the Northern line of the London Underground. Only the platforms were excavated, and the station construction was cancelled. An entrance (for emergency use only) leading down 197 steps to the platform level is located on Hampstead Way.
