= Metropolitan Borough of Hampstead =

Former local authority in London

Coordinates: 51.5510°N 0.1783°W

Hampstead
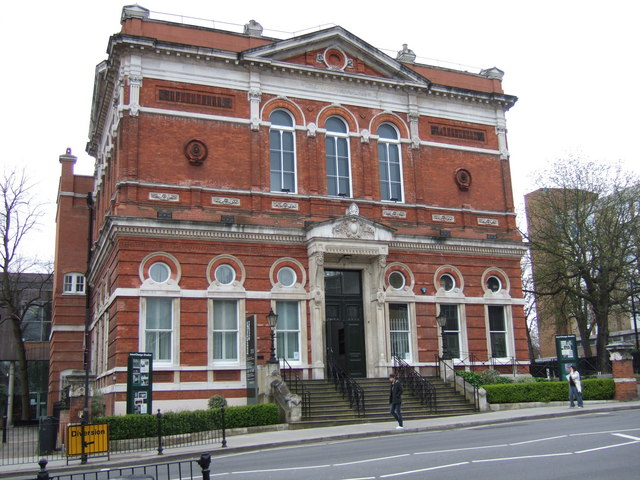
- Hampstead Town Hall

- Hampstead within the former County of London
- History
  - Created: 1900
  - Abolished: 1965
  - Succeeded by: London Borough of Camden
- Status: Metropolitan borough
- Government: Hampstead Borough Council
  - HQ: Haverstock Hill
  - Motto: Non Sibi Sed Toti (Not for self but for all)
- Coat of arms of the borough council
- Map of borough boundary

Hampstead was a civil parish and metropolitan borough in London, England. It was an ancient parish in the county of Middlesex, governed by an administrative vestry. The parish was included in the area of responsibility of the Metropolitan Board of Works in 1855 and became part of the County of London in 1889. The parish of Hampstead became a metropolitan borough in 1900, following the London Government Act 1899, with the parish vestry replaced by a borough council. In 1965 the borough was abolished and its former area became part of the London Borough of Camden in Greater London.

== Geography ==
It included Primrose Hill, Hampstead, Belsize Park, West Hampstead, South Hampstead, much of Hampstead Heath and part of Kilburn and Cricklewood. Some street signs still bear the 'Borough of Hampstead' name.

== Ecclesiastical parish ==
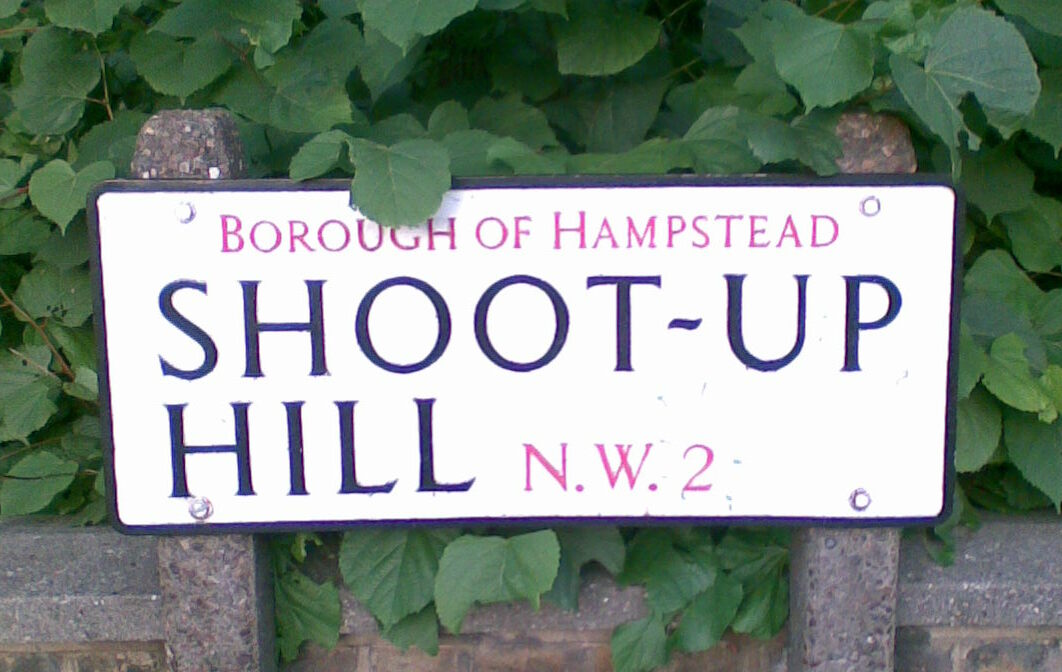
Street sign still bearing the 'Borough of Hampstead' name in 2007.

The ancient parish, was originally dedicated to St Mary, but in 1747 it was rededicated to St John. It was in the Diocese of London. From 1852, as the population of Hampstead increased, a number of new parishes were formed:

- Christ Church, Hampstead. in 1852
- St Saviour, Haverstock Hill, in 1856
- St Mary, Kilburn in 1856
- St Peter, Belsize Park in 1859
- St Paul, Avenue Road in 1864
- St Stephen, Hampstead in 1869
- Trinity, West Hampstead in 1872, (renamed Holy Trinity in c.1930)
- St Mary the Virgin, Primrose Hill in 1873
- Emmanuel, West Hampstead in 1885
- St Cuthbert, West Hampstead in 1886
- St James, West Hampstead in 1888
- St Luke, West Hampstead in 1898

In addition, as the population of neighbouring areas increased, parts of Hampstead parish were included in new parishes:

- All Souls, St John's Wood in 1865 with parts of All Saints, St John's Wood
- St Augustine, Kilburn in 1870 with parts of St Mark, Marylebone and St Saviour, Paddington

== Coat of arms ==
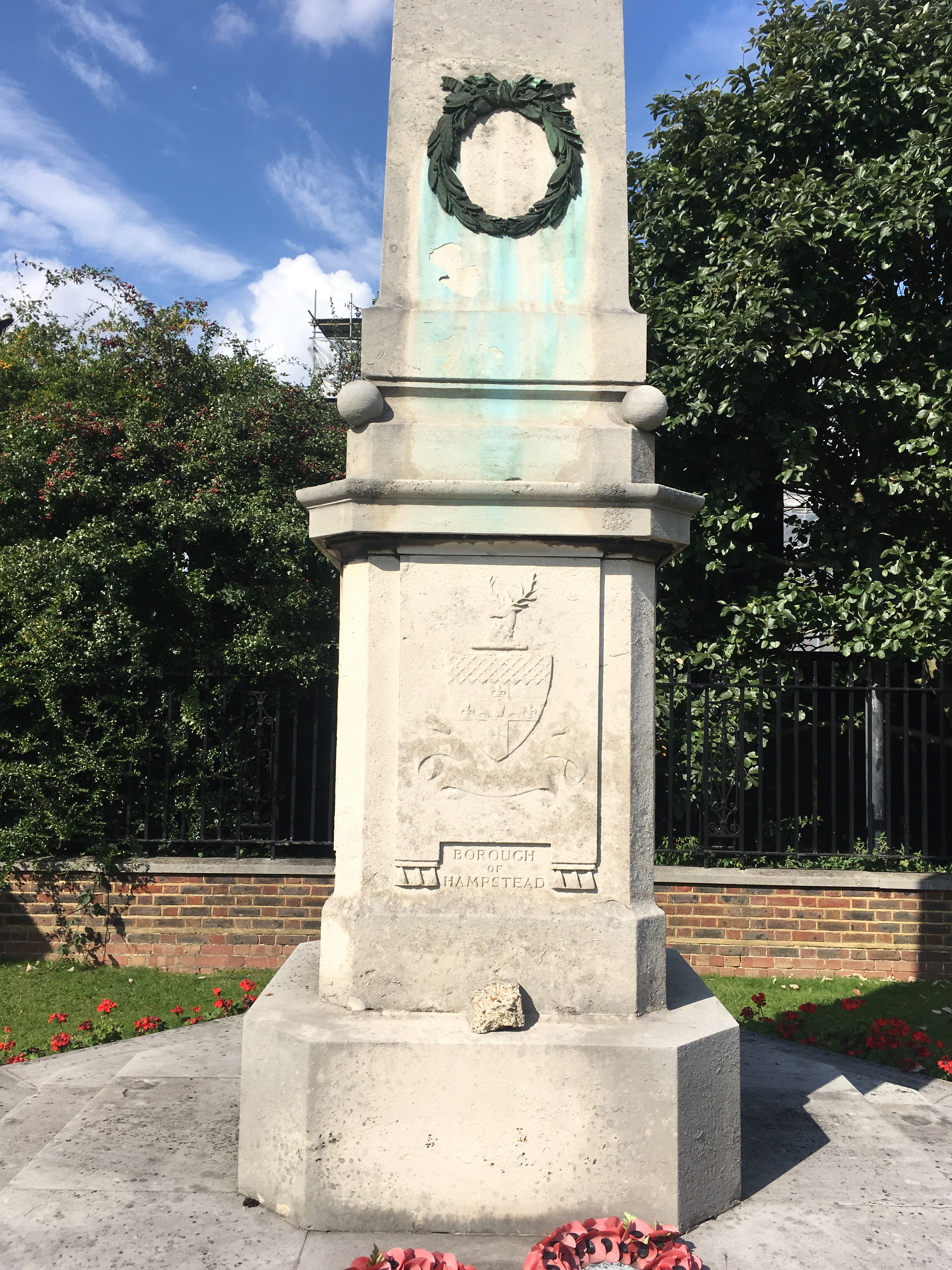
The borough's coat of arms on Hampstead War Memorial

The arms were granted in 1931, and are based on a device used by the Hampstead Vestry without authority, and adopted by the Council on its formation in 1900.

The mitre stands for the Westminster Abbey, to which the Manor of Hampstead was granted by Ethelred the Unready in 986, and remained in its possession until 1539. The fleurs-de-lys and stag's head are from the arms of the Hickes family, one of whom, Viscount Camden, purchased the Manor. On his death in 1629 it passed to the Noel family from whose arms are taken the fretty chief. The Manor was sold to Sir William Langthorne in 1707, who is represented by the white cross and red fleurs-de-lys from his arms.

The holly is from the seal of the old Hampstead Vestry, which grows profusely in the area.

Charges from these arms were used, together with charges from the coats of arms of Holborn and of St. Pancras, when the new coat of arms of the London Borough of Camden was designed in 1965.

The former coat of arms can still be seen on Hampstead War Memorial.

== Population and area ==
The metropolitan borough was conterminous with the Vestry authority, when it was formed in 1900. Statistics compiled by the London County Council, in 1901 to show the population growth in London, over the preceding century.

Hampstead had an area of 2,265 acres (9.2 km^{2}) in 1901. The populations recorded in National Censuses were:

Hampstead Vestry 1801-1899

Year	1801	1811	1821	1831	1841	1851	1861	1871	1881	1891
Population	4,434	5,483	7,263	8,588	10,093	11,986	19,106	32,281	45,452	68,416

Metropolitan Borough 1900-1961

Year	1901	1911	1921	1931	1941	1951	1961
Population	81,942	85,495	86,153	88,947		95,131	98,844

== Politics ==
A map showing the wards of Hampstead Metropolitan Borough as they appeared in 1916.

Under the Metropolis Management Act 1855 any parish that exceeded 2,000 ratepayers was to be divided into wards; however the parish of St John Hampstead did not exceed this number so was not divided into wards. By 1873 its population had increased enough for the incorporated vestry to be divided into four wards (electing vestrymen): No. 1 (18), No. 2 (15), No. 3 (15) and No. 4 (12).

In 1894 as its population had increased further so the incorporated vestry was re-divided into five wards (electing vestrymen): Town (18), Belsize (12), Adelaide (9), Kilburn (21) and West End (12).

The metropolitan borough was divided into seven wards for elections: Adelaide, Belsize, Central, Kilburn, Priory, Town and West End.

=== Parliament constituency ===
For elections to Parliament, the borough was represented by one constituency:

- Hampstead
