= Road to the Spaniards, Hampstead =

Painting by John Constable

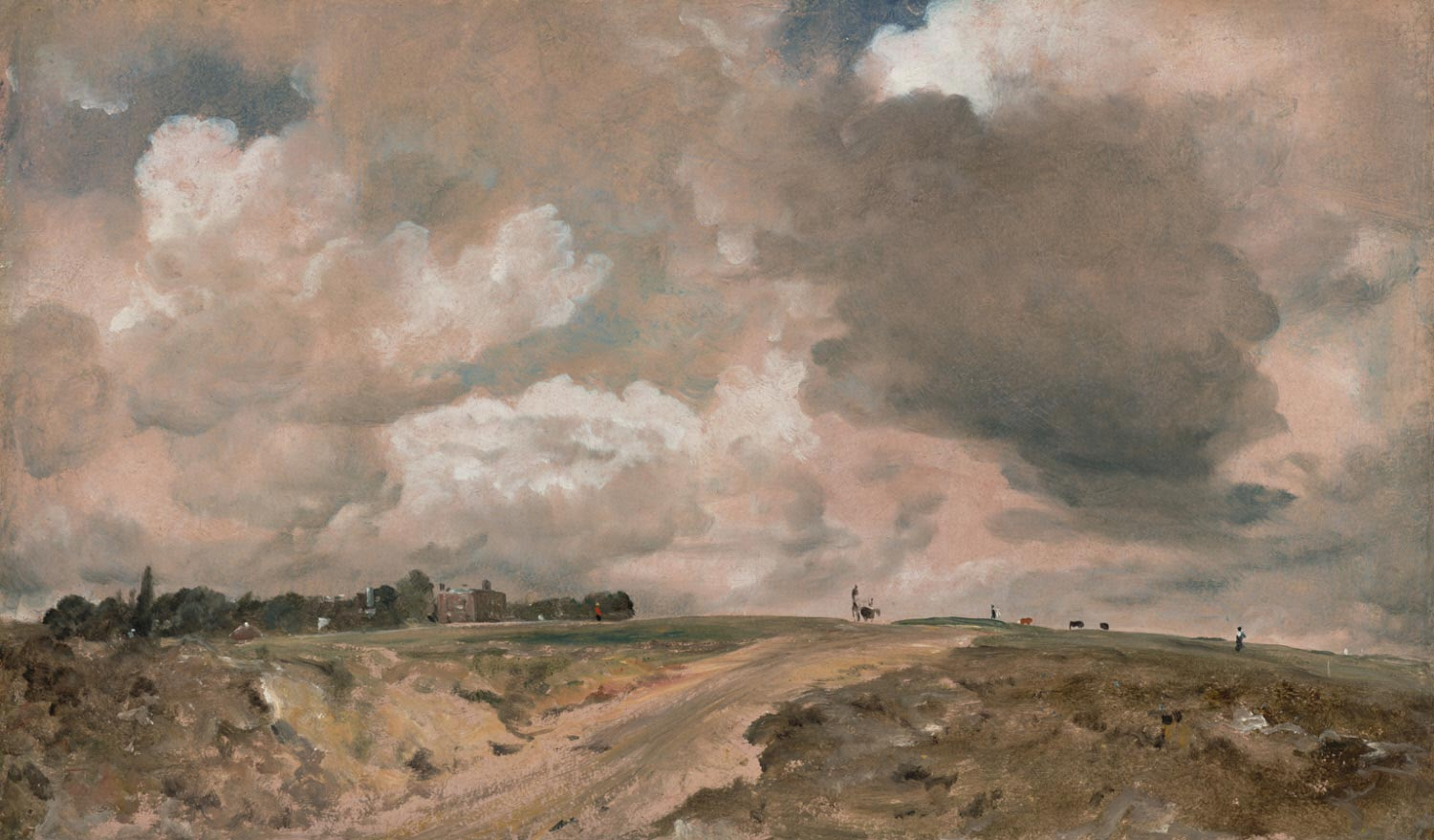
- Artist: John Constable
- Year: 1822
- Type: Oil on paper mounted on canvas, landscape painting
- Dimensions: 30.8 cm × 51.1 cm (12.1 in × 20.1 in)
- Location: Philadelphia Museum of Art; Philadelphia, Pennsylvania

Road to the Spaniards, Hampstead is an 1822 landscape painting by the British artist John Constable. It shows a view across Hampstead Heath along Spaniards Road, a route to Highgate. The building on the left is the Spaniards Inn from which the road takes its name. It was painted in July 1822 during overcast day. Constable emphasizes the skyline with looming storm clouds. Today it is in the collection of the Philadelphia Museum of Art in Pennsylvania.

== See also ==
- List of paintings by John Constable

== Bibliography ==
- Bailey, Anthony. John Constable: A Kingdom of his Own. Random House, 2012.
- Charles, Victoria. Constable. Parkstone International, 2015.
- Hamilton, James. Constable: A Portrait. Hachette UK, 2022.
- Reynolds, Graham. Constable's England. Metropolitan Museum of Art, 1983.
