= North End, Hampstead =

Area in the London Borough of Camden

Coordinates: 51°34′3″N 0°10′53″W

North End
- Suburb of London
- London borough: Camden; Barnet
- Ceremonial county: Greater London
- Region: London
- Post town: LONDON
- Postcode district: NW3
- Dialling code: 020
- Police
- Fire
- Ambulance
- UK Parliament: Hampstead and Highgate
- London Assembly: Barnet and Camden

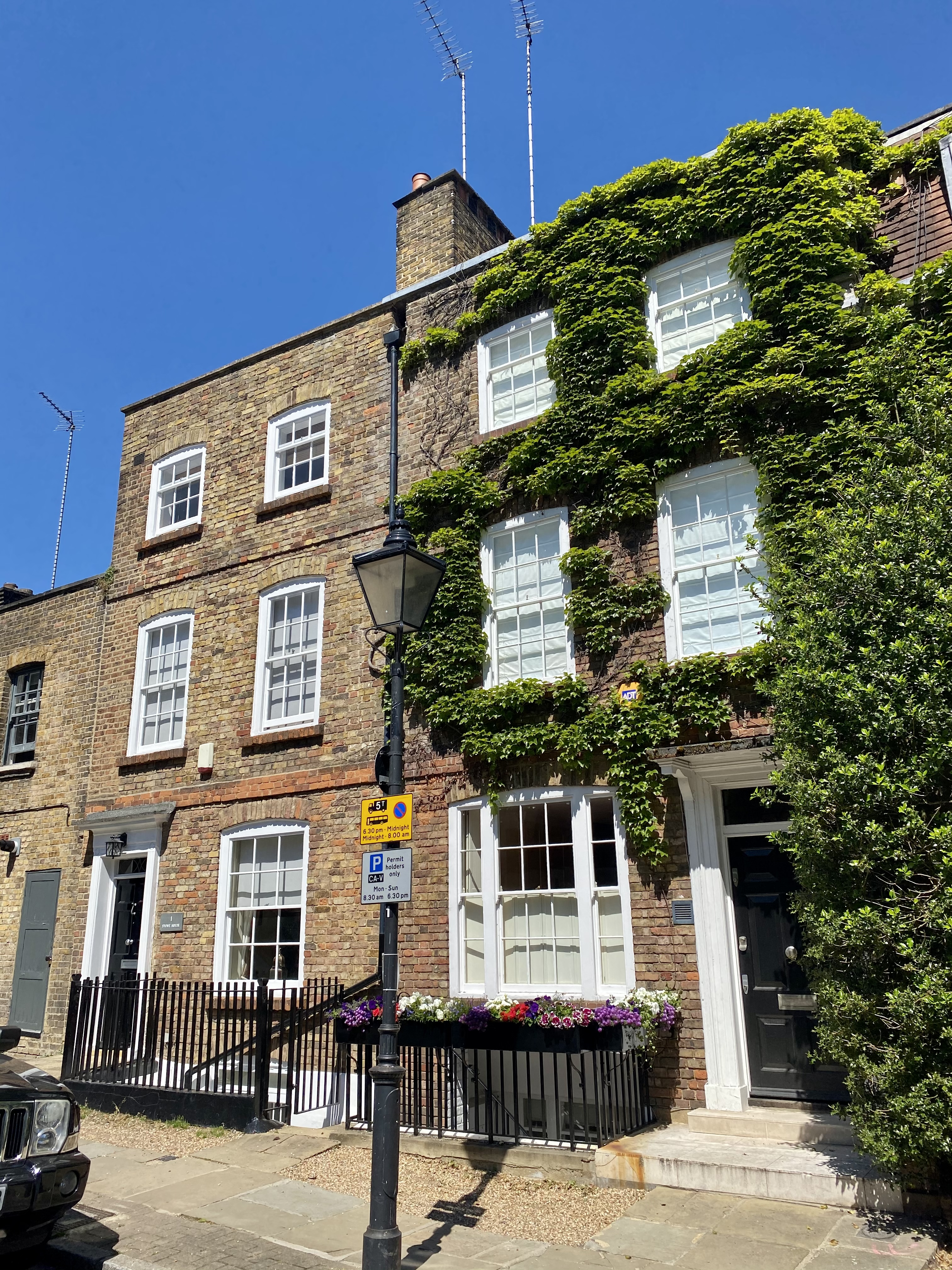
Historic houses in North End.

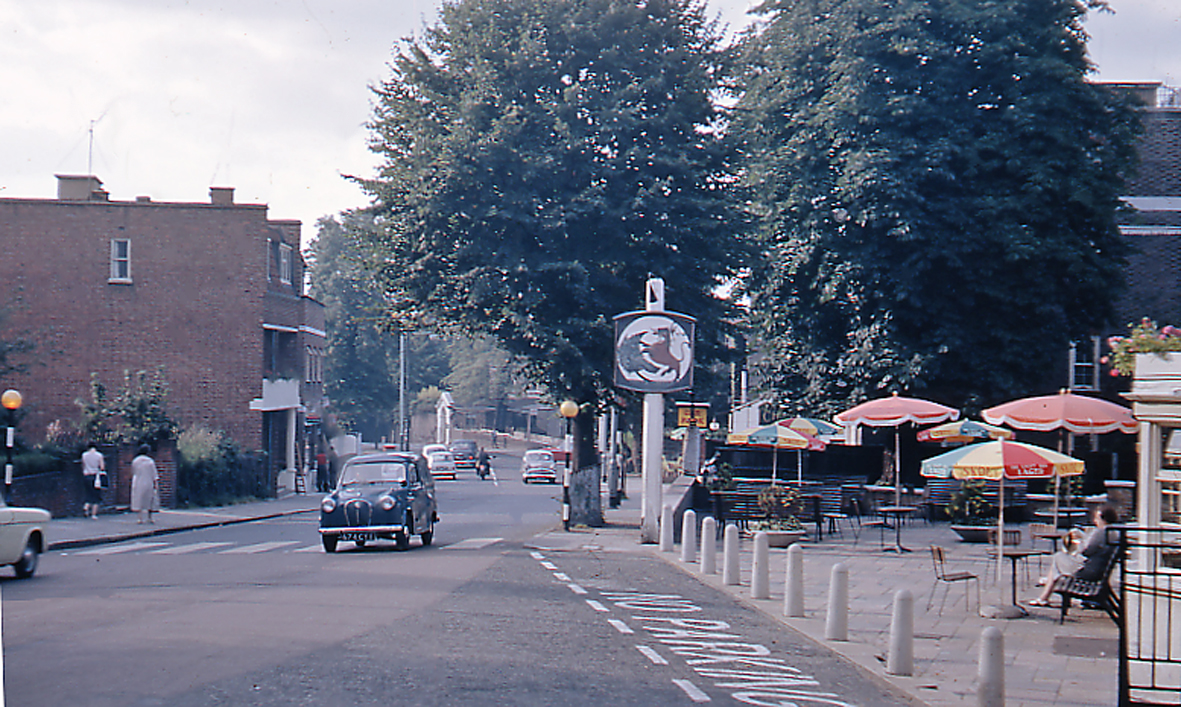
Street outside The Old Bull and Bush in 1962.

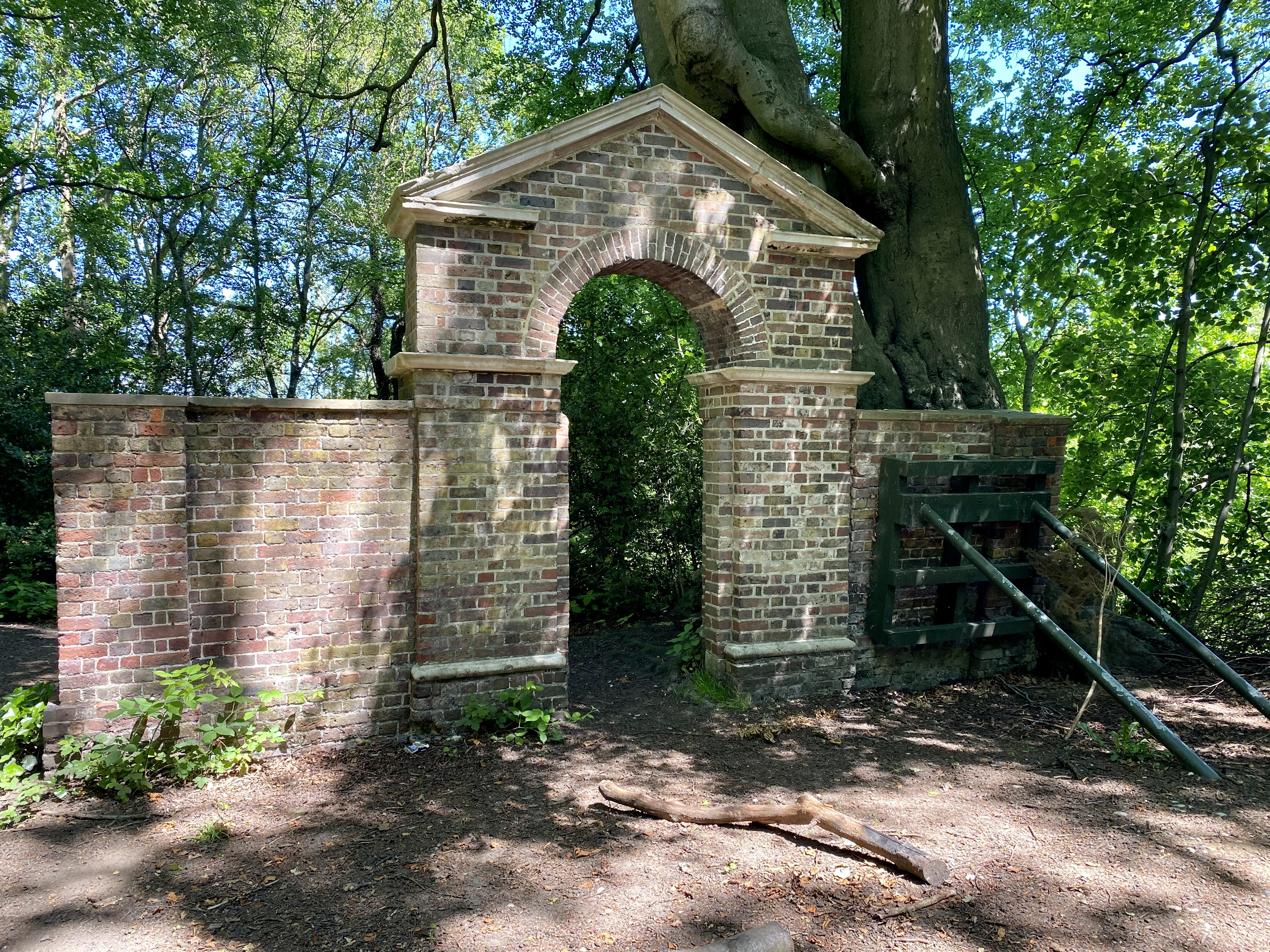
Grade II listed archway to the demolished Pitt House.

North End is located on the northern edge of Hampstead, just south of Golders Green. For much of its existence it was a rural hamlet but is now part of suburban London. Hampstead Heath lies both east and west of the settlement, while Hampstead Garden Suburb is to its northeast connected by Hampstead Way. It sits on the border between the London Borough of Camden (including most of Hampstead to the south) and the London Borough of Barnet. North End Way connects it with Hampstead Village.

== History ==
The first houses at North End date from about 1666, with cottages grouped around a village pond, between the two coaching inns, Spaniards Inn and Jack Straw's Castle.

North End is particularly known for The Old Bull and Bush pub which was first licensed in 1721, and was a popular destination for daytripping Londoners in the eighteenth and nineteenth centuries after the development of Hampstead Wells. Off Hampstead Way is the historic Wyldes Farm where blue plaques mark former residents William Blake and John Linnell. A plaque marks Pitt House, the former site of the home of the Prime Minister William Pitt the Elder in North End Avenue.

== Abandoned tube station ==
In the Edwardian era the Northern Line proposed an extension to Golders Green via Hampstead. An intermediate stop at North End was a key part of the plan. A large swathe of new housing was anticipated in the area. However conservationist Henrietta Barnett acquired the land from Eton College and donated it as the Hampstead Heath Extension. In 1906 the partially-built station was put on hold. Although further housebuilding took place in the vicinity, the station was never finished. Consequently, there is a comparatively long gap between Hampstead and Golders Green station. Had the station opened, it would have been the deepest on the London Underground.

== Bibliography ==
- Bard, Robert. Hampstead & Highgate Through Time. Amberley Publishing Limited, 2015.
- Dakers, Caroline. The Blue Plaque Guide to London. Macmillan, 1981.
- Martin, Andrew. Underground, Overground: A Passenger's History of the Tube. Profile Books, 2012.
- Sexby, John James. Municipal Parks, Gardens, and Open Spaces of London. Cambridge University Press, 2014.
- Yonge, Mark. Unfinished Lines: Rediscovering the Remains of Railways Never Completed. Pen and Sword Transport, 2022.
