= North End Way =

Street in Hampstead, London

Coordinates: 51.56540°N 0.18091°W

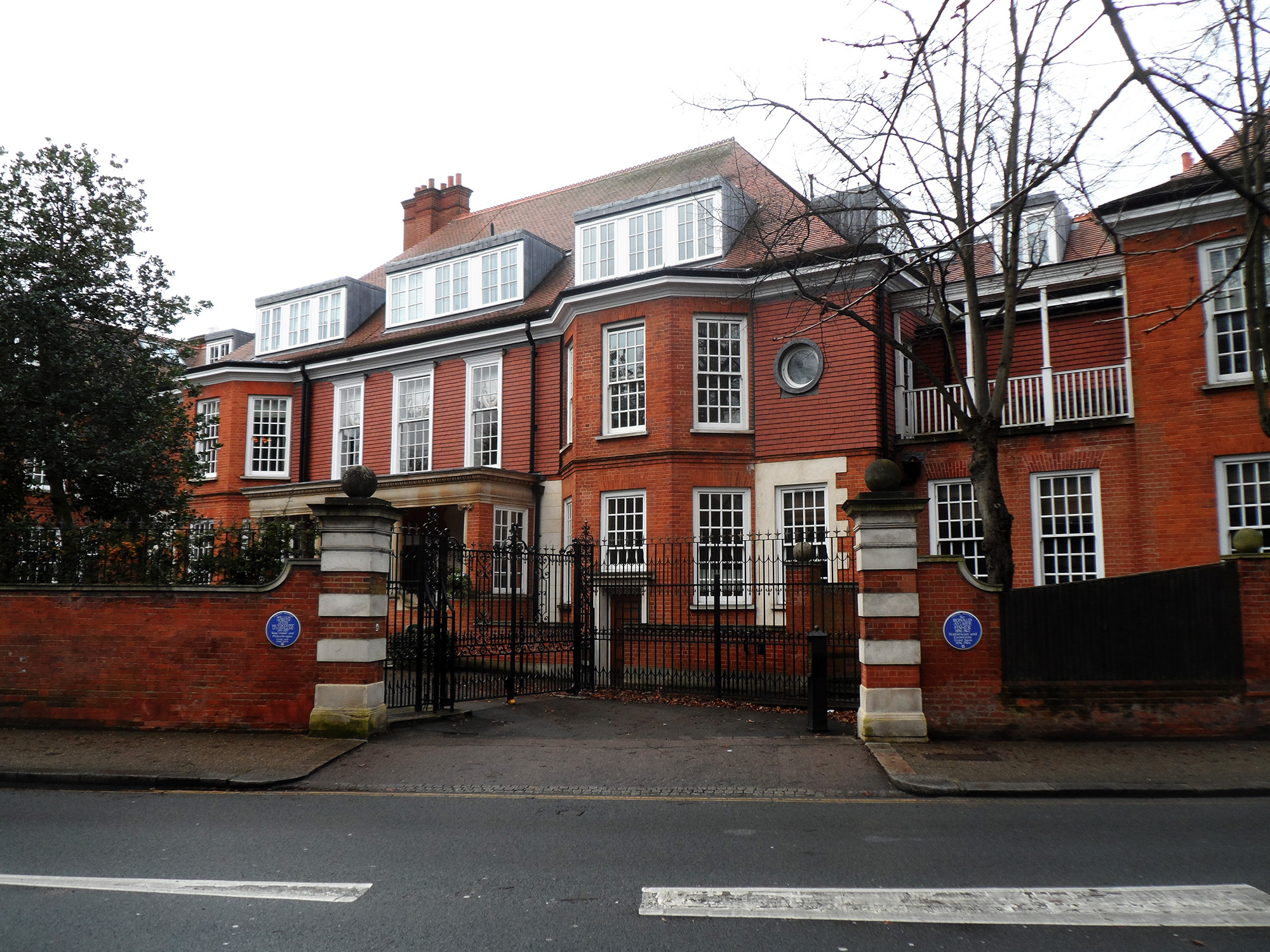
Inverforth House with a blue plaques commemorating Lord Leverhulme and Sir Ronald Fisher.

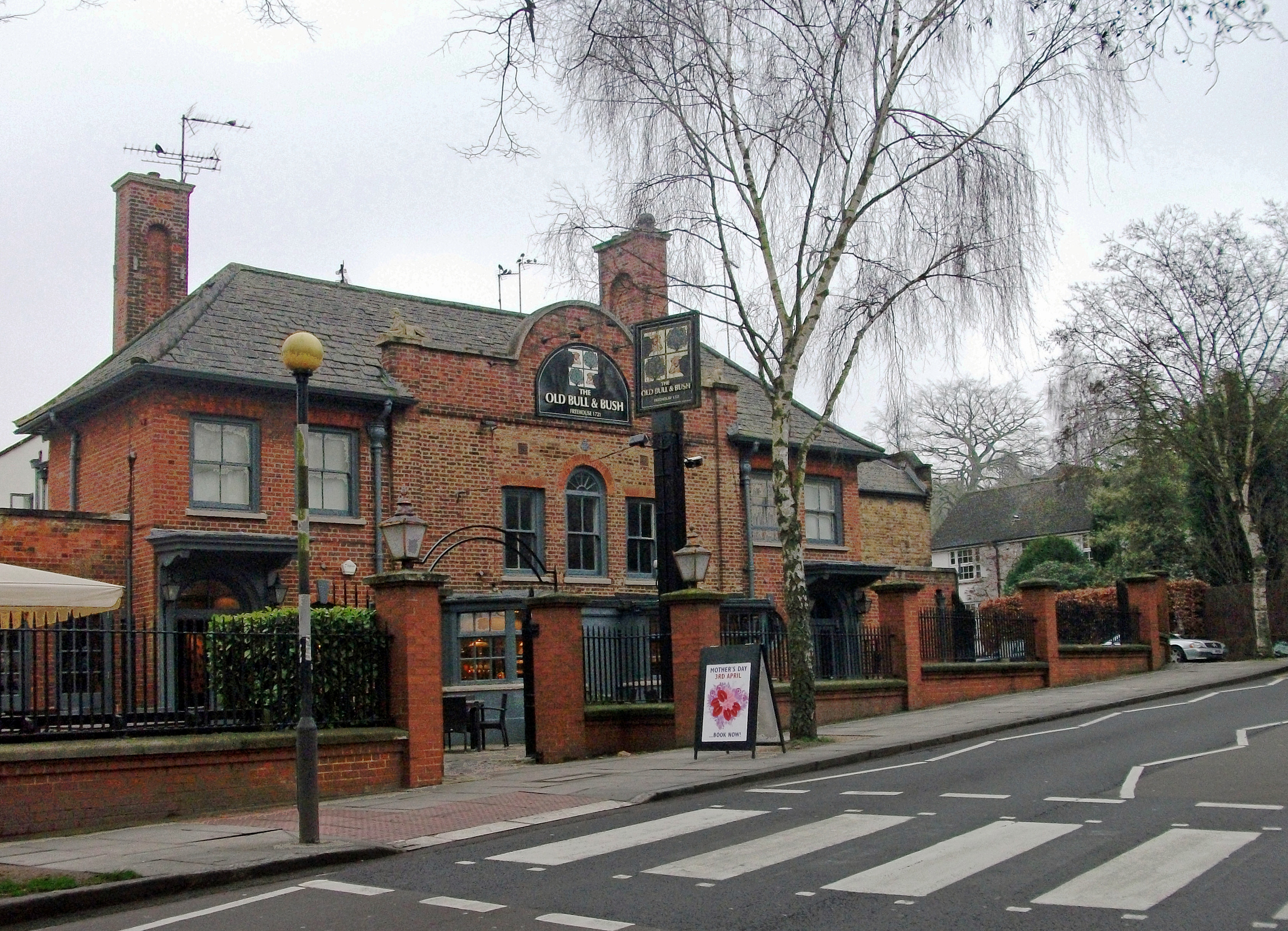
The Old Bull and Bush pub.

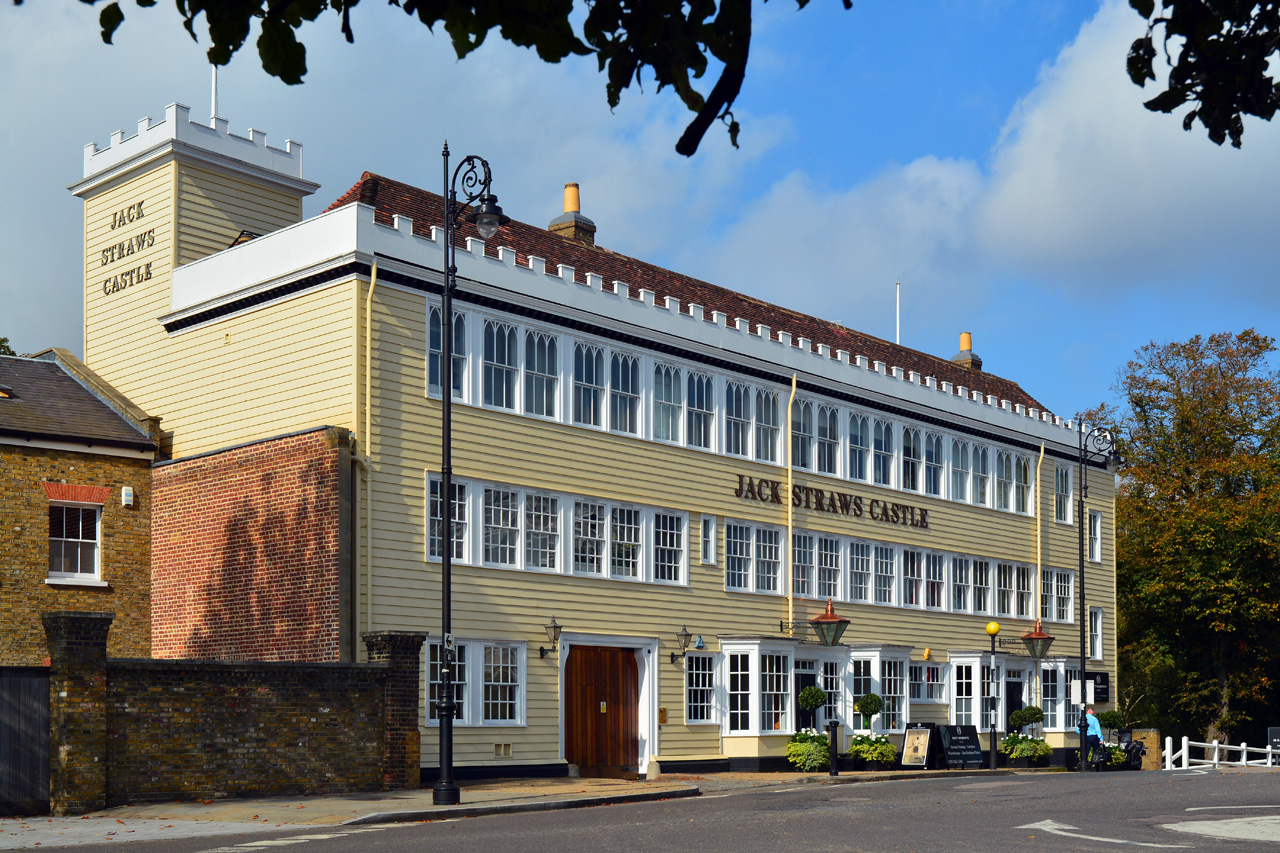
Jack Straw's Castle.

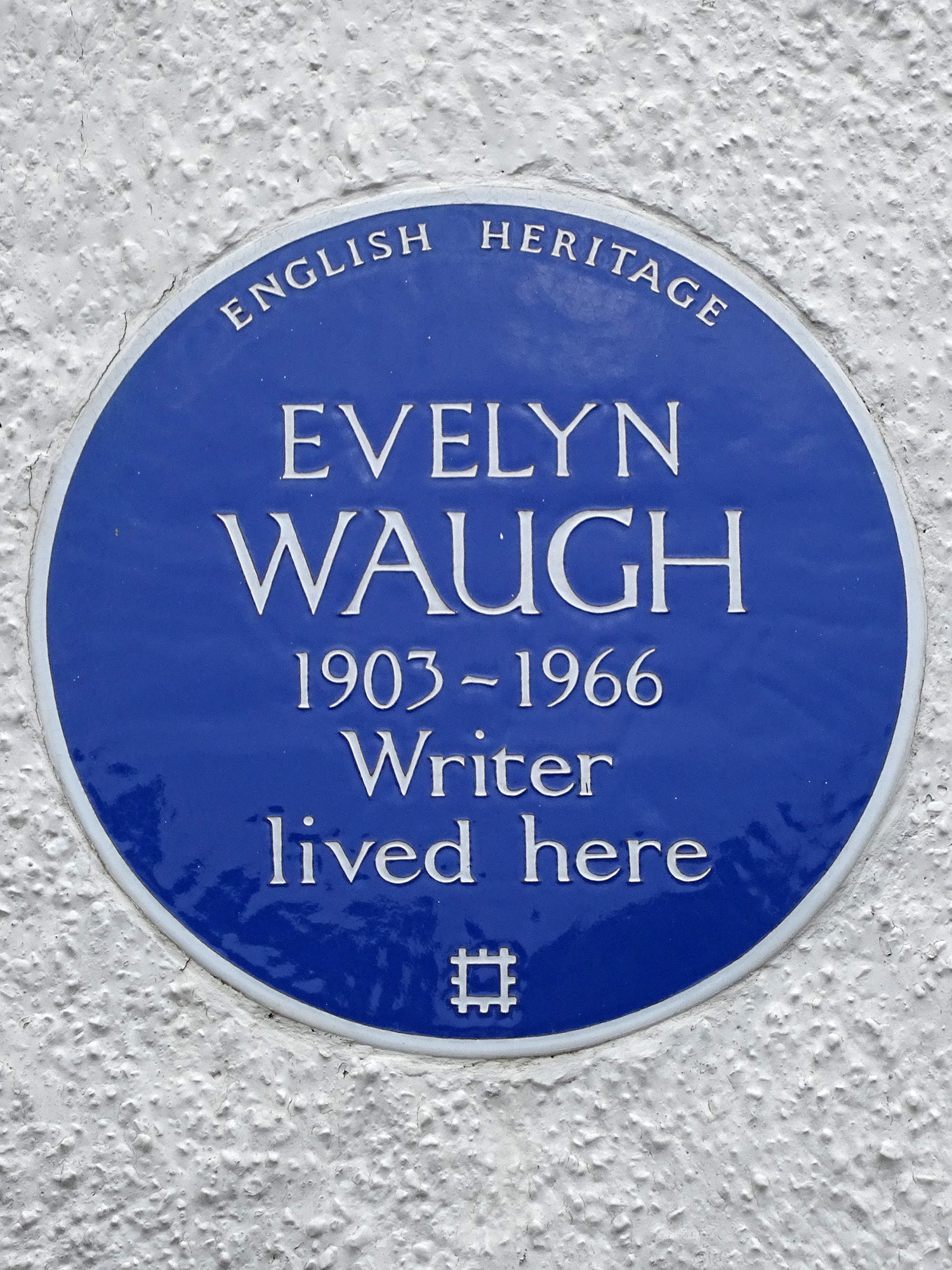
Blue plaque for the writer Evelyn Waugh on North End Road.

North End Way is a street in Hampstead in the London Borough of Camden, today a stretch of the A502 road. At the boundary with the London Borough of Barnet it becomes North End Road running northwards into Golders Green where it terminates at the junction with Finchley Road, by the tube station. North End Way passes through Hampstead Heath.

The name derives from the North End of the old village of Hampstead, with similarly named roads West End Lane and South End Green marking other boundaries. At its southern end is the former pub Jack Straw's Castle, located where Heath Street forks into North End Way and Spaniards Road by the Hampstead War Memorial and Heath House. Near the northern end of North End Way is the historic The Old Bull and Bush pub dating back to the seventeenth century. Nearby is the never-completed North End tube station on the Northern Line, whose opening was abandoned in 1906 when a planned large housing estate nearby was instead made into the Hampstead Heath Extension. Hampstead Way and North End road both run east of North End Way where the historic hamlet of North End was located.

Inverforth House was the home of the industrialist and philanthropist Lord Leverhulme who is now commemorated with a blue plaque as is Sir Ronald Fisher, statistician and biologist. Evelyn Waugh lived at 145 North End Road, Golders Green and has a blue plaque as does the surgeon Sir William Bowman who lived nearby.

== Bibliography ==
- Bebbington, Gillian. London Street Names. Batsford, 1972.
- Cherry, Bridget & Pevsner, Nikolaus. London 4: North. Yale University Press, 2002.
- Wade, Christopher. The Streets of Hampstead. Camden History Society, 2000.
