= Hampstead War Memorial =

War memorial in London, England

Coordinates: 51°33′45.86″N 0°10′46.74″W

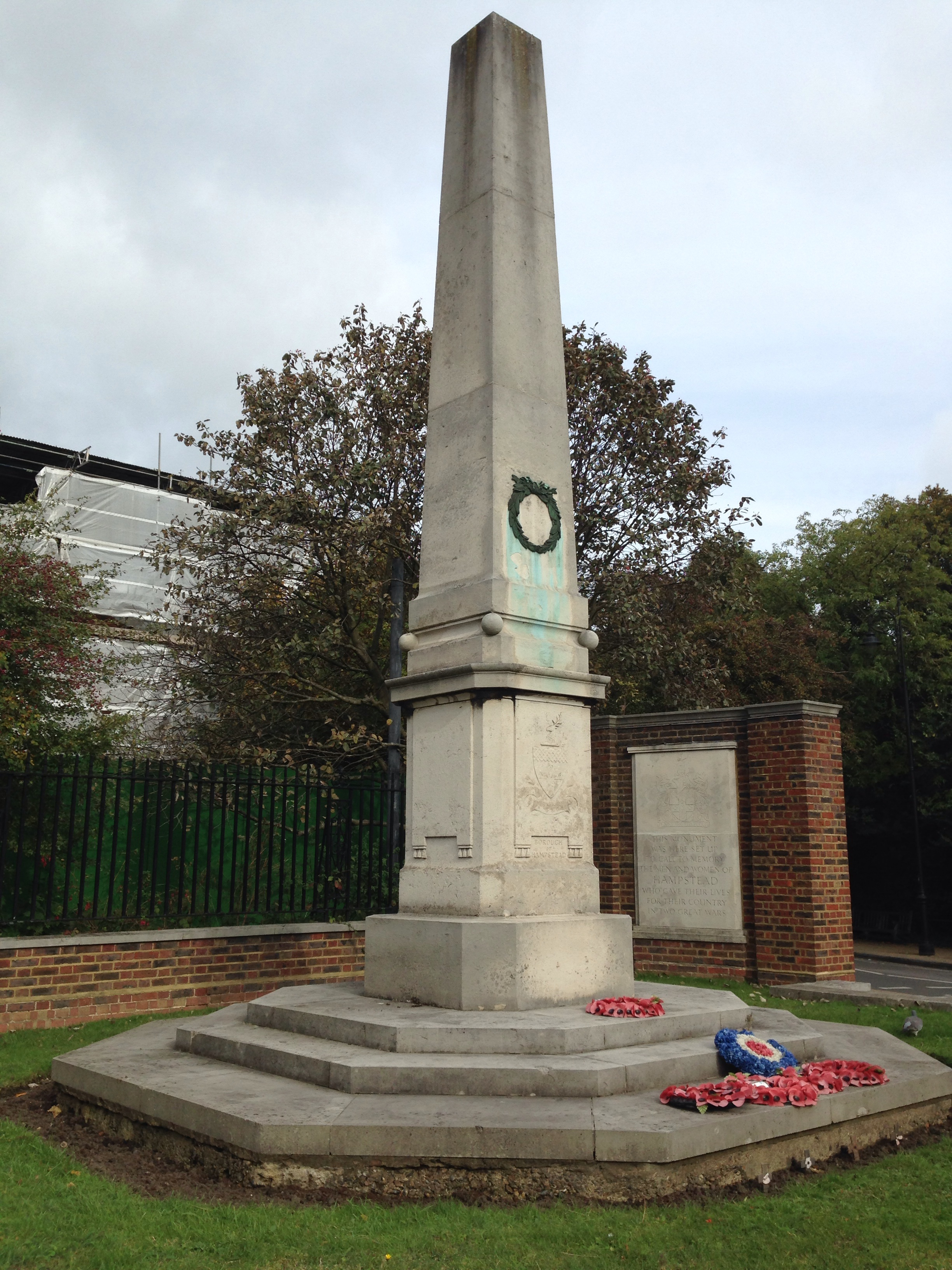
The memorial in November 2016.

The Hampstead War Memorial is located in front of Heath House opposite Jack Straw's Castle, on the northern fringes of Hampstead Heath in London where North End Way, Heath Street and Spaniards Road meet. The memorial marks the deaths of local individuals who died fighting in the First World War and the Second World War. It was dedicated on 4 May 1922 by the Bishop of Willesden, William Perrin, in a ceremony attended by Major General Sir Charles Vere Ferrers Townshend. The memorial is a tall thin stone obelisk on a square plinth with a three-step base.

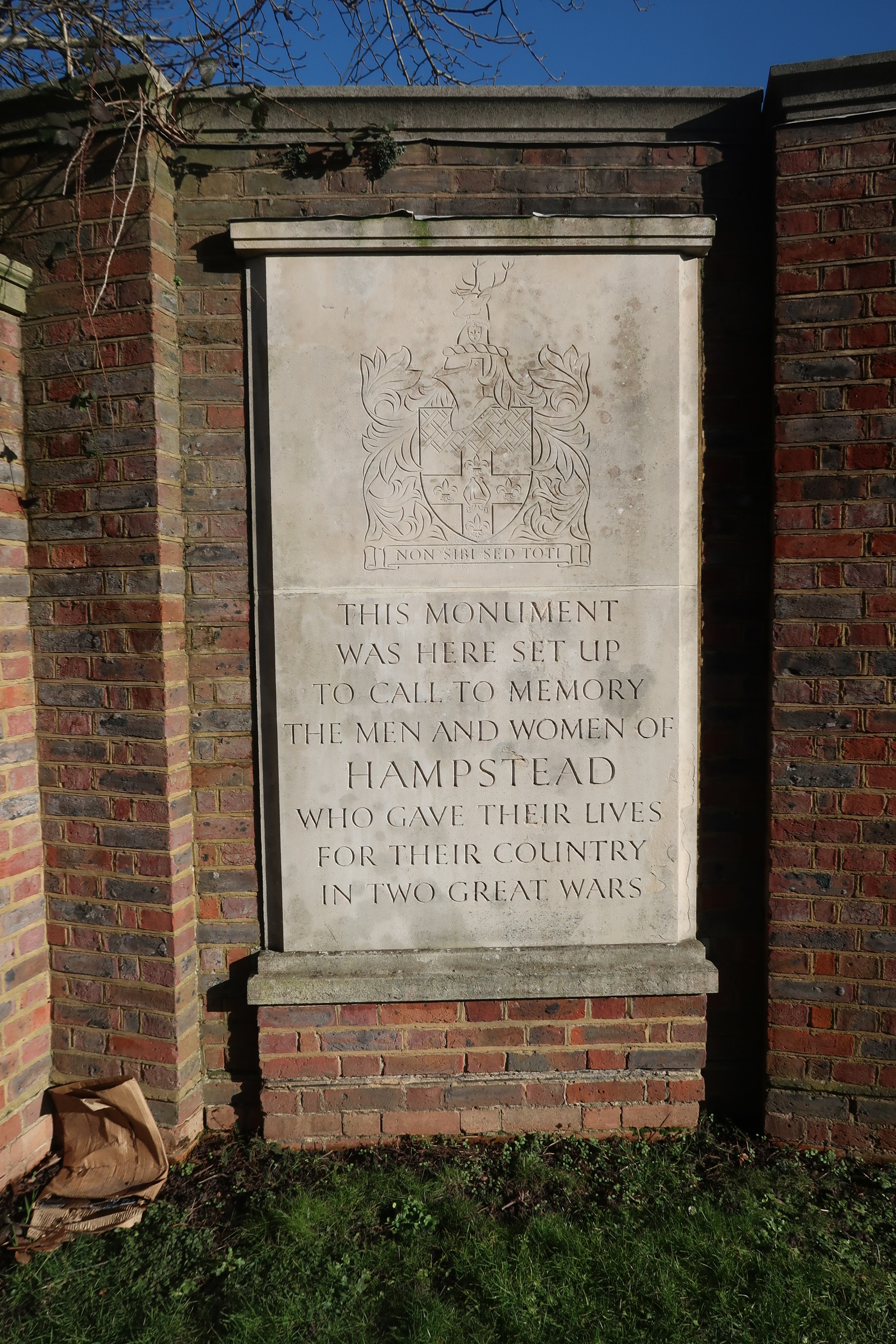
Inscription: "This monument was here set up to call to memory the men and women of Hampstead who gave their lives for their country in two Great Wars"

The memorial has been Grade II listed on the National Heritage List for England since 2015.
