= Spaniards Inn =

Pub in London, between Hampstead and Highgate

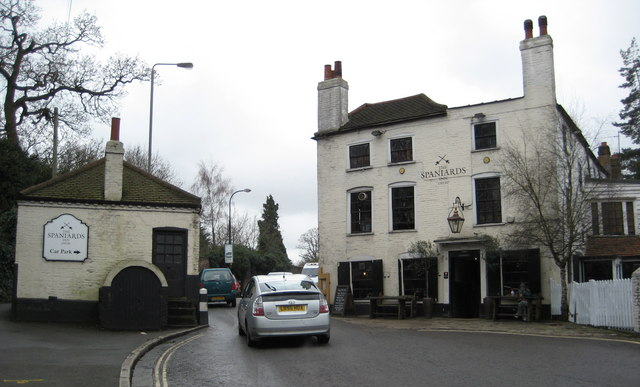
- Spaniards Inn on the right and tollhouse on the left

- Location within London Borough of Barnet Location within Greater London

General information
- Location: Hampstead Heath near Kenwood House, London, England
- Coordinates: 51.57°N 0.174°W

Design and construction
- Designations

Listed Building – Grade II
- Official name: Spaniards Inn
- Designated: 18 October 1949
- Reference no.: 1064863

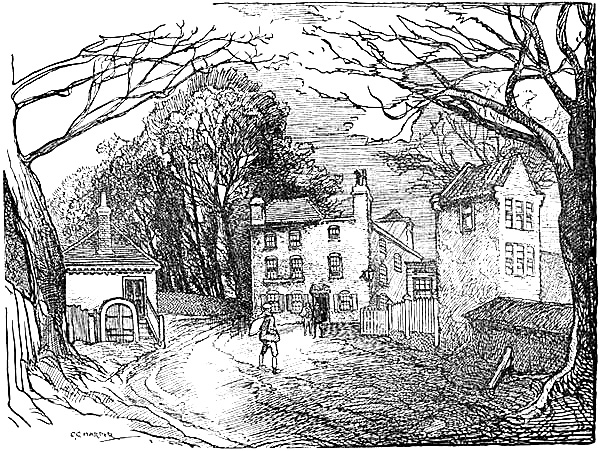
Spaniards Inn in 1906

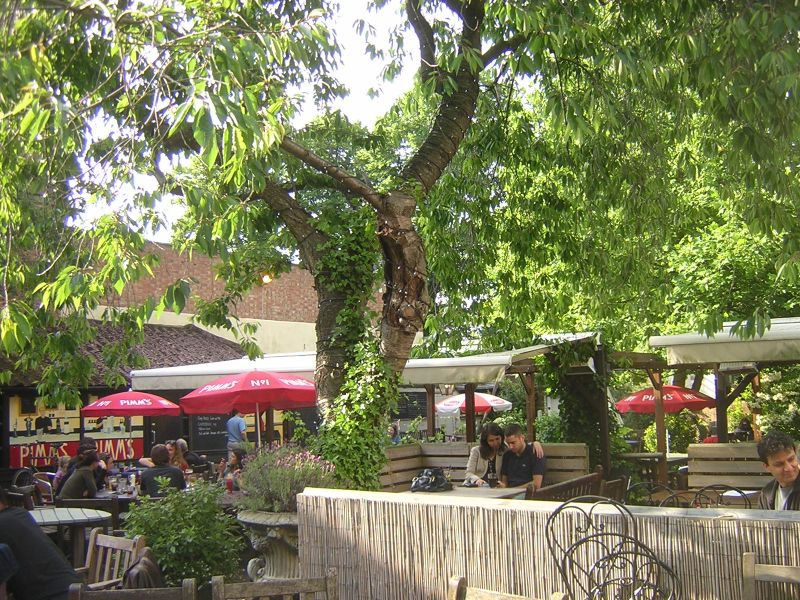
Garden of the Spaniard's Inn on a sunny lunchtime

The Spaniards Inn is a historic pub on Spaniards Road between Hampstead and Highgate in London, England. It lies on the edge of Hampstead Heath near Kenwood House. It is a Grade II listed building, dating back to the 16th century.

== History ==
The pub is believed to have been built in 1585 on the Finchley boundary, with the tavern forming the entrance to the Bishop of London's estate; an original boundary stone from 1755 can still be seen in the front garden. Opposite it, there is a toll house built in around 1710. Today, the pub is in Barnet and the tollhouse is in Camden: both are now listed buildings, and traffic is reduced to one lane between the two. A suggestion in 1966 to demolish the tollhouse was successfully resisted, partly on the grounds that it would lead to more and faster traffic.

Dick Turpin is thought to have been a regular at the Inn, as his father had been its landlord. What is certain is that highwaymen frequented this area and likely used the Inn to watch the road; at that time the Inn was around two hours from London by coach and the area had its fair share of wealthy travellers. Records from the Old Bailey show that on 16 October 1751 Samuel Bacon was indicted for robbery on the King's Highway, and was caught 200 yards from the Spaniards.

In 1780, rioters involved in the Gordon Riots, opposed to the relaxation of laws in England that restricted Catholicism, marched on Hampstead, intent on attacking Kenwood House, the home of William Murray, 1st Earl of Mansfield. The landlord of the Spaniards at the time is reported to have given them free drinks, keeping the rioters occupied until the local militia arrived, thus saving the house. In 1822, John Constable produced a landscape painting called Road to the Spaniards, Hampstead.

== In literature ==
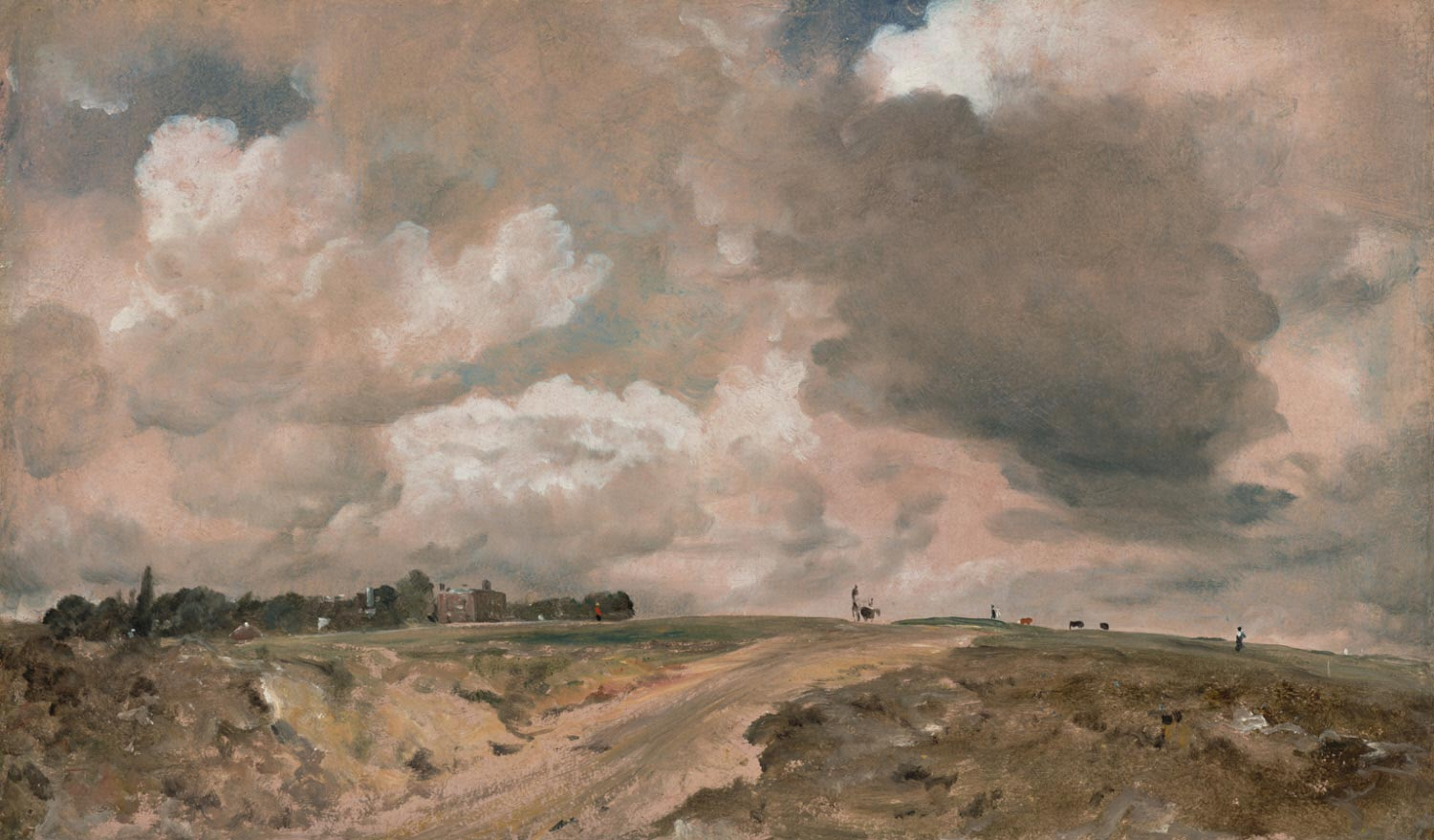
Road to the Spaniards, Hampstead by John Constable, 1822.

The pub is mentioned in Dickens's The Pickwick Papers and Bram Stoker's Dracula, and was frequented by the artist Joshua Reynolds and the poets Byron and Keats. According to the pub, Keats wrote his Ode to a Nightingale in the gardens, and Stoker borrowed one of their resident ghost stories to furnish the plot of Dracula.

The Inn features in The Man of Property, the first of The Forsyte Saga novels by John Galsworthy. Soames Forsyte take the architect Philip Bosinny to dine at the Spaniards Inn to discuss the building of his house at Robin Hill.

== Food ==
In 2007, The Spaniards Inn was listed in 4th place by The Guardian in an article detailing the "Top 10 UK pub roasts". It was also listed by The Guardian as one of Britain's Best Pubs in 2009.
