= Spaniards Road =

Street in London, England

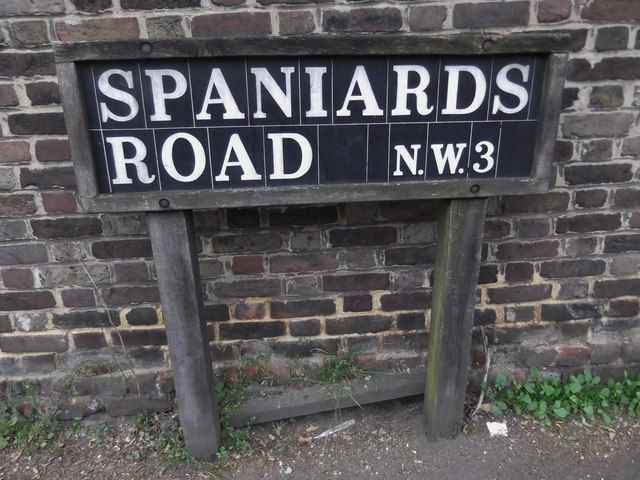
Street sign.

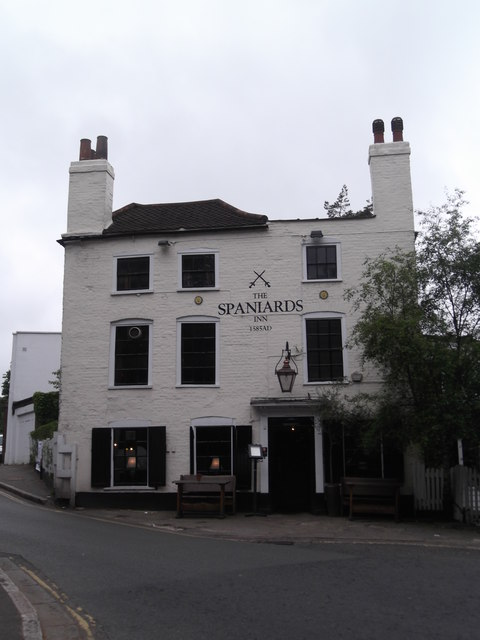
Spaniards Inn from which the road takes its name.

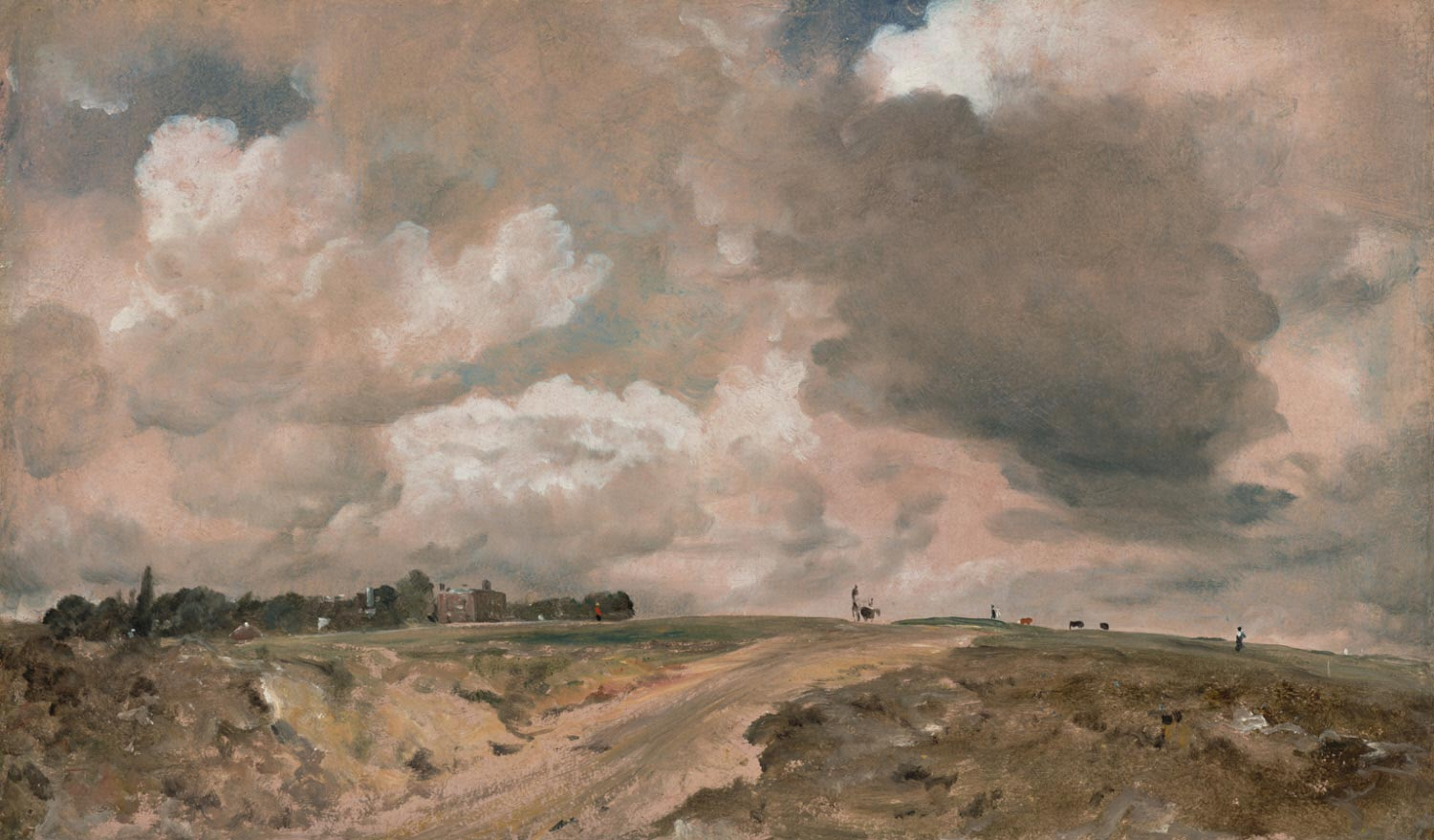
Road to the Spaniards, Hampstead. 1822 painting by John Constable depicting the road across the heath.

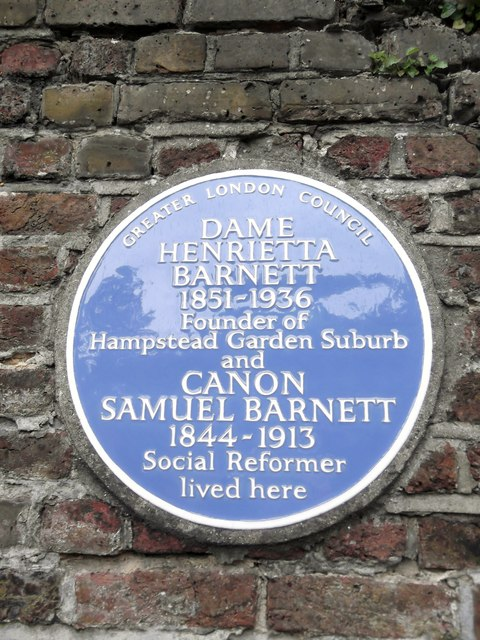
Blue plaque commemorating Henrietta Barnett, the founder of Hampstead Garden Suburb, and her husband.

Spaniards Road is a street in Hampstead in the London Borough of Camden. It runs northwards from the junction of Heath Street and North End Way, close to the Hampstead War Memorial and Jack Straw's Castle, cutting through Hampstead Heath before becoming Hampstead Lane which then turns eastwards towards Highgate. It is designated part of the B519 Road.

The road takes its name from the Spaniards Inn public house which dates back to the sixteenth century. While there are many stories concerning the origin of the name, it most likely dates back to a Spanish ambassador who stayed there. A surviving tollhouse stands opposite the Inn. Historically located some way outside London, the stretch of road was notorious for highwaymen. John Constable painted the view across the heath towards the Inn in 1822.

In Grahame Greene's novel Stamboul Train written in 1932 one of the characters, Myatt, refers to Spaniards Road as a place to pick up young women.

A blue plaque commemorates the former residence of Henrietta Barnett, the founder of nearby Hampstead Garden Suburb, and her husband Samuel Barnett, a social reformer. The northern stretch of the road marks the boundary with the London Borough of Barnet which contains Hampstead Garden Suburb itself. A number of buildings on or just off the road are now listed. Spaniards End and Kenwood Close both curve off the northern end of the street, with the latter featuring a blue plaque for actor Ralph Richardson.

== Bibliography ==
- Bebbington, Gillian. London Street Names. Batsford, 1972.
- Cherry, Bridget & Pevsner, Nikolaus. London 4: North. Yale University Press, 2002.
- McMurdo, Lucy. Hampstead & Highgate in 50 Buildings. Amberley Publishing Limited, 2022.
