= Heath House, London =

Mansion on Hampstead Heath, London, England

Coordinates: 51.5631°N 0.1796°W

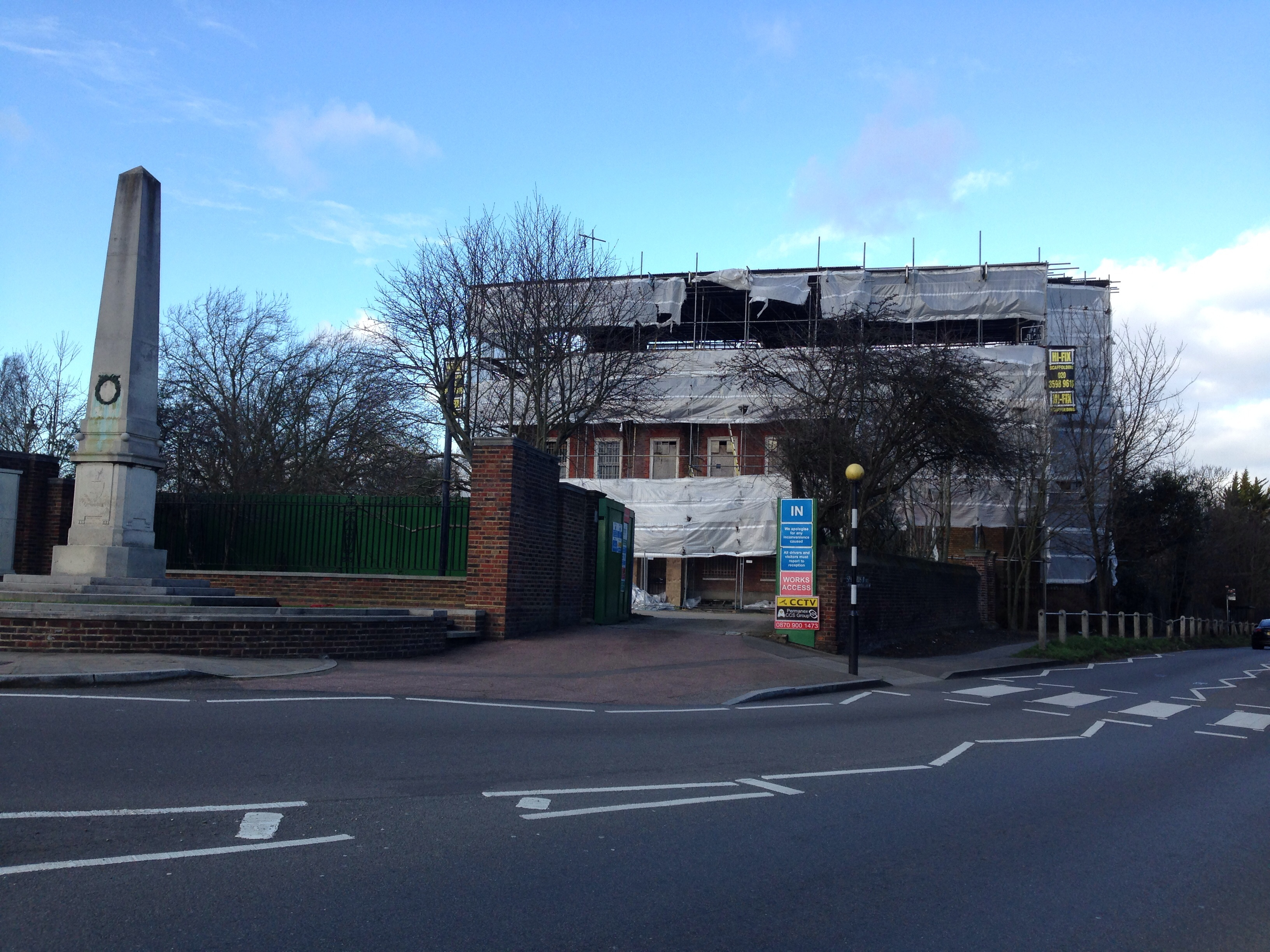
Heath House behind scaffolding in 2016

Heath House is a historic mansion on Hampstead Heath. It is Grade II* listed and located on Hampstead's North End Way in the London Borough of Camden. It is located at the highest point upon leaving the capital, about four miles north of Trafalgar Square. The Hampstead War Memorial stands in front of the house.

From 1790 Heath House was the family seat of banker and philanthropist Sir Samuel Hoare, who entertained many notable figures there, particularly writers and poets. The house remained in the Hoare family until it was badly damaged in the Second World War; it was then sold, passing through several families over the decades. As of January 2023, the house is once more empty and awaiting restoration.

== Seat of Hoare family ==
Samuel Hoare was a banker from a Quaker background. A younger brother, Jonathan Hoare, made his family seat in a village about the same distance from the City as Hampstead, namely Stoke Newington; Paradise House, now known as Clissold House, and its surrounding parkland are now open to the public as Clissold Park.

There are several branches of the Hoare family which have been involved in the City for example those connected with the broking firm Hoare Govett, or those connected with the small private bank C. Hoare & Co, who are only most distantly related. The Quaker branch of the family (the residents of Heath House) is the one which played a significant part in philanthropy and public life, for example in the movement for abolition of slavery by co-founding The Society for the Abolition of the Slave Trade. Several members of the family became members of Parliament, including Sir Samuel Hoare, 1st Baronet who held the Norwich seat, his son Sir Samuel Hoare, who was Foreign Secretary, Home Secretary and was created Viscount Templewood, and Edward Brodie Hoare, who held the Hampstead seat.

In the banking world the family bank, Barnett Hoare & Co of Lombard Street was one of the City's most prestigious merchant banks which eventually merged with Lloyds Bank, with the combined bank retaining the Lloyds name and adopting the Barnett Hoare logo of the black horse (which is still in use as of 2024). Edward Hoare, the senior member of the bank at the time of the merger, then served as deputy chairman of Lloyds.

Samuel Hoare entertained generously. William Howitt referred to Heath House as "Mr Hoare's hopitable mansion". According to Edward Walford (1878):

The poet Crabbe was a frequent visitor at the hospitable residence of Mr. Samuel Hoare, on the Heath. Campbell writes: "The last time I saw Crabbe was when I dined with him at the house of Mr. Hoare, at Hampstead. He very kindly came to the coach to see me off, and I never pass that spot on the top of Hampstead Heath without thinking of him." The mansion is called "The Hill," and was the seat of Mr. Samuel Hoare, the banker. Here used to congregate the great poets of the age, Rogers, Wordsworth, Coleridge, Campbell, Lucy Aikin, Mrs. Marcet, and Agnes and Joanna Baillie; whilst the centre of the gathering was the poet Crabbe. In the "Life of the Rev. George Crabbe," by his son, we read: "During his first and second visits to London my father spent a good deal of his time beneath the hospitable roof of the late Samuel Hoare, Esq., on Hampstead Heath. He owed his introduction to this respectable family to his friend Mr. Bowles, and the author of the delightful 'Excursions in the West,' Mr. Warner; and though Mr. Hoare was an invalid, and little disposed to form new connections, he was so much gratified with Mr. Crabbe's manners and conversation, that their acquaintance grew into an affectionate and lasting intimacy. Mr. Crabbe, in subsequent years, made Hampstead his head-quarters on his spring visits, and only repaired thence occasionally to the brilliant circles of the metropolis."

The poet Joanna Baillie wrote of her visits there:

It is a goodly sight through the clear air,'
From Hampstead's healthy height, to see at once
England's vast capital in fair expanse—
Towers, belfries, lengthen'd streets, and structures fair.
St. Paul's high dome amidst the vassal bands
Of neighbouring spires a regal chieftain stands;
And over fields of ridgy roofs appear,
With distance softly tinted, side by side
In kindred grace, like twain of sisters dear,
The Towers of Westminster, her Abbey's pride.

Samuel Hoare had a son by his first marriage, of the same name, who in 1806 married Louisa Gurney, of the Norwich banking family. Her siblings included Elizabeth Fry, the prison reformer, Joseph John Gurney (1788–1847) and Samuel Gurney (1786–1856), philanthropists, and Daniel Gurney (1791–1880), banker and antiquary. The Hoares worked with William Wilberforce in the fight for abolition of slavery.

== Recent history and current status ==
After the war, the house remained largely unoccupied and deteriorated since it left the Hoare family's ownership. It was bought by Donald Forrester, who undertook a major renovation on the building and the grounds. It then became a Forrester family home for several years. From 1971 to 1977 Heath House was the home of Peter King, owner of Screen International (King Publications). It was sold in 1977 to property owner John Sunley and then acquired in 1979 by a prominent Saudi Arabian family.

Over the last few decades, with changes of ownership, Heath House has fallen into a state of disrepair. Planning applications to convert the derelict building into flats were rejected in 2019. Heath House remains clad in scaffolding to preserve its exterior until a decision is made about its future.
