= Jack Straw's Castle, Hampstead =

Former pub in Hampstead, London

Coordinates: 51°33′46″N 0°10′48″W

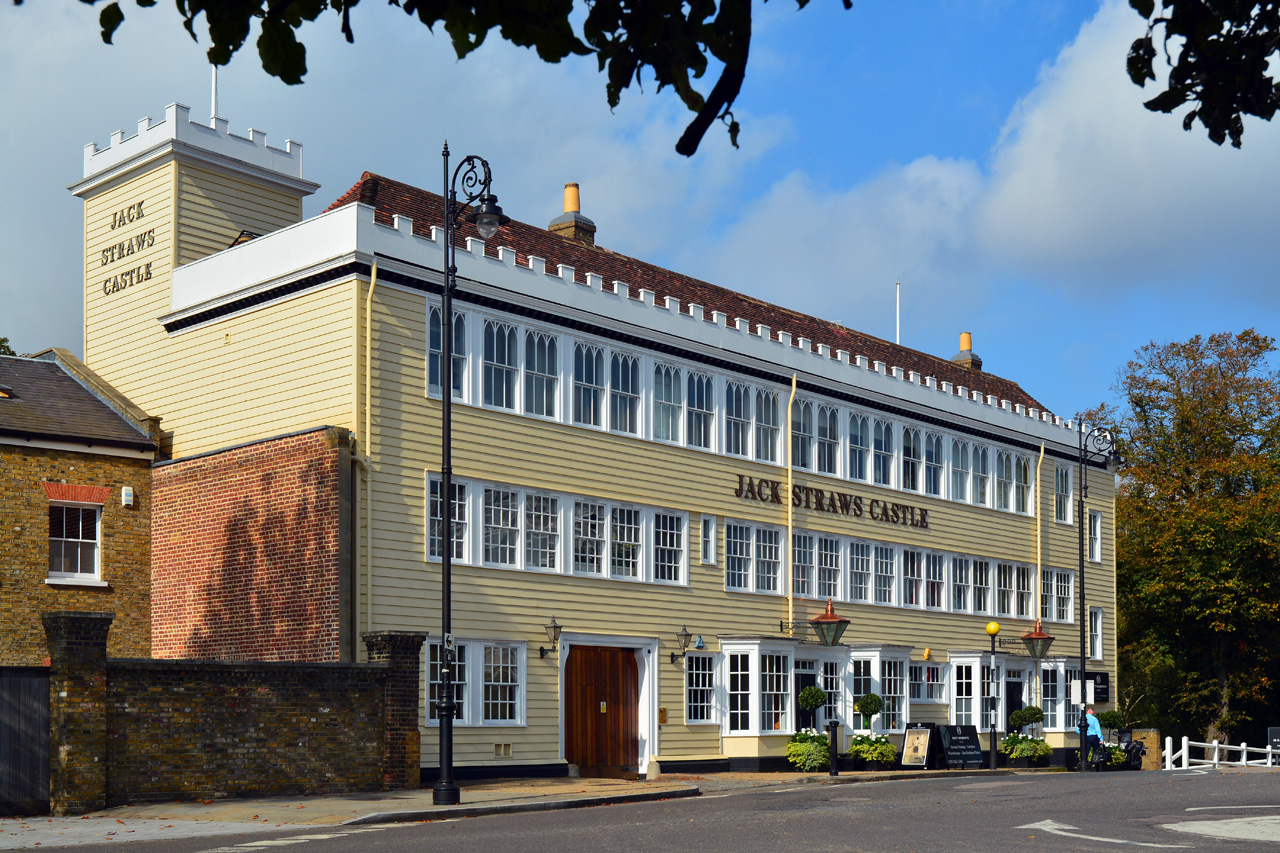
Jack Straw's Castle, Hampstead

Jack Straw's Castle is a Grade II listed building and former public house on North End Way, Hampstead, north-west London, England close to the junction with Heath Street and Spaniards Road.

The site is named after the rebel leader Jack Straw, who led the Peasants' Revolt in 1381 and who is said to have taken refuge on the site until he was caught and executed. A pub has existed here since at least the early 18th century. The building was altered in the early 19th century.

Charles Dickens was known to visit the pub, describing it as a place where he could get "a red-hot chop for dinner, and a glass of good wine". William Makepeace Thackeray and Wilkie Collins also visited it. It is mentioned in Bram Stoker’s Dracula, where Professor Van Helsing and Doctor Jack Seward stop to dine, and also in Harold Pinter's play No Man's Land.

It was the final residence of the music hall singer Alec Hurley, who died there in 1913. The building was badly damaged in The Blitz during World War II.

The current building was designed by the architect Raymond Erith and dates to 1964; speaking at Erith's memorial service in 1974, the poet laureate Sir John Betjeman called the building "true Middlesex" and "a delight". The pub closed in 2002, and was then converted to a number of luxury apartments and gymnasium. The ground and lower ground floors are now in use by Group Nexus.
