= Hampstead Way =

Street in London, England

Coordinates: 51.57760°N 0.19056°W

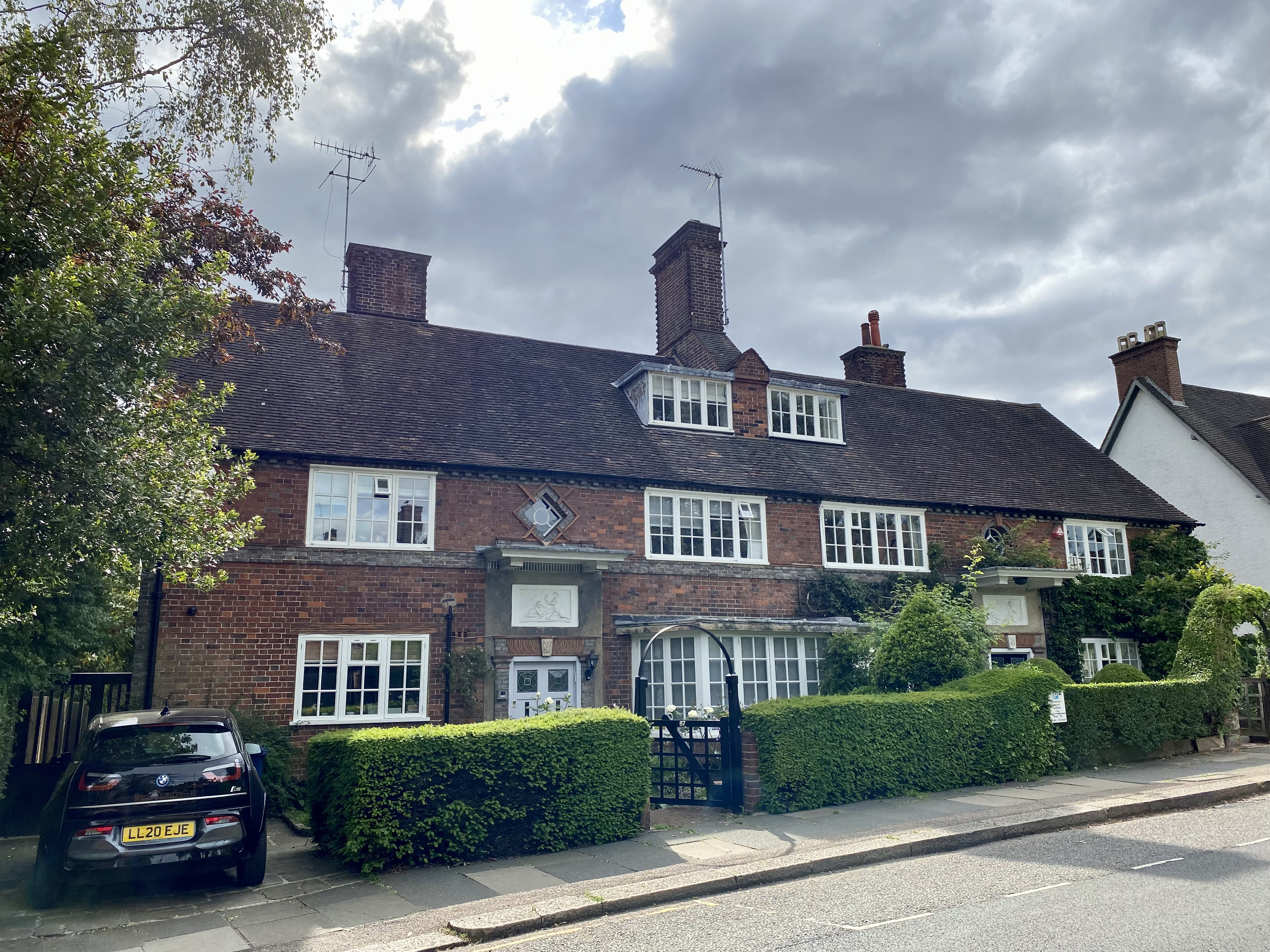
Characteristic houses of Hampstead Way.

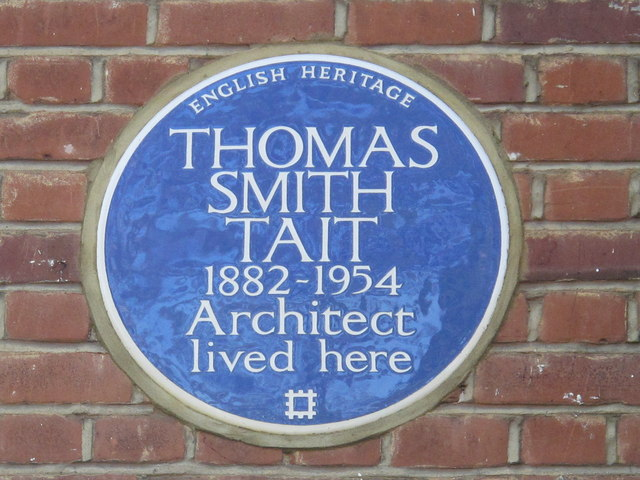
Blue plaque for the architect Thomas Smith Tait.

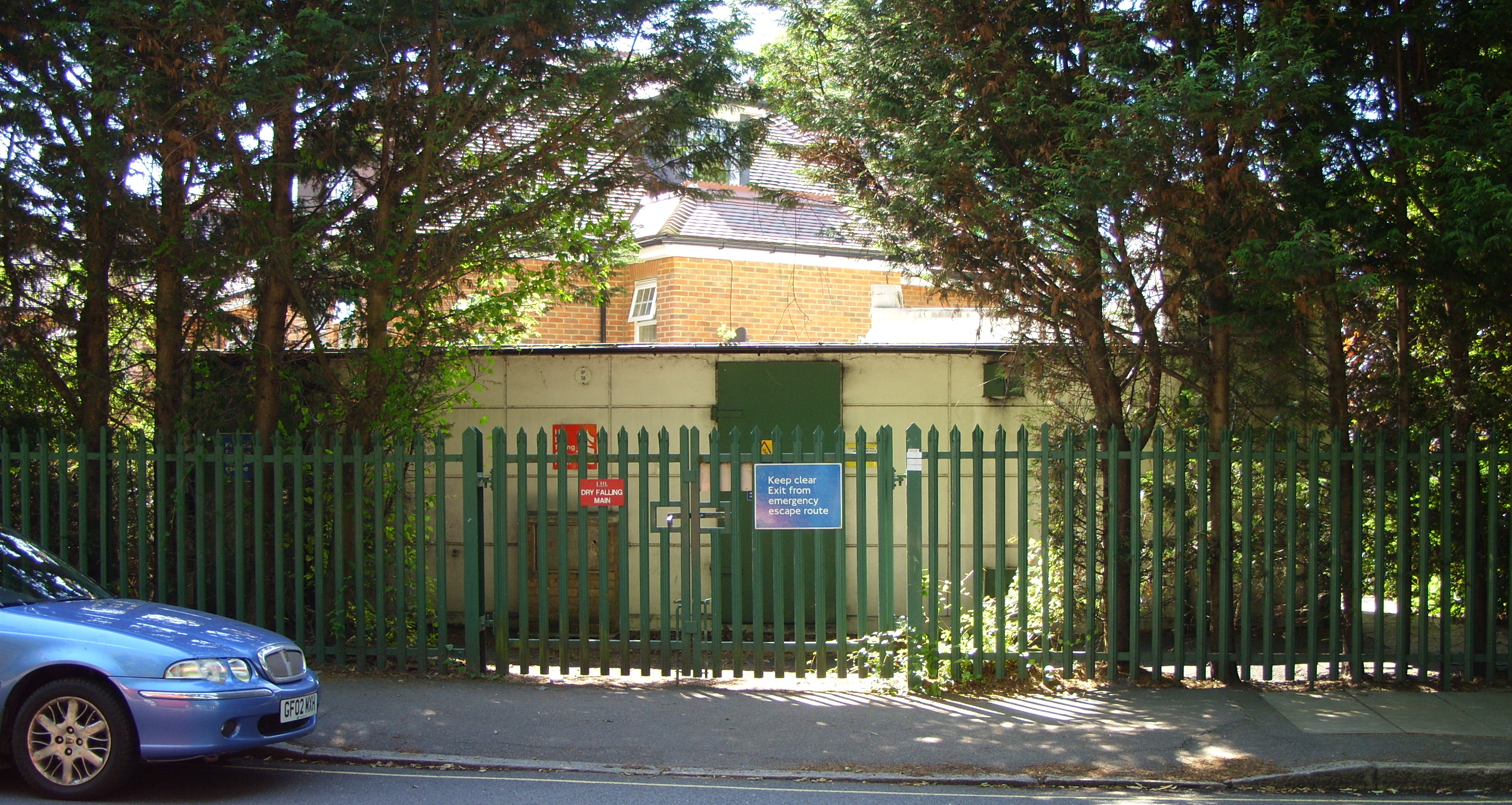
Surface access to the never-completed North End tube station on Hampstead Way.

Hampstead Way is a street at the northern edge of Hampstead. It is located primarily in the London Borough of Barnet although its southern end forms a border with the London Borough of Camden in which the rest of Hampstead is located. In the south it is part of the old hamlet of North End, which marked the northern boundary of Hampstead, but then curves northwards and follows the edge of Hampstead Heath into Golders Green and Hampstead Garden Suburb. The southern end leads off North End Way.

Notable residents on or near the street include Nikolaus Pevsner, the founder of the eponymous Architectural Guides who is commemorated with a blue plaque just off Hampstead Way at 2, Wildwood Terrace, William Blake and John Linnell who lived at Wyldes Farm and the architect Thomas Smith Tait on Hampstead Way itself.

North End tube station in the street was due to open on the Northern Line extension in the Edwardian Era, but it was abandoned uncompleted in 1906 when a planned housing development was instead turned into the Hampstead Heath Extension. A number of buildings in the street are now listed including Wyldes Farm (dating back until at least the seventeenth century) and the 1920s Heathcroft block of apartments.

== Bibliography ==
- Bebbington, Gillian. London Street Names. Batsford, 1972.
- Cherry, Bridget & Pevsner, Nikolaus. London 4: North. Yale University Press, 2002.
