= Golders Hill Park =

Park in Golders Green, London

Coordinates: 51.567°N 0.189°W

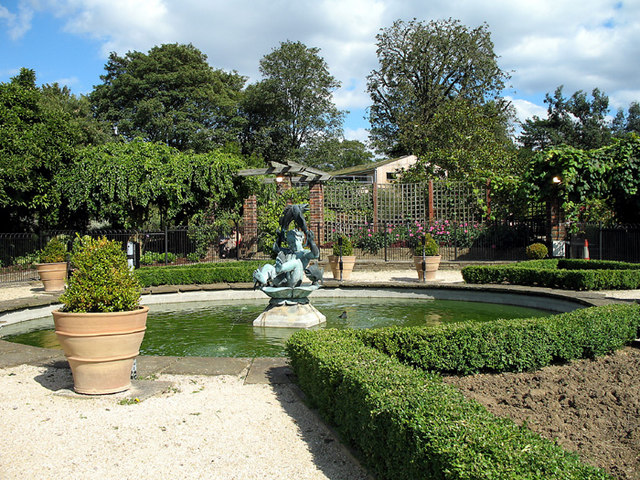
Golders Hill Park

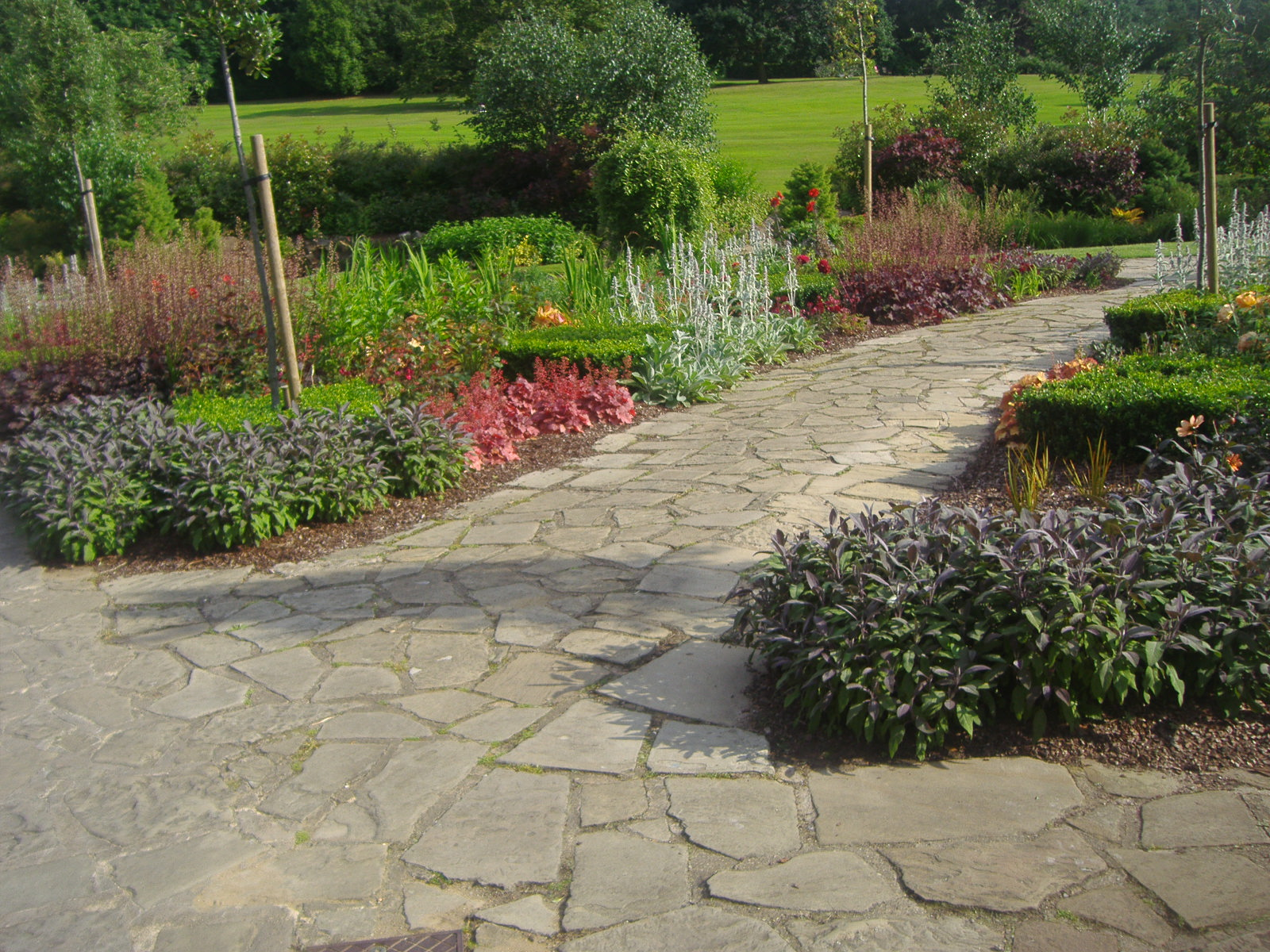
Path

Golders Hill Park is a formal park in Golders Green, London. It is managed by the City of London Corporation as part of the parkland and commons in and near Hampstead Heath, and is part of the Hampstead Heath Site of Metropolitan Importance for Nature Conservation. Unlike the rest of the Heath, Golders Hill Park is closed at night.

It adjoins the West Heath part of Hampstead Heath, and was formerly surmounted by a large house which was bombed during World War II. It is chiefly grassy parkland, but it also has a formal, beautifully tended, walled garden next to a duck pond with a small humpback bridge, a separate water garden, which leads onto a larger pond, and a small free zoo, with a separate pen primarily for fallow deer. There are also tennis courts, a playground, and croquet lawns. A café stands at the top of the park, near the site of the original house.

There is live music on the bandstand in the summer. Unlike most of Hampstead Heath, dogs must be kept on a lead in the park and are not allowed in certain areas.

== Species ==
The zoo contains a variety of animals and birds, including ring-tailed lemurs, Scottish wildcats, Bennet's wallabies, a Eurasian eagle-owl, kookaburras, fallow deer, donkeys, red junglefowl and bantam chickens.

== See also ==
- List of public art in Barnet
- Nature reserves in Barnet
- Barnet parks and open spaces
