= Victoria bus station =

Bus station in London, England

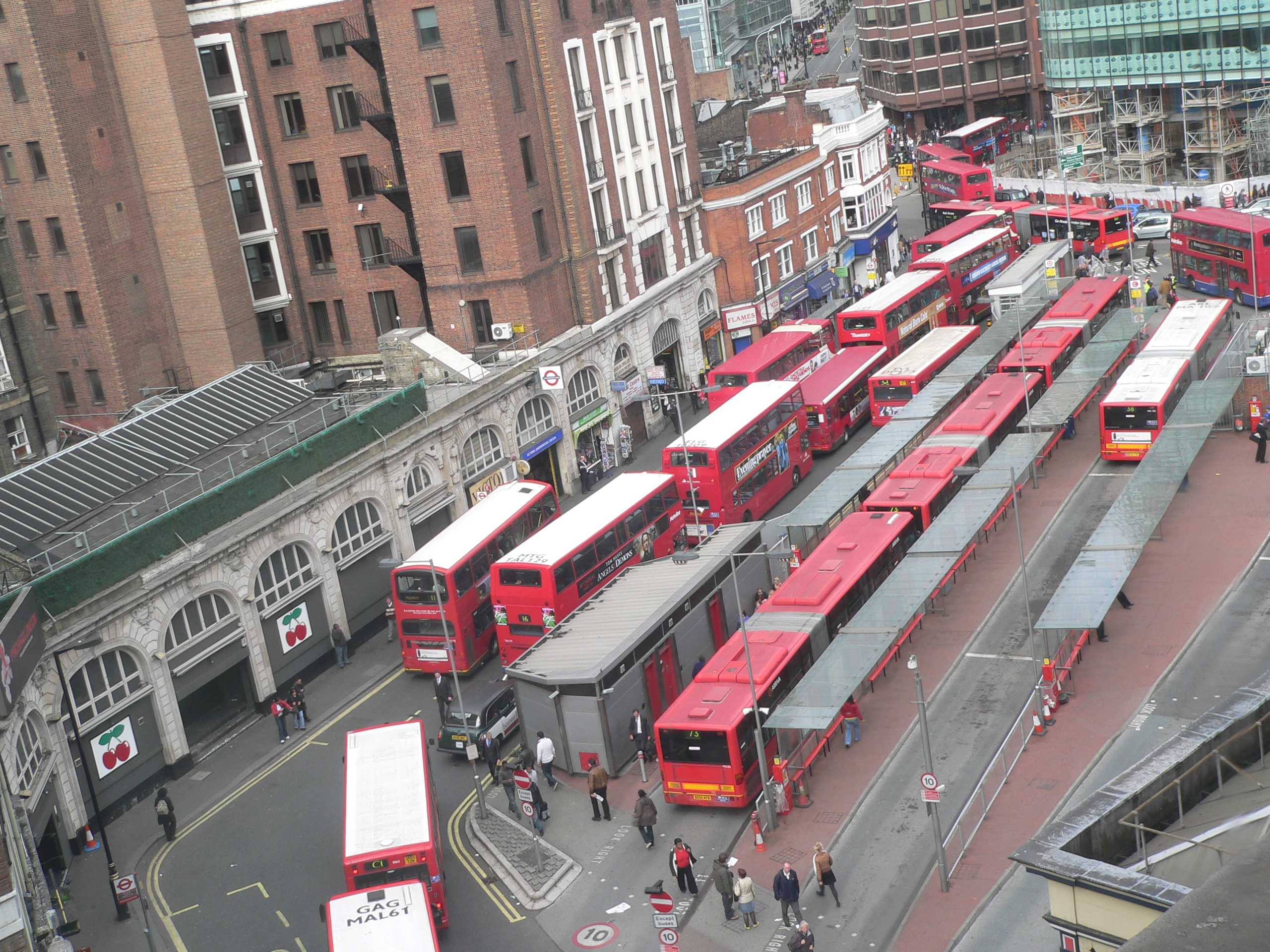
- The bus station in 2009

General information
- Location: Terminus Place, Victoria, London
- Coordinates: 51.4961°N 0.1440°W
- Operator: Transport for London
- Bus routes: 2, 3, 11, 19, 26, 36, 148, 185, 211, 390, N2, N38, N44, N136
- Bus stands: 4
- Bus operators: Arriva London; London Central; London General; London United; Metroline
- Connections: Victoria railway station Victoria tube station

Other information
- Website: www.tfl.gov.uk
Location
- Location within Central London

Victoria bus station is a bus station outside London Victoria station. It is managed only by Transport for London. In 1970, work commenced on a substantial roof canopy. This was demolished in April 2003 as part of the station's refurbishment.

Routes 3, 19, 52 and 390 terminate within the bus station while others pass through. Many other routes pass by on adjoining streets but do not enter the bus station.

In January 2020, Victoria BID – the local Business improvement district – proposed removing the bus station from the mainline station forecourt to create a new "Station Square". Bus stops would be relocated to nearby streets.
