= Fulham Broadway tube station =

London Underground station

Fulham Broadway
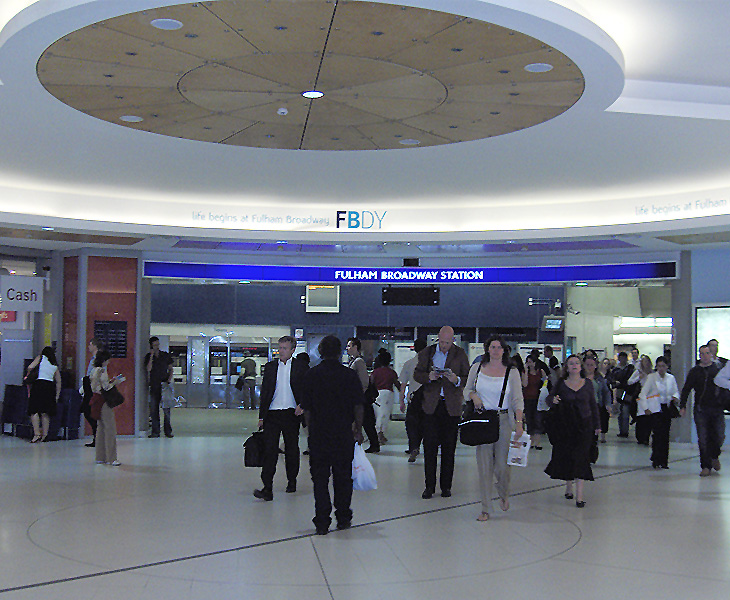
- Station entrance
- Interactive map of Fulham Broadway

General information
- Location: Walham Green
- Local authority: Hammersmith and Fulham
- Managed by: London Underground
- Number of platforms: 2
- Accessible: Yes
- Fare zone: 2

London Underground annual entry and exit
- 2021: ▲4.15 million
- 2022: ▲6.52 million
- 2023: ▲6.82 million
- 2024: ▼6.60 million
- 2025: ▲6.75 million

Railway companies
- Original company: District Railway

Key dates
- 1 March 1880: Opened as Walham Green
- 1 March 1952: Renamed Fulham Broadway

Other information
- External links: TfL station info page
- Coordinates: 51.4806194°N 0.1946556°W

Fulham Broadway (/ˈfʊləm ˈbrɔːdweɪ/) is a London Underground station. It is on the Wimbledon branch of the District line, between Parsons Green and West Brompton stations. It is in London fare zone 2. The station is located on Fulham Broadway (A304). It is the nearest station to Stamford Bridge stadium, the home of Chelsea Football Club. The station is in a cutting that was originally open air until it was covered by the 'Fulham Broadway Shopping Centre' development. The line then resurfaces shortly before West Brompton station.

== History ==
The station was opened as Walham Green on 1 March 1880 when the District Railway (DR, now the District line) extended its line south from West Brompton to Putney Bridge.

The original station building was replaced in 1905 with a new entrance designed by Harry W Ford to accommodate crowds for the newly built Stamford Bridge stadium. It is now a Grade II listed building.

The name was changed to its current form on 1 March 1952 after representations from Fulham Chamber of Commerce.

The station was upgraded in the early 2000s as part of the construction of the Fulham Broadway Shopping Centre over the station, with a new ticket hall, station control room and step free access. New "match day" staircases were added to the far end of the platform, allowing crowds attending Chelsea F.C. games easier entry/exit from the station, avoiding the main ticket hall and shopping centre. The upgraded station opened in 2003, with access via the shopping centre. The original street-level station building at the southern end of the platform was closed, with the original footbridge remaining in situ.

The original station building was then refurbished, with many of the original station signs and architectural features retained, including the historic terracotta block facade. The original station building has been used as a T.G.I. Friday's restaurant and a food hall, and was converted to a Wetherspoons pub in 2025.

On the night of 21 May 2008, the station was the scene of riots following Chelsea's defeat by Manchester United in the Champions League Final.

== Connections ==
London Buses routes 11, 14, 28, 211, 295, 306, 424 and night routes N11 and N28 serve the station.

| Preceding station | London Underground | Following station |
|---|---|---|
| Parsons Green towards Wimbledon | District line Wimbledon branch | West Brompton towards Edgware Road or Upminster |
