= Chelsea Fire Station =

Fire station in London, England

Coordinates: 51.48715°N 0.17029°W

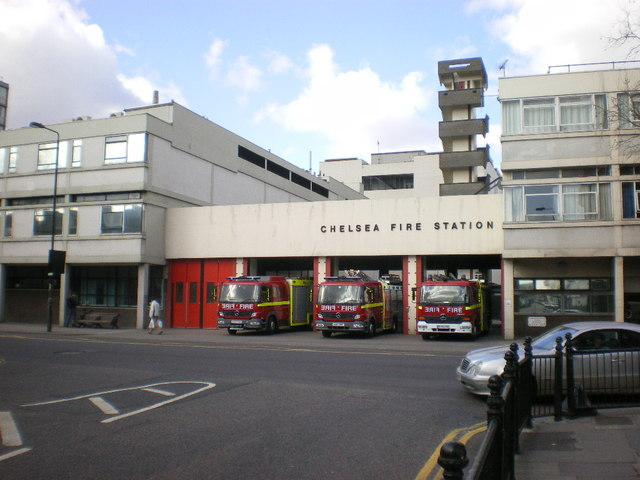
Chelsea Fire Station

Chelsea Fire Station is located at 264 King's Road, London.

The station was opened on 3 March 1965 as part of a wider scheme that included the Chelsea Arts School.

The station is one of the possible sites for Crossrail 2's King's Road Chelsea railway station.

In 2014, plans to reduce the number of engines located at the station were rejected.
