= London Buses route 3 =

London bus route

3
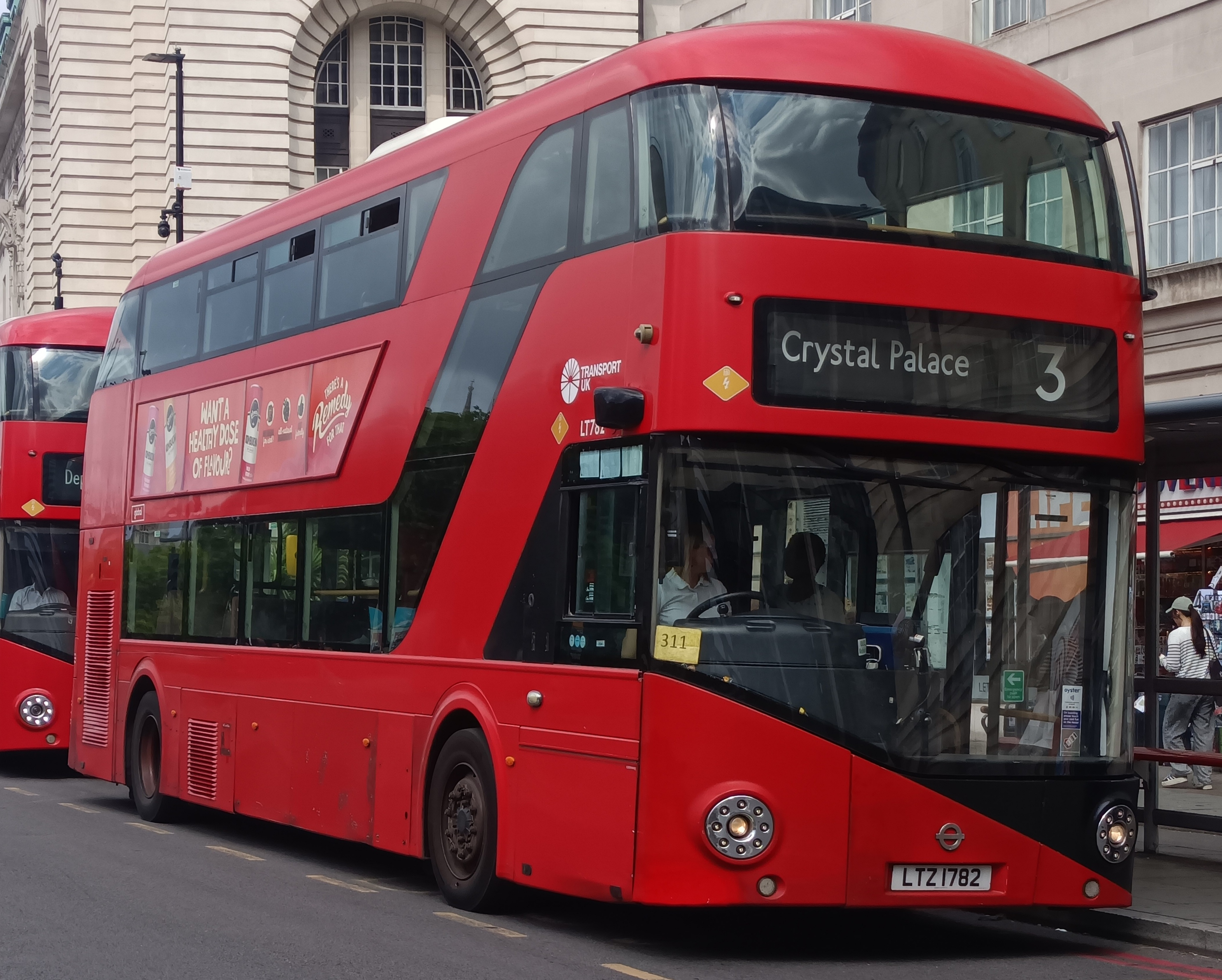
- Transport UK London Bus New Routemaster at St Thomas' Hospital in July 2025

Overview
- Operator: Transport UK London Bus
- Garage: Walworth
- Vehicle: New Routemaster
- Peak vehicle requirement: 17
- Night-time: N3

Route
- Start: Crystal Palace bus station
- Via: West Dulwich; Herne Hill; Brixton; Kennington; Lambeth
- End: Victoria bus station
- Length: 9 miles (14 km)

Service
- Level: Daily
- Frequency: About every 8-12 minutes
- Journey time: 43-90 minutes
- Operates: 05:55 until 00:45

London Buses route 3 is a Transport for London contracted bus route in London, England. Running between Crystal Palace and Victoria bus stations, it is operated by Transport UK London Bus.

== History ==
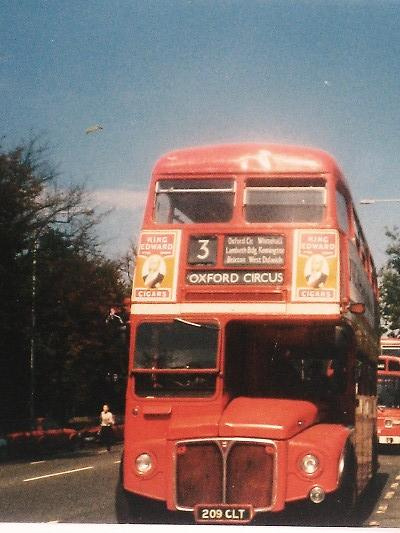
AEC Routemaster at Crystal Palace in August 1986

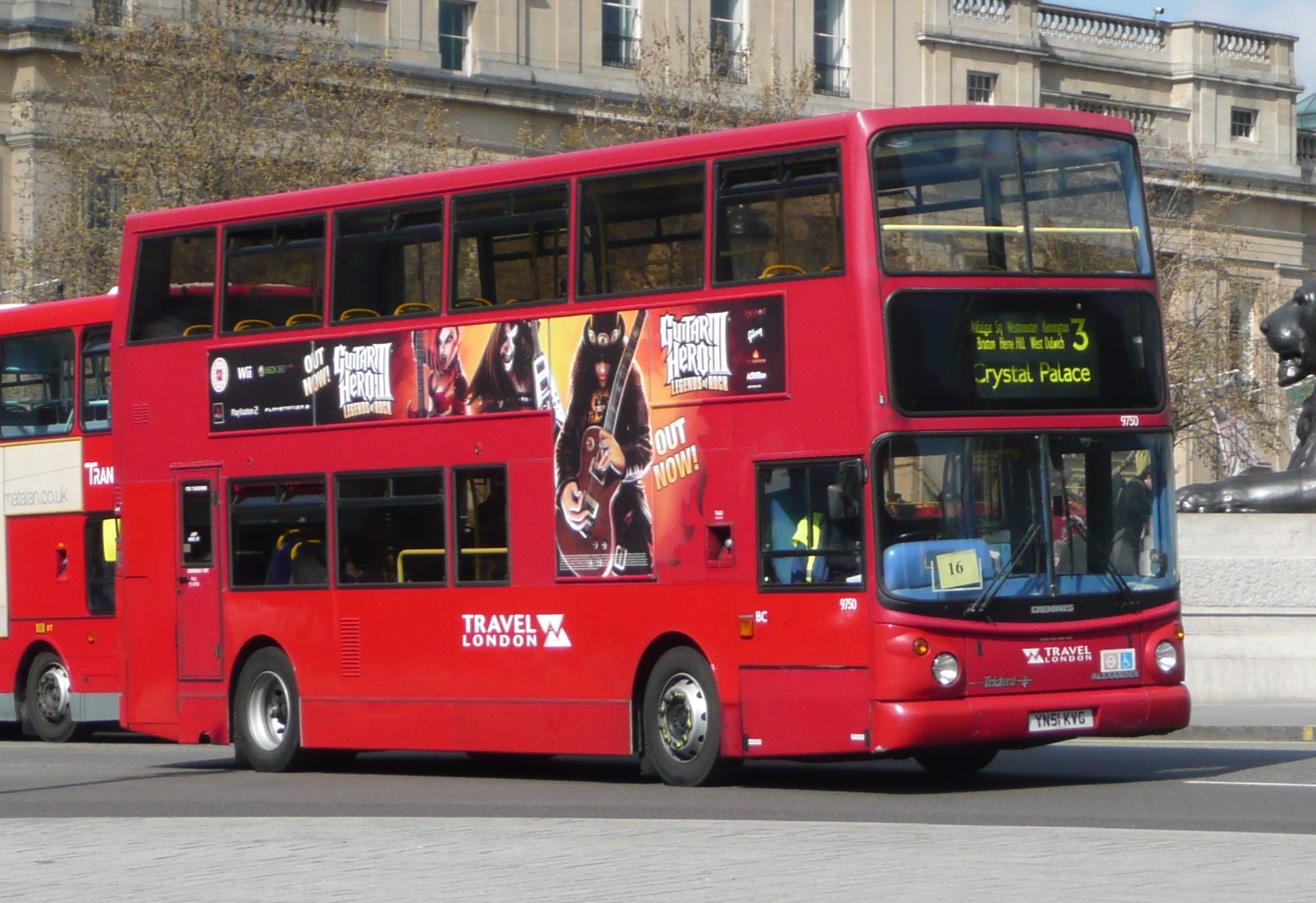
Travel London Alexander ALX400 bodied Dennis Trident 2 at Trafalgar Square in April 2008

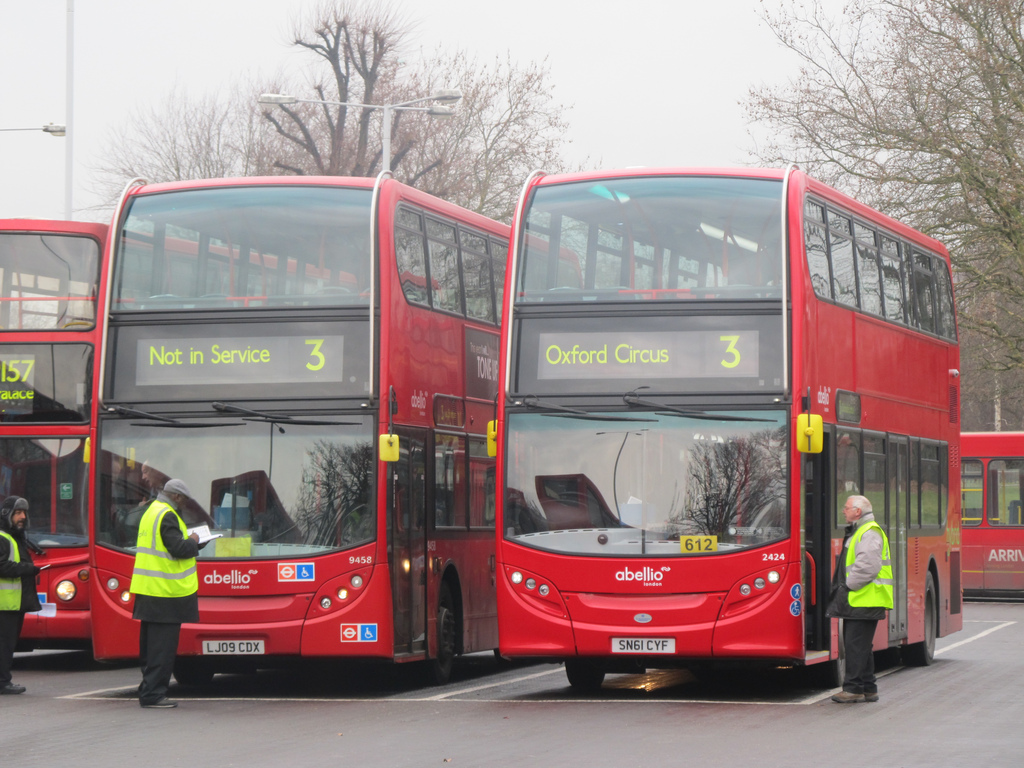
Abellio London Alexander Dennis Enviro400s at Crystal Palace in April 2014

Route 3 started operations on 1 November 1908 between Brixton station and South Croydon. On 19 November 1908, the route was altered at both ends to run between Oxford Circus and South Croydon. From April 1909 it was extended on Sundays to Purley, then to Whyteleafe in August 1909. A month later, route 3 was extended northwards to Camden Town, and was withdrawn between Streatham Common and Whyteleafe. On 3 March 1910, route 3 was withdrawn between Brixton (Lambeth Town Hall) and Streatham Common and re-routed via Effra Road to Brixton. In the same month the route was extended to Hampstead Heath. From 16 June 1912, route 3 became a Monday to Saturday route only, being replaced by the recently introduced 59 on Sundays.

On 11 May 1913, a new daily route 3A was introduced between Camden Town and Crystal Palace via route 3 to Brixton, then via Water Lane, Herne Hill, Croxted Road and South Croxted Road. Routes 3 and 3A only ran as such until 17 July 1913, when both routes became daily and exchanged numbers. At the outbreak of World War I in August 1914, the 3A was withdrawn as an economy measure, but was re-instated in October. Route 3 was extended from Crystal Palace to Upper Norwood a month later. By the end of hostilities route 3A had been withdrawn and route 3 ran between Camden Town to Crystal Palace.

On 1 December 1924, a new system of route numbering on London buses came into force under the London Traffic Act 1924. As a result, the short workings of route 3 from Camden Town to Brixton were renumbered 3A. This situation continued until 3 October 1934 when all 3A journeys were renumbered 3.

Just before the outbreak World War II, route 3 was replaced on Sundays by a new 3A route, running from Crystal Palace to Oxford Circus and on to Baker Street, Swiss Cottage, Hendon, Mill Hill and Edgware station. This was withdrawn after 15 October 1939 as a wartime economy measure. Route 3 returned to a 7-day operation and remained virtually unchanged for the next 40 years.

On 2 January 1993, it was converted to one man operation with the AEC Routemasters being replaced by 24 Optare Spectra bodied DAF DB250s until 1999, when upon being tendered, the contract to operate the route passed from London Central to Connex, who introduced Alexander ALX400 bodied Dennis Trident 2 low-floor vehicles.

Route 3 was included in the sale of Connex to Travel London in February 2004 which in turn was sold to Abellio London in May 2009. It is operated out of Battersea garage with a peak vehicle requirement of 22.

On 8 February 2016, New Routemasters were introduced on the route. On 15 July 2017, the route was withdrawn between Trafalgar Square and Oxford Circus. In June 2019, the route was further cut back to Whitehall.

On 23 November 2022, it was announced that a proposed rerouting of route 3 at Lambeth Bridge to serve Victoria instead of Whitehall would be going ahead following a consultation; it was implemented on 29 April 2023.

== Current route ==
Route 3 operates via these primary locations:

- Crystal Palace bus station
- Gipsy Hill
- West Dulwich station
- Herne Hill station
- Brixton station
- Brixton Road
- Kennington
- Lambeth Road
- Westminster
- Victoria bus station
  for Victoria station
