= Connex Bus UK =

Bus company operating services in Greater London

- Parent: Connex
- Founded: July 1999
- Defunct: February 2004
- Headquarters: Beddington
- Service area: Greater London
- Service type: Bus services

Connex Bus UK was a bus company operating services in Greater London. It was a subsidiary of Connex and operated services under contract to Transport for London.

== History ==
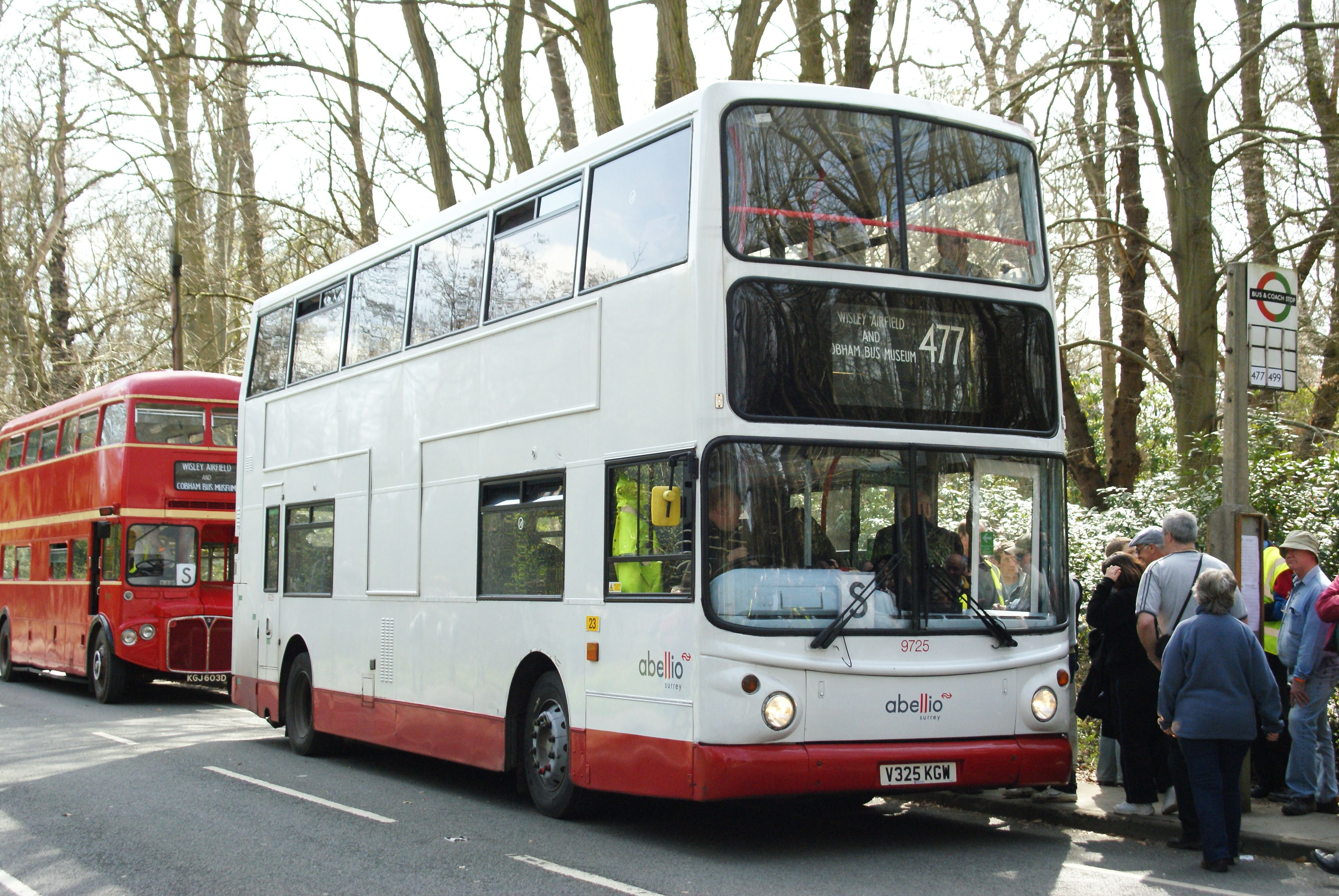
Alexander ALX400 bodied Dennis Trident 2 built for Connex for route 3 in January 2000

In 1999 Connex successfully secured the contract to operate route 3. It purchased a fleet of Alexander ALX400 bodied Dennis Trident 2s and established Beddington Cross garage. In 2001 it commenced operating routes 157 and 196.

In July 2001 Connex purchased the Limebourne business, which included a depot at Battersea and routes 156, 211, 344, C1 and C3.

Following their parent company losing its Connex South Central and Connex South Eastern rail franchises in 2001 and 2003, the latter for financial mismanagement, Connex decided to withdraw from the United Kingdom market. In February 2004 the business was sold to National Express and rebranded Travel London.
