= London Buses route 19 =

London bus route

19
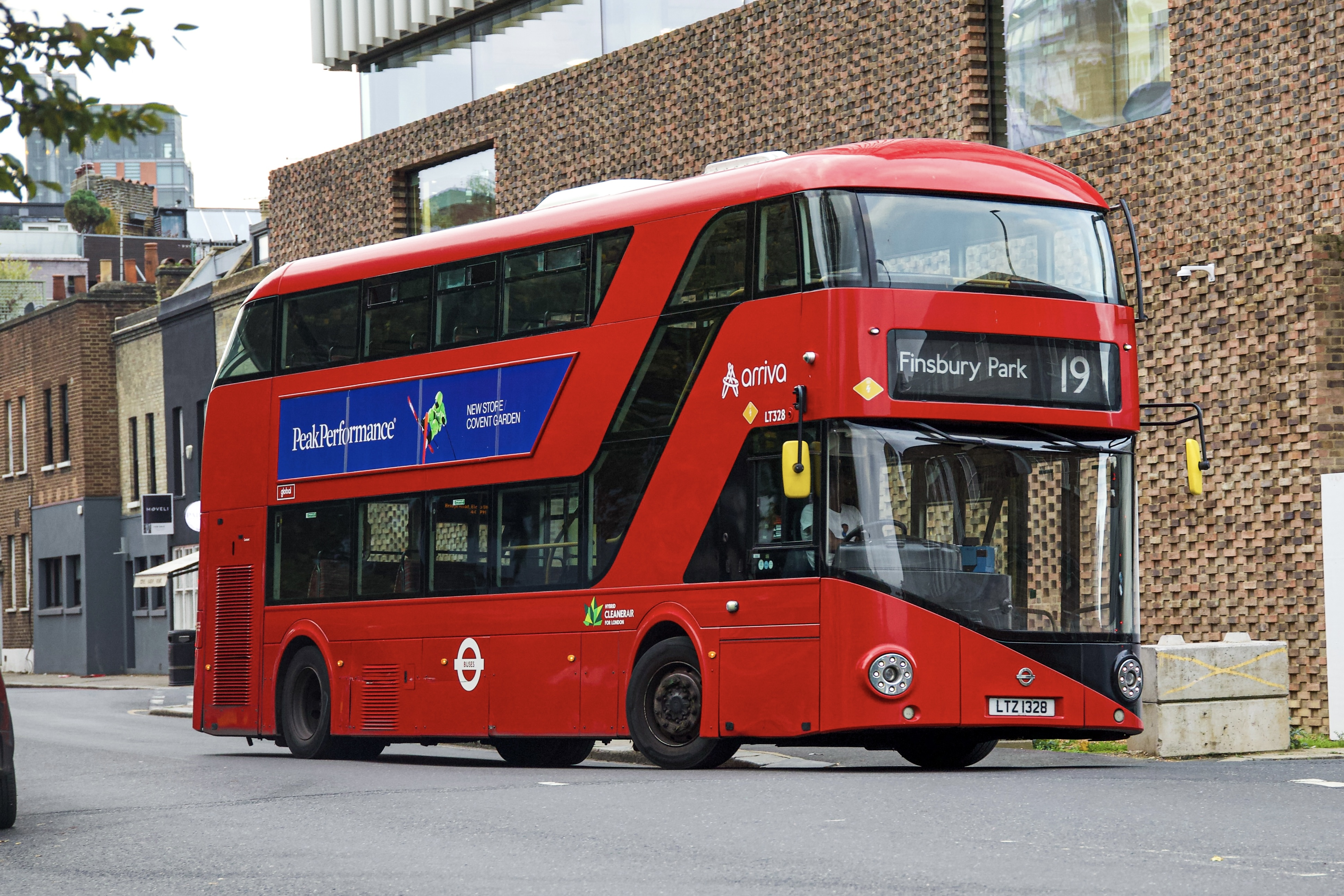
- Arriva London New Routemaster in Battersea in October 2024

Overview
- Operator: Arriva London
- Garage: Stamford Hill
- Vehicle: New Routemaster
- Peak vehicle requirement: 17
- Night-time: Night Bus N19

Route
- Start: Victoria bus station
- Via: Hyde Park Corner; Piccadilly Circus; Holborn; Highbury
- End: Finsbury Park bus station
- Length: 6 miles (9.7 km)

Service
- Level: Daily
- Frequency: Every 10 minutes
- Journey time: 34-70 minutes
- Operates: 05:30 until 01:00

London Buses route 19 is a Transport for London contracted bus route in London, England. Running between Victoria and Finsbury Park bus stations, it is operated by Arriva London.

== History ==
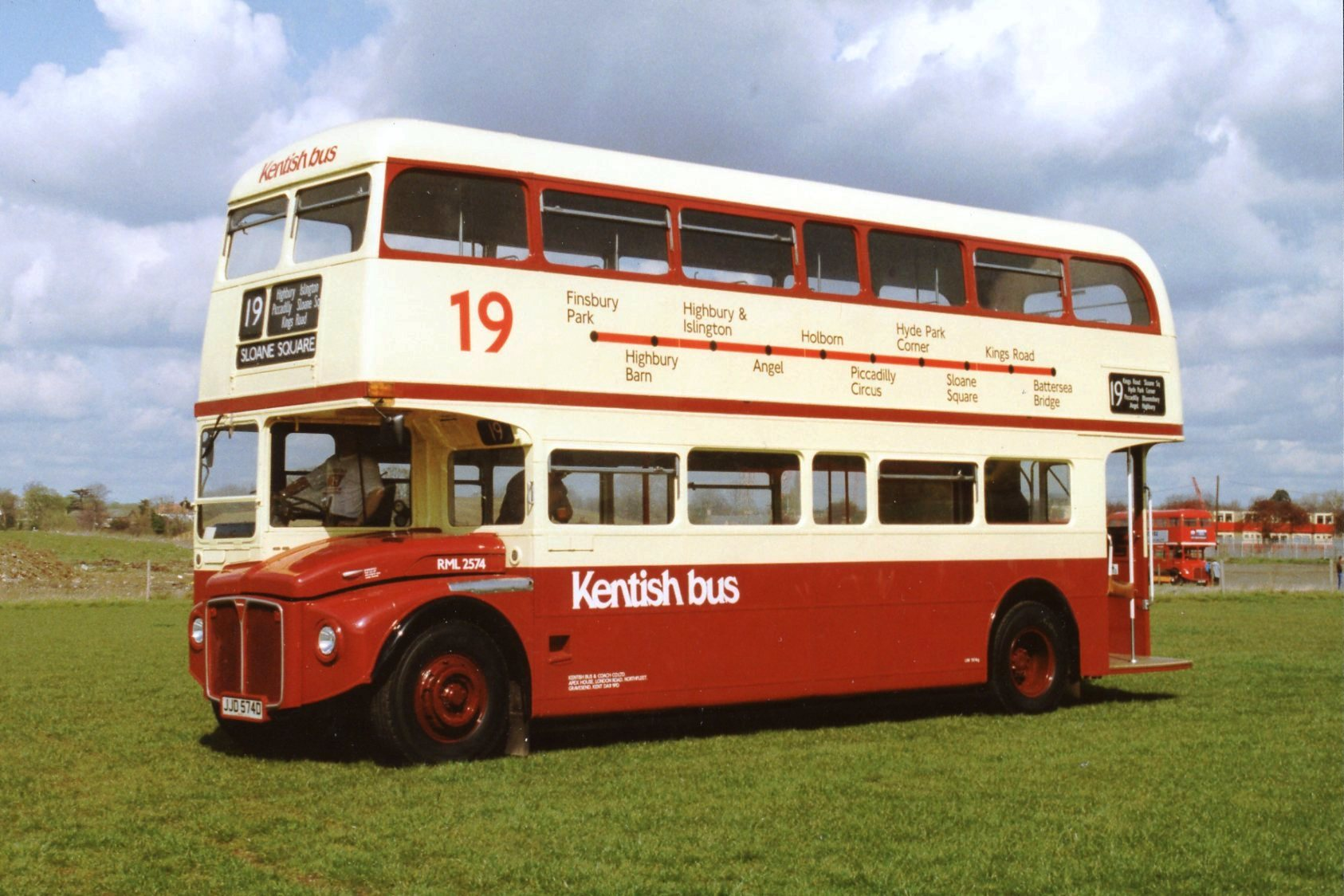
Kentish Bus AEC Routemaster in July 1993

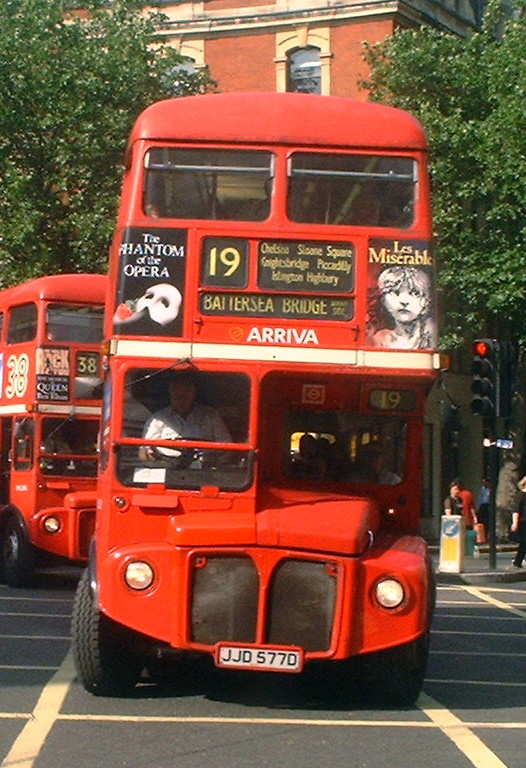
Arriva London AEC Routemaster at the intersection of Tottenham Court Road & Shaftesbury Avenue in August 2004

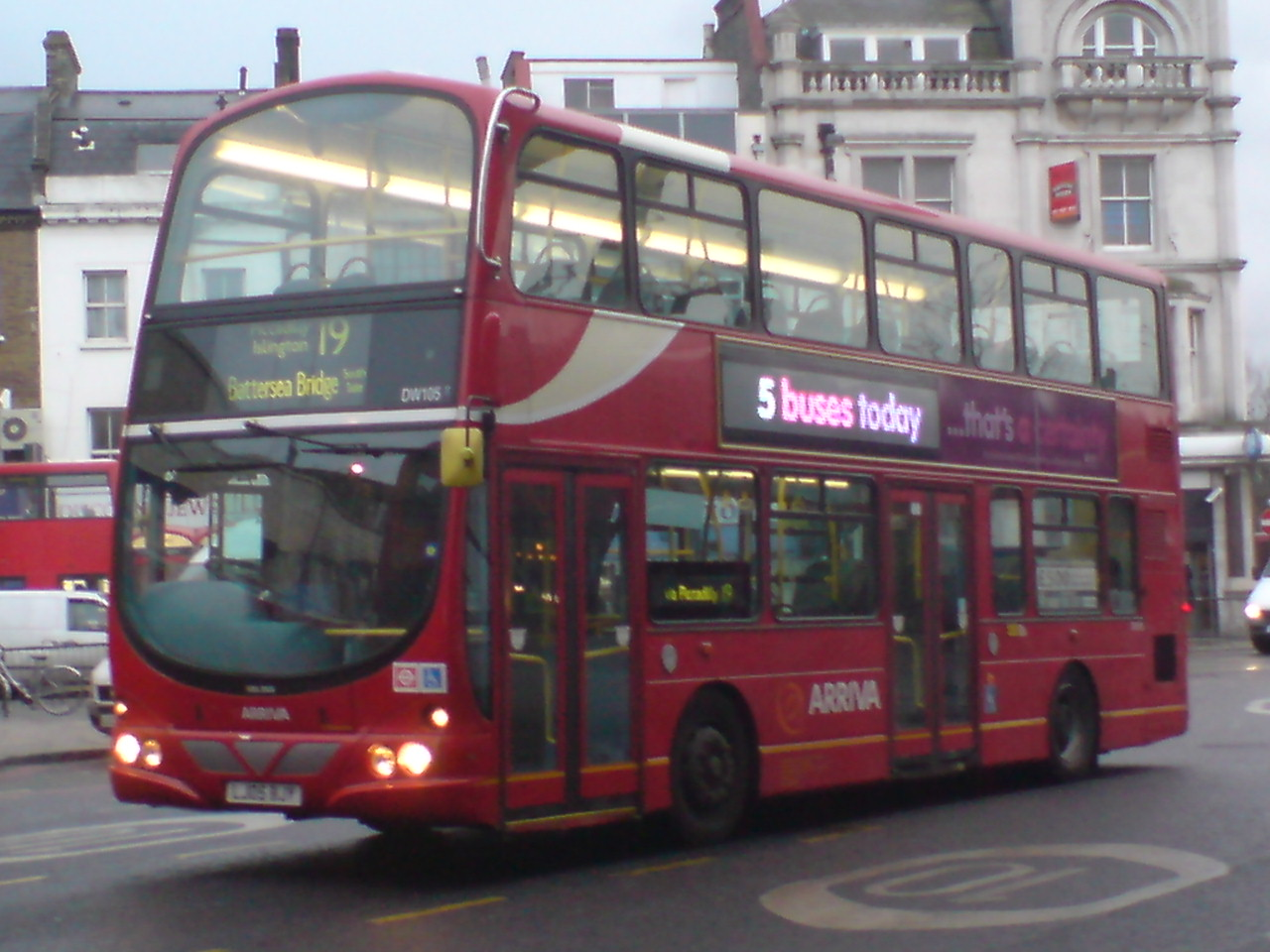
Arriva London Wright Pulsar Gemini bodied DAF DB250 at Finsbury Park bus station in February 2009

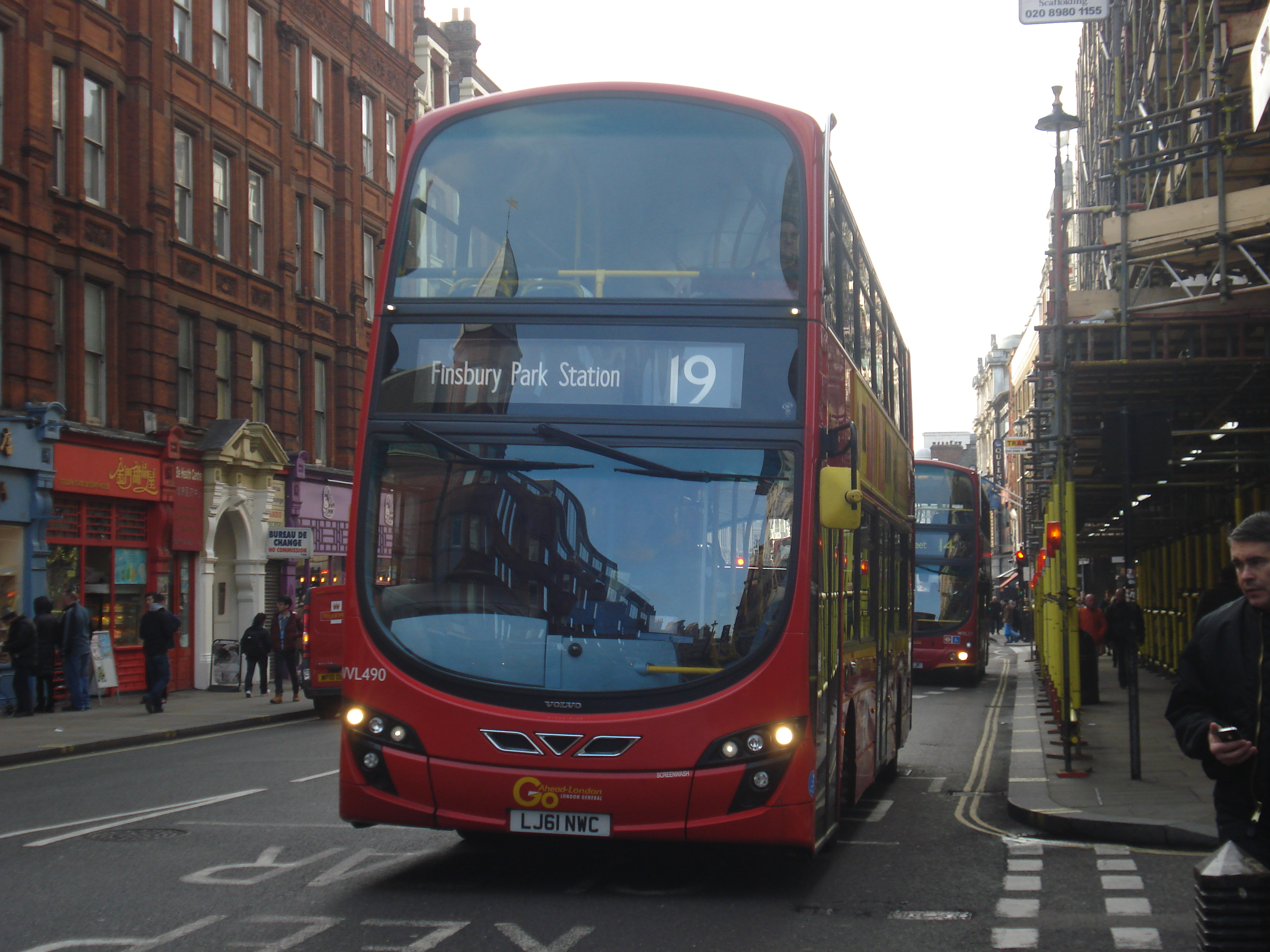
London General Wright Eclipse Gemini 2 bodied Volvo B9TL on Shaftesbury Avenue in December 2013

Route 19 began operating in 1906 between Highbury and Clapham Junction. In 1934, route 19 operated from Finsbury Park to Tooting Bec station with a Sundays only extension to Streatham Common. By 17 October 1956 the Sunday extension had been withdrawn between Streatham and Tooting, although it was reintroduced the following year on 1 May 1957 for a short period until its withdrawal on 16 October 1957.

On 23 January 1966, the route was once again given a Sunday extension, this time to Streatham Bus Garage and by 15 February 1969 the Sunday route was renumbered 19A, which was reverted to 19 by March 1971. The Sunday extension was finally withdrawn on 8 January 1972. Later that year, on 15 July, the Sunday service was cut back to Clapham Junction. During August 1972, the AEC Regent III RTs were replaced by AEC Routemasters. It was not until 5 October 1974 that the Sunday service reverted to Tooting Bec, following the withdrawal of route 19A. During 1975 garage journeys were extended to Tufnell Park, with the whole route being extended further to Archway by 1984. On 3 August 1985, the route was withdrawn between Finsbury Park and Archway.

On 24 April 1993, route 19 became the first Routemaster operated service to be awarded to a company that was not a subsidiary of London Buses Limited following the route being awarded to Kentish Bus after a competitive tender. Kentish Bus painted their Routemasters in a cream and maroon livery with route branding. Following nearly five years with Kentish Bus, operation transferred to Arriva London South in January 1998, with the Sunday service operated by sister Arriva company Grey-Green. A departure from the cream and maroon livery saw a return to the traditional London Bus red to comply with a contractual requirement for London buses to be 80% red.

A little over a year later, and after a period of 14 years, the Sunday allocation reverted to crew operation using Routemasters from Battersea. The Brixton allocation was retained for some early and late journeys run off the N19. In August 2002, in preparation for the introduction London congestion charge, the service was increased from 18 Routemasters to 26. The extra buses were released from route 13.

On 2 April 2005 the route was converted to one man operation with 28 new Wright Pulsar Gemini bodied DAF DB250LFs. Although Battersea was able to house all of the Routemasters needed to run the route, the newer and longer buses presented capacity problems, with six buses being outstationed at Norwood garage.

Upon being re-tendered, route 19 passed to London General’s Stockwell Garage on 31 March 2012 with new Wright Eclipse Gemini 2 bodied Volvo B5LHs and B9TLs.

On 28 March 2015, part of the route's allocation was transferred to Northumberland Park. Route 19 was one of the routes used to test automatic speed-limiting technology, beginning in July 2015.

Upon being re-tendered, the route was won by Arriva London who resumed operating it on 1 April 2017.

New Routemasters cascaded from route 48 were introduced on 12 March 2019.

In 2021, the peak service frequency was reduced from 7.5 buses per hour to 6.

Between 28 November 2025 and 23 January 2026, Transport for London proposed for route 19 to be withdrawn between Battersea Bridge and Hyde Park Corner, with it being extended to Victoria bus station to replace route 38 and to have its Saturday frequency increased from every 15 minutes to every 12 minutes. TfL then confirmed that they would proceed with the proposed changes; they were implemented on 14 November 2026.

== In popular culture ==
Route 19 has been mentioned at various points in popular culture. In Graham Greene's novel The Ministry of Fear (1943), which he classified as an "entertainment", the protagonist, Arthur Rowe, catches "a number 19 bus from Piccadilly" to Battersea in the London of the Blitz and observes how the bombs have struck some areas and spared others: "After the ruins of St James's Church, one passed at that early date into peaceful country. Knightsbridge and Sloane Street were not at war, but Chelsea was, and Battersea was in the front line"

Kate Millett writes in the first chapter 'Fugue state' in Flying (1974) of her journey through Chelsea and Soho riding in the top of the No. 19 bus, with two other mentions of it in the book;

"A cab to Victoria and then the bus, red and ominous as a city sandwich even though it’s for the airport. Riding upstairs I can smoke. There is someone on this bus who threatens me. We go through Chelsea. Lovely English houses, neat as springtime, flowers. Mssed it. Missed everything. Here five weeks, never went anywhere. Only the number 19 bus to Cambridge Circus past Soho porn houses, girl’s gray breast great calling from photo behind glass, fellow in a booth selling tickets. And the bookshops..."

The 1978 Dire Straits song Wild West End (about the London area of the same name) contains the line "And my conductress on the number 19...". The route is also referenced in the first line of Rudie Can't Fail by The Clash.

In the 1992 T.V. film "Mrs 'Arris goes to Paris", starring Angela Lansbury Omar Sharif and Diana Rigg, the number 19 bus is seen regularly as Mrs. Ada Harris's local service which she takes to work. The destination is shown as Victoria Station.

In November 2007, the route was featured in Vogue as "one of the 14 most stylish locations in Britain" The opening pages of Linda Grant's novel The Dark Circle (published in 2016) describe the hero, Lenny, riding on a 19 bus from Finsbury Park to Cambridge Circus in 1949. Along with the British Museum cafe and the bandstand in Battersea Park, the number 19 bus is one of the covert meeting places for the main characters in Good Omens.

Mention of the bus introduces the hero in one of John Gardner's Detective Sergeant Suzie Mountford novels The streets of town (2003);

"Another three minutes or so and Woman Detective Sergeant Suzie Mountford would not have been able to see Porky Pine from the top of her Number 19 bus as it came blustering down from Cambridge Circus as the day turned dark."

A bomb explosion on a number 19 bus, just outside Fortnum & Mason in Piccadilly, is the first of the terrorist acts depicted in the 2021 novel State of Terror by Hillary Rodham Clinton and Louise Penny.

== Current route ==
Route 19 operates via these primary locations:

- Victoria bus station for Victoria station
- Hyde Park Corner station
- Green Park station
- Piccadilly Circus
- Tottenham Court Road station
- Holborn Bloomsbury Square
- Clerkenwell
- Angel station
- Highbury & Islington station
- Finsbury Park bus station for Finsbury Park station
