= Euston St Pancras railway station =

Proposed station on Crossrail 2 in Central London

Euston St. Pancras
- Interactive map of Euston St. Pancras

General information
- Location: Somers Town
- Local authority: London Borough of Camden
- Owner: Transport for London or Network Rail
- Number of platforms: 2
- Fare zone: 1

Other information
- Coordinates: 51.529871°N 0.130716°W

Euston St Pancras railway station is a proposed station on the future Crossrail 2 line in the United Kingdom linking Hertfordshire and north-east London to south-west London and Surrey.

== Connections with surrounding stations ==
The station would be integrated into Euston and St. Pancras mainline stations, as well as Euston Underground station. Access to King's Cross station, and King's Cross St Pancras Underground station would be via a short walk through St. Pancras station. A link has been proposed to Euston Square station on the Underground, created as part of Euston's reconstruction for High Speed 2.

== Location ==
The platforms are proposed to be under Somers Town: from just south of the Eversholt Street and Drummond Crescent junction in the west, to just north of the British Library at Ossulston Street in the east. Entrances to the station are proposed to be the existing entrance to Euston Underground station, and new entrances at the corner of Eversholt Street and Grafton Place, and inside St Pancras station, by the Thameslink platforms.

== Construction ==
Worksites proposed in the 2015 consultation were:

- north of Grafton Place (including the Travelodge)
- between Doric Way and Drummond Crescent on the east side of Eversholt Street
- between the British Library and Crick Institute
- Euston Square Gardens.

Future development
Preceding station	Crossrail	Following station
Tottenham Court Road towards Hampton Court, Shepperton, Chessington South or Epsom	Crossrail 2	Angel towards New Southgate or Broxbourne
