= Crossrail 2 =

Proposed railway in London, England

Overview
- Status: Proposed, consultation and design paused since 2020
- Owner: Transport for London; Network Rail
- Stations: 47
- Website: crossrail2.co.uk

Service
- Type: Commuter/suburban rail Rapid transit
- System: National Rail

Technical
- Num of tracks: 2
- Track gauge: 1,435 mm (4 ft 8 1/2 in) standard gauge
Route map
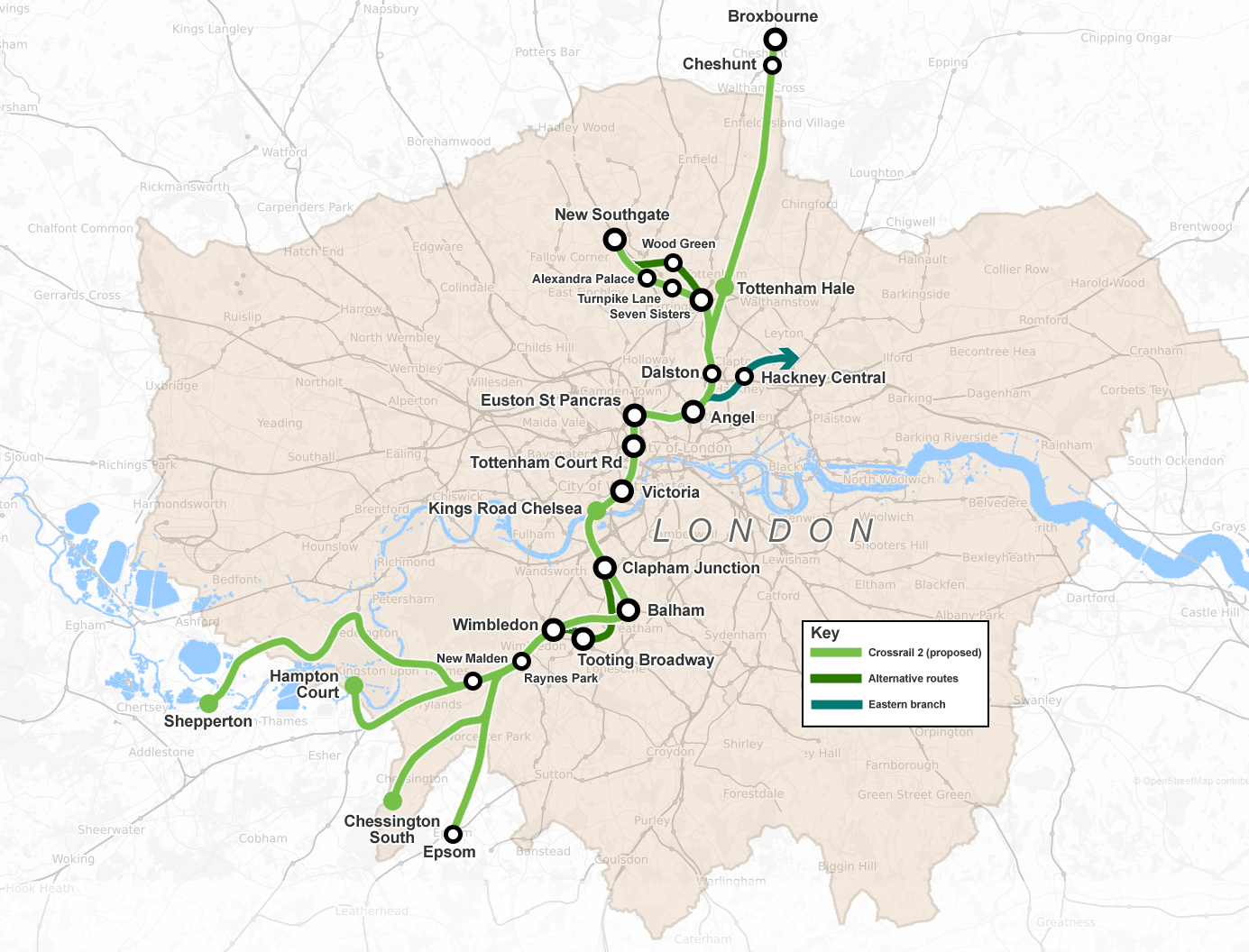

Crossrail 2 is a suspended proposal for a hybrid commuter rail and rapid transit route in South East England, running from nine stations in Surrey to three in Hertfordshire, providing a new north–south rail link across Greater London. It would connect the South West Main Line to the West Anglia Main Line, via Victoria and King's Cross St Pancras. The intent was to alleviate severe overcrowding that would otherwise occur on commuter rail routes into Central London. When first proposed, the hope was for construction to start around 2023, with the new line opening from the early 2030s. The project's cost has been estimated (in 2017) at £31.2 billion.

The line would have been the fourth major rail project in the capital since 2000 (East London line extensions opened in May 2010, the Thameslink Programme opened in 2018 and Crossrail opened in May 2022). National Rail's projections of overcrowding, including in suburbs and tourist destinations less well-served by the Underground, led it to call for more new lines and cross-London line proposals gained more importance with Euston being named as the terminus of the planned High Speed 2 rail line.

The scheme was shelved as part of the conditions for emergency COVID-19 funding worth £1.8 billion between the government and Transport for London (TfL) announced on 1 November 2020.

The project was earlier known as the Chelsea–Hackney line (or Chelney line) in reference to a potential route. The plan for a line on this alignment has existed in various forms since 1970, initially as an Underground service and later as a standard railway.

== 2015 plans ==
This route is from the 2015 public consultation.

=== Core section ===
Operating in new tunnels at 30 trains per hour (in each direction):

- Dalston (Dalston Junction–Dalston Kingsland) Double-ended station
- Angel
- Euston St. Pancras (High Speed 1, High Speed 2, East Coast Main Line, Midland Main Line, West Coast Main Line, Thameslink)
  double-ended station serving Euston, King's Cross and St Pancras mainline stations and the Underground's Euston, Euston Square and King's Cross St Pancras stations
- Tottenham Court Road (Crossrail Elizabeth line)
- Victoria (Brighton Main Line, Chatham Main Line)
- King's Road Chelsea – the only entirely new station site
- Clapham Junction (SWML, Brighton Main Line, Waterloo–Reading line)
- Tooting Broadway or Balham
- Wimbledon (South West Main Line, Sutton Loop Line (Thameslink)

Also in new tunnels, connected to a junction north of Dalston, at 10 and 15 trains per hour:

- Seven Sisters-South Tottenham double-ended station
- either Turnpike Lane and Alexandra Palace (Thameslink, Northern City Line, Hertford Loop Line) or Wood Green
- New Southgate having surfaced, continuing to Oakleigh Road depot.

=== Northern Regional section ===
Running at between 10 and 15 trains per hour on new rails above ground, connected to a junction north of Dalston:

Tottenham Hale (West Anglia Main Line, Lea Valley lines) all stations to Broxbourne for Crossrail 2 services and Cheshunt.

=== Potential eastern extension ===
The 2015 consultation earmarks a "potential future Eastern Branch"

- Hackney Central/Hackney Downs (Lea Valley lines)

=== South West section ===
Above ground, after surfacing south of Wimbledon station, using the existing SWML slow line, and providing between 4 and 20 trains per hour, the southern section comprises:

- 20 trains per hour at Raynes Park
- 8–10 trains per hour at Motspur Park
- Exclusive use of the Chessington branch line to Chessington South at 4 trains per hour
- Mixed (shared) use of the Raynes Park – Epsom line to Epsom (Sutton and Mole Valley lines) (4–6 trains per hour)
- 10–12 trains per hour at New Malden
- Exclusive use of the Hampton Court branch line to Hampton Court at 4 trains per hour via shared station Surbiton
- Shared use of the bulk of the Kingston Loop Line via Kingston at 6–8 trains per hour to Teddington and 4 trains per hour onward to Shepperton

== Transport for London consultations ==
=== 2013 consultation ===
In May 2013, TfL began public consultation on two potential options:

- Metro route: Wimbledon – Central London – Angel – Alexandra Palace (all underground)
- Regional route: Twickenham/Surbiton/Epsom – Wimbledon – Central London – Angel – Alexandra Palace (underground) plus Angel – Cheshunt.

The results of the consultation were published on 29 November 2013 by TfL and revealed broad support for the Crossrail 2 plans. 96% of respondents supported or strongly supported the plans, whilst 2% opposed or strongly opposed them. The regional route had greater support than the metro route, with 84% of respondents supporting or strongly supporting the regional route versus 73% for the metro plans.

The greatest level of opposition to the principle of Crossrail 2 came from the residents of Kensington and Chelsea, the only area with more than 5% of respondents (16%) who strongly opposed the scheme. Nearly 20% of respondents from this area either opposed or strongly opposed the scheme; the corresponding percentages in all other areas did not exceed 10%.

=== 2014 consultation ===
In June 2014, a consultation began on small modifications to the 2013 proposals. The changes proposed fell broadly into three areas: extending the Alexandra Palace branch to New Southgate; relocation or removal of the Chelsea station; and moving the point at which the two northern branches diverged to beyond either Dalston Junction or Hackney Downs station, calling at only one of these two stations.

=== 2015 consultation ===
A further consultation began in October 2015. In October 2015, the route proposal was changed in three ways:

- Balham was to be the preferred stop instead of the nearby alternative of Tooting Broadway. This would give a further railway interchange
- Not to serve the remainder of the Kingston Loop Line (Strawberry Hill and Twickenham).
- A (pink-coloured) option bypassing Turnpike Lane and Alexandra Palace and instead going via Wood Green to support "Haringey's aspiration for the redevelopment of Wood Green High Road... situated in the main retail area of Wood Green with access to shops, leisure and services".

In January 2016, Surrey County Council published a detailed report lobbying for TfL to consider extending branches to Dorking and Woking.

== Cost and funding ==
The cost of the scheme has been estimated at £27–32 billion, in 2014 prices including the cost of new trains and Network Rail works. However Transport for London (TfL) argued the full cost of the project could be £45 billion in 2017. To ease the funding issues TfL recommended spreading the funding over a longer period and completing the project by the 2040s, ten years after the initial projection.

In the 2016 Budget, the Treasury gave the green light for the project, and allocated £80 million towards developing the project, with the aim of bringing forward a Hybrid Bill "this Parliament", meaning before 2020.

In the 2017 Autumn Budget, the Treasury said only that it will "continue to work with Transport for London on developing fair and affordable plans for Crossrail 2, including through an independent review of funding and financing". On 2 March 2018, the UK's Transport Secretary, who represents a seat centred on a prospective terminus of one of the branch lines (Epsom and Ewell), announced Mike Gerrard would lead the Treasury's required Independent Affordability Review, which is expected to conclude in the summer of 2018.

The mayor of London intends to charge Mayoral Community Infrastructure Levy in the same manner as for the original Crossrail project.

The funding plan for building Crossrail 2 was postponed as part of the £1.8 billion COVID-19 pandemic financial recovery plan agreed by the government and TfL, which also required the option for driverless Crossrail 2 trains to be further investigated. Most consultancy work will be brought to an orderly end, though land for the project will be safeguarded.

== History ==
A south-west/north-east tube line was originally planned as early as 1901 and a Bill was put before Parliament in 1904. However, political manoeuvring by rival tube magnate Charles Yerkes ended the proposal.

=== 1970s ===
A south-west to north-east tube line was proposed in 1970 by the London Transport Board's London Rail Study as the next project after the completion of the Victoria line and the Fleet line (now the Jubilee line). Designed to relieve pressure on the District, Central and Victoria lines and to link two areas without tube services, the route would have taken over the Wimbledon branch of the District as far as Parsons Green, then followed a new underground alignment via Aldwych (where it would take over the then Piccadilly line shuttle to Holborn); thence to Leytonstone, and continuing over one of the branches of the Central line. For financial reasons the line was not built, but the idea has remained.

=== 1980s ===
Following the Central London Rail Study of 1989, a route through central London was safeguarded. As the route would serve both King's Cross and King's Road it was suggested that it could be named Kings line. It was decided, however, that the Jubilee line extension should take priority and the project was postponed.

=== 1990s ===
In 1995, an alternative Express Metro plan was put forward that would utilise more existing track, have fewer stations and be built to National Rail standards. It would take one of three routes from East Putney on the District line to Victoria; either Putney Bridge, Parsons Green and Chelsea or King's Road as in the original safeguarded plan; or to Wandsworth Town and Clapham Junction and then via Chelsea Harbour and King's Road or via Battersea. From Hackney Central it would split into two branches, to Leytonstone and then on to Epping taking over the Central line; and taking over the North London Line to Woolwich, a route now followed by the Docklands Light Railway.

The 1991 safeguarding also included a spur south of Victoria across the river to Battersea Park, for stabling trains and to access a riverside tunnelling site.

=== 2000s ===
The London East West Study in 2000 considered Crossrail, the Chelsea–Hackney line and a combination of the two, from Wimbledon to Tottenham Court Road and then to Liverpool Street. The Study supposes main-line gauge, and would omit a station at Piccadilly Circus. Its version of the Chelsea-Hackney Regional Metro splits in the north, with one branch via Dalston taking over the Epping branch of the Central line, the other to Finsbury Park, then using the disused alignment of the Northern Heights plan, taking over the High Barnet branch of the Northern line. The Express Metro option would run on the East Coast Main Line.

Crossrail was given the go-ahead in 2007 in preference to the Chelsea–Hackney line, despite some commentators favouring the latter putting implementation after Crossrail's completion date of 2018. The Chelsea–Hackney plans were taken over by Crossrail as Crossrail 2.

In 2007, the 1991 route was updated – Sloane Square was dropped and the Central line's Epping branch from Leytonstone was re-safeguarded. Due to objections from residents of Sloane Square, it was reinstated the following year. South West Trains' Wimbledon depot was safeguarded as a depot for the line. The safeguarding was enlarged from tube gauge to Network Rail loading gauge as it became clear that larger and longer trains would be needed. Of the three routes proposed for south-west London the Royal Borough of Kensington and Chelsea initially favoured one going south via Imperial Wharf to Clapham Junction, but now supports the takeover of the District line's Wimbledon branch. Under these present plans, only one entirely new station would be constructed, at Chelsea.

=== 2010s ===
==== 2008 safeguarded route ====
A route for the line was safeguarded (legally protected from conflicting development) in 2008. It linked the District line's Wimbledon branch with the Central line's Epping branch via Parsons Green, Chelsea, Sloane Square, Victoria, Piccadilly Circus, Tottenham Court Road, King's Cross St Pancras, Angel, Essex Road, Dalston Junction, Hackney Central, Homerton and Leytonstone. The safeguarding also includes a spur from Victoria under the Thames to Battersea Park for stabling and access to a tunnelling site. The safeguarded route was reviewed by the Department for Transport in 2013.

==== Northern and southern destinations ====
Network Rail's July 2011 route utilisation strategy (RUS) for London and the South East supports the existing safeguarded route but speculates about possible modifications in addition to re-routing via Euston. To the south, it suggests that the tunnels should go from Victoria via Clapham Junction to beyond Wimbledon, instead of surfacing near Parsons Green and taking over the District line from there to Wimbledon. To the north, it suggests that the West Anglia corridor would be a better destination than a branch of the Central line. These suggestions are driven by what the RUS sees as the need for extra capacity on the South West Main Line and the West Anglia corridor. With the planned terminus of HS2 at Euston, Chelsea–Hackney was put back to the top of the agenda for new lines, diverted via Euston.

The London and South East second generation RUS by Network Rail proposed some changes to the safeguarded route: serving Clapham Junction rather than the Wimbledon branch of the District line, not serving Sloane Square, and serving Euston as well as King's Cross St Pancras. The RUS was also open to changes north of Hackney Central and branches south of Clapham Junction, both of which were seen as later phases.

TfL responded by releasing its preferred options – an automatic metro and a regional scheme:

In July 2015, Surrey County Council commissioned a study to propose in detail and with cost-benefits analysed proposals, services from Surbiton as far as the main line stop of Woking (and whether or not to serve directly the four main intervening stations). Options explored were the re-routing trains so as not to terminate at Waterloo and creative timetabling plans to add capacity to the South West Main Line such as the option of moving trains onto the lighter-used New Guildford Line which runs between Surbiton and Guildford, looking at more semi-fast stopping patterns enabled as well once the Waterloo bottleneck is lifted.

Automatic Metro
- Wimbledon
- Tooting Broadway
- Clapham Junction
- King's Road Chelsea
- Victoria
- Piccadilly Circus
- Tottenham Court Road
- Euston St Pancras double-ended station serving both main-line stations as well as King's Cross main-line station and Euston and King's Cross St Pancras Underground stations
- Angel
- Essex Road
- Dalston Junction
- Hackney Central
- Seven Sisters
Regional Option
- Commencing at Twickenham, Shepperton, Woking, Chessington South and Epsom (take over or share South West Trains routes)
- Wimbledon
- Tooting Broadway
- Clapham Junction
- King's Road Chelsea
- Victoria
- Tottenham Court Road
- Euston St. Pancras double-ended station serving both main-line stations as well as King's Cross main-line station and Euston and King's Cross St Pancras Underground stations
- Angel splits into two branches
- Dalston Junction // *Hackney Downs / Hackney Central double-ended station
- Seven Sisters // *Tottenham Hale
- Wood Green // *Cheshunt
- Alexandra Palace Terminates // Continuing to Hertford East (take over or share the Great Eastern branch)

Both TfL routes at both ends of the route serve Clapham Junction to a higher level than relieving the District line, and the Victoria line at its northern end, and the Central line. The regional option relieves the South West Main Line, and congested sections of the Northern line and Piccadilly line, by creating alternative routes for journeys from outside Zones 1 and 2.

In February 2013, business group London First's Crossrail taskforce, chaired by former Secretary of State for Transport Andrew Adonis published its recommendations for Crossrail 2, favouring the regional option. Later the same day, Network Rail endorsed the plans.

On 5 February 2015 Dr Michèle Dix was appointed managing director of Crossrail 2.

Proposed changes from previous plans were:
- Services west of Surbiton would go to Hampton Court instead of Woking
- Chelsea station would be called "King's Road Chelsea"
- The double-ended station "Euston King's Cross St. Pancras" would serve Euston as well as King's Cross and St. Pancras
- Turnpike Lane would be served instead of Wood Green
- The other branch from Angel would serve Hackney, Tottenham Hale and Cheshunt.

In March 2016, the National Infrastructure Commission said that Crossrail 2 should be taken forward "as a priority" and recommended that a bill should pass through Parliament by 2019 with the line opening by 2033.

=== 2020s ===
While the project remains shelved, in 2025 the British Library confirmed that its extension work, due to commence in 2026, would include provision in its infrastructure for a possible future Crossrail 2 station.

== Support and opposition ==
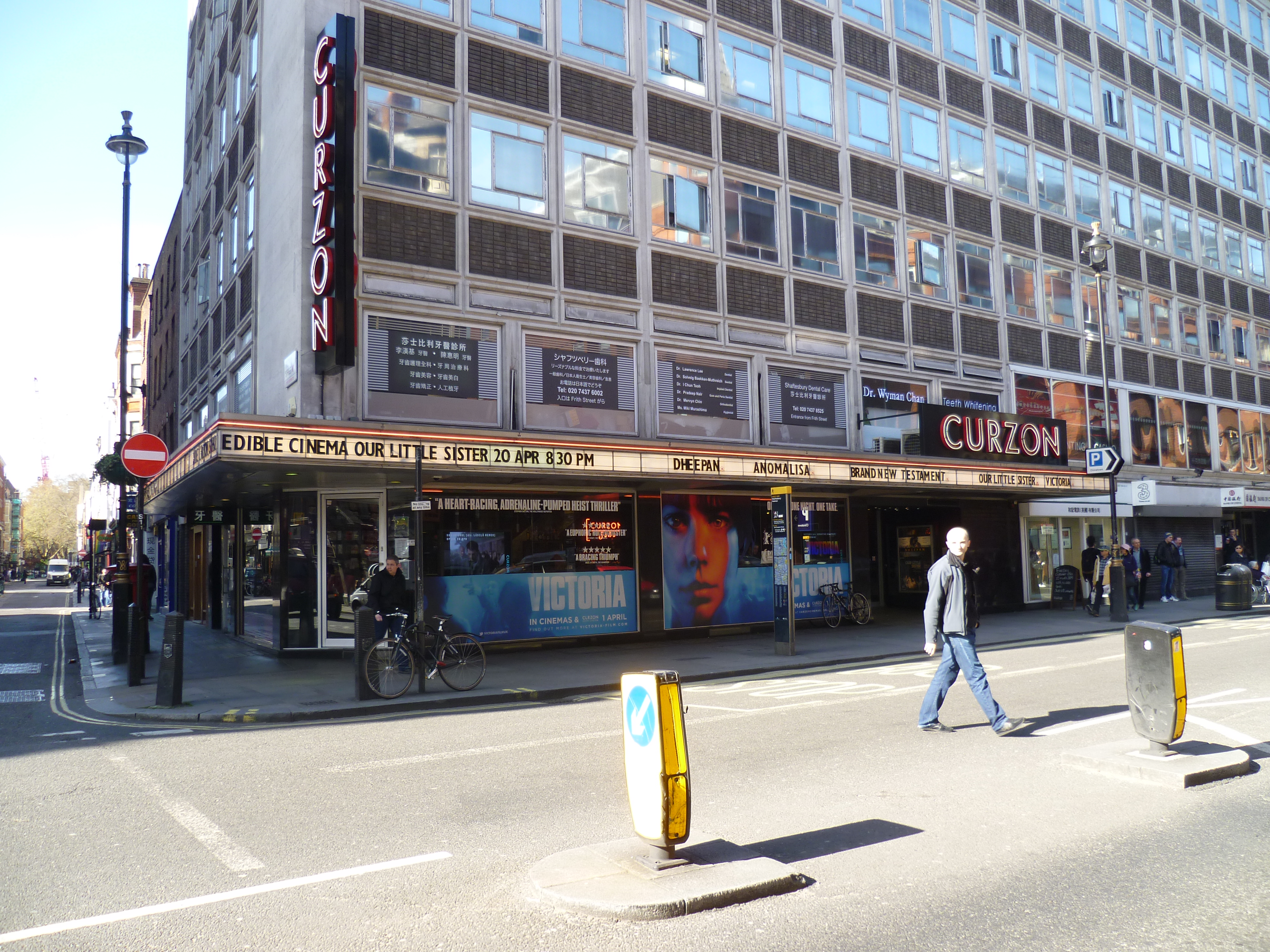
Curzon Soho

=== Support ===
Boris Johnson, Mayor of London in 2013, said at that time: "The key question now is not whether Crossrail 2 should happen, but how quickly we can get it built". Johnson, as Prime Minister, restated his backing for the project at an event to mark the opening of the Elizabeth line in May 2022.

The current mayor of London, Sadiq Khan, also supports the proposal, as does the former Secretary of State for Transport Chris Grayling.

Many local authorities in South East England and London released a letter on 13 April 2017, expressing their support for Crossrail 2. ITV news reported in April 2017 that "dozens of MPs" supported Crossrail 2.

After TfL conducted a public consultation in 2017, it was reported by the Fitzrovia Partnership that 96% of respondents supported Crossrail 2 and 80% of respondents preferred the broader of the two options, the Regional option.

The London Chamber of Commerce announced its support in July 2017 with the Greater Manchester Chamber of Commerce announcing support for Crossrail 2 in September 2017.

During the Elizabeth line opening ceremony in May 2022, Boris Johnson said that "the government should be 'getting on with' building Crossrail 2"; however, he also clarified that the business case will need to be written and put forward by Transport for London.

=== Opposition ===
In 2014, Transport for London announced that the site of the Curzon art-house cinema in Soho had been identified as an area that "may be required to enable the construction of a Crossrail 2 ticket hall" and that "plans for the above site redevelopment may include a replacement cinema". In 2015, the chairman of the "Save Soho" campaign group called the development "deeply worrying".

The plans for Wimbledon station involve the redevelopment of parts of Wimbledon town centre, including the Centre Court shopping centre. Merton Council issued a seven-page cross-party objection to the plans.

There was only a short interval between the announcements of the confirmation of continued government support for Crossrail 2 in 2017, and of the scaling back of proposed railway electrification projects which would particularly benefit Wales and Northern England. Greater Manchester mayor Andy Burnham considered that the in-principle spending decision gives undue and unbalanced priority to London and South East England over other parts of the United Kingdom.

== Naming ==
In the 2000s, the project became "Crossrail 2" in light of the east–west Crossrail project. In 2014, Mayor of London Boris Johnson called for the future line to be called the "Churchill line", after Winston Churchill.

== See also ==
- The Fifteen Billion Pound Railway - a documentary about the Elizabeth line's construction and commissioning
