= Euston tube station =

London Underground station

Euston
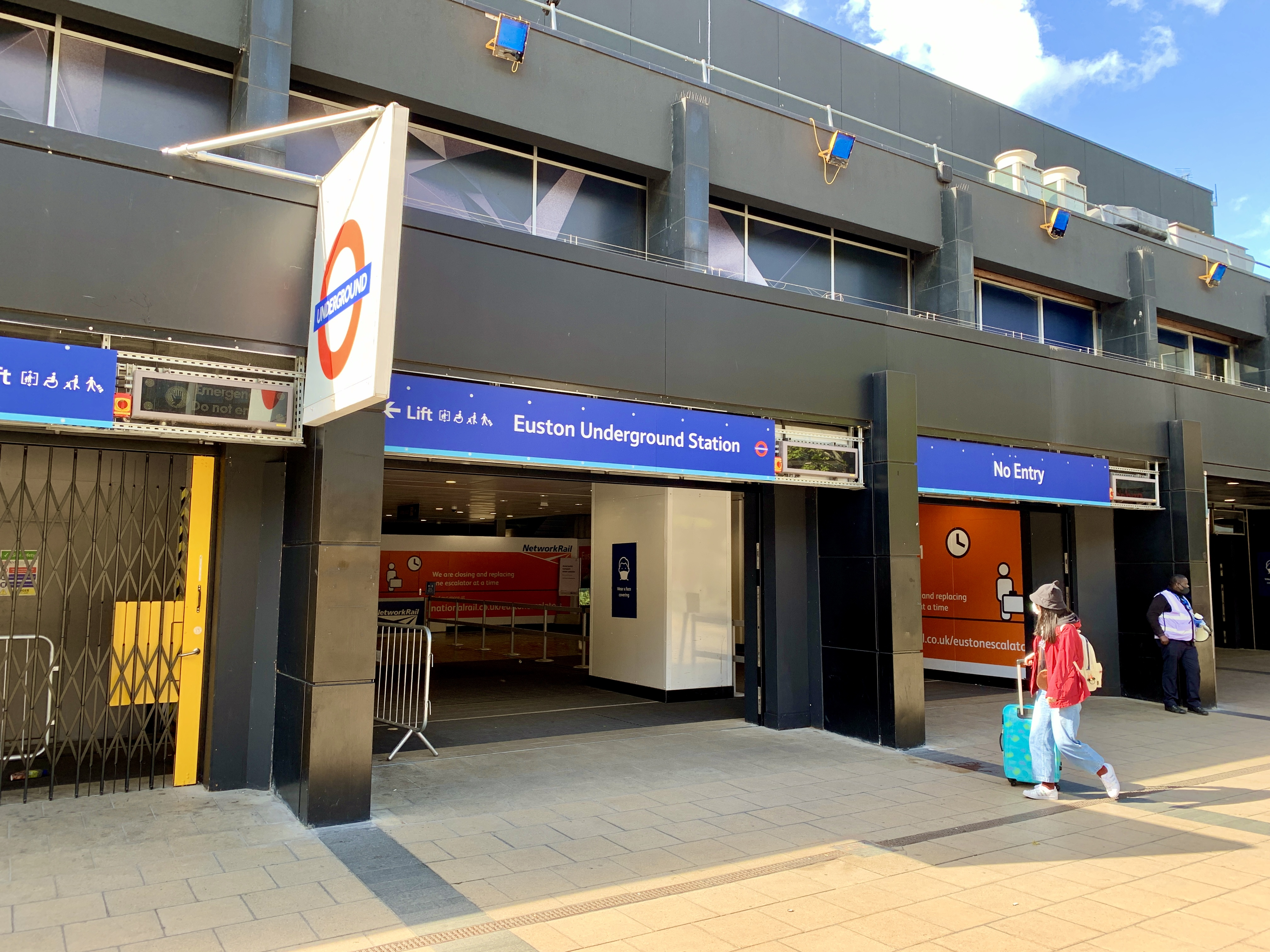
- Entrance to the Underground station within the main line station
- Interactive map of Euston

General information
- Location: Euston Road
- Local authority: London Borough of Camden
- Managed by: London Underground
- Number of platforms: 6
- Fare zone: 1
- OSI: Euston; Euston Square

London Underground annual entry and exit
- 2020: ▼8.79 million
- 2021: ▲15.88 million
- 2022: ▲27.69 million
- 2023: ▲29.97 million
- 2024: ▲33.80 million

Key dates
- 12 May 1907: Opened (C&SLR)
- 22 June 1907: Opened (CCE&HR)
- 8 August 1922: Closed for rebuilding (C&SLR)
- 20 April 1924: Reopened (C&SLR)
- 1 December 1968: Opened (Victoria line)

Other information
- External links: TfL station info page
- Coordinates: 51.5284°N 0.1331°W

Euston (/ˈjuːstən/) is a London Underground station. It directly connects with its National Rail railway station above it. The station is in London fare zone 1.

Euston was initially constructed as two separate underground stations. Three of the four Northern line platforms date from the station's opening in 1907. The fourth Northern line platform and the two Victoria line platforms were constructed in the 1960s when the station was significantly altered to accommodate the Victoria line. Plans for High Speed 2 and Crossrail 2 both include proposals to modify the station to provide interchanges with the new services.

The station serves two branches of the Northern line and the Victoria line. On the Northern line's Bank branch, the station is between Camden Town and King's Cross St Pancras stations. On the line's Charing Cross branch, it is between Mornington Crescent and Warren Street stations. On the Victoria line, it is between Warren Street and King's Cross St. Pancras stations. The station is near Euston Square tube station, allowing connections at street level to the Circle, Hammersmith & City and Metropolitan lines.

== History ==
=== Northern line ===
==== Planning ====
An underground station to serve Euston station was first proposed by the Hampstead, St Pancras & Charing Cross Railway in 1891. (Note: The Metropolitan Railway's original underground line, opened in 1863, had a station at the junction of Euston Road and Gower Street, but this is approximately 250 metres (820 ft) south-west of the main line station. Originally, named "Gower Street", the station was renamed "Euston Square" in 1909.) The company planned a route to run from Heath Street in Hampstead to Strand in Charing Cross with a branch diverging from the main route to run under Drummond Street to serve Euston, St Pancras and King's Cross stations. Following parliamentary review of the proposals and a change in name to the Charing Cross, Euston and Hampstead Railway (CCE&HR), permission was granted for the route in 1893, although the branch line was only permitted as far as Euston.

For the remainder of the 1890s, the CCE&HR struggled unsuccessfully to raise the necessary capital to fund construction of the new line. Whilst doing so it continued to develop its route proposals. In 1899, parliamentary permission was obtained to modify the route so that the Euston branch was extended northwards to connect to the main route at the south end of Camden High Street. The section of the main route between the two ends of the loop was omitted. (Note: A separate proposal in 1899 by the Baker Street and Waterloo Railway for a branch from its planned line near Regent's Park to Euston was rejected by Parliament. The station building would have been located in Cardington Street.) In 1900, the CCE&HR was taken over by a consortium led by American financier Charles Yerkes which raised the necessary finance.

The same year, a proposal was presented to Parliament by the Islington and Euston Railway (I&ER) for an extension of the City and South London Railway (C&SLR) from Angel to Euston. At the time, the C&SLR was in the process of constructing an extension to Angel from its recently opened terminus at Moorgate Street. (Note: The C&SLR was suffering from a poor financial reputation at the time due to what was seen as the wasteful abandonment of its original terminal at King William Street when the extension to Moorgate was built. The I&ER was constituted as a nominally separate company to avoid this poor reputation, though it shared a chairman with the C&SLR.) The extension plan was initially permitted in 1901, but delays in the parliamentary process meant that it had to be re-submitted the following year. The second submission was opposed by the Metropolitan Railway, which saw the extension as competition to its service between King's Cross and Moorgate, and the plan was rejected. A third attempt, presented to parliament in November 1902 by the C&SLR itself, was successful and approved in 1903.

==== Construction and opening ====
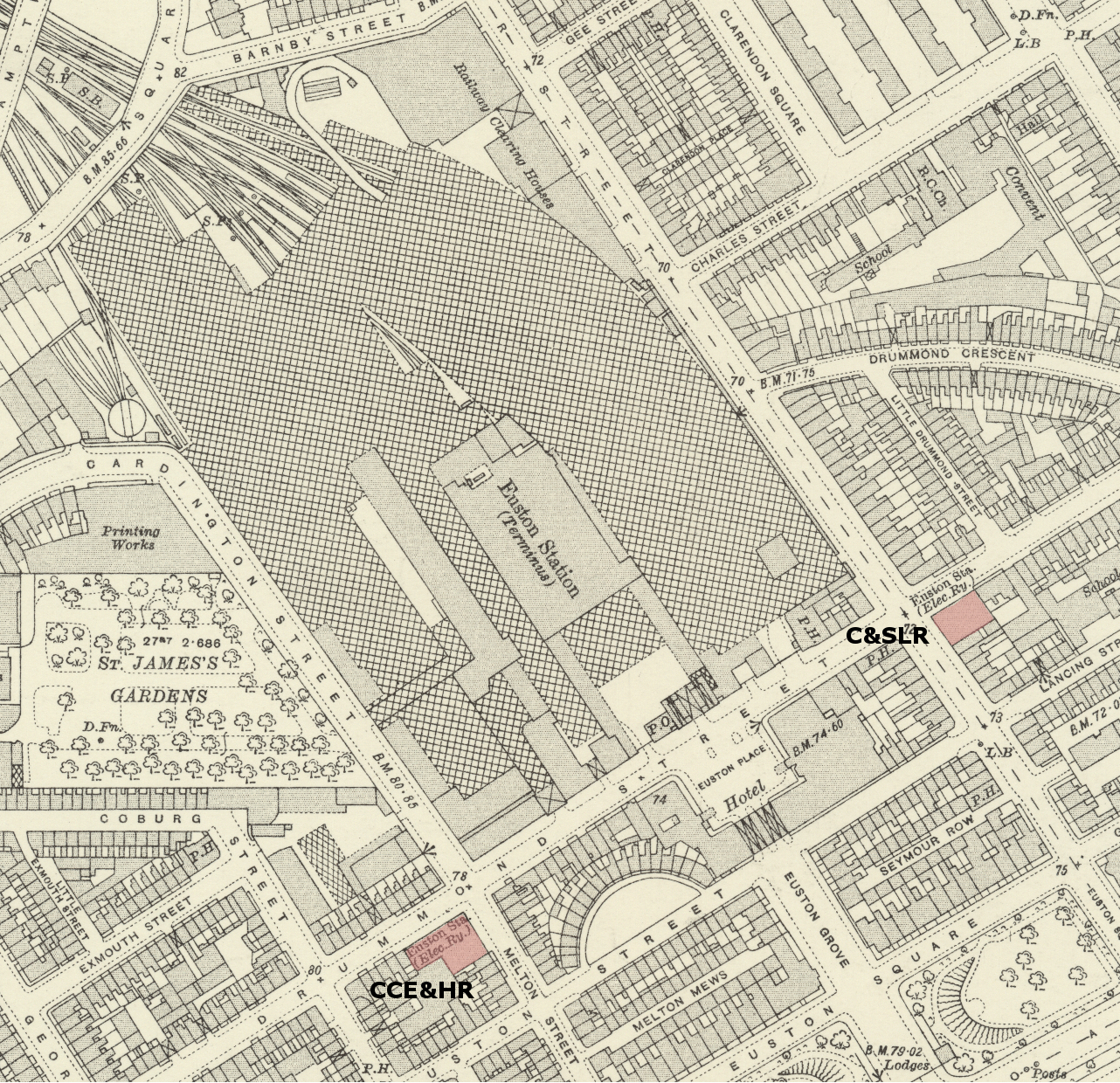
Locations of the two companies' stations highlighted on a 1914 map

With funding obtained, tunnelling for the CCE&HR was carried out between September 1903 and December 1905, after which the station buildings and fitting-out of the tunnels commenced. The C&SLR's Euston extension was constructed at the same time from the newly opened Angel station and opened on 12 May 1907, with the station building designed by Sidney Smith located on the east side of Eversholt Street. The CCE&HR opened on 22 June 1907; its building, designed by Leslie Green, is located at the corner of Drummond Street and Melton Street.

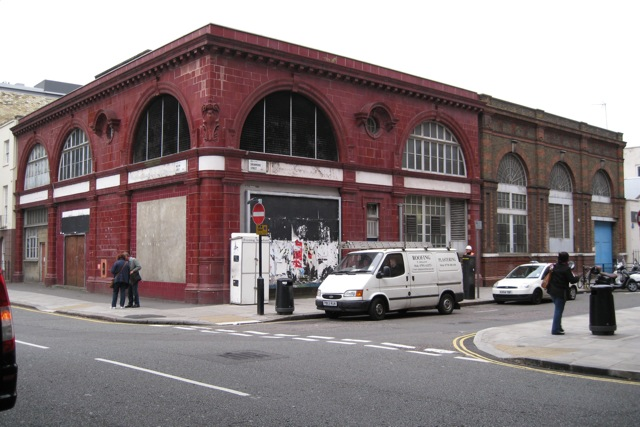
The disused CCE&HR station building on the corner of Drummond Street and Melton Street

Although built and initially operated as two separate stations by the two companies, the C&SLR and the CCE&HR platforms were sufficiently close together that a deep level interchange was constructed between the passages of the two stations with a small ticket office for passengers changing between the lines. Another passage led to lifts that surfaced within the main line station itself. With the entrance within the main line station able to serve both sets of platforms satisfactorily, the separate station buildings were considered unnecessary, and they both closed on 30 September 1914. The CCE&HR building remains (converted for use as an electrical substation), but the C&SLR's building was demolished in 1934 to enable the construction of Euston House for the London, Midland and Scottish Railway.

==== Reconstruction and extension ====
Most of the C&SLR's route had been constructed with tunnels 10 feet 2 inches (3.10 m) or 10 feet 6 inches (3.20 m) in diameter, smaller than the 11 feet 6 inches (3.51 m) diameter that had been adopted as the standard for the CCE&HR and other deep level tube lines. (Note: The only section of the C&SLR's tunnels constructed with 11 ft 6 in diameter tunnels was the section between Bank and Moorgate.) The smaller tunnel size restricted the capacity of the C&SLR's trains and, in 1912, the C&SLR published a bill for their enlargement. A separate bill was published at the same time by the London Electric Railway (LER), (Note: The LER was formed by the Underground Group in 1910 through a merger of the CCE&HR with its two other deep level railways, the Baker Street and Waterloo Railway and the Great Northern, Piccadilly and Brompton Railway.) that included plans to construct tunnels to connect the C&SLR at Euston to the CCE&HR's station at Camden Town. Together, the works proposed in these bills would enable trains of each company to run over the route of the other, effectively combining the two separate railways. The reconstruction and extension works were postponed during World War I and did not begin until 1922. The C&SLR platforms and the tunnels between Euston and Moorgate were closed for the reconstruction on 8 August 1922. They reopened on 20 April 1924 along with the new link to Camden Town, though one station on that section, City Road, never reopened.

=== London & North Western Railway ===
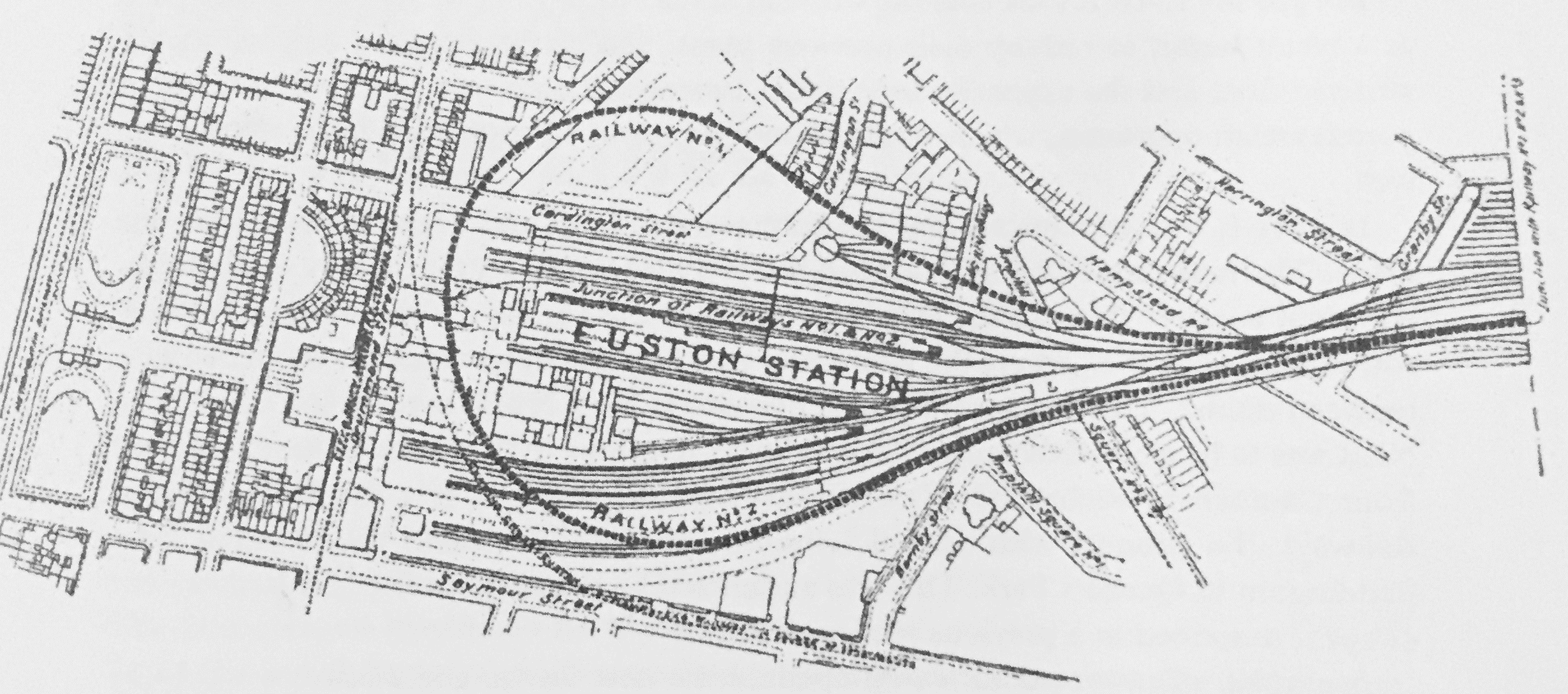
Map of LNWR's proposed loop railway line under Euston station

In 1906, the London and North Western Railway (LNWR), operator of the main line station, announced proposals to construct an underground station of its own. The company planned to construct new tracks parallel with its line to Watford, the first section of which would have been constructed as a single-track loop 1,588 yards (1,452 m) long and 55 feet 6 inches (16.92 m) deep beneath the surface station. The single platform underground station would have been close to the CCE&HR's platforms. The proposal was presented to Parliament in November 1906 and received royal assent on 26 July 1907. The LNWR did not proceed with the loop plan and the underground station, which were dropped in 1911. (Note: Instead, the LNWR's trains for the new line operated from the surface station and the company collaborated with the Underground Electric Railways Company of London to extend Bakerloo tube services from Paddington to Queen's Park in tunnel, where they met the LNWR's new line. Bakerloo services started to Queen's Park in February 1915, before extension to Willesden Junction in May 1915 and on to Watford Junction in April 1917.)

=== Victoria line ===
==== Planning ====
Plans for the route that eventually became the Victoria line date from the 1940s. A proposal for a new underground railway line linking north-east London with the centre was included in the County of London Plan in 1943. Between 1946 and 1954, a series of routes were proposed by different transport authorities to connect various places in south and north or north-east London. Each of these connected the three main line termini at King's Cross, Euston and Victoria. (Note: In 1946, the Railway (London Plan) Committee published a report including "Route 8 – South to North link from East Croydon to Finsbury Park", a main line service running between Norbury and Hornsey in tunnel via Streatham Hill, Brixton, Vauxhall, Victoria, Bond Street, Euston, King's Cross and Finsbury Park. In 1947, the London Passenger Transport Board produced a plan for a similar route for a tube line running into north-east London. This ran between Coulsdon North or Sanderstead and Walthamstow (Hoe Street) or Waltham Cross. These plans were reviewed by the British Transport Commission in 1949 and a feasibility study was recommended. This became a combined route, "Route C" running between Walthamstow and Victoria.) A route was approved in 1955 with future extensions to be decided later, though funding for the construction was not approved by the government until 1962.

==== Construction and opening ====
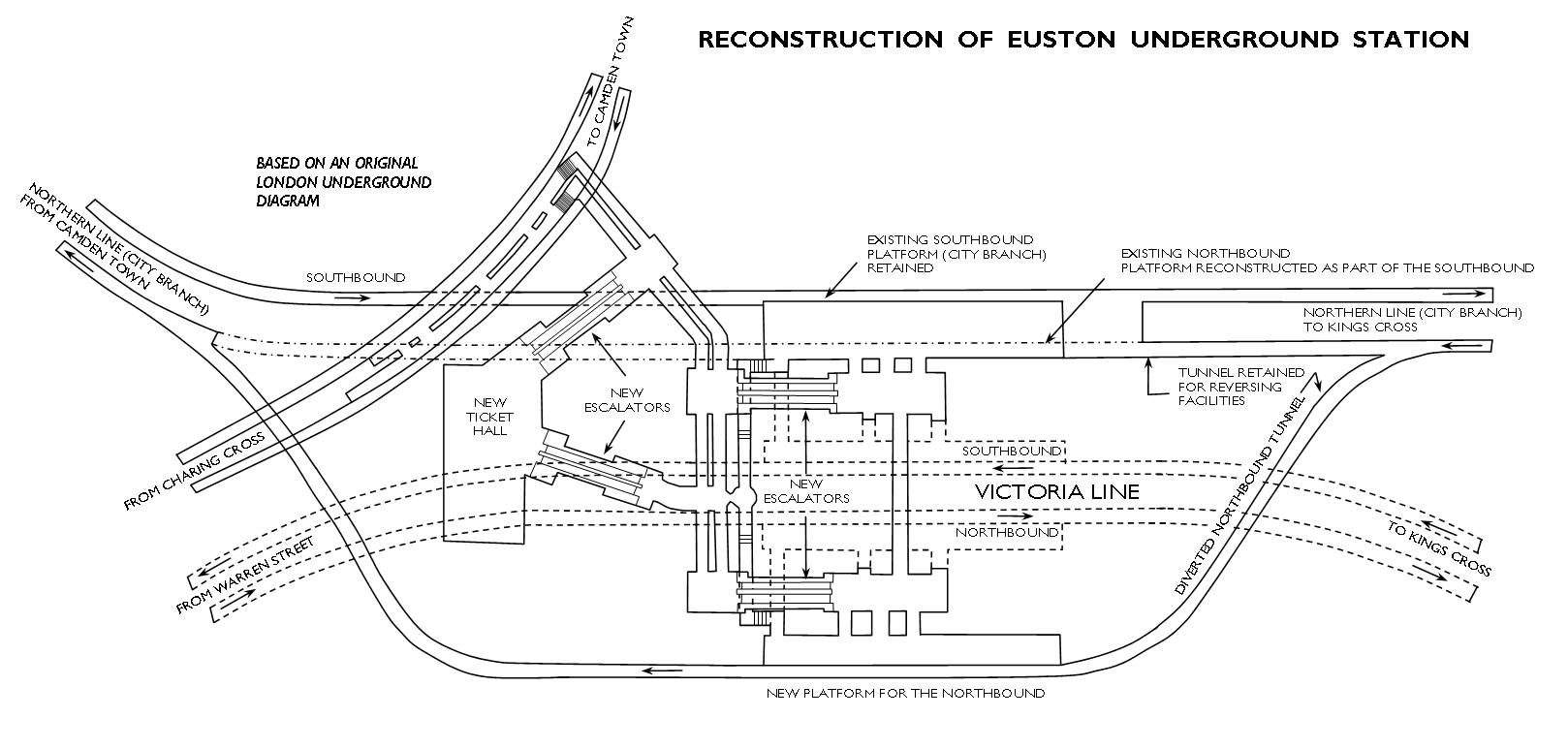
Plan of Euston station showing arrangement of platforms and alterations needed to accommodate the Victoria line

At Euston, major reconstruction works were undertaken to incorporate the new Victoria line platforms so that cross-platform interchanges could be provided with the Northern line's Bank branch—the former C&SLR route to King's Cross and Bank. Unlike the Charing Cross branch tracks, which were in separate tunnels with side platforms, the Bank branch tracks served an island platform in a single large tunnel. These platforms suffered from dangerous overcrowding at peak times. To provide cross-platform interchange, a new section of tunnel was constructed for northbound Bank branch trains, which were diverted to a new platform south of the original alignment. (Note: The diversion took place on Sunday 15 October 1967.) The redundant northbound track bed in the station tunnel was filled in to form a wider southbound platform. The new Victoria line platforms were excavated between and parallel to the original and the new Bank branch tunnels. Each pair of platforms was linked via a concourse served by escalators. (Note: This arrangement results in an unusual feature of the station: a passenger changing between the Victoria line and Northern line Bank branch will find that trains on adjacent platforms travel in opposite directions even though both are either northbound or southbound (see diagram).)

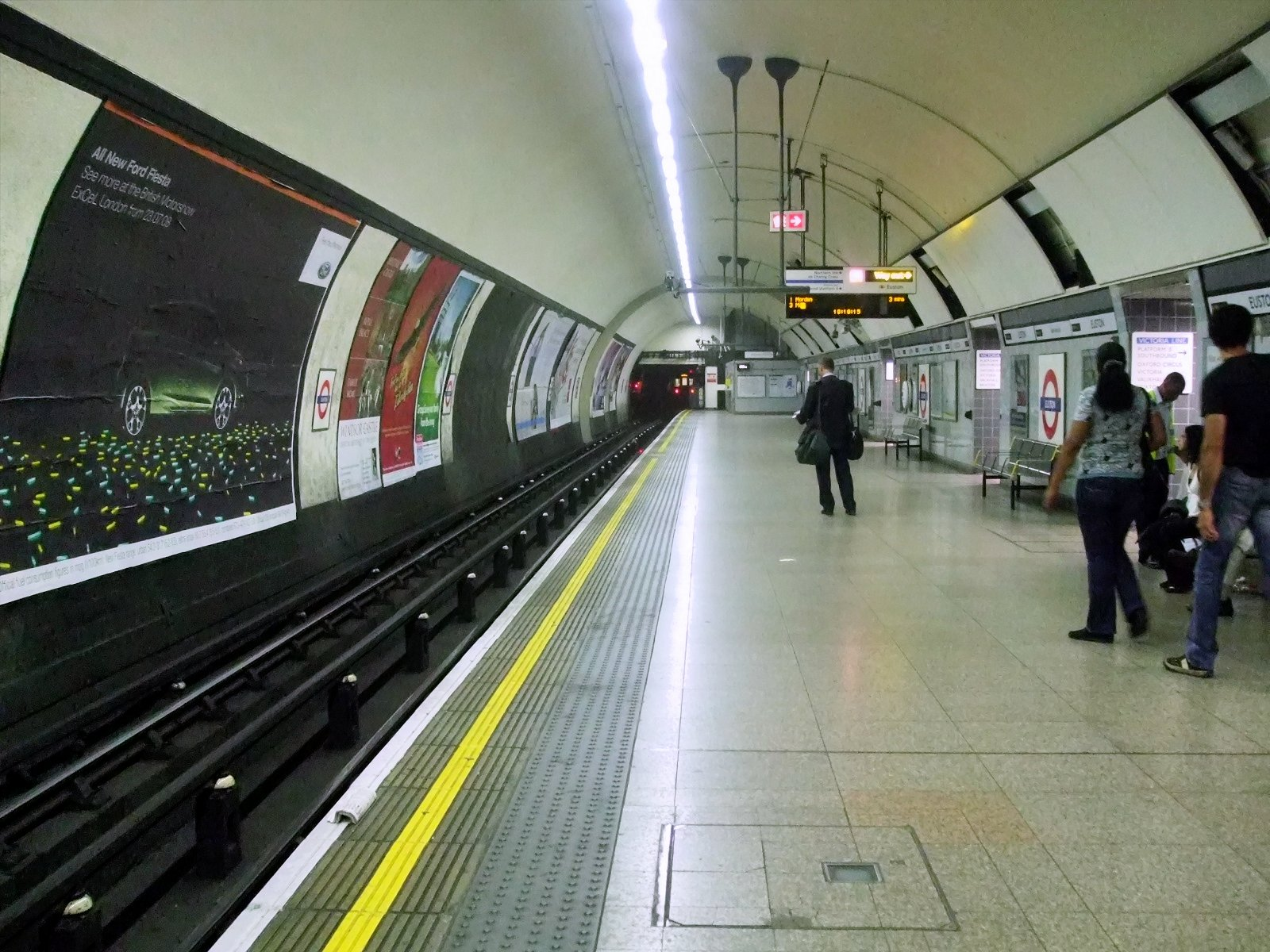
The extra wide southbound platform of the Northern line's Bank branch formed by the removal of the northbound track (passengers on the right are standing where the northbound track was)

In conjunction with the reconstruction of the main line station above, a new ticket hall was excavated below the concourse with two sets of escalators replacing the lifts. The escalators provide access to and from an intermediate passenger circulation level, which, in turn, gives access to the Northern line Charing Cross branch platforms and two further sets of escalators; one set each serving the northbound and southbound Victoria and Northern line Bank branch platforms. Interchanges between the northbound and southbound Victoria and Northern Bank Line platforms are made via a passageway at the lower level so as to avoid the need to use the escalators. An emergency stair to the intermediate interchange level is located midway along the passageway. The Victoria line platforms opened on 1 December 1968 when the second section of the line was opened between Highbury & Islington and Warren Street. Disused passages remain with tiling and posters from the 1960s.

== Future proposals ==
Unlike the neighbouring main line termini, St Pancras and King's Cross, Euston is not served by the Circle, Hammersmith & City and Metropolitan lines. Euston Square station, which is served by these lines, is approximately 250 metres (270 yd) to the south-west. Plans for the redevelopment of the main line station for High Speed 2 (HS2) include the construction of a direct connection to Euston Square. The CCE&HR station building on Melton Street sits within the HS2 development site area and will be demolished to make way for the station.

Proposals for Crossrail 2 include an underground station serving Euston and St Pancras that will be integrated with the existing London Underground station.

A new underground line between Euston and Canary Wharf has been suggested and is being considered by the government.

== Services and connections ==
=== Services ===
Euston station is on the Northern and Victoria lines in London fare zone 1. On the Northern line's Bank branch the station is between Camden Town and King's Cross St Pancras. On the line's Charing Cross branch it is between Mornington Crescent and Warren Street. On the Victoria line it is between Warren Street and King's Cross St. Pancras.

Train frequencies vary throughout the day, but generally, Northern line trains operate every 2–6 minutes from approximately 05:49 to 00:45 northbound and 05:49 to 00:28 southbound. Victoria line trains operate every 1–6 minutes from approximately 05:41 to 00:42 northbound and 05:31 to 00:26 southbound.

Preceding station	London Underground	Following station
Camden Town towards Edgware, Mill Hill East or High Barnet	Northern line Bank branch	King's Cross St Pancras towards Morden
Mornington Crescent towards Edgware, Mill Hill East or High Barnet	Northern line Charing Cross branch	Warren Street towards Battersea Power Station, Morden or Kennington
Warren Street towards Brixton	Victoria line	King's Cross St Pancras towards Walthamstow Central

=== Connections ===
London Bus routes are served by Euston bus station outside the main line station.

== Notes and references ==
=== Bibliography ===
- Badsey-Ellis, Antony (2005). London's Lost Tube Schemes. Capital Transport. ISBN 185414-293-3.
- Connor, J.E. (2006) [1999]. London's Disused Underground Stations (2nd ed.). Capital Transport. ISBN 1-85414-250-X.
- Day, John R; Reed, John (2010) [1963]. The Story of London's Underground (11th ed.). Capital Transport. ISBN 978-1-85414-341-9.
- Railway (London Plan) Committee (1946). Report to the Minister of War Transport. HMSO.
- Rose, Douglas (1999) [1980]. The London Underground, A Diagrammatic History (7th ed.). Douglas Rose/Capital Transport. ISBN 1-85414-219-4.
- Wolmar, Christian (2005) [2004]. The Subterranean Railway: How the London Underground Was Built and How It Changed the City Forever. Atlantic Books. ISBN 1-84354-023-1.
