= Parsons Green tube station =

London Underground station

Parsons Green
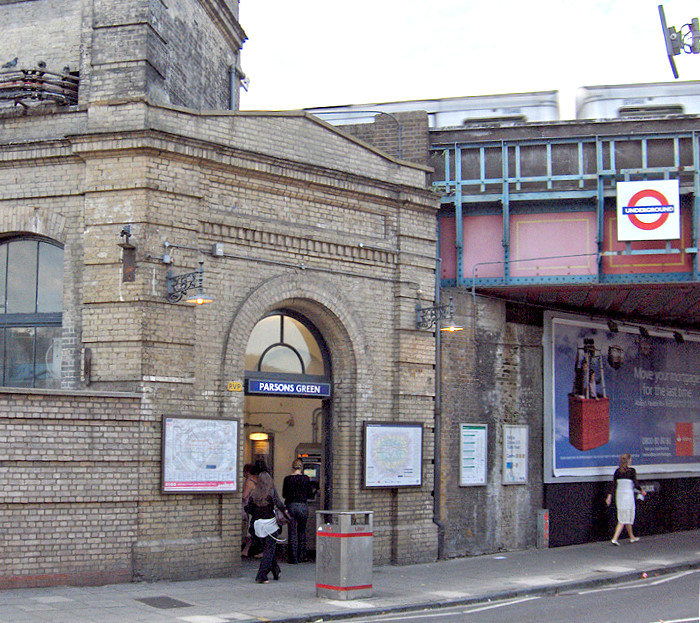
- Station entrance
- Interactive map of Parsons Green

General information
- Location: Parsons Green
- Local authority: London Borough of Hammersmith and Fulham
- Managed by: London Underground
- Number of platforms: 2
- Fare zone: 2

London Underground annual entry and exit
- 2020: ▼3.03 million
- 2021: ▼2.99 million
- 2022: ▲5.03 million
- 2023: ▲5.57 million
- 2024: ▲5.80 million

Key dates
- 1 March 1880: Opened (DR)

Other information
- External links: TfL station info page
- Coordinates: 51°28′31″N 0°12′4″W

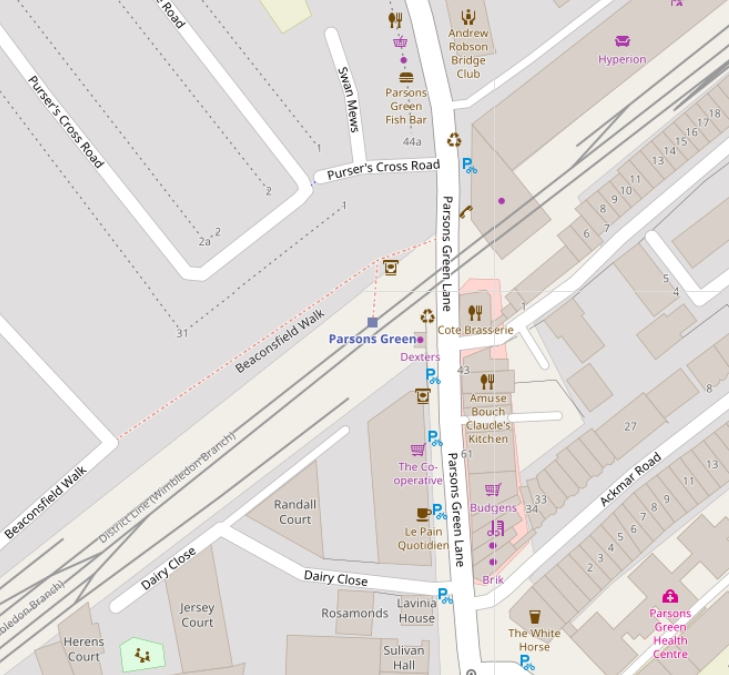
Map of the station area

Parsons Green is a London Underground station. It is on the Wimbledon branch of the District line, between Putney Bridge and Fulham Broadway stations. It is in London fare zone 2. There are entrances on Parsons Green Lane and in Beaconsfield Walk. The station is a short distance north of the green itself. It was previously a train-operator depot, until functions were transferred to Earl's Court.

== History ==
Designed by a Mr Clemence under the supervision of John Wolfe-Barry, the station was opened on 1 March 1880 when the Metropolitan District Railway (now the District line) extended its line south from West Brompton to Putney Bridge.

=== Past plans ===
Parsons Green was a proposed stop on the Chelsea-Hackney Line, known now as Crossrail 2. It would have either supplemented or replaced the existing District line service on much of the Wimbledon Branch.

North of the station, the line would have branched off into a new tunnelled section that could carry it into Victoria station, via Chelsea station, a new station on the Kings Road. Crossrail 2 was to have been built to National Rail standards and go to Wimbledon via Clapham Junction instead. The route was safeguarded in 1991 and again in 2007.

=== Bombing ===
On 15 September 2017, around 8:20 am BST, an explosion inspired by ISIL on a train carriage at the station injured 30 people. No fatalities were reported. The explosion was treated by the Metropolitan Police as a terrorist incident.

The attacker, Ahmed Hassan, was tried for attempted murder in March 2018. He was convicted and sentenced to life imprisonment and must serve a minimum of 34 years. On 6 April 2019 it was announced that Lt. Col. Craig Palmer, a passenger on the affected tube train, had been awarded the Queen's Commendation for Bravery for his part in helping to bring the bomber to trial and conviction.

Preceding station	London Underground	Following station
Putney Bridge towards Wimbledon	District line Wimbledon branch	Fulham Broadway towards Edgware Road or Upminster
