= Walham Green =

Area located on the border of Fulham and Chelsea, west London

Coordinates: 51.480°N 0.195°W

- Location within Greater London
- London borough: Hammersmith & Fulham
- Ceremonial county: Greater London
- Region: London
- Country: England
- Sovereign state: United Kingdom
- Post town: LONDON
- Postcode district: SW6
- Dialling code: 020
- Police: Metropolitan
- Fire: London
- Ambulance: London
- UK Parliament: Chelsea and Fulham
- London Assembly: West Central

A map showing the Walham ward of Fulham Metropolitan Borough as it appeared in 1916.

Walham Green is the historic name of an English village, now part of inner London, in the parish of Fulham in the County of Middlesex. It was located between the hamlet of North End (now renamed West Kensington) to the north, and Parsons Green to the south. To the east it was bounded by Counter's Creek, the historical boundary with the parish of Chelsea, and to the south-east is Sands End.

Within the area is the old athletics stadium of Stamford Bridge, now home to Chelsea F.C.

== History ==
In the 19th century Counter's Creek became the Kensington Canal, soon to be replaced by the West London Railway, and Walham Green acquired its own parish church of St John in 1828 on the site of the village pond. With the arrival of the District Railway and urbanisation, the heart of Fulham shifted from its centuries-old All Saints parish church on the Thames and the area of Fulham High Street to Walham Green, the centre of which was subsequently renamed Fulham Broadway. From 1880 to 1952 Fulham Broadway tube station was called Walham Green. All that remains of the village's former identity is the tree-lined street called 'Walham Grove'.

Walham Green has a history of brewing dating back to 1765. The Swan Brewery (and its associated inn) was located about 50 yards south-east of St John's Church on what is now Fulham Broadway. The Stocken family were brewers here for many years. In 1880 the Swan Brewery (now run by Messrs Stansfeld & Co) was relocated to 3 acres of land next to Eel Brook Common, just off the Fulham Road, set back behind the houses between Cassidy Road and Shottendane Road. The new brewery was a stylish affair, as was typical of the mid-Victorian era, even the 130 foot chimney was ornate. The brewery stopped brewing in 1928, and was closed shortly afterwards. The site was cleared, and the chimney demolished in 1930. The site of the brewery is now the location of Fulham Court.

Walham Green was the venue for the first AAC Championships, when the Amateur Athletic Club held the 1866 AAC Championships on 23 March 1866, in the grounds of Thomas Jones, 7th Viscount Ranelagh's Beaufort House.

== Fulham Broadway ==
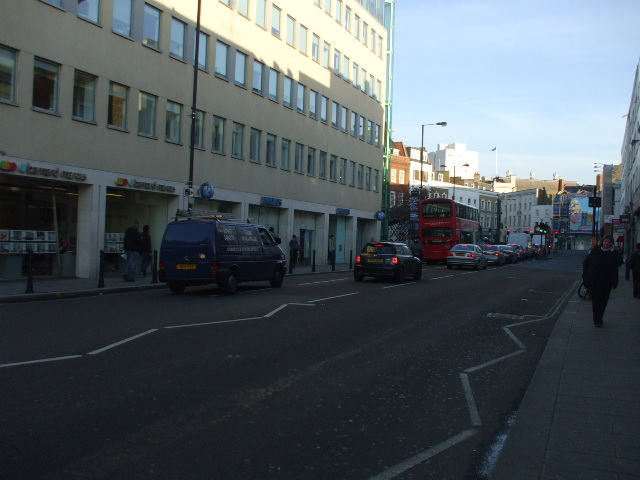
Fulham Broadway, site of the former 'Granville Theatre'.

Fulham Broadway denotes a section of the Fulham Road within the London Borough of Hammersmith and Fulham which contains the former Grade II listed Fulham Town Hall, the eponymous underground station and the intersection with the busy commercial thoroughfare that is North End Road and Harwood Road. A triangle – by the bus turning alley, with an office block on it – is the site of Frank Matcham's old Granville Theatre, which closed in 1971. Fulham Broadway also refers to the area in the immediate vicinity of the station which is now set inside a shopping mall with a cinema complex, and the pedestrianised streets by St John's church, which offer a host of restaurants, pubs, cafés and small shops, including a printers. The Royal Mail sorting office is nearby as are four supermarkets, one of them large with a car park and one that specialises in organic produce.

The rest of Walham Green village has been subsumed in several conservation areas and is today considered a desirable place to live for young professionals and Chelsea 'overspill'. Residents have included Gloria Hunniford and Loyd Grossman. Nearby attractions include Parson's Green, the bars, clubs and restaurants of the New King's Road and Chelsea Harbour.

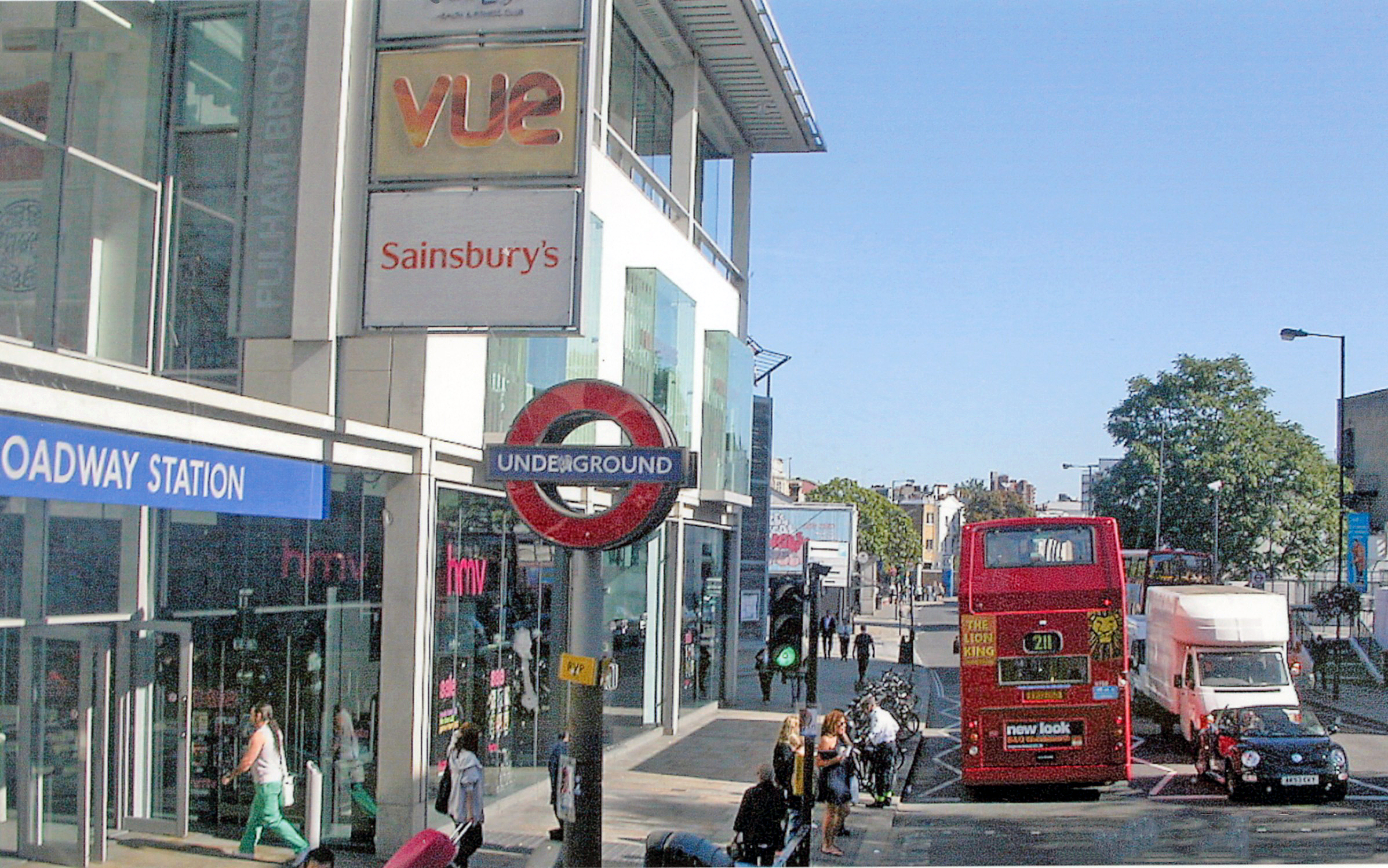
Entrance to Fulham Broadway station.

== Nearest stations ==
- Fulham Broadway tube station
- West Brompton station
- West Kensington tube station
- Barons Court tube station
- Parsons Green tube station
- Imperial Wharf railway station
