= London Buses route 211 =

London bus route

211
- Transport UK London Bus New Routemaster at Battersea Power Station in September 2026

Overview
- Operator: Transport UK London Bus
- Garage: Battersea
- Vehicle: New Routemaster
- Peak vehicle requirement: 14
- Predecessors: Route 11; Route 511
- Night-time: Night Bus N11

Route
- Start: Hammersmith bus station
- Via: Fulham; Chelsea; Sloane Square
- End: Battersea Power Station
- Length: 7 miles (11 km)

Service
- Level: Daily
- Frequency: About every 8-15 minutes
- Journey time: 29-57 minutes
- Operates: 05:05 until 00:39

London Buses route 211 is a Transport for London contracted bus route in London, England. Running between Hammersmith bus station and Battersea Power Station, it is operated by Transport UK London Bus.

== History ==
Route 211 was introduced on 17 July 1993 replacing Red Arrow route 511 between Waterloo and Victoria stations, before continuing to Hammersmith bus station along the existing route 11, replacing the latter north of Fulham Broadway station.

It was operated by London General until June 1998 when upon retendering passed to Travel London who introduced a fleet of Optare Excels. It was included in the sale of Travel London to Limebourne in August 2000 and again to Connex in July 2001. In November 2002 the service received new Alexander ALX400 bodied Dennis Trident 2s with the service upgraded in preparation for the introduction of the London congestion charge.

Route 211 was included in the sale of the business back to Travel London in February 2004 which in turn was sold to Abellio London in May 2009.

On 30 June 2012, brand new Alexander Dennis Enviro400s and Alexander Dennis Enviro400Hs were introduced. In June 2016 the route began being operated using New Routemasters.

On 29 January 2019 the route transferred to London United. On 29 June 2024, the route was withdrawn between Waterloo station and Sloane Square station and rerouted to Battersea Power Station. On this date, the route transferred back to Transport UK, the successor to Abellio London.

== Current route ==
Route 211 operates via these primary locations:

- Hammersmith bus station for Hammersmith station
- Fulham Broadway station
- Chelsea & Westminster Hospital
- Royal Marsden Hospital
- Royal Brompton Hospital
- Chelsea Old Town Hall
- King's Road
- Sloane Square station
- Lister Hospital
- Battersea Park station
- Battersea Dogs & Cats Home
- Battersea Power Station

== In popular culture ==
Lego used a slightly modified route 211 (called 211B) for their Lego Creator 7+ set number 40220. This has the next stop as "Westminster". This set is a shrunken down version of the Lego 10258 Creator - London Bus, which features a fictional route 9 to Brickston.
