= London Buses route 11 =

London bus route

11
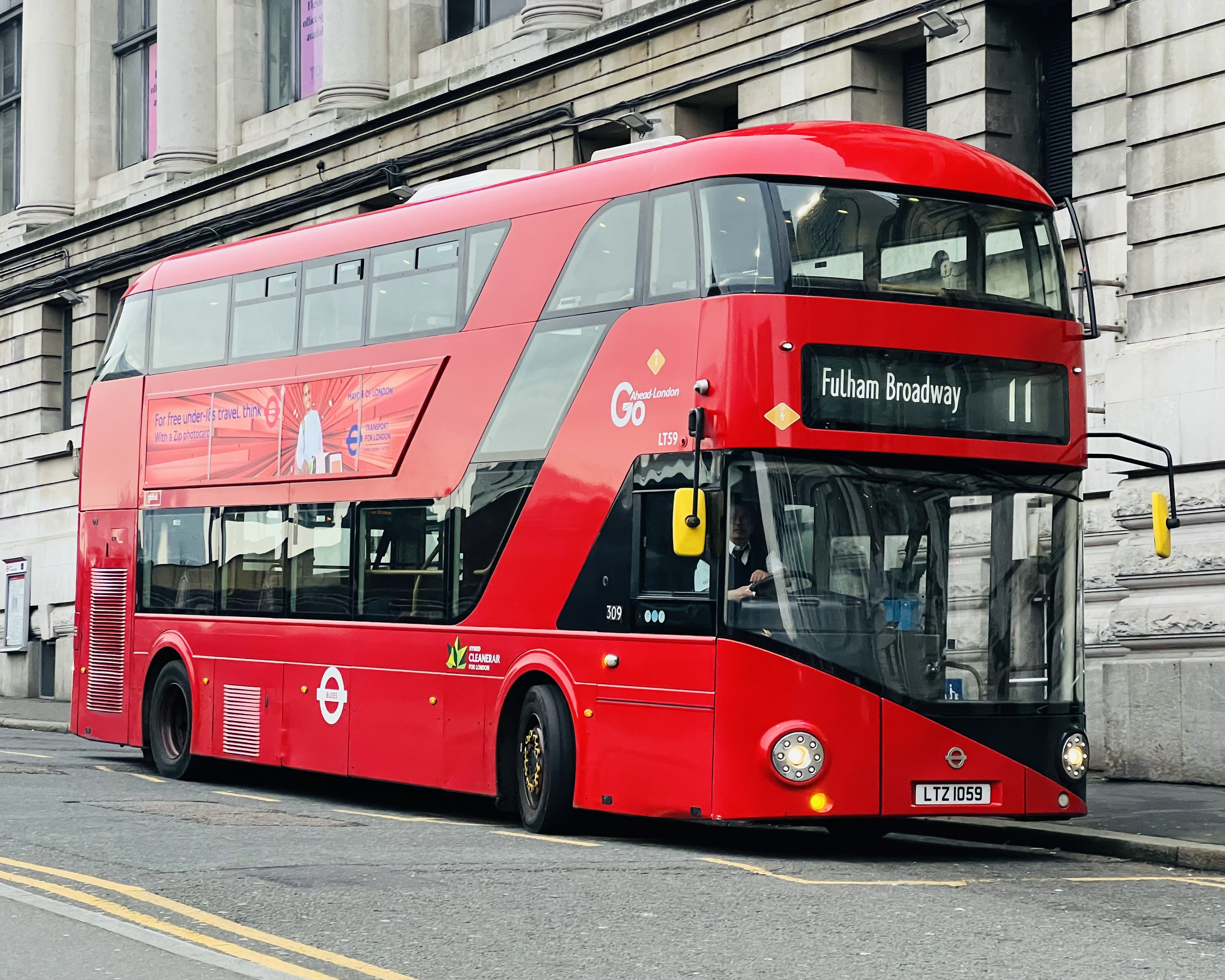
- London General New Routemaster at Waterloo station in November 2023

Overview
- Operator: London General (Go-Ahead London)
- Garage: Stockwell
- Vehicle: New Routemaster
- Peak vehicle requirement: 14
- Night-time: Night Bus N11

Route
- Start: Fulham Town Hall
- Via: Chelsea; Sloane Square; Victoria; Parliament Square
- End: Waterloo station
- Length: 5 miles (8.0 km)

Service
- Level: Daily
- Frequency: About every 10 minutes
- Operates: 05:15 until 01:30

London Buses route 11 is a Transport for London contracted bus route in London, England. Running between Fulham Town Hall and Waterloo station, it is operated by Go-Ahead London subsidiary London General.

== History ==
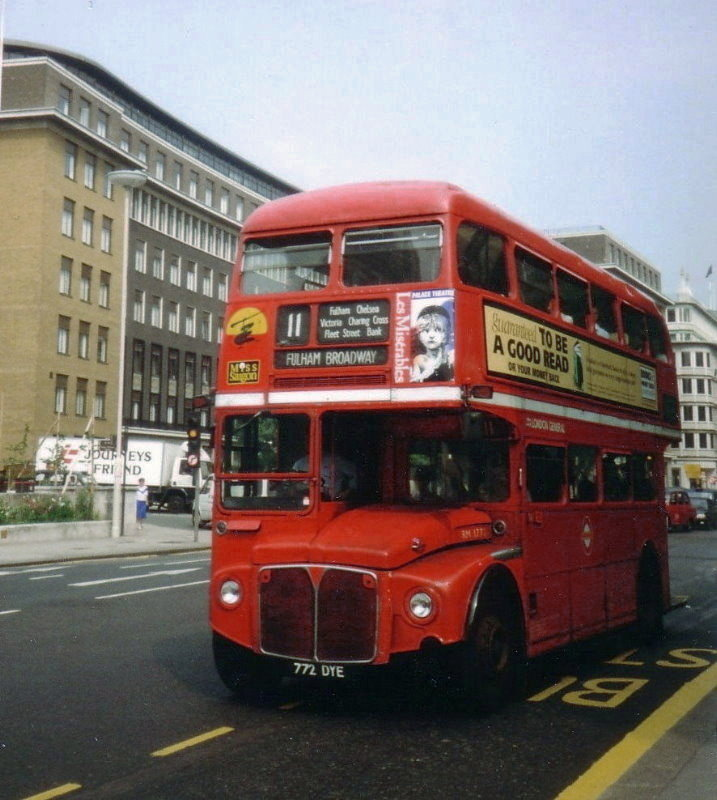
AEC Routemaster in June 1993

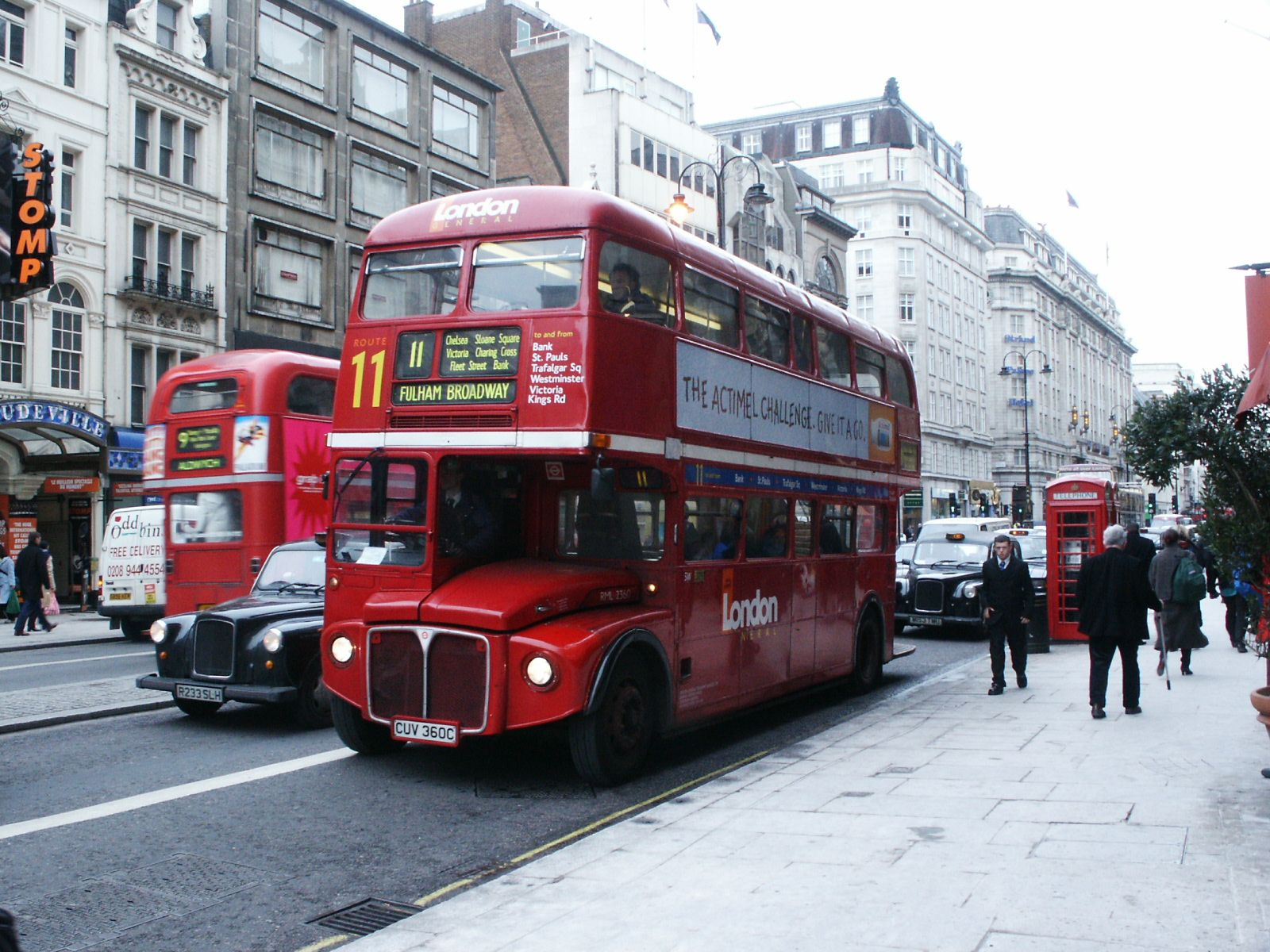
London General AEC Routemaster on the Strand in January 2003

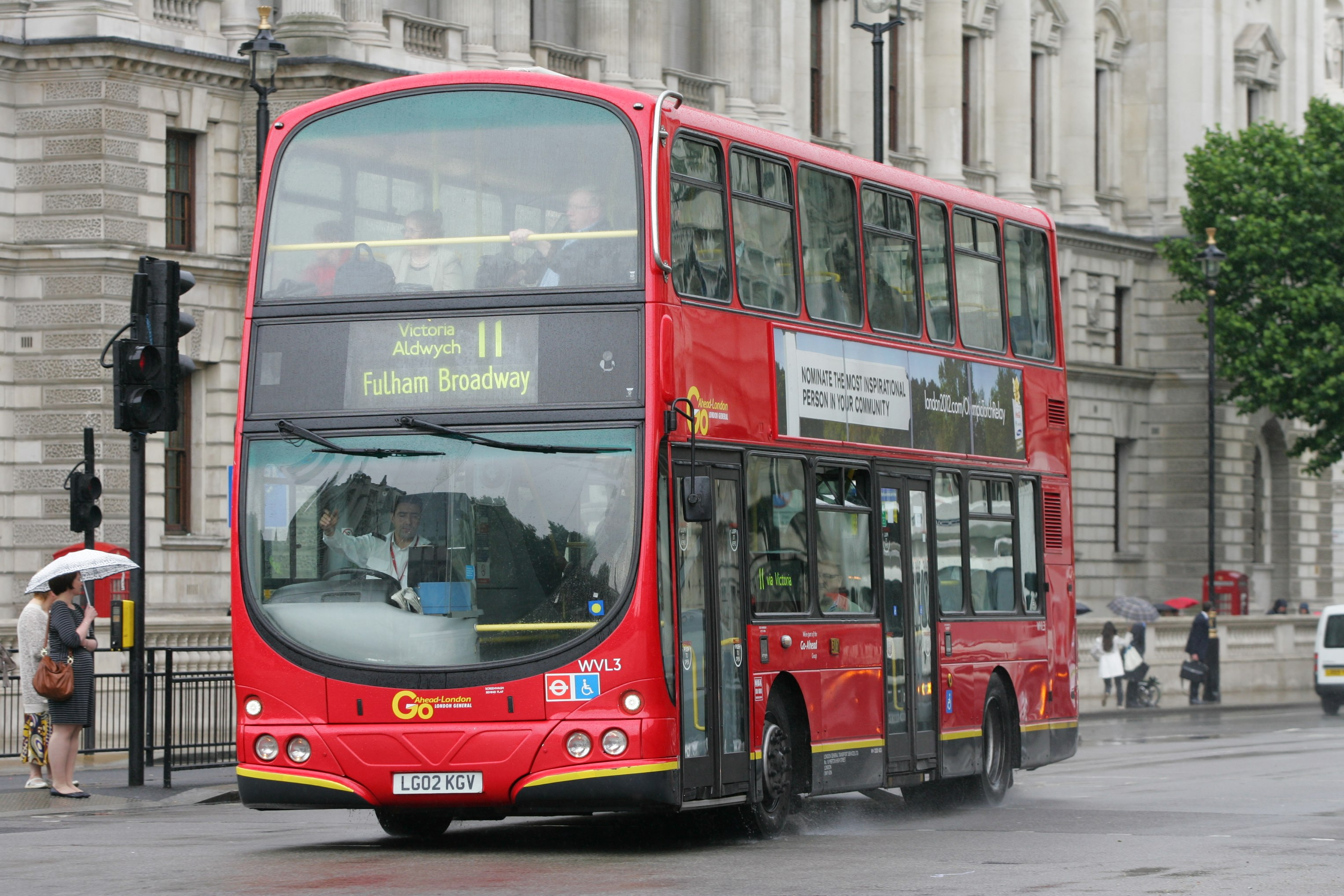
London General Wright Eclipse Gemini bodied Volvo B7TL on Whitehall in June 2011

Route 11 was introduced by the London General Omnibus Company in August 1906, and is amongst the oldest routes to have operated continuously in London, although its route has changed on several occasions. It was the first route operated by London Road-Car Co Ltd, running from Victoria to Hammersmith via Chelsea. From 1916, LGOC B-type buses allocated to Old Kent Road garage were used until 1924, when it was allocated to Kingston garage.

On 5 August 1922, Leyland LB (London Bus) type buses were introduced on route 11 by Arthur George Partridge and Christopher Dodson Ltd with chocolate livery and the fleet name "Express". The first AEC NS-Type buses entered service on route 11 in May 1923. On 5 September 1932, Q1 buses were used on this route which operated from Shoreditch to Shepherd's Bush.

In May 1949, Leyland Titan RTW buses were introduced on route 11. AEC Regent III RT buses were in service on route 11 in the 1950s. On 12 June 1959, the fourth AEC Routemaster in passenger service (RM14), entered service on route 11 from Riverside garage.

The route starts at Fulham Broadway and operates via the West End and some of London's most famous landmarks to Waterloo station. The journey from the top deck is a cheap means of sightseeing in London. It previously ran to Hammersmith until being replaced west of Fulham Broadway on 17 July 1993 by route 211.

In October 1996, London General buses operating on route 11 from its Waterloo garage switched to City Diesel.

On 4 June 2002, Queen Elizabeth II's Golden Jubilee, the Metropolitan Police flagged down a Number 11 bus and used it as temporary transport for twenty-three peaceful anti-royalty demonstrators whom they had arrested after the demonstration, most of them in a nearby pub. The bus was used to take the protestors to various police stations for questioning. The protesters sued the police, and the Met settled out of court with an apology, an admission of unlawful detention, and a payment of £3,500 to each protester.

Go-Ahead London has successfully retained route 11 with new contracts starting on 30 October 2010 and 31 October 2015.

New Routemasters were introduced on 21 September 2013. In September 2016, conductors were removed from buses on route 11 and buses now operate with drivers only and the rear platform closed.

In 2021, the frequency of the service was reduced from six buses per hour to five on Monday to Sunday daytimes.

In July 2022, Transport for London opened a public consultation on proposals for the route to be withdrawn as part of the Central London Buses Review. In November 2022, it was announced that the route would not be withdrawn but would instead be rerouted to terminate at Waterloo station instead of Liverpool Street station. This change was implemented on 29 April 2023.

== In popular culture ==
In John le Carré's novel The Spy Who Came in from the Cold the route is referred to by the character Alec Leamas. When pressed on an opinion on faith by his idealistic lover, Leamas cynically responds that "I believe an eleven bus will take me to Hammersmith. I don't believe it's driven by Father Christmas."

The route has a cameo appearance in the 2006 film The Da Vinci Code, where the protagonists take a number 11 bus from near Temple Church to get to "Chelsea Library", though they get off at Westminster Abbey; this is the same route the bus takes in real life.

== Current route ==
Route 11 operates via these primary locations:

- Fulham Town Hall
- Chelsea World's End
- King's Road
- Sloane Square station
- Victoria Coach Station
- Victoria station
- St James's Park station
- Westminster station
- St Thomas' Hospital
- Waterloo station

The bus route passes many tourist attractions including:

- Westminster Cathedral
- Westminster Abbey
- Methodist Central Hall Westminster
- St Margaret's, Westminster
- Churchill War Rooms

It also went near the Royal Courts of Justice, St Clement Danes, Aldwych station, High Commission of Australia, Savoy Hotel, Nelson's Column, Admiralty Arch, Big Ben, Palace of Westminster and New Scotland Yard. The Daily Telegraph called the route one of the "best routes for sightseeing on a shoestring". There is an e-book tour guide indicating the points of interest along the number 11 bus route and detailing connecting buses to other London tourist attractions.
