= King's Road Chelsea railway station =

Proposed Crossrail 2 stop

King's Road Chelsea
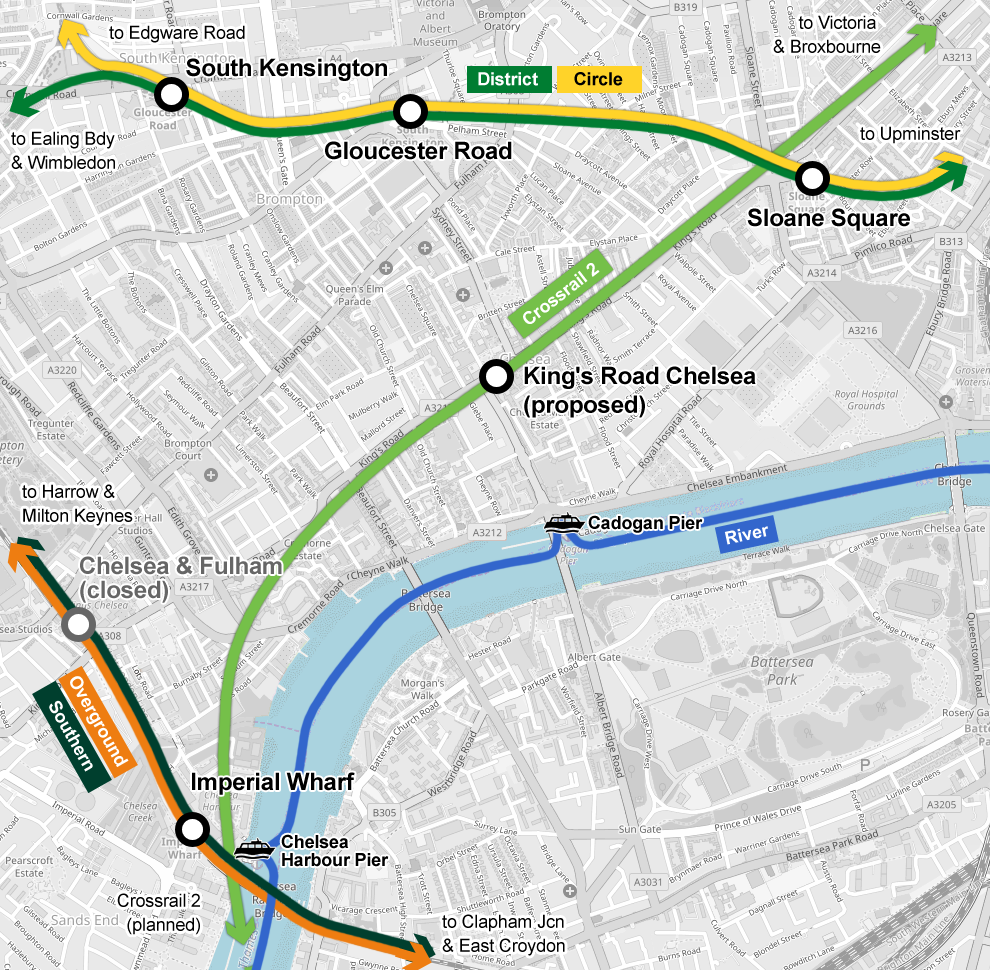
- Proposed location in Chelsea
- Interactive map of King's Road Chelsea

General information
- Location: Chelsea
- Local authority: Royal Borough of Kensington and Chelsea
- Owner: Transport for London or Network Rail
- Fare zone: 1

Other information
- Coordinates: 51.4875°N 0.169°W

King's Road Chelsea railway station is a proposed station on Crossrail 2, a planned underground railway line through London in the United Kingdom. If constructed, the station would serve the King's Road area of Chelsea.

== Location ==
A station in the Chelsea area has been included in the planning for the Chelsea-Hackney line since 1989. A location on the corner Dovehouse Street and King's Road was safeguarded for the proposed station in 2008 Since then, the location of the proposed station has been the subject of consultations in 2013, 2014 and 2015. and has been considered, with updates, as late as 2016.

The 2013 consultation included a station named "King's Road" under both route alignments considered, with a tentative identification of its location at the junction between Dovehouse Street and Kings Road. The analysis of consultation results noted that despite supporters of the proposed railway outnumbering opposition across all areas, the Royal Borough of Kensington and Chelsea had "a much higher level of opposition" than other boroughs.

The 2014 consultation sought views on three options: a station at King’s Road; an alternative "Chelsea West" station, located near the World's End estate; or "no station at all" in Chelsea, with "a non-stop link between Victoria and Clapham Junction".

In response to this second consultation, a decision was taken "to proceed with the route alignment via […] King’s Road Chelsea" and "to retain the proposed Crossrail 2 station in the Chelsea area, at the original location of the King’s Road, sometimes known as the ‘Fire Station’ site", while continuing "further work" to arrive at an "optimal recommendation".

The 2015 consultation, dealing specifically with "station locations, entrances and exits", included a commitment to reduce the footprint of the proposed station, so that it would no longer require the destruction of Chelsea Fire Station and Dovehouse Green, with the proposed station moved onto a smaller nearby plot occupied by Chelsea Farmers' Market.

In 2016, Transport for London (TfL) and National Rail identified the King’s Road site as the "stronger" proposal for a station in Chelsea. The Chelsea West station site was dropped because it had been less popular with the public and "would be further away from the retail and commercial activity along King’s Road." At the same time, it was noted that a tunnel alignment bypassing Chelsea and connecting Clapham Junction and Victoria directly would reduce construction costs and journey times, but would not ameliorate congestion on the King's Road or satisfy future transport demand.

At the same time a station at Imperial Wharf was also considered, but it was found that alignment would require an extra 1km of tunnelling at greater costs and with greater construction difficulties, would "lengthen the journey time between Clapham Junction and Victoria station by 2 minutes" and "would also require a ventilation shaft in the King’s Road area" It was also noted that a tunnel alignment bypassing Chelsea and connecting Clapham Junction and Victoria directly would reduce costs and journey times, but would not ameliorate the current and future projected congestion of the King's Road.

The press reported that the station did not appear in TfL's business case documentation of March 2017, suggesting that it may be scrapped. In May 2018, the railway promoters reported that "the benefit and disbenefits" of bypassing Chelsea with a more direct tunnelling alignment between Clapham Junction and Victoria" were being considered, but "no decisions have yet been made". In October 2020, any "further work on the design and development of Crossrail 2" was paused, with the entire project suspended as a result of the financial impact of the Covid pandemic on the finances of TfL

== Public opinion ==
A 2013 survey by Kensington and Chelsea Borough Council with 2,950 respondents found that "seven in ten" supported the introduction of the line with a station in Chelsea, with 33% supporting the King's Road station location and 30% preferring "a location further west".

In the 2014 consultation, 4,008 respondents expressed views on the location of the station in Chelsea:

- 32% supported the King’s Road location;
- 27% opposed Crossrail 2 not stopping in the Chelsea area;
- 26% opposed the Chelsea West location;
- 24% supported Crossrail 2 not stopping in the Chelsea area; and
- 21% respondents supported the Chelsea West location.

The 2015 consultation saw 9,839 respondent answer a question about King’s Road Chelsea, with negative observations outnumbering supportive comments.

== Services ==
Future Development
Preceding station	Crossrail	Following station
Clapham Junction towards Hampton Court, Shepperton, Chessington South or Epsom	Crossrail 2	Victoria towards New Southgate or Broxbourne
