= London Buses route 12 =

London bus route

12
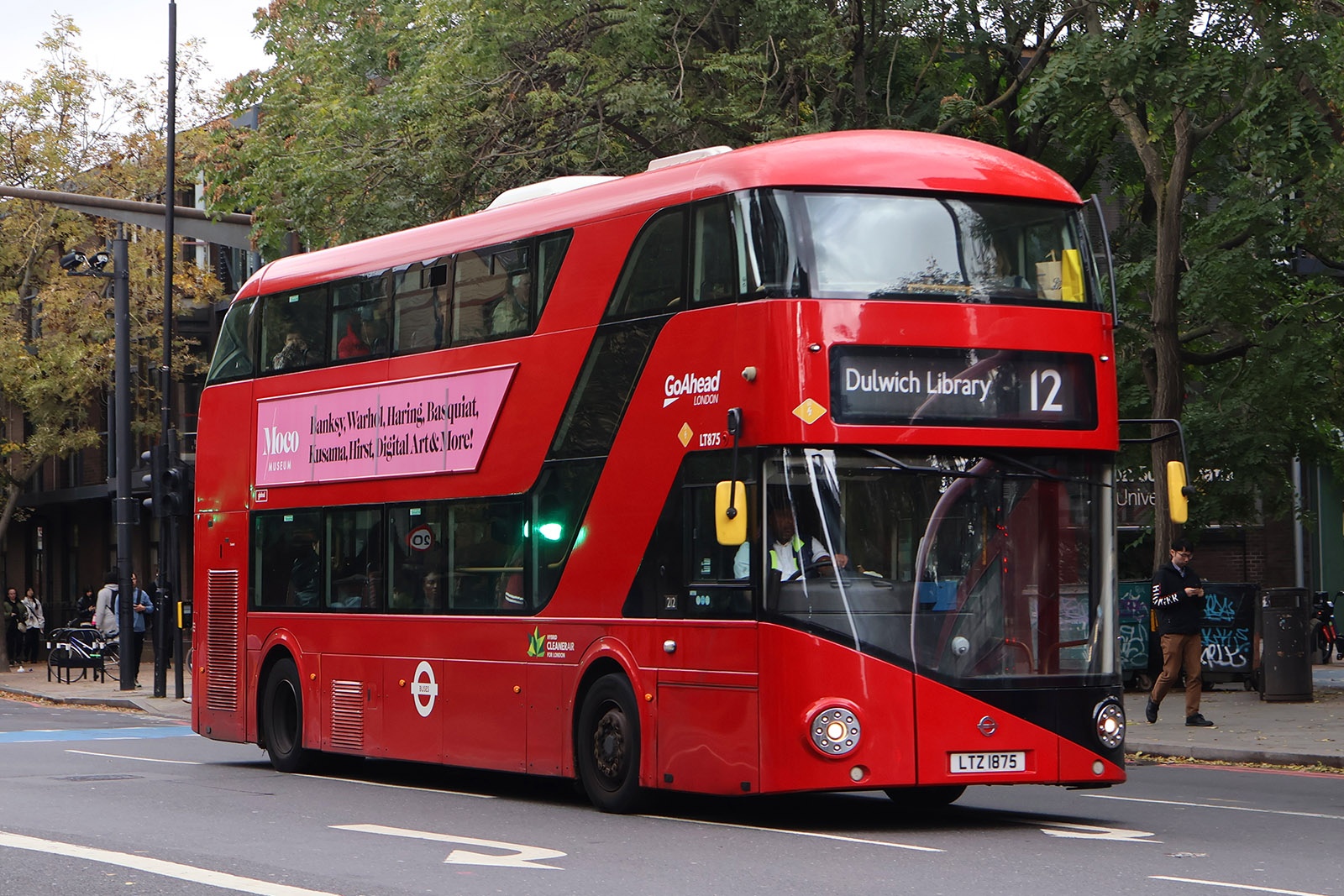
- London Central New Routemaster in Elephant and Castle in October 2025

Overview
- Operator: London Central (Go-Ahead London)
- Garage: Camberwell
- Vehicle: New Routemaster
- Peak vehicle requirement: Day: 15; Night: 7
- Night-time: 24-hour service

Route
- Start: Oxford Circus station
- Via: Piccadilly Circus; Trafalgar Square; Westminster; Lambeth North; Elephant and Castle; Camberwell; Peckham
- End: Dulwich Library
- Length: 7 miles (11 km)

Service
- Level: 24-hour service
- Frequency: About every 5-6 minutes
- Journey time: 38-65 minutes
- Operates: 24-hour service

London Buses route 12 is a Transport for London contracted bus route in London, England. Running between Oxford Circus station and Dulwich Library, it is operated by Go-Ahead London subsidiary London Central.

== History ==
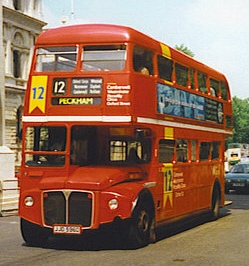
London Central AEC Routemaster on Whitehall in July 1997

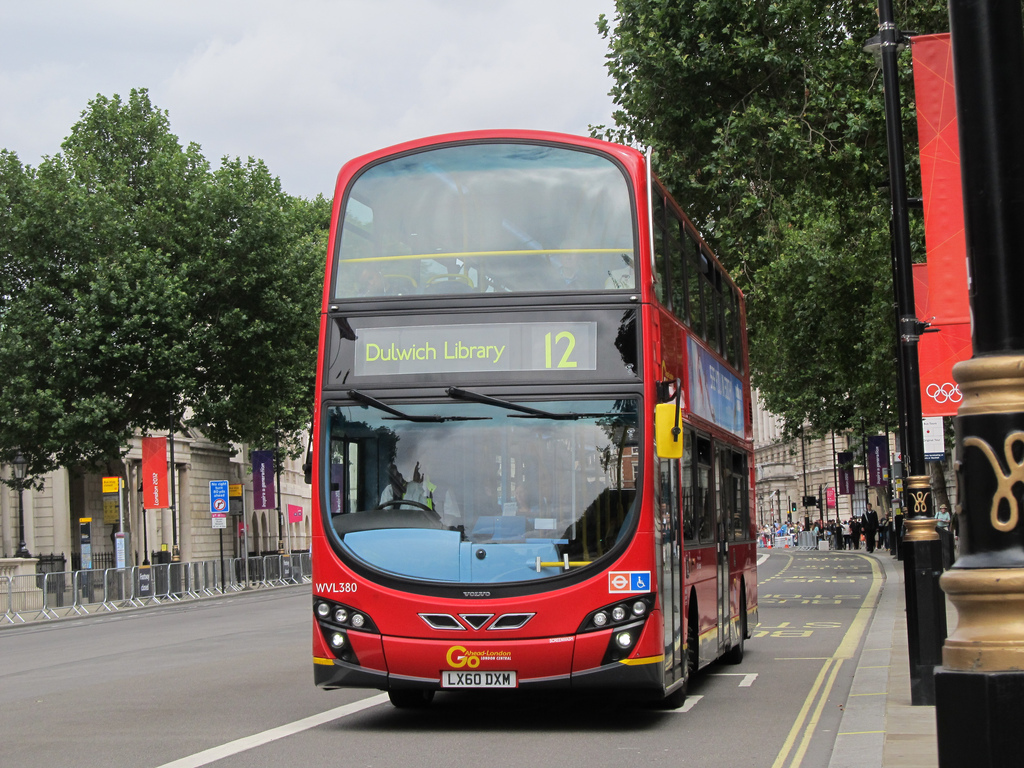
Go-Ahead London Wright Eclipse Gemini 2 bodied Volvo B9TL on Whitehall in July 2012

The route is one of the oldest in London, going back to at least 1851, along with the routes 9 and 11. In February 1907, the first bus produced by British Automobile Development Co. and Brush Electrical Engineering Co. Ltd. went into service on this route. Tilling-Stevens petrol electric buses were used on route 12, running between Oxford Circus and Peckham. In the 1930s destinations between South Croydon and Brent Cross station were served. By the 1950s, the route operated between South Croydon and Willesden Junction, although buses from Croydon generally ran no further than Oxford Circus and those from Harlesden no further than Dulwich.

The route has been run from a number of garages. The computer scheduling system developed by London Buses in the 1970s is designed for a maximum of four garages operating on any one route; this was derived from route 12, which had four garages operating vehicles on it at the time. During the annual Notting Hill Carnival express services operated as 12X.

Route 12 was shortened to terminate at Norwood Junction in 1972, with new route 12A (later 312 and now 197) taking over between South Croydon and Peckham. On 25 October 1986, the route was reduced to operate only between Penge and East Acton. From 14 August 1988, route 12 was curtailed south of Dulwich Library, capacity being maintained by extending route 78 from Dulwich to Forest Hill and route 176 from Forest Hill to Penge. The western terminal was cut back to Shepherd's Bush on 13 July 1991 and to Notting Hill Gate on 12 March 1994.

The route was operated by AEC Regent III RTs until replaced by AEC Routemasters in 1973.

The route was restructured on 5 November 2004, with the section between Oxford Circus and Notting Hill Gate withdrawn, with route 390 extended. At the same time the Routemasters were replaced by Mercedes-Benz O530G articulated buses.

Free WiFi and passenger information screens were introduced in August 2014 on two buses as part of a trial by Transport for London.

Wright Eclipse Gemini 2 bodied Volvo B9TL and Wright Eclipse Gemini 2 bodied Volvo B5LH double deck buses were introduced on 24 November 2011 as part of the Mayor of London's policy to withdraw articulated buses from London.

London Central successfully retained route 12 with new contracts starting on 6 November 2004 and 5 December 2011 (now as Go-Ahead London).

New Routemasters were introduced on 28 March 2015. The rear platform remains closed at all times except for when the bus is at bus stops.

== Current route ==
Route 12 operates via these primary locations:

- Oxford Circus station
- Piccadilly Circus
- Trafalgar Square
- Westminster station
- St Thomas' Hospital
- Lambeth North station
- Elephant & Castle station
- Walworth
- Camberwell Green
- Peckham High Street
- Peckham Rye station
- Dulwich Library

== Cultural significance ==
The route passes a number of tourist attractions and landmarks and has been suggested as part of a cheaper alternative to formal bus tours of London.

- Between the stops by Sandi Toksvig is sub-titled The view of My Life from the top of The Number 12 Bus.
