= London Buses route 9 =

London bus route

9
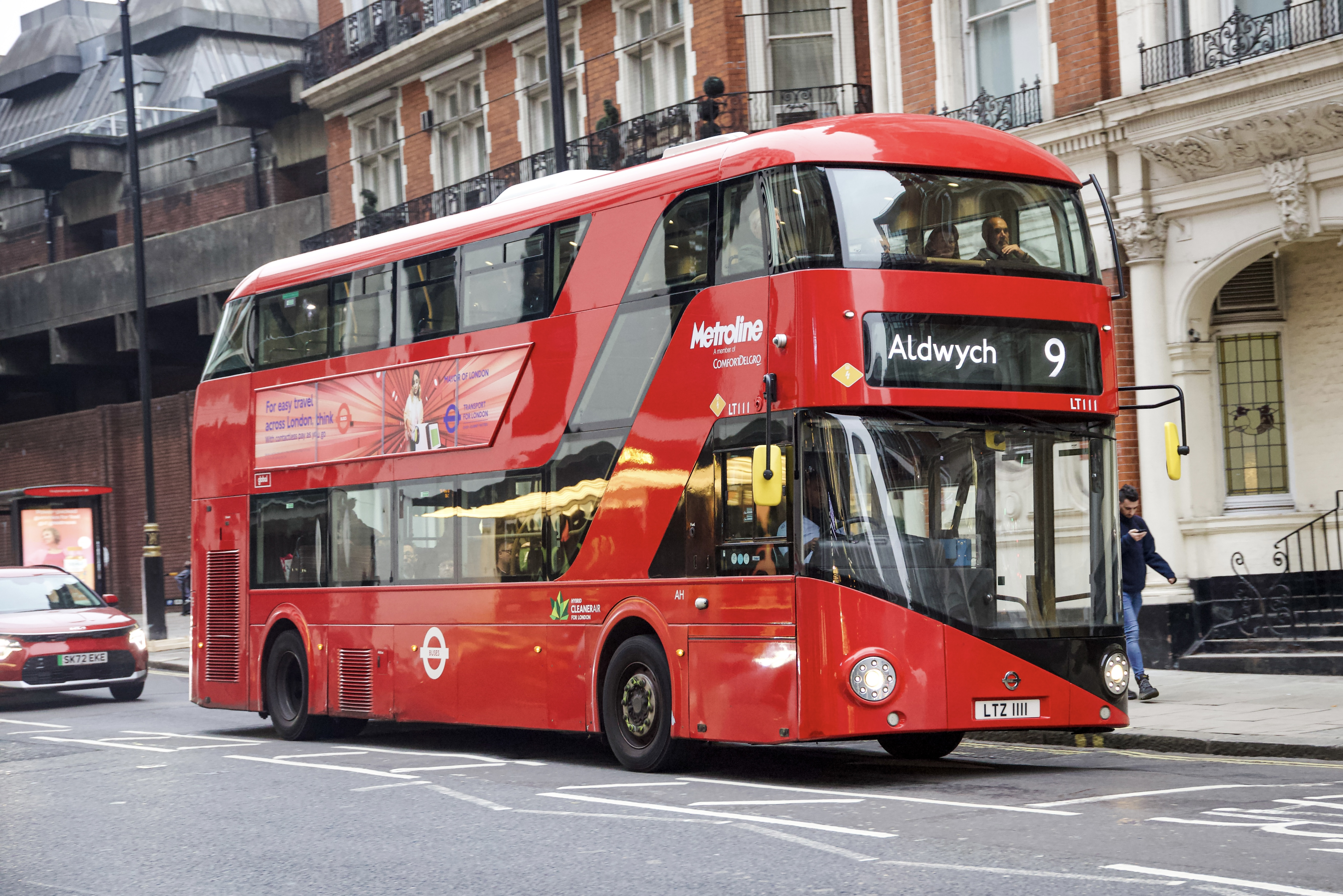
- Metroline New Routemaster at Knightsbridge station in November 2024

Overview
- Operator: Metroline
- Garage: Brentford
- Vehicle: New Routemaster
- Peak vehicle requirement: 14
- Night-time: N9

Route
- Start: Aldwych
- Via: Trafalgar Square; Piccadilly Circus; Hyde Park Corner; Kensington
- End: Hammersmith bus station

London Buses route 9 is a Transport for London contracted bus route in London, England. Running between Aldwych and Hammersmith bus station, it is operated by Metroline.

== History ==
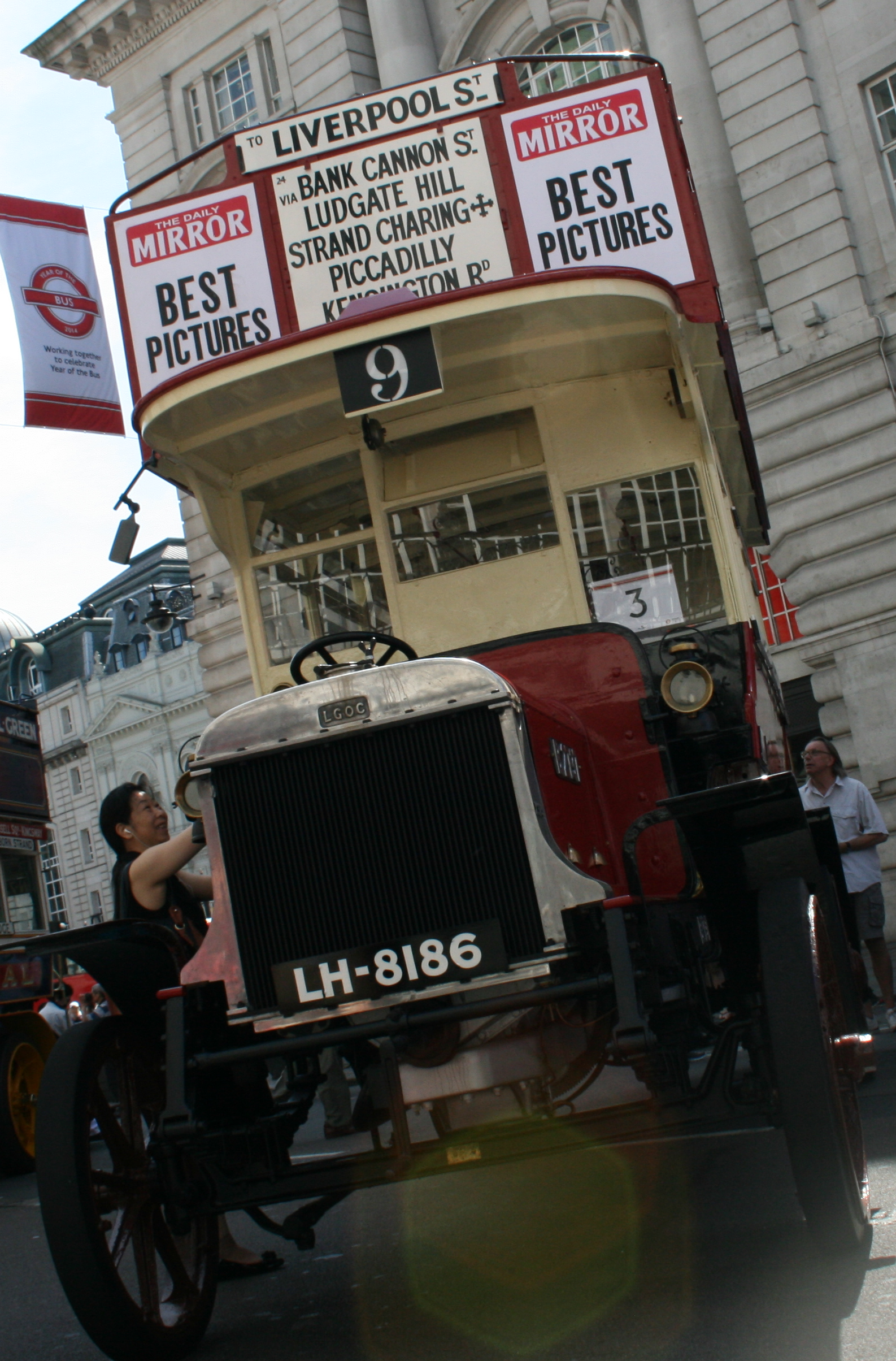
Restored LGOC B-type bus in June 2014

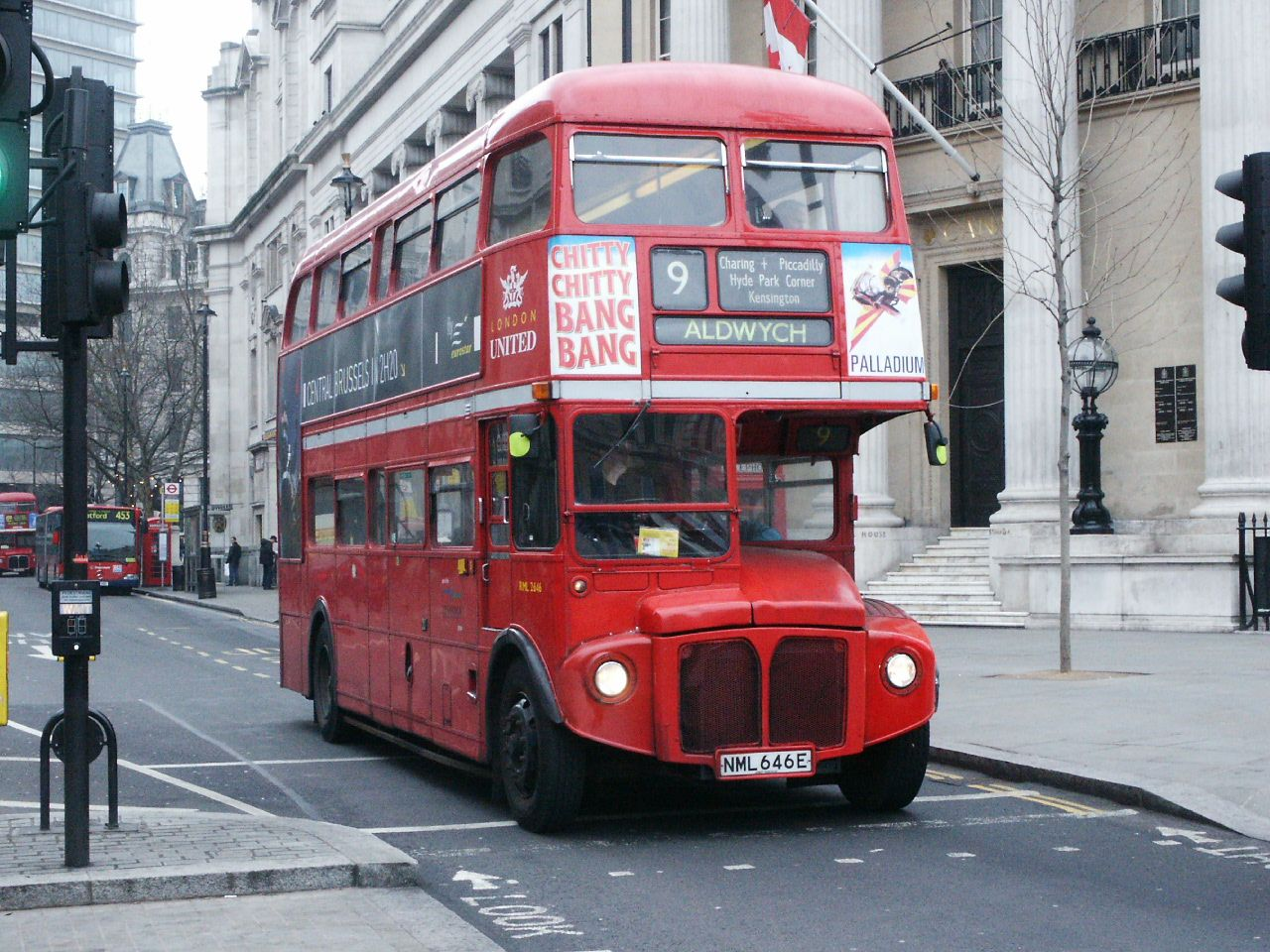
London United AEC Routemaster on Cockspur Street in March 2004

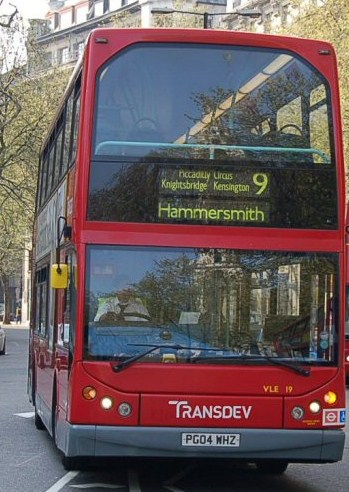
Transdev London East Lancs Myllennium Vyking bodied Volvo B7TL in April 2007

Route 9 has been called "London's oldest existing bus route". Its origin goes as far back as 1851, although the routes 11 and 12 also date from this time.

The Sunday 9 extension was finally removed when route 23 gained a Sunday service in the late 1960s, although a token service was maintained as far as Aldgate until 14:00 on Sundays to serve the local markets, the afternoon service being curtailed at Aldwych. The Saturday service was also curtailed to Aldwych a few years later, but the Sunday service was renumbered 9A to avoid the unusual bifurcation, being further diverted via Monument and Tower Hill instead of Bank and Leadenhall Street. This variation had been dropped completely by 1990, and the route thus then ran daily from Mortlake to Aldwych with a Monday to Friday extension to Liverpool Street. The whole route was cut back to Aldwych on 18 July 1992, the replacement to Liverpool Street being new route 23.

In 1976 the route was the subject of a British Transport Films documentary The Nine Road.

In the lead up to the introduction of the London congestion charge in February 2003, service levels were increased with MCW Metrobuses drafted in to supplement the AEC Routemasters. On 4 September 2004, crewed operation finished with the AEC Routemasters replaced by East Lancs Myllennium Vyking bodied Volvo B7TL and the route was transferred to Stamford Brook garage, in an economy swap with route 49.

In 2014, the route briefly operated a New Routemaster painted in red and silver livery to promote the Year of the Bus.

To mark the First World War centenary, the London Transport Museum restored one of only four surviving LGOC B-type buses. The bus being restored used to run on route 9 between Barnes and Liverpool Street from 1914. The restoration cost £250,000, with more than half being spent sourcing original parts.

New Routemasters were introduced on 26 October 2013. The rear platform remains open from Monday to Friday between 06:00 and 18:00 when it is staffed by a customer assistant. In September 2016, conductors were removed from buses on route 9 and buses now operate with drivers only and the rear platform closed.

On 15 June 2019, the route was re-routed via Piccadilly Circus. In 2021, the frequency of the service was reduced from 8 buses per hour to 6 Monday to Saturday daytimes, and from 6 buses per hour to 5 during evenings and on Sundays.

== Current route ==
Route 9 operates via these primary locations:

- Aldwych Bush House
- Charing Cross station
- Trafalgar Square
- Piccadilly Circus
- Green Park station
- Hyde Park Corner
- Knightsbridge station
- Royal Albert Hall
- High Street Kensington station
- Kensington High Street
- Kensington (Olympia) station
- Hammersmith bus station

In 1978, route 9 was called the "very best and least expensive tour of London" as it passed Hyde Park, Hyde Park Corner, Green Park, Burlington Arcade, Piccadilly Circus, Haymarket, Trafalgar Square, the National Gallery, Strand, Savoy Hotel, Simpsons of Piccadilly, Fleet Street, Lombard Street and George and Vulture. The current route passes Kensington Palace and Kensington Gardens. It also passes the Design Museum, Royal Albert Hall, Albert Memorial, Wellington Arch, Apsley House, New Zealand War Memorial, The Athenaeum Hotel, The Ritz London Hotel, The Wolseley, St James's Palace, National Gallery, Duke of York Column, Nelson's Column, Eleanor cross, Savoy Hotel, Savoy Theatre and Somerset House.
