= Night buses in London =

Series of night bus routes that serve Greater London

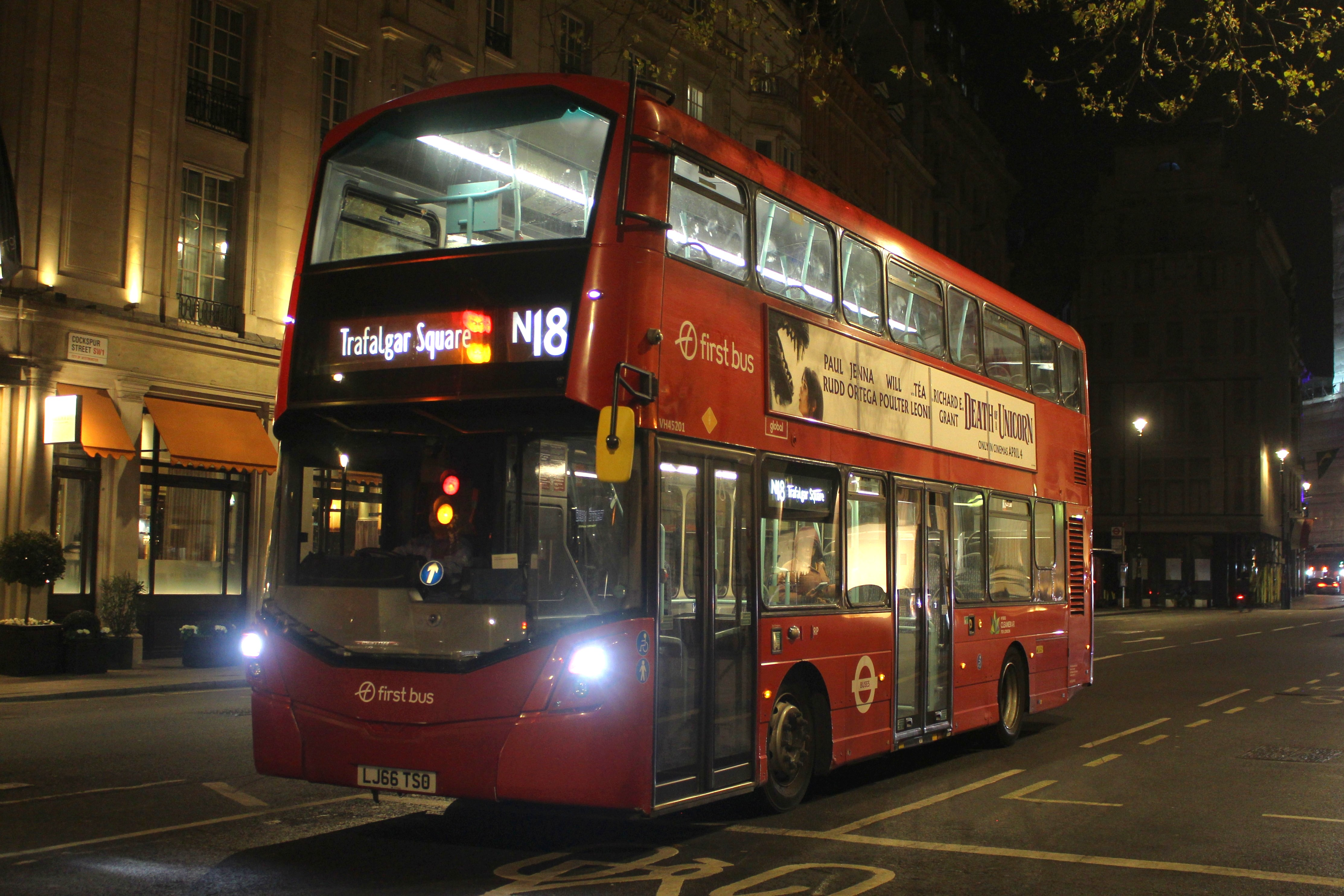
London United Wright Gemini 3 bodied Volvo B5LH on route N18 in April 2025

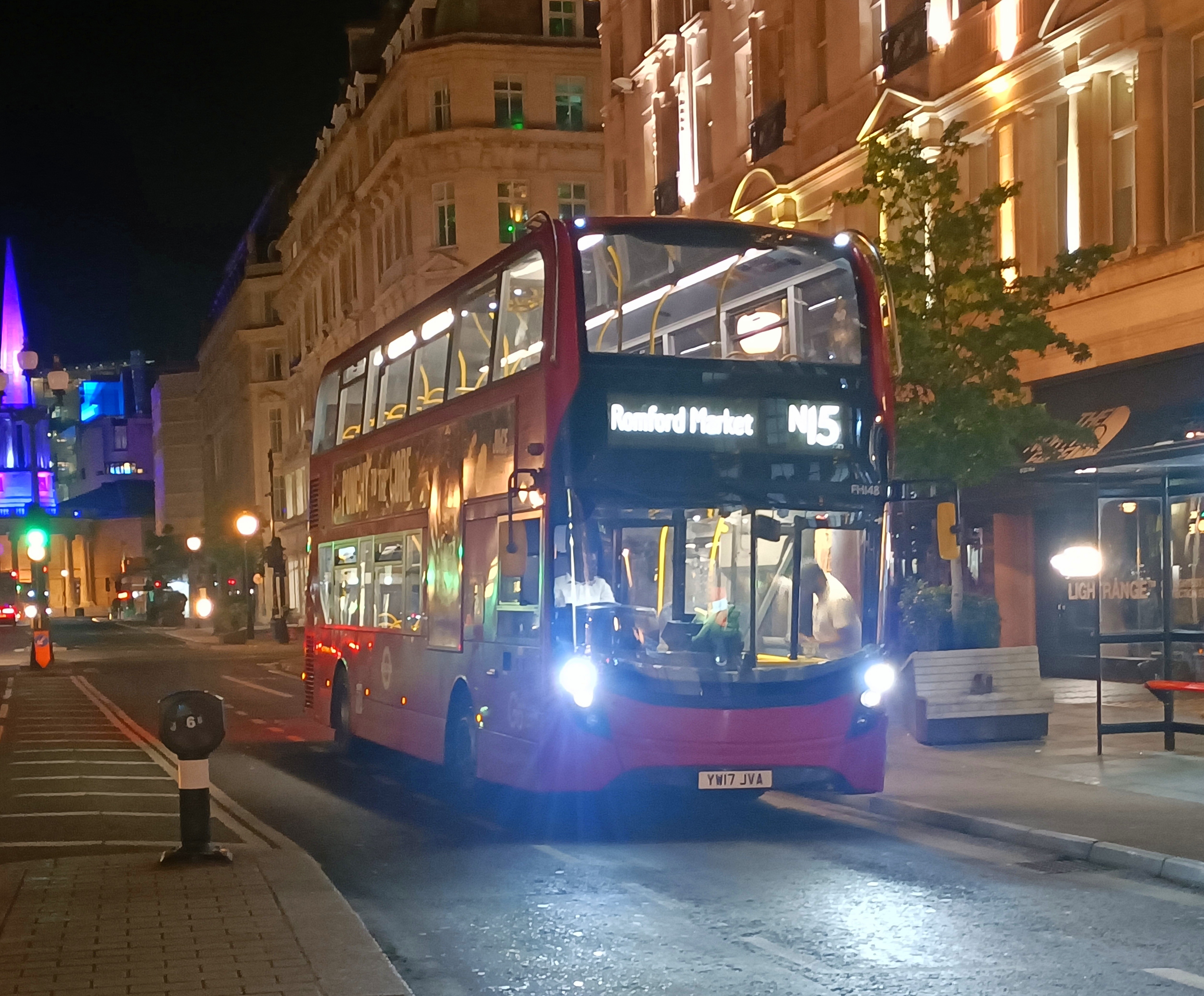
Blue Triangle Alexander Dennis Enviro400H MMC on route N15 at Oxford Circus in July 2025

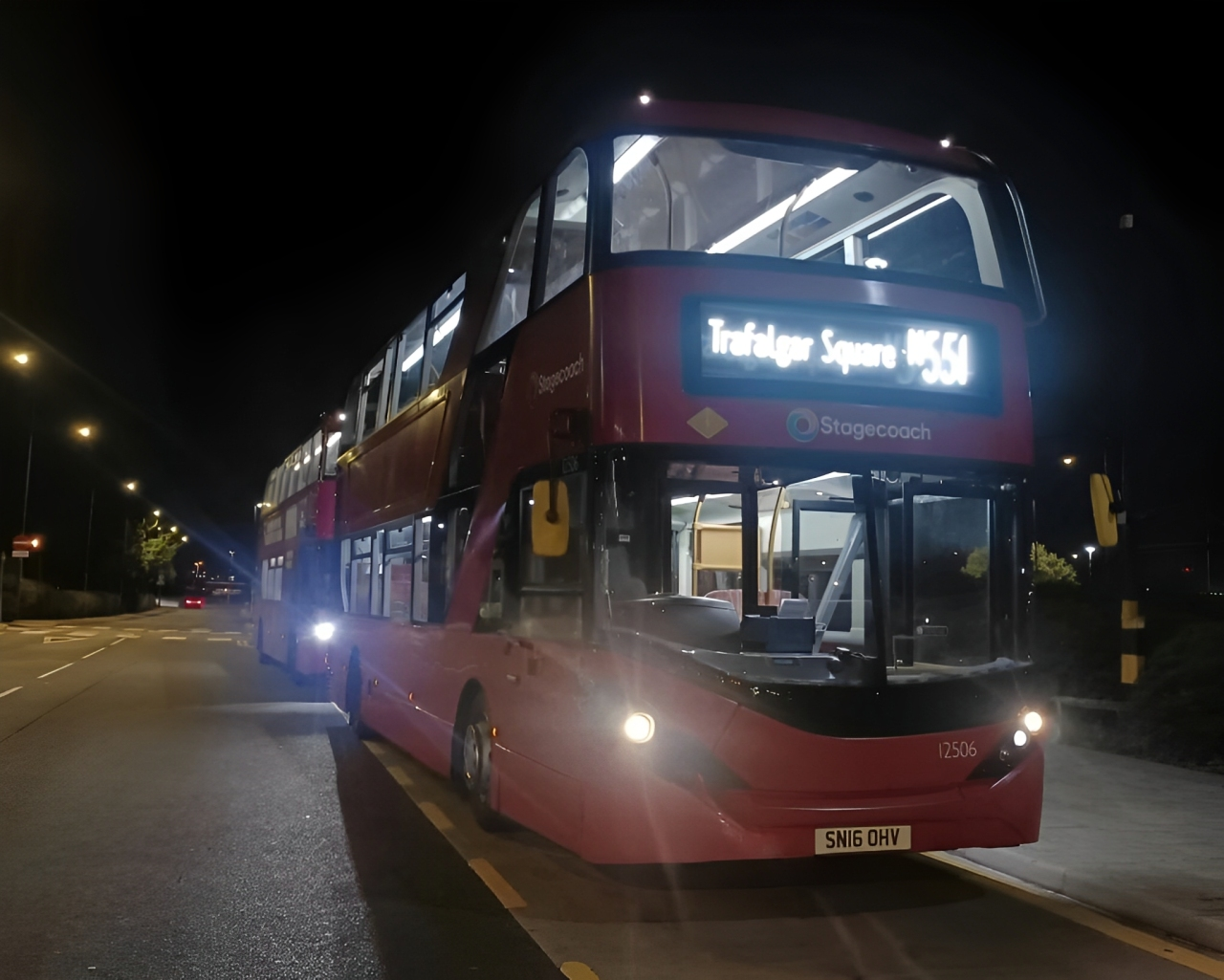
East London Alexander Dennis Enviro400H City on route N551 at Gallions Reach Shopping Park in July 2025

The London Night Bus network is a series of night bus routes that serve Greater London. Services broadly operate between the hours of 23:00 and 06:00.

Many services commence from or operate via Trafalgar Square and are extensions or variations of daytime routes and hence derive their number from these; for example, route N73 from Oxford Circus to Walthamstow Central follows that of route 73 as far as Stoke Newington, before continuing further north.

== History ==
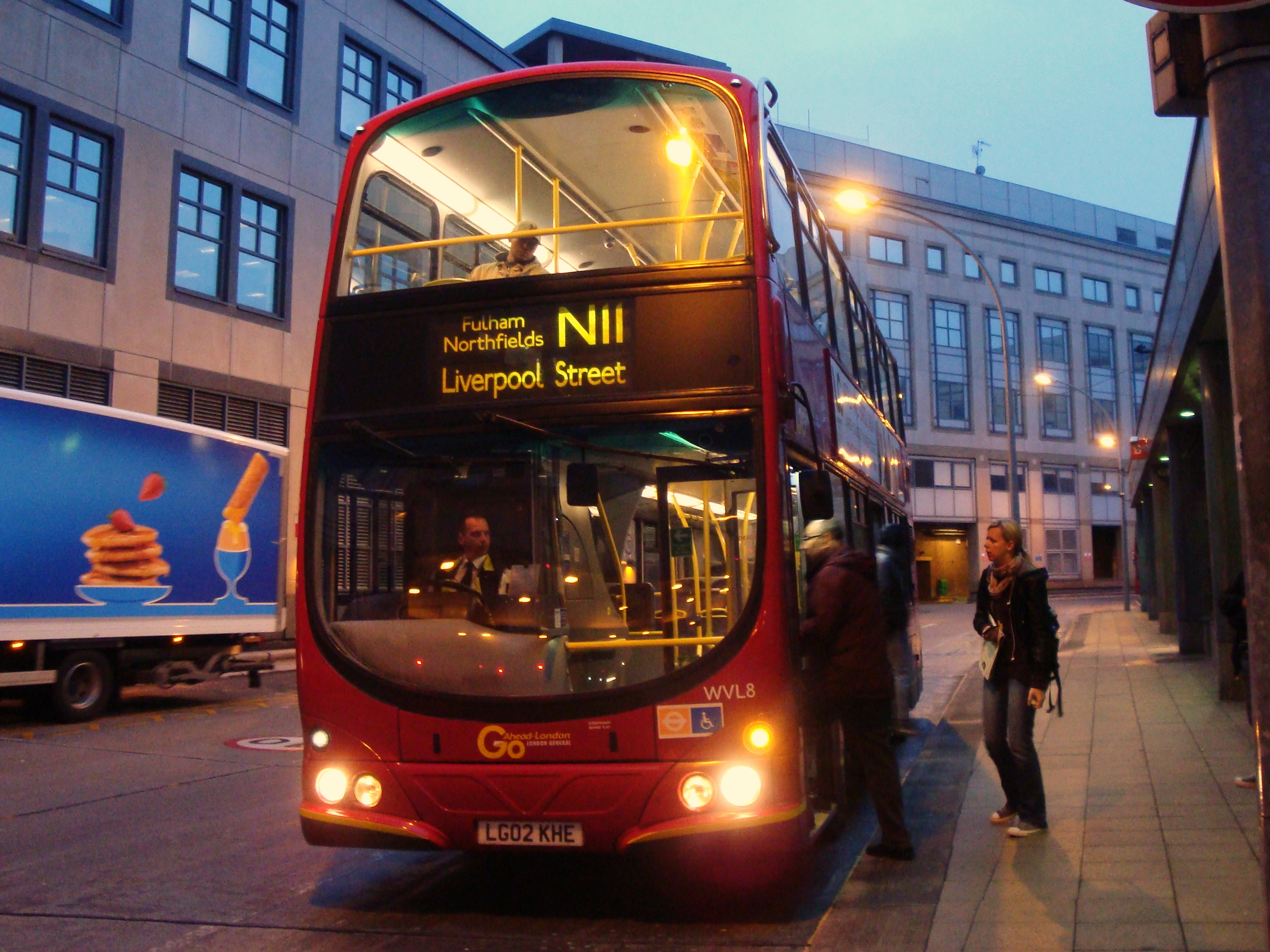
London General Wright Eclipse Gemini bodied Volvo B7TL on route N11 in July 2014

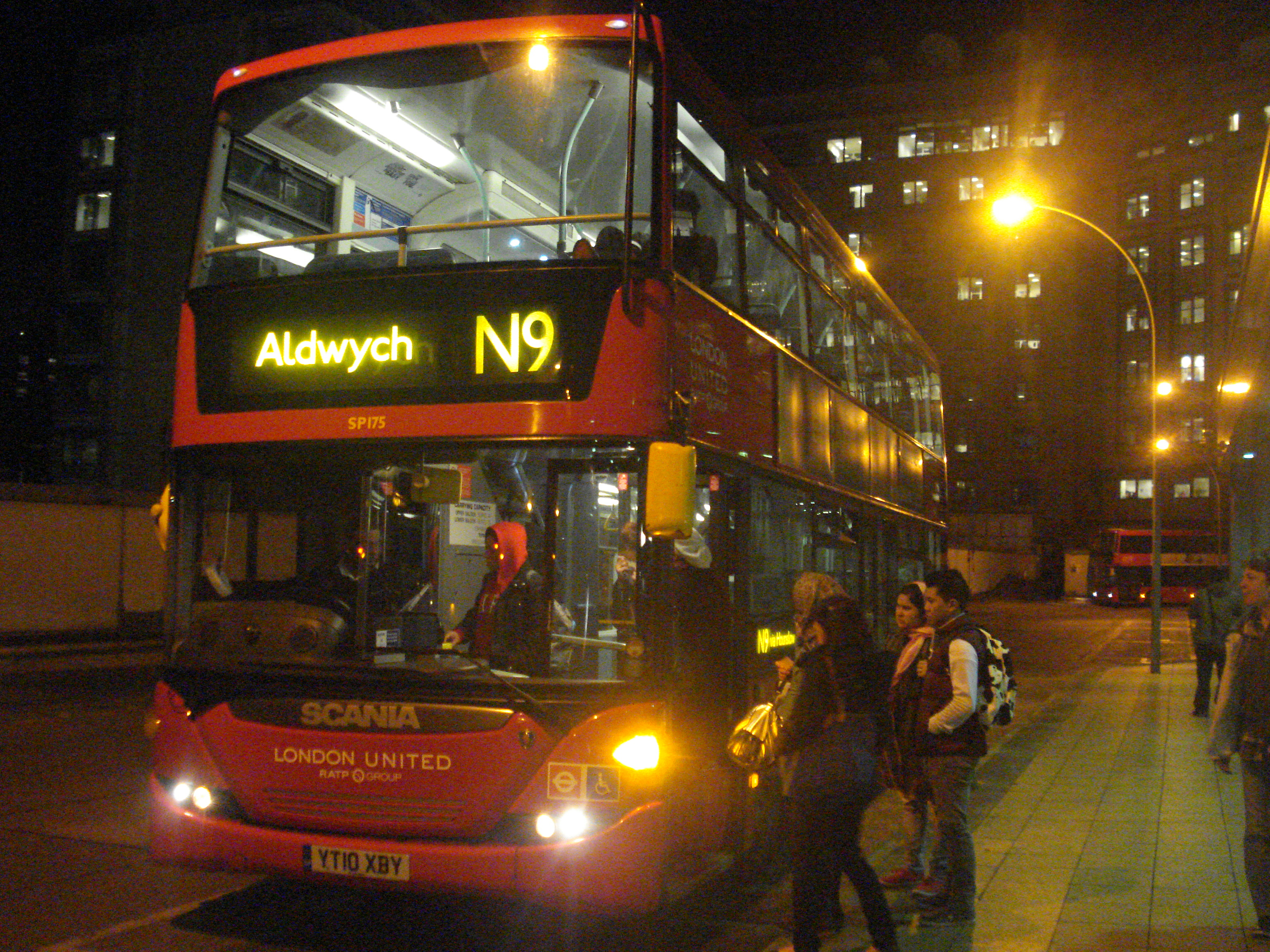
London United Scania OmniCity on route N9 in October 2013

The first night bus was introduced in 1913. By 1920 there were two 'All Night Bus Services' in operation named the 94 and 94a running from 23:30 to 05:30. A few more services were introduced over the following decades, but all ceased during World War II. Services resumed after the war, increasing as trams and trolleybuses were replaced in the late 1950s and 1960s. In 1978 London Transport listed 21 all-night bus routes. On many of these routes, "all-night" service meant a departure frequency of no more than one bus an hour. In April 1984, the number of routes was increased from 21 to 32. At this point the peak service required 80 buses; by August 2013 this had grown to 890.

Originally the night bus network had its own fare structure, but with the introduction of the Oyster card in 2003, it was incorporated into the Transport for London fare structure. Until the mid-2000s, all routes had N prefixes. However, as some routes merely mirrored their day time equivalents, the N prefixes were dropped and these routes became 24-hour services; for example, route N14 was no longer differentiated from route 14.

Services are operated by private operators under contract to London Buses. The Night Bus contracts are often bundled with those of the equivalent daytime routes and awarded for a five-year period, with an optional two-year extension based on performance standards being met. Some however are tendered individually.

With some London Underground lines operating a 24-hour service at weekends from August 2016, a further eight routes commenced 24-hour operation on Friday and Saturday nights. Further changes were made as the Night Tube network expanded.

In May 2015, the Night Bus network was the subject of The Night Bus, a Channel 4 documentary.

== Operation ==
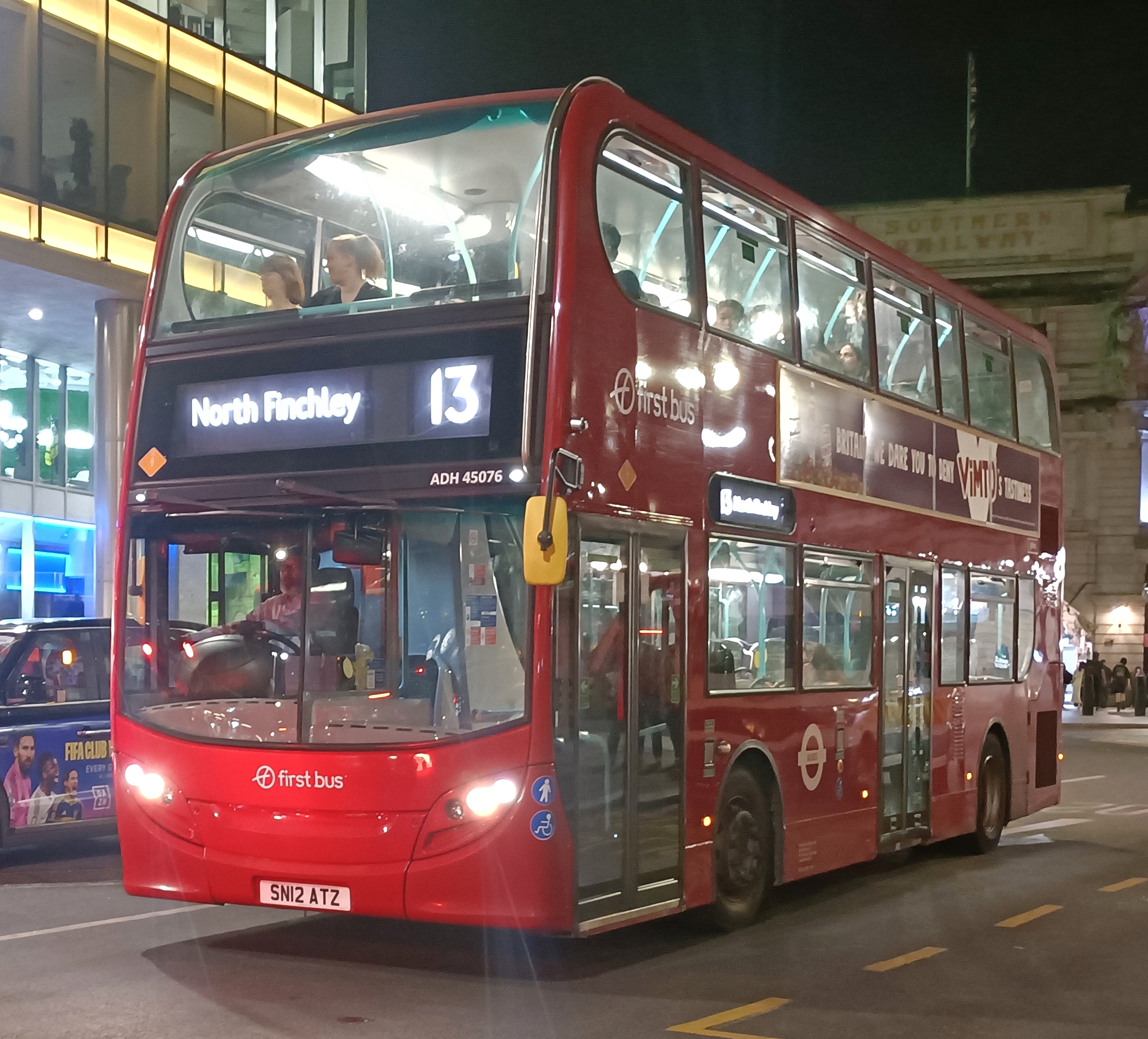
London Transit Alexander Dennis Enviro400H on route 13 in Victoria in July 2025, being one of the 24-hour routes

Night Bus routes are often related to the day numerical equivalent, normally running the same route but with an extension at either end of the service. This is normally to provide a night service to destinations served by tube or train during the day. Some N-prefixed routes may begin operation before the last service of their day numerical equivalent for the day.

However, there are a few N-prefixed route numbers that have no relation to their daytime equivalents: the N5, N20, and N97 all operate in a different part of London to their respective day routes. Also, the N118 (which runs partially alongside route N18), N472 (whose daytime service was withdrawn in January 2026), N550 and N551 (which provide night service on parts of the DLR network) have no corresponding daytime routes.

There are also 24-hour routes, which run day and night but usually with a lower frequency during the night hours. The vast majority run the same route at all times. With the introduction of the Night Tube, some day routes have been extended to run during Friday and Saturday nights to serve the stations.

Route	Start	End	Operator
N1	Thamesmead	Tottenham Court Road station	Go-Ahead London
N2	Crystal Palace bus station	Marylebone station	Arriva London
N3	Oxford Circus tube station	Bromley North railway station	Transport UK London Bus
N5	Edgware bus station	Trafalgar Square	First Bus London
N7	Northolt tube station	Marble Arch tube station	Metroline
N8	Hainault	Oxford Circus tube station	Stagecoach London
N9	Heathrow Terminal 5	Aldwych	Metroline
N11	Ealing Broadway station	Whitehall	Go-Ahead London
N15	Oxford Circus tube station	Romford Market	Go-Ahead London
N18	Harrow Weald bus garage	Trafalgar Square	First Bus London
N19	Clapham Junction railway station	Finsbury Park bus station	Arriva London
N20	Barnet Hospital	Trafalgar Square	Metroline
N21	Trafalgar Square	Bexleyheath town centre	Go-Ahead London
N22	Oxford Circus tube station	Fulwell	Go-Ahead London
N25	Ilford	Oxford Circus tube station	Stagecoach London
N26	Chingford railway station	London Victoria station	Stagecoach London
N27	Camden Market	Hammersmith bus station	Transport UK London Bus
N28	Southside Wandsworth	Camden Town tube station	Metroline
N29	Enfield Town	Trafalgar Square	Arriva London
N31	Clapham Junction railway station	Camden Town tube station	First Bus London
N32	Edgware bus station	London Victoria station	Metroline
N33	Fulwell railway station	Hammersmith bus station	First Bus London
N38	Walthamstow bus station	Victoria bus station	Arriva London
N41	Tottenham Hale bus station	Trafalgar Square	Arriva London
N44	Sutton railway station	Aldwych	Go-Ahead London
N53	Whitehall	Plumstead railway station	Stagecoach London
N55	St Thomas of Canterbury Church	Oxford Circus tube station	Stagecoach London
N63	Crystal Palace	London King's Cross railway station	Transport UK London Bus
N65	Chessington World of Adventures	Ealing Broadway station	First Bus London
N68	Old Coulsdon	Tottenham Court Road	Transport UK London Bus
N72	East Acton	Roehampton	First Bus London
N73	Walthamstow bus station	Oxford Circus tube station	Arriva London
N74	Roehampton	Baker Street tube station	Go-Ahead London
N83	Ealing Hospital	Golders Green tube station	Metroline
N86	Harold Hill	Stratford bus station	Stagecoach London
N87	Fairfield bus station	Aldwych	Go-Ahead London
N89	Trafalgar Square	Erith	Go-Ahead London
N91	Cockfosters tube station	Trafalgar Square	Go-Ahead London
N97	Hammersmith bus station	Trafalgar Square	Go-Ahead London
N98	Stanmore tube station	Red Lion Square	Metroline
N109	Oxford Circus tube station	Croydon town centre	Transport UK London Bus
N113	Edgware bus station	Marble Arch tube station	Metroline
N118	Ruislip tube station	Trafalgar Square	First Bus London
N133	Morden tube station	Liverpool Street bus station	Transport UK London Bus
N136	Oxford Circus tube station	Chislehurst	Go-Ahead London
N137	Crystal Palace bus station	Marble Arch tube station	Arriva London
N140	Harrow Weald bus garage	Heathrow Central bus station	Metroline
N155	Morden tube station	Aldwych	Go-Ahead London
N171	Hither Green railway station	Tottenham Court Road station	Go-Ahead London
N199	St Mary Cray railway station	Trafalgar Square	Stagecoach London
N205	Leyton	London Paddington station	Stagecoach London
N207	Uxbridge tube station	Bloomsbury Square	Transport UK London Bus
N242	Homerton University Hospital	Tottenham Court Road	Stagecoach London
N250	Fairfield Halls	Brixton tube station	Arriva London
N253	Tottenham Court Road station	Aldgate tube station	Arriva London
N263	North Finchley bus station	Finsbury Square	Metroline
N266	Brent Cross bus station	Hammersmith bus station	Metroline
N277	Cubitt Town	Islington	Stagecoach London
N279	Waltham Cross	Trafalgar Square	Arriva London
N343	New Cross bus garage	Trafalgar Square	Go-Ahead London
N381	Peckham	Whitehall	Transport UK London Bus
N472	North Greenwich bus station	Abbey Wood railway station	Go-Ahead London
N550	Canning Town bus station	Trafalgar Square	Stagecoach London
N551	Gallions Reach Shopping Park	Trafalgar Square	Stagecoach London

== N1 ==
Route N1 commenced operating on 28 June 1995 between Plumstead garage and Trafalgar Square. It was originally operated by London Central, being taken over by First London on 14 November 1998. On 8 January 2000 it was extended beyond Plumstead to Thamesmead, and in April 2000 withdrawn between Trafalgar Square and Aldwych being diverted to Tottenham Court Road station. Upon being re-tendered, the route was taken over by East Thames Buses on 15 October 2005.

In October 2009, East Thames Buses was sold to Go-Ahead London, which included a five-year contract to operate route N1.

Current route

Route N1 operates via these primary locations:

- Thamesmead
- Abbey Wood station
- Plumstead station
- Woolwich Arsenal station
- Charlton station
- Cutty Sark for Maritime Greenwich station
- Deptford
- Surrey Quays station
- South Bermondsey station
- Elephant & Castle station
- Waterloo station
- Aldwych
- Holborn station
- Tottenham Court Road station

== N2 ==
Route N2 commenced operating on 13 April 1984 between West Norwood station and Trafalgar Square. In October 1984, it was extended north from Trafalgar Square to Friern Barnet and south from West Norwood station to Crystal Palace bus station. In June 1995, it was withdrawn between Camden Town and Friern Barnet, and rerouted to Hampstead Heath. In November 1999, the Trafalgar Square to Hampstead Heath section was withdrawn and replaced by route N24. Upon being re-tendered, it passed from Metroline to Arriva London in April 2000.

Current route

Route N2 operates via these primary locations:

- Crystal Palace bus station
- West Norwood station
- Tulse Hill station
- Brixton station
- Stockwell station
- Vauxhall bus station
- Pimlico station
- Victoria station
- Hyde Park Corner station
- Marble Arch
- Marylebone station

== N3 ==
Route N3 began operating on 27 October 1989 between Beckenham Junction station and Victoria bus station via Oxford Circus. In October 1993, it was extended to start back at Chislehurst. In May 2000, it was altered to operate between Bromley North station and Oxford Circus. Its operation passed from London Central to Connex on the same date.

Route N3 was included in the sale of Connex to Travel London in February 2004 which in turn was sold to Abellio London in May 2009. New Routemasters commenced operating route N3 on 8 February 2016.

Current route

Route N3 operates via these primary locations:

- Oxford Circus station
- Regent Street
- Piccadilly Circus station
- Trafalgar Square For Charing Cross tube station
- Whitehall
- Westminster station
- Horseferry Road For Parliament Square
- Lambeth Palace For Lambeth Bridge
- Lambeth Road
- Kennington Road For Imperial War Museum
- St Marks Church For Oval station
- Brixton Road
- Brixton station
- Lambeth Town Hall
- Brockwell Lido
- Herne Hill station
- Brockwell Park
- Dulwich Wood
- Crystal Palace station
- Anerley station
- Penge Pawleyne Arms
- Kent House station
- Beckenham Road tram stop
- Clock House station
- Beckenham War Memorial
- Bromley South station
- Bromley North station

== N5 ==
Route N5 commenced operating on 28 October 1989 between Edgware station and Victoria bus station. In June 1995, it was withdrawn between Trafalgar Square and Victoria. It was operated by Metroline since its inception until July 2020 when it passed to London Sovereign.

Current route

Route N5 operates via these primary locations:

- Edgware bus station
- Burnt Oak station
- Colindale station
- Hendon station
- Hendon Central station
- Golders Green station
- Hampstead station
- Belsize Park station
- Chalk Farm station
- Camden Town station
- Euston bus station
- Leicester Square station
- Trafalgar Square

== N7 ==
Route N7 commenced operating on 30 August 2003 between Northolt and Russell Square partly replacing route N23. It was initially operated by First London. Upon being re-tendered it passed to Metroline on 23 June 2007 who commenced a further contract on 21 June 2014. In October 2014 it was withdrawn between Oxford Circus station and Russell Square. In October 2026 it was withdrawn between Marble Arch station and Oxford Circus station.

Current route

Route N7 operates via these primary locations:

- Northolt station
- Yeading White Hart Roundabout
- Greenford Broadway
- Ealing Broadway station
- Ealing Common station
- Acton Central station
- East Acton station
- Hammersmith Hospital
- Ladbroke Grove station
- Westbourne Grove
- Paddington station
- Marble Arch station

== N8 ==
Route N8 commenced operating on 13 August 1988 between Bow Church and Queensbury station. In July 1992, the Marble Arch to Queensbury section was withdrawn, with the route redirected to Victoria bus station. In July 1995, it was altered to operate from Woodford Wells to Trafalgar Square. In June 1999, it once again began operating to Victoria, albeit via Piccadilly Circus. This was altered in April 2000 with it now routed via Berkeley Square. In June 2004, its eastern terminus was altered to Hainault. In June 2009, it was again withdrawn between Oxford Circus and Victoria being replaced by route C2.

Route N8 has been operated by Stagecoach London since its inception. On 28 June 2014, a further contract commenced with New Routemasters.

Current route

Route N8 operates via these primary locations:

- Hainault The Lowe
- Hainault station
- Barkingside
- Gants Hill station
- Redbridge station
- Wanstead station
- Leytonstone bus station
- Leytonstone High Road station
- Maryland station
- Stratford bus station
- Old Ford
- Bethnal Green station
- Shoreditch High Street station
- Liverpool Street station
- Bank station
- St Paul's station
- City Thameslink station
- Chancery Lane station
- Holborn station
- Tottenham Court Road station
- Oxford Circus station

== N9 ==
Route N9 commenced operating on 25 February 1994 between Kingston and Trafalgar Square replacing parts of routes N65 and N97. In March 1997 it was extended from Trafalgar Square to Aldwych. On 29 September 2001, the Hammersmith bus station to Kingston section was withdrawn and the route diverted to Heathrow Central bus station, as well as the new Heathrow Terminal 5 from 2008. Route N9 has been operated by London United since its inception. On 27 January 2024, this route was transferred to Metroline from their Brentford garage.

Current route

Route N9 operates via these primary locations:

- Heathrow Terminal 5
- Heathrow Central bus station
- Hounslow West station
- West Thames College
- Isleworth station
- Brentford
- Kew Bridge station
- Turnham Green
- Hammersmith bus station
- High Street Kensington station
- Knightsbridge station
- Green Park station
- Trafalgar Square
- Charing Cross station
- Aldwych

== N11 ==
Route N11 commenced operating on 13 April 1984 between Shepherd's Bush Green and Liverpool Street station. In April 1985 it was extended at both ends, westward to Acton Town and east to Hackney Central. It was extended east again in November 1985 to Hackney Wick. In August 1986 it was diverted at the western end from Shepherd's Bush to Turnham Green, this was reversed in February 1994.

Having been replaced between Trafalgar Square and Hackney Wick in October 1989 by route N6, it resumed operating to Liverpool Street in February 1994. In March 2001 it was diverted at Hammersmith to Wembley Stadium. Having been operated by London United since its inception, on 29 June 2003 it was taken over by London General. On 7 June 2008, route N11 was diverted at West Ealing to Ealing Broadway station being replaced by route 297.

On 23 November 2022, it was announced that route N11 would be rerouted to run to Whitehall instead of Shoreditch following a successful consultation. The withdrawn section of the route is now covered by an extended route N26. This change was implemented on 29 April 2023.

Current route

Route N11 operates via these primary locations:

- Ealing Broadway station
- Northfields station
- Acton Town station
- Turnham Green station
- Hammersmith bus station
- Charing Cross Hospital
- Fulham Broadway station
- Sloane Square station
- Victoria station
- Westminster station
- Trafalgar Square
- Charing Cross station
- Whitehall Horse Guards Parade

== N15 ==
Route N15 commenced operating on 15 July 1995 between Becontree Heath and Paddington station to replace a section of withdrawn route N95 between Becontree Heath and Aldgate. In August 1998 the route was extended from Becontree Heath to Romford Market and withdrawn between Marble Arch and Paddington. The latter was reverted in May 2001. In October 2007 the route was extended from Paddington to Paddington Basin. In August 2010 the route was withdrawn between Regent Street and Paddington Basin, this section replaced by route 159. In May 2013 the route was withdrawn between Trafalgar Square and Regent Street.

Having been operated by East London since its inception, it was taken over by Go-Ahead London on 26 August 2017 from their Henley Road bus garage, having part of the allocation run from River Road bus garage and additional services run from Camberwell bus garage.

Current route

Route N15 operates via these primary locations:

- Oxford Circus station
- Piccadilly Circus station
- Trafalgar Square
- Charing Cross station
- City Thameslink station
- St Paul's Cathedral
- Mansion House station
- Cannon Street station
- Monument station
- Aldgate station
- Aldgate East station
- Limehouse station
- Canning Town bus station
- Barking station
- Romford station
- Romford Market

== N18 ==
Route N18 commenced operating on 13 April 1984 between Sudbury and Liverpool Street station. In April 1985 it was extended from Sudbury to Harrow Weald via Edgware at its outer end and curtailed from Liverpool Street to Aldwych at its inner end. Having been operated by First London since privatisation, it was included in the sale of Willesden Junction garage to Metroline in June 2013. In November 2017 operation of the route passed to London United.

Current route

Route N18 operates via these primary locations:

- Harrow Weald bus garage
- Harrow & Wealdstone station
- Harrow-on-the-Hill station
- Northwick Park Hospital
- Sudbury & Harrow Road station
- Wembley Central station
- Stonebridge Park station
- Harlesden Jubilee Clock
- Kensal Green station
- Royal Oak station
- Edgware Road station
- Baker Street station
- Great Portland Street station
- Oxford Circus station
- Piccadilly Circus station
- Trafalgar Square

== N19 ==
Route N19 commenced operating on 28 October 1989 between Clapham Junction station and Finsbury Park station. London General operated it until April 2000 when it was taken over by Arriva London. London General won the route back when re-tendered from March 2012, before it returned to Arriva operation in April 2017.

Current route

Route N19 operates via these primary locations:

- Clapham Junction station
- Battersea Bridge
- Sloane Square station
- Hyde Park Corner station
- Green Park station
- Piccadilly Circus station
- Tottenham Court Road station
- Clerkenwell Road
- Angel station
- Highbury & Islington station
- Finsbury Park station

== N20 ==
Route N20 commenced operating on 28 October 1989 from Chipping Barnet to Aldwych as route N1. It was curtailed from Aldwych to Trafalgar Square on 18 July 1992. It was renumbered as N20 on 24 June 1995. First London operated it from 15 July 1998 until it returned to Metroline on 25 August 2003.

Current route

Route N20 operates via these primary locations:

- Barnet Hospital
- Chipping Barnet
- High Barnet station
- Finchley Central station
- East Finchley station
- Highgate station
- Archway station
- Tufnell Park station
- Kentish Town station
- Camden Town station
- Euston bus station
- Tottenham Court Road station
- Trafalgar Square

== N21 ==
Current route

Route N21 operates via these primary locations:

- Trafalgar Square
- City Thameslink station
- Monument station
- London Bridge station
- Bricklayers Arms
- Old Kent Road
- New Cross Gate station
- Lewisham station
- Lee Green
- Eltham High Street
- Blackfen
- Bexley station
- Bexleyheath Shopping Centre

== N22 ==
Route N22 commenced operating on 24 November 2000 between Richmond and Piccadilly Circus replace the withdrawn section of route N9 between Richmond and Putney Bridge. On 29 September 2001, the route was extended from Richmond to Kingston. On 3 June 2006, it was withdrawn curtailed from Kingston to Fulwell. It has always been operated by London General (now Go-Ahead London). On 16 July 2017, the route was withdrawn between Green Park and Piccadilly Circus and diverted to Oxford Circus via Berkeley Square, partly replacing route C2.

Current route

Route N22 operates via these primary locations:

- Oxford Circus station
- Berkeley Square
- Green Park station
- Piccadilly
- Hyde Park Corner station
- Knightsbridge
- Knightsbridge station
- Sloane Square station
- Chelsea
- Putney Bridge station
- Putney Common
- Barnes Bridge station
- Mortlake
- Richmond station
- Richmond Bridge
- Twickenham
- Fulwell Stanley Road

== N25 ==
Route N25 commenced operation on 15 July 1995 between Romford station and Trafalgar Square. Initially operated by East London, upon being re-tendered it passed to First London on 26 July 1999. It ceased on 26 June 2004, when route 25 was converted to 24-hour operation. Route N25 was reintroduced on 1 December 2018 when route 25 ceased to be a 24-hour route with Tower Transit operating it. Upon being re-tendered, it was taken over by Stagecoach London on 23 May 2020.

Current route

Route N25 operates via these primary locations:

- Ilford
- Little Ilford
- Manor Park
- Woodgrange Park station
- Forest Gate
- Stratford bus station
- Bow Church station
- Bow Road station
- Mile End station
- Stepney Green station
- Whitechapel station
- Aldgate East station
- Aldgate station
- Bank station
- St Paul's station
- City Thameslink station
- Holborn Circus
- Chancery Lane station
- Holborn station
- Tottenham Court Road station
- Oxford Circus station

== N26 ==
Route N26 commenced operation on 18 July 1992 between Walthamstow Central station and Victoria bus station. It was introduced to replace the withdrawn sections of route N6 between Trafalgar Square and Walthamstow. In 1995 it was curtailed from Victoria to Trafalgar Square but extended at the other end to Walthamstow Fulbourne Road. In 2001 it was rerouted from Walthamstow Central to Chingford station, instead of Fulbourne Road, partly replacing route N38.

On 23 November 2022, it was announced that a proposed extension of route N26 to Victoria, in line with a revised (daytime) route 26, would be going ahead following a consultation; it was implemented on 29 April 2023.

Current route

Route N26 operates via these primary locations:

- Chingford station
- Chingford Mount
- Walthamstow bus station
- Leyton Midland Road station
- Hackney Wick
- Hackney Central
- Cambridge Heath station
- Shoreditch High Street
- Liverpool Street station
- Bank station
- Mansion House station
- St Paul's Cathedral
- City Thameslink station
- Trafalgar Square
- Whitehall
- Victoria station

== N27 ==
Route N27 was introduced on 3 February 2001 between Turnham Green and Chalk Farm. It was operated by First London. It ceased on 19 March 2004 when route 27 was converted to 24-hour operation. It resumed on 9 March 2019 when route 27 ceased to be a 24-hour route, this time being operated by London United. On 9 November 2019, it was taken over by Abellio London.

Current route

Route N27 operates via these primary locations:

- Camden Market
- Camden Town station
- Mornington Crescent station
- Great Portland Street
- Regent's Park station
- Baker Street station
- Paddington station
- Notting Hill Gate station
- High Street Kensington station
- Kensington (Olympia) station
- Hammersmith bus station

== N28 ==
Route N28 commenced operating on 29 May 1999 between Camden Town and Southside Wandsworth. On 24 July 2023, the route was diverted via King's Road and Battersea Bridge and terminating at Clapham Junction station from 24 July until 29 July due to Wandsworth Bridge being closed. On 30 July 2023, the route was reinstated to Southside Wandsworth, but diverted via King's Road and Battersea Bridge from 30 July until 2 October, missing stops between New Kings Road and Bridgend Road in both directions due to the closure of Wandsworth Bridge. The route returned to normal running via Wandsworth Bridge when it reopened on 2 October 2023.

Current route

Route N28 operates via these primary locations:

- Southside Wandsworth
- Wandsworth Town station
- Wandsworth Bridge
- Fulham Broadway station
- West Kensington station
- Kensington (Olympia) station
- High Street Kensington station
- Notting Hill Gate station
- Westbourne Park station
- Kilburn Park station
- Kilburn High Road station
- South Hampstead station
- Swiss Cottage station
- Chalk Farm station
- Camden Town station

== N29 ==
Route N29 commenced operating on 27 February 1980 between Enfield Town and Trafalgar Square. On 14 January 2006 it was curtailed from Enfield Town to Ponders End with Mercedes-Benz O530G articulated buses introduced. On 26 November 2011 it was converted back to double deck operation.

Current route

Route N29 operates via these primary locations:

- Enfield Town
- Winchmore Hill
- Palmers Green
- Wood Green station
- Turnpike Lane station
- Harringay Green Lanes station
- Manor House station
- Finsbury Park station
- Camden Road station
- Camden Town station
- Warren Street station
- Tottenham Court Road station
- Trafalgar Square

== N31 ==
Route N31 commenced operation on 11 November 1989 between Camden Town and Notting Hill Gate. It initially operated on Friday and Saturday nights only until it became a seven days a week service on 18 July 1992 with the Alexander bodied Mercedes-Benz 811Ds were replaced by Wright Handybus bodied Dennis Darts that in turn were replaced by Marshall Capital bodied Dennis Darts in 1999.

On 29 May 1999, the route was diverted to terminate at Clapham Junction station. It was converted back to double decker operation in June 2004 with Wright Eclipse Gemini bodied Volvo B7TLs. It was included in the June 2013 sale of First London's Westbourne Park to Tower Transit. Upon being re-tendered, on 28 April 2018 the route passed to Metroline.

Current route

Route N31 operates via these primary locations:

- Clapham Junction station
- Battersea
- Earl's Court station
- High Street Kensington station
- Notting Hill Gate station
- Westbourne Park station
- Kilburn Park station
- Kilburn High Road station
- South Hampstead station
- Swiss Cottage station
- Chalk Farm station
- Camden Town station

== N32 ==
Route N32 commenced operating on 29 April 2023 between Edgware bus station and Victoria station when route N16 was renumbered to route N32 as part of the Central London bus changes.

Current route

Route N32 operates via these primary locations:

- Edgware bus station
- Burnt Oak
- Colindale
- West Hendon
- Staples Corner
- Cricklewood bus garage
- Kilburn station
- Brondesbury station
- Kilburn High Road station
- Maida Vale station
- Edgware Road station
- Marble Arch station
- Hyde Park Corner station
- Victoria station

== N33 ==
Route N33 commenced operating on 18 May 2019 between Fulwell station and Hammersmith bus station with the curtailment of route 33 due to the closure of Hammersmith Bridge.

Current route

Route N33 operates via these primary locations:

- Fulwell station
- Teddington
- Twickenham
- Richmond
- North Sheen
- East Sheen
- Barnes station
- Putney Bridge station
- Fulham High Street
- Charing Cross Hospital
- Hammersmith bus station

== N38 ==
Route N38 commenced operating on 14 July 1995 as a half hourly service between Trafalgar Square and Chingford Mount with hourly bifurcation to Chingford station and Chingford Hatch, replacing most of Route N96. Initially operated by East London, upon being tendered it passed to Arriva London from 19 April 1997, being diverted to Victoria bus station on the same date. On 28 April 2001, the route was curtailed from Chingford to Walthamstow.

Current route

Route N38 operates via these primary locations:

- Walthamstow bus station
- Bakers Arms
- Lea Bridge railway station
- Clapton Pond Lea Bridge Roundabout
- Hackney Central station
- Hackney Downs station
- Dalston Junction station
- Essex Road station
- Angel station
- Tottenham Court Road station
- Green Park station
- Hyde Park Corner station
- Victoria bus station

== N41 ==
Route N41 commenced operation on 9 December 2000 between Tottenham Hale bus station and Archway. On 5 February 2005 it extended from Archway to Trafalgar Square. It has always been operated by Arriva London.

Current route

Route N41 operates via these primary locations:

- Tottenham Hale bus station
- Seven Sisters station
- Turnpike Lane station
- Hornsey station
- Crouch End Broadway
- Hornsey Rise
- Archway station
- Upper Holloway station
- Holloway Road station
- Highbury & Islington station
- Angel station
- Leicester Square station
- Trafalgar Square

== N44 ==
Route N44 commenced operating on 18 August 1995 between Sutton station and Trafalgar Square. On 26 April 1996 it was extended to Aldwych. It has always been operated by London General (now Go-Ahead London).

Current route

Route N44 operates via these primary locations:

- Sutton station
- Mitcham tram stop
- Tooting station
- Tooting Broadway station
- Earlsfield station
- Wandsworth Town station
- Battersea Park station
- Victoria Coach Station
- Victoria station
- Parliament Square
- Trafalgar Square
- Charing Cross station
- Aldwych

== N53 ==
Route N53 commenced operating on 27 October 1989 between Erith and Victoria bus station. On 28 July 1995 the route was withdrawn between Erith and Thamesmead and extended to Oxford Circus. On 8 January 2000 the Thamesmead to Plumstead section was withdrawn. On 28 June 2002, the route was withdrawn between Plumstead and Erith. On 15 February 2003 it was withdrawn between Whitehall and Oxford Circus. It ceased on 20 March 2004 when route 53 was converted to a 24-hour service. It was reinstated on 15 June 2019 when route 53 ceased to be a 24-hour service.

Current route

Route N53 operates via these primary locations:

- Whitehall Horse Guards Parade
- Westminster station
- Lambeth North station
- Elephant & Castle station
- Old Kent Road
- New Cross Gate station
- New Cross station
- Deptford Bridge station
- Blackheath
- Charlton
- Woolwich Arsenal station
- Plumstead Common
- Plumstead station

== N55 ==
Route N55 commenced operating on 28 April 2001 between Whipps Cross and Oxford Circus station. On 25 June 2004 it was extended from Whipps Cross to St Thomas of Canterbury Church. It has always been operated by Stagecoach London.

Current route

Route N55 operates via these primary locations:

- St Thomas of Canterbury Church
- South Woodford station
- Snaresbrook
- Wanstead station
- Whipps Cross
- Bakers Arms
- Lea Bridge station
- Clapton station
- Hackney Downs station
- Hackney Central station
- Cambridge Heath station
- Old Street station
- Tottenham Court Road station
- Oxford Circus station

== N63 ==
Route N63 commenced operating on 16 November 2002 between Crystal Palace and King's Cross station. It is operated by Transport UK London Bus.

Current route

Route N63 operates via these primary locations:

- Crystal Palace
- Honor Oak
- Peckham Rye station
- Peckham
- Old Kent Road
- Bricklayers Arms
- Elephant & Castle station
- Southwark station
- Blackfriars station
- Ludgate Circus
- City Thameslink station
- Farringdon station
- King's Cross station

== N65 ==
Route N65 commenced operating on 31 August 2002 between Kingston upon Thames and Ealing Broadway station. It ceased on 24 January 2004 when route 65 was converted to 24-hour operation. It was reintroduced on 25 October 2018 between Chessington World of Adventures and Ealing Broadway, as a re-numbering of route 65's night-only section between Kingston and Chessington.

Current route

Route N65 operates via these primary locations:

- Chessington World of Adventures
- Chessington South station
- Chessington North station
- Surbiton station
- Kingston station
- Ham Common
- Richmond station
- Kew Bridge station
- Brentford
- South Ealing station
- Ealing Broadway station

== N68 ==
Route N68 commenced operating on 27 March 1999 between Purley Cross and Trafalgar Square. On 28 April 2000, the route was diverted at Aldwych via Kingsway, and High Holborn to Tottenham Court Road station and extended from Purley to Old Coulsdon. Having been operated by Arriva London from its inception, on 31 March 2006 it was taken over by London Central and on 31 March 2018 by Abellio London.

Current route

Route N68 operates via these primary locations:

- Old Coulsdon
- Coulsdon South station
- Coulsdon Town station
- Reedham station
- Purley
- South Croydon
- East Croydon station
- Wellesley Road tram stop
- Thornton Heath High Street
- Selhurst Park
- Upper Norwood
- West Norwood station
- Tulse Hill station
- Herne Hill station
- Denmark Hill
- King's College Hospital
- Camberwell Green
- Elephant & Castle station
- Waterloo station
- Aldwych
- Holborn station
- Tottenham Court Road

== N72 ==
Route N72 commenced operating on 5 September 1999 between East Acton and Roehampton. It ceased on 24 April 2004 when route 72 was converted to 24-hour operation. With the closure of Hammersmith Bridge, it was reintroduced on 18 May 2019 with a routing via Putney Bridge.

On 13 December 2025, following a public consultation, route N72 was rerouted to additionally serve the White City Estate.

Current route

Route N72 operates via these primary locations:

- East Acton
- Hammersmith Hospital
- White City Estate
- Shepherd's Bush stations
- Hammersmith bus station
- Charing Cross Hospital
- Fulham High Street
- Putney Bridge station
- Barnes station
- Queen Mary's Hospital
- Roehampton

== N73 ==
Route N73 commenced operating on 22 September 1989 between Walthamstow Central station and Victoria bus station. On 17 June 2017, it was withdrawn between Victoria and Oxford Circus, being replaced by route 390.

Current route

Route N73 operates via these primary locations:

- Walthamstow bus station
- Blackhorse Road station
- Tottenham Hale station
- Seven Sisters station
- South Tottenham station
- Stamford Hill
- Stoke Newington station
- Essex Road station
- Angel station
- King's Cross station
- St Pancras International station
- Euston bus station
- Euston Square station
- Tottenham Court Road station
- Oxford Circus station

== N74 ==
Route N74 commenced operating on 23 November 2002 between Roehampton and Baker Street station.

Current route

Route N74 operates via these primary locations:

- Roehampton
- Putney station
- Charing Cross Hospital
- West Brompton station
- South Kensington station
- Knightsbridge station
- Hyde Park Corner station
- Marble Arch station
- Baker Street station

== N83 ==
Route N83 commenced operating on 13 September 2002 between Golders Green and Ealing Hospital. Operated by First London, it ceased on 16 April 2004 when route 83 became a 24-hour service.

It was reintroduced on 13 September 2016 when route 83 was curtailed to only operate between Golders Green and Alperton and route 483 was curtailed to operate between Harrow bus station and Ealing Hospital.

Current route

Route N83 operates via these primary locations:

- Ealing Hospital
- Ealing Broadway station
- North Ealing station
- Hanger Lane station
- Alperton station
- Wembley Central station
- Wembley Stadium station
- West Hendon
- Hendon station
- Hendon Central station
- Golders Green station

== N86 ==
Route N86 commenced operating on 26 June 2004 between Harold Hill and Stratford bus station replacing the withdrawn section of route N25 between Harold Hill and Ilford.

Current route

Route N86 operates via these primary locations:

- Harold Hill
- Gallows Corner
- Romford station
- Chadwell Heath
- Seven Kings station
- Ilford
- Manor Park
- Woodgrange Park station
- Forest Gate
- Stratford Broadway
- Stratford bus station

== N87 ==
Route N77 commenced on 18 August 1995 between Tolworth and Trafalgar Square. On 3 June 2006 route N77 was renumbered N87 and curtailed between Tolworth and Fairfield bus station.

Current route

Route N87 operates via these primary locations:

- Fairfield bus station
- New Malden
- Raynes Park station
- Wimbledon station
- Southfields
- Wandsworth
- Clapham Junction station
- Nine Elms station
- Vauxhall bus station
- Westminster station
- Charing Cross station
- Aldwych

== N89 ==
Route N89 commenced operating on 28 June 2002 between Erith and Trafalgar Square.

Current route

Route N89 operates via these primary locations:

- Trafalgar Square
- Aldwych
- Blackfriars station
- Southwark station
- Elephant & Castle station
- Camberwell Green
- Queens Road Peckham station
- New Cross Gate station
- New Cross station
- Deptford Bridge station
- Lewisham
- Blackheath station
- Shooter's Hill
- Welling station
- Bexleyheath
- Barnehurst station
- Slade Green station
- Erith

== N91 ==
Route N91 commenced operating on 25 February 1994 between Hornsey Rise and Trafalgar Square. On 23 June 1995, the route was extended from Hornsey Rise to Potters Bar. Having been operated by MTL London since its inception, when re-tendered it passed to Capital Citibus on 31 January 1997. It passed with the Capital Citybus to First London in July 1998. When next tendered, it was awarded to Metroline from 6 February 2009.

Current route

Route N91 operates via these primary locations:

- Cockfosters station
- Oakwood station
- Southgate station
- Arnos Grove station
- New Southgate station
- Bounds Green station
- Wood Green station
- Turnpike Lane station
- Caledonian Road station
- Caledonian Road & Barnsbury station
- King's Cross station
- Euston bus station
- Russell Square station
- Holborn station
- Charing Cross station
- Trafalgar Square

== N97 ==
The route is primarily used as a night replacement for the Piccadilly line between Piccadilly Circus and Hammersmith stations. Passengers can then continue their journey using night routes N91 (to Cockfosters) or N9 (to Heathrow). There is currently no night service for the Uxbridge branch. Operation of the route passed from London United to Tower Transit on 5 March 2016.

Current route

Route N97 operates via these primary locations:

- Hammersmith bus station
- West Brompton station
- Earl's Court station
- South Kensington station
- Knightsbridge station
- Hyde Park Corner station
- Piccadilly Circus station
- Trafalgar Square

== N98 ==
Route N98 commenced operating on 19 August 1995 between Stanmore station and Trafalgar Square. On 29 April 2000 the route was diverted at Oxford Circus to Red Lion Square. Initially operated by CentreWest, since 3 February 2001 it has been operated by Metroline.

Current route

Route N98 operates via these primary locations:

- Stanmore station
- Queensbury station
- Kingsbury station
- Neasden
- Willesden bus garage
- Kilburn High Road station
- Maida Vale station
- Edgware Road station
- Marble Arch station
- Wigmore Street
- Oxford Circus station
- Tottenham Court Road station
- Red Lion Square

== N109 ==
Route N109 commenced operating on 11 March 1994 between Coulsdon and Aldwych. It was withdrawn on 17 September 1999, being replaced by route N159. It was reintroduced on 28 August 2010 between Croydon and Oxford Circus station replacing route N159. Initially operated by Arriva London, upon being re-tendered it was taken over by Abellio London on 31 January 2015.

Current route

Route N109 operates via these primary locations:

- Oxford Circus station
- Piccadilly Circus station
- Trafalgar Square
- Westminster station
- Lambeth North station
- Kennington
- Brixton station
- Streatham Hill station
- Streatham station
- Norbury station
- West Croydon bus station
- Croydon town centre

== N113 ==
Route N113 commenced operating on 30 June 2012 between Edgware bus station and Trafalgar Square partly replacing route N13. In October 2026 it was withdrawn between the Selfridges flagship store on Orchard Street and Trafalgar Square and rerouted to Marble Arch station.

Current route

Route N113 operates via these primary locations:

- Edgware bus station
- Mill Hill
- Watford Way
- Hendon Central station
- Finchley Road & Frognal station
- Finchley Road station
- Swiss Cottage station
- St John's Wood station
- Baker Street station
- Marble Arch station

== N118 ==
Route N118 commenced operating on 17 January 2026 between Ruislip station and Trafalgar Square, running partially alongside route N18 and partially replacing the weekend night service on route 114.

Current route

Route N118 operates via these primary locations:

- Ruislip station
- South Ruislip station
- South Harrow
- Northolt
- Sudbury Hill station
- Sudbury & Harrow Road station
- Wembley Central station
- Stonebridge Park station
- Harlesden
- Kensal Green station
- Royal Oak station
- Edgware Road station
- Baker Street station
- Great Portland Street station
- Oxford Circus station
- Piccadilly Circus station
- Trafalgar Square

== N133 ==
Route N133 commenced operation on 24 January 2003 between Tooting and Liverpool Street bus station. On 1 September 2007 it was diverted at Streatham to Mitcham. Having been operated by London General since its inception, upon being re-tendered it was taken over by Arriva London on 22 January 2010.

Current route

Route N133 operates via these primary locations:

- Morden station
- Mitcham tram stop
- Streatham Common station
- Streatham station
- Streatham Hill station
- Brixton station
- Kennington station
- Elephant & Castle station
- Borough station
- London Bridge station
- Monument station
- Bank station
- Moorgate station
- Liverpool Street bus station

== N136 ==
Route N136 commenced operating on 9 February 2008 between Chislehurst and Oxford Circus station replacing route N36 between Grove Park and Oxford Circus. Having been operated by Stagecoach London since its inception, upon being re-tendered it was taken over by Go-Ahead London on 27 May 2017.

Current route

Route N136 operates via these primary locations:

- Oxford Circus station
- Piccadilly Circus station
- Westminster station
- Victoria station
- Vauxhall bus station
- Oval station
- Camberwell Green
- Queens Road Peckham station
- New Cross Gate station
- Lewisham station
- Catford bus garage
- Grove Park station
- Chislehurst

== N137 ==
Route N137 commenced operating on 16 March 2001 between Crystal Palace bus station and Oxford Circus station. Having been operated by London Central since its inception, upon being re-tendered it was taken over by Arriva London on 9 July 2004. In October 2026 it was withdrawn between Marble Arch station and Oxford Circus.

Current route

Route N137 operates via these primary locations:

- Crystal Palace bus station
- Streatham Hill station
- Clapham Common station
- Queenstown Road station
- Battersea Park station
- Sloane Square station
- Knightsbridge station
- Hyde Park Corner station
- Marble Arch station

== N140 ==
Route N140 operates beyond the operational hours of routes SL9 and 140. It commenced operating on 31 March 2000 between Harrow Weald bus garage and Heathrow Central bus station. It ceased on 16 April 2004 when route 140 was converted to a 24-hour service. It was reinstated on 7 December 2019 when route 140 was withdrawn between Heathrow Central bus station and Hayes & Harlington station, letting the section being transferred to the newly introduced route X140 (now SL9) and also when route 140 ceased to be a 24-hour service.

Current route

Route N140 operates via these primary locations:

- Harrow Weald bus garage
- Wealdstone
- Harrow & Wealdstone station
- Harrow bus station for Harrow-on-the-Hill station
- South Harrow station
- Northolt Park station
- Northolt station
- Yeading
- Hayes & Harlington station
- Harlington
- Heathrow Central bus station

== N155 ==
Route N155 commenced operating on 18 August 1995 between Sutton station and Trafalgar Square. On 28 May 1999, the route was extended from Trafalgar Square to Aldwych. On 12 December 2003, it was withdrawn between Sutton and Morden, being replaced by route N44. It has been operated by London General (now Go-Ahead London) since its inception.

Current route

Route N155 operates via these primary locations:

- Morden station
- Morden Road tram stop
- South Wimbledon station
- Colliers Wood station
- Tooting Broadway station
- Tooting Bec station
- Balham station
- Clapham South station
- Clapham Common station
- Clapham High Street station
- Clapham North station
- Stockwell station
- Oval station
- Kennington station
- Elephant & Castle station
- Lambeth North station
- Westminster station
- Trafalgar Square
- Charing Cross station
- Aldwych

== N171 ==
Route N171 commenced operating on 27 April 1996 between Hither Green station and Trafalgar Square. In 2000 it route was diverted at Aldwych to Tottenham Court Road station instead of Trafalgar Square. In 2006, the route was changed to terminate at Catford bus garage instead of Hither Green, and so mirror the day 171 route.

On 30 April 2011 it was rerouted back to Hither Green station. It is operated by Go-Ahead London.

Current route

Route N171 operates via these primary locations:

- Hither Green station
- Catford Bridge station
- Catford station
- Crofton Park station
- New Cross station
- New Cross Gate station
- Queens Road Peckham station
- Elephant & Castle station
- Waterloo station
- Aldwych
- Holborn station
- Tottenham Court Road station

== N199 ==
Route N199 commenced operating on 12 September 2015 between St Mary Cray station and Trafalgar Square to replace discontinued night bus N47.

Current route

Route N199 operates via these primary locations:

- St Mary Cray station
- Orpington station
- Petts Wood station
- Bromley Common
- Bromley South station
- Downham
- Catford
- Ladywell
- Lewisham station
- Greenwich station
- Deptford
- Surrey Quays station
- Canada Water station
- Bermondsey station
- London Bridge station
- Monument station
- Cannon Street station
- Mansion House station
- City Thameslink station
- Aldwych
- Charing Cross station
- Trafalgar Square

== N205 ==
Route N205 was introduced on 31 August 2013 when route 205 ceased to be a 24-hour route. It has been operated by East London since its inception.

Current route

Route N205 operates via these primary locations:

- Leyton Downsell Road
- Stratford City bus station
- Mile End station
- Aldgate East station
- Liverpool Street station
- Old Street station
- King's Cross station
- Euston bus station
- Paddington station

== N207 ==
Route N207 commenced operation on 11 October 1996 between Uxbridge station and Victoria bus station. On 12 November 1999 it was diverted at Oxford Circus to Aldwych. On 28 April 2000 it was again rerouted to Bloomsbury Square. Having been operated by First London since privatisation, it was included in the sale of Hayes garage to Metroline in June 2013. Upon being re-tendered, it passed to Abellio London on 6 April 2019.

Current route

Route N207 operates via these primary locations:

- Uxbridge station
- Hillingdon
- Hayes End
- Southall
- Ealing Hospital
- Hanwell
- West Ealing
- Ealing Broadway station
- Ealing Common station
- Acton
- Shepherd's Bush Market station
- Shepherd's Bush station
- Holland Park station
- Notting Hill Gate station
- Marble Arch station
- Wigmore Street
- Oxford Circus station
- Tottenham Court Road station
- Bloomsbury Square

== N242 ==
Route N242 commenced operating on 31 January 2003 between Homerton University Hospital and Tottenham Court Road station. It ceased on 23 April 2004 when route 242 was converted to a 24-hour service. It was reinstated on 15 June 2019 when route 242 ceased to be a 24-hour service.

Current route

Route N242 operates via these primary locations:

- Homerton University Hospital
- Hackney Central station
- Shoreditch
- Liverpool Street station
- Bank station
- St Paul's station
- City Thameslink station
- Tottenham Court Road station

== N250 ==
Route N250 commenced operating on 29 August 2003 between Fairfield Halls and Brixton station. It ceased on 20 March 2004 when route 250 was converted to a 24-hour service. It was reinstated on 2 November 2019 when route 250 was withdrawn between Fairfield Halls and West Croydon bus station and also when route 250 ceased to be a 24-hour service.

Current route

Route N250 operates via these primary locations:

- Fairfield Halls
- Whitgift Centre
- West Croydon bus station
- Croydon University Hospital
- Thornton Heath station
- Norbury
- Streatham station
- Streatham Hill station
- Brixton station

== N253 ==
Route N253 commenced operating on 3 September 1993 running between Aldgate bus station and Euston bus station. On 25 November 1994 it was extended to Trafalgar Square. On 29 May 1998, the route was withdrawn between Trafalgar Square and Tottenham Court Road station.

Current route

Route N253 operates via these primary locations:

- Tottenham Court Road station
- Euston bus station
- Camden Town station
- Camden Road station
- Holloway
- Finsbury Park station
- Manor House station
- Stamford Hill station
- Clapton station
- Hackney Downs station
- Hackney Central station
- Cambridge Heath station
- Bethnal Green station
- Whitechapel station
- Aldgate East station
- Aldgate tube station

== N263 ==
Route N263 commenced operating on 6 April 2025 between Finsbury Square and Tally Ho Corner following the withdrawal of daytime route 271 and night time route N271.

Current route

Route N263 operates via these primary locations:

- North Finchley bus station
- East Finchley station
- Highgate Village
- Archway station
- Upper Holloway station
- Holloway Road station
- Highbury & Islington station
- Essex Road station
- Old Street station
- Finsbury Square

== N266 ==
Route N266 commenced operating on 7 December 2019 between Brent Cross and Hammersmith bus stations when route 266 ceased to be a 24-hour service as part of bus changes preparing for the opening of the Elizabeth line.

Current route

Route N266 operates via these primary locations:

- Brent Cross bus station
- Staples Corner
- Cricklewood
- Willesden Green station
- Harlesden
- Willesden Junction station
- North Acton station
- Acton Main Line station
- Acton Central station
- Acton Vale
- Ravenscourt Park station
- Hammersmith station
- Hammersmith bus station

== N277 ==
Route N277 commenced operating on 30 June 2018 between Cubitt Town and Islington.

Current route

Route N277 operates via these primary locations:

- Cubitt Town Asda
- Mudchute station
- Canary Wharf station
- Mile End station
- Dalston Junction station
- Angel station
- Islington White Lion Street

== N279 ==
Route N279 commenced operating on 26 April 1996 between Upshire and Victoria bus station. On 15 October 1999 it was withdrawn between Upshire and Waltham Cross. On 15 October 2004 it was cut back from Victoria to Trafalgar Square.

Current route

Route N279 operates via these primary locations:

- Waltham Cross
- Turkey Street station
- Edmonton Green station
- Bruce Grove station
- Seven Sisters station
- Finsbury Park station
- Camden Road station
- Camden Town station
- Tottenham Court Road station
- Trafalgar Square

== N343 ==
Route N343 commenced operating on 2 February 2001 between New Cross bus garage and Victoria bus station. Having been operated by London Central since its inception, about being re-tendered it was taken over by Travel London in 2006. It was included in the sale of Travel London to Abellio London in May 2009. Upon being re-tendered it returned to Go-Ahead London on 13 February 2018.

Current route

Route N343 operates via these primary locations:

- New Cross bus garage
- Brockley
- Peckham Rye station
- Elephant & Castle station
- Borough station
- London Bridge station
- Aldwych
- Charing Cross station
- Trafalgar Square

== N381 ==
Route N381 commenced operating on 9 October 1999 between Peckham and Whitehall. Initially operated by London Central, upon being re-tendered it was taken over by Connex on 9 October 2004. It was included in the sale of Connex to Travel London in February 2004 which in turn was sold to Abellio London in May 2009.

Current route

Route N381 operates via these primary locations:

- Peckham
- Surrey Quays station
- Canada Water station
- Rotherhithe station
- Bermondsey station
- London Bridge station
- Southwark
- Waterloo station
- Westminster station
- Whitehall Horse Guards Parade

== N472 ==
Route N472 commenced operating on 24 January 2026 between North Greenwich bus station and Abbey Wood station, replacing the night service on 24-hour route 472.

Current route

Route N472 operates via these primary locations:

- North Greenwich bus station for North Greenwich station
- Greenwich Millennium Village
- Charlton station
- Woolwich Arsenal station
- Woolwich station
- Plumstead bus garage
- Belmarsh Prison
- Thamesmead
- Abbey Wood station

== N550 ==
Route N550 commenced on 30 October 2008 between Canning Town bus station and Trafalgar Square replacing route N50 between Canning Town and East Beckton. Initially operated by East London, upon being re-tendered it was taken over by Tower Transit on 31 August 2013. When next tendered it passed to CT Plus on 1 August 2018. It is now operated by Stagecoach London.

Current route

Route N550 operates via these primary locations:

- Canning Town bus station
- Leamouth
- East India station
- Blackwall
- Cubitt Town
- Island Gardens station
- Millwall
- Canary Wharf station
- Westferry station
- Limehouse station
- Aldgate East station
- Aldgate station
- Bank station
- Mansion House station
- Blackfriars station
- Embankment station
- Trafalgar Square

== N551 ==
Route N551 commenced on 30 October 2008 between Gallions Reach Shopping Park and Trafalgar Square. Initially operated by Go-Ahead London, upon being re-tendered it was taken over by Tower Transit on 31 August 2013. When next tendered it passed to CT Plus on 1 August 2018. It is now operated by Stagecoach London.

Current route

Route N551 operates via these primary locations:

- Gallions Reach Shopping Park
- Gallions Reach station
- Beckton bus station
- Prince Regent station
- Custom House station
- Canning Town bus station
- Limehouse station
- Aldgate station
- Bank station
- Mansion House station
- City Thameslink station
- Trafalgar Square

== See also ==
- Night Tube
