= Berrys Coaches =

English coach operator

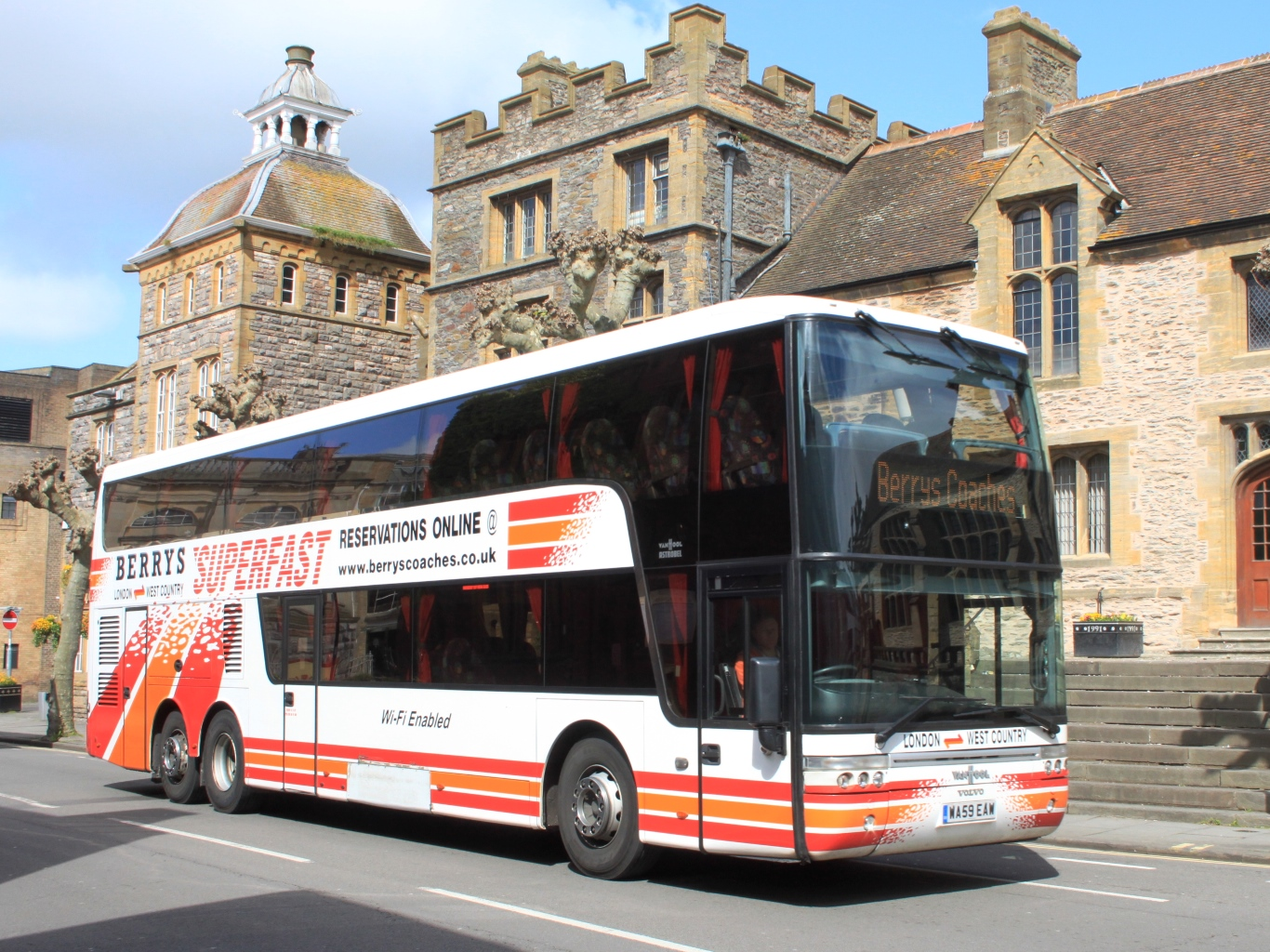
- Van Hool bodied Volvo B12B in Taunton in May 2014
- Founded: 1920
- Headquarters: Taunton
- Service area: Somerset
- Website: www.berryscoaches.co.uk

Berrys Coaches is a coach operator based in Taunton, Somerset. It was established in 1920 and is still a family owned business today.

== History ==
Berrys started out as a road transport company set up by Clifford Berry in 1920. From there, Berrys continued to grow and established itself as a bus and coach company, acquiring more vehicles and moving locations within Taunton to keep up with the expansion.

== Superfast coach services ==
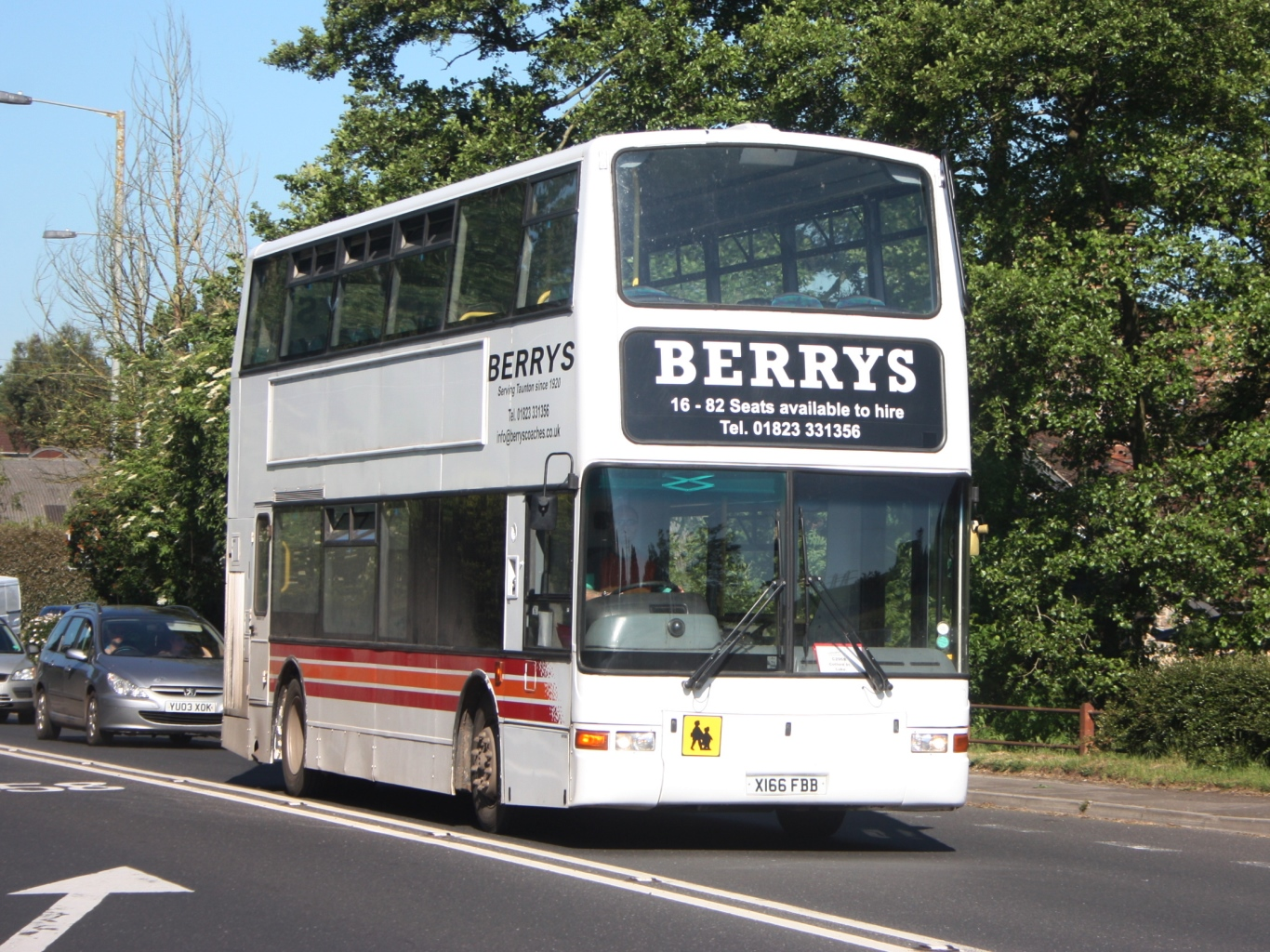
Plaxton President bodied Volvo B7TL in May 2017

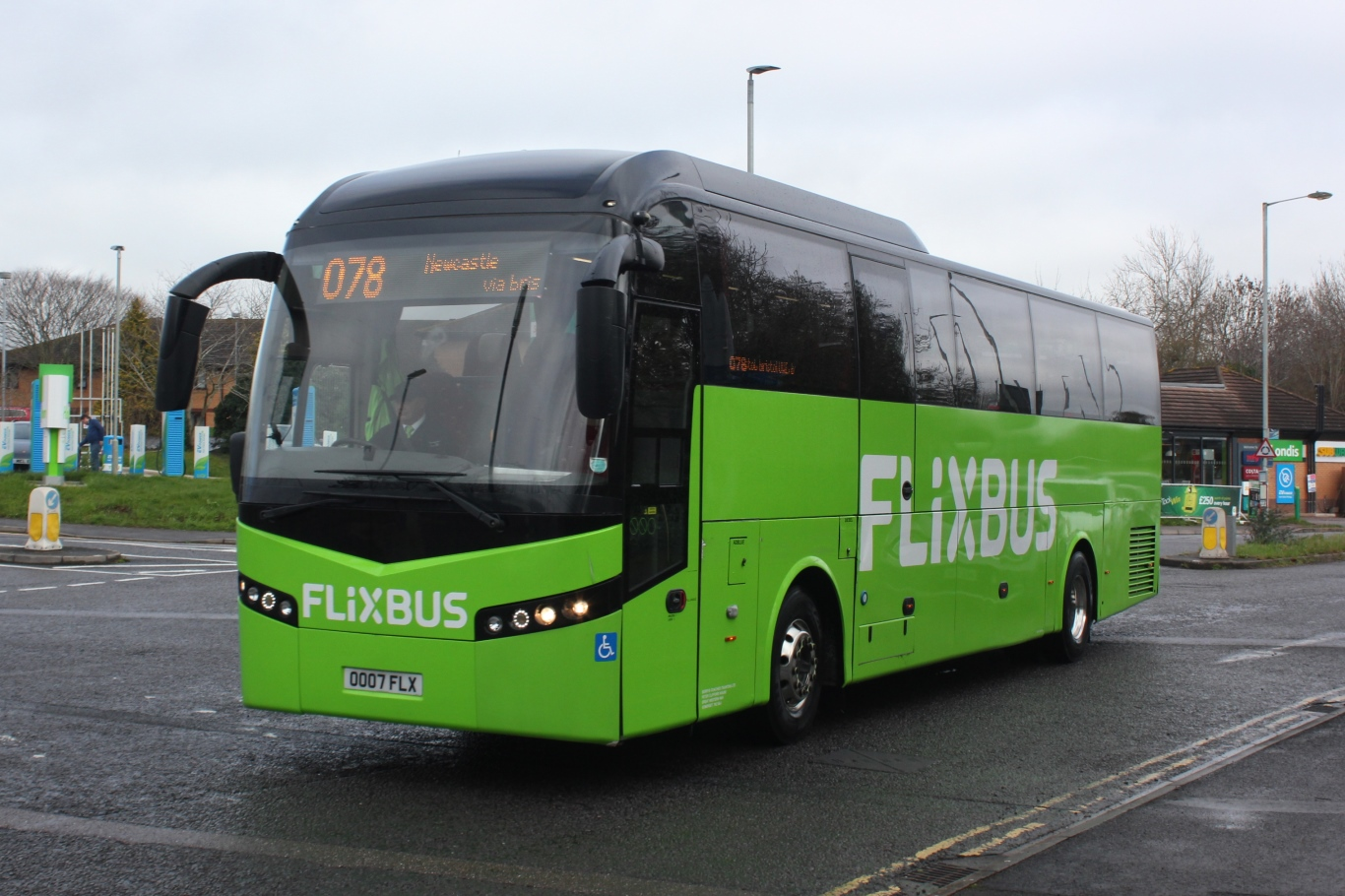
Flixbus coach operated by Berrys

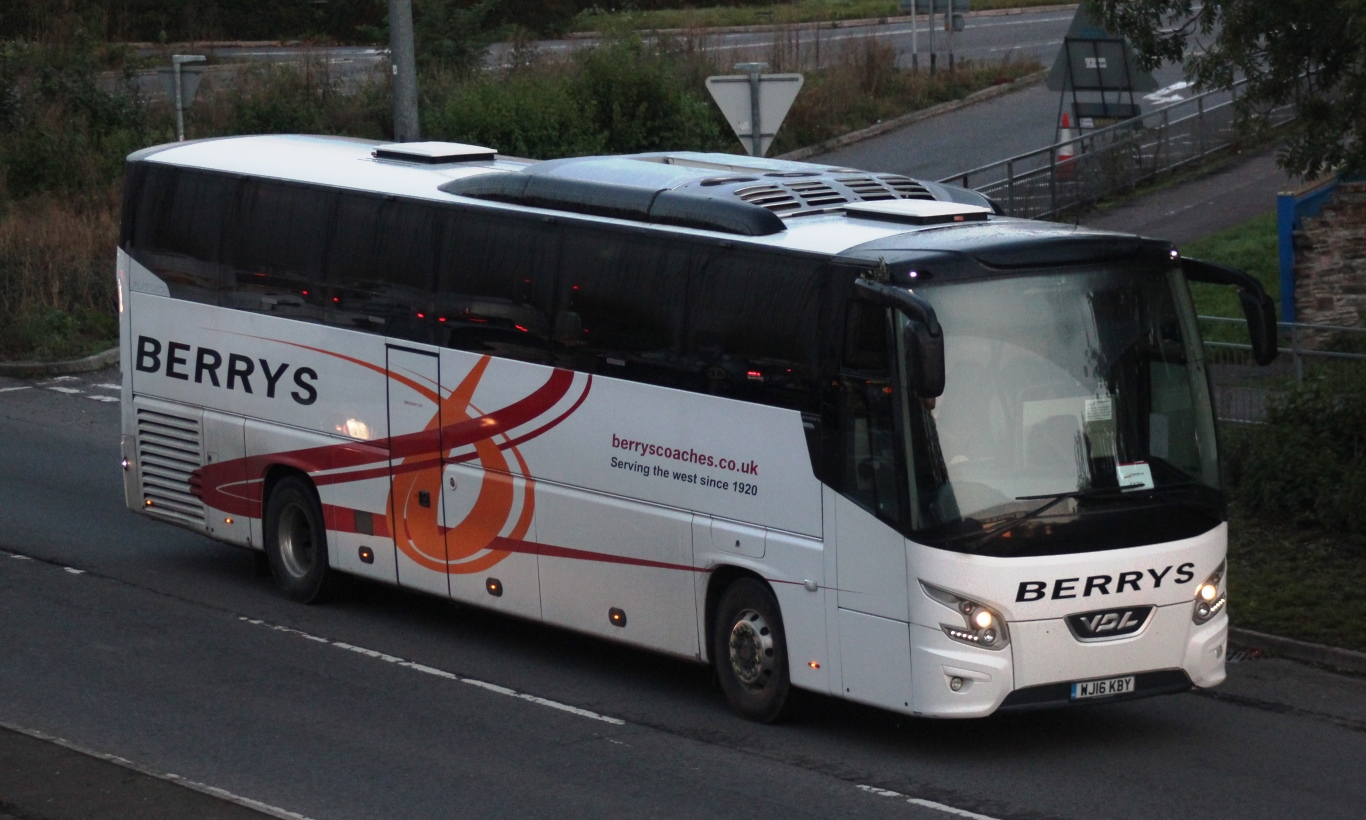
VDL Futura coach in September 2020

Berrys started operating a service between Somerset and London in 1981 following deregulation of the UK coach industry by the Transport Act 1980. Today it operates five services under the 'Superfast' brand in each direction to and from Hammersmith bus station in London over three routes:

- Superfast 1 - Wellington, Taunton, North Petherton, Bridgwater
- Superfast 2 - Taunton, Ilminster, South Petherton, Yeovil, Ilchester, RNAS Yeovilton, Wincanton
- Superfast 3 - Taunton, Street, Glastonbury, Wells, Shepton Mallet, Frome, Warminster, Codford, Amesbury

(The order of towns is shown here from Somerset towards London)

== Other operations ==
Berrys Coaches run a programme of tours offering a variety of inclusive and coach-only day trips. They also operate home-to-school transport for Somerset Council and other customers, as of 2021 transporting more than 1,600 students each school day. It began operating services under contract to FlixBus from 2022 between Plymouth and London via Taunton and between Taunton and Newcastle upon Tyne from 2023.

Its workshop and maintenance facilities were expanded to provide services to external to both other PSV operators and local HGV operators. These include vehicle inspection, repairs and maintenance and an ATF approved testing lane.

Berrys operated local services around Taunton in the 1990s under the Beaver Bus brand using Bristol VRT double-deck buses in competition with Southern National.

== Fleet ==
Berrys operate a fleet of buses, coaches and executive minibuses for their own services and private hire work. These range from 16 to 78 seats.

After World War II the company operated a fleet based for a long time on Plaxton bodies and Bedford chassis. In the 1980s, as the company had preferred Volvo chassis, they began purchasing the first Van Hool bodied coaches, which still today form a large part of the Superfast and Executive fleet. The local school and tour fleet is based mainly on VDL Futura coaches.
