= Edgware bus station =

Bus station in the London Borough of Barnet, England

Coordinates: 51.6129°N 0.2743°W

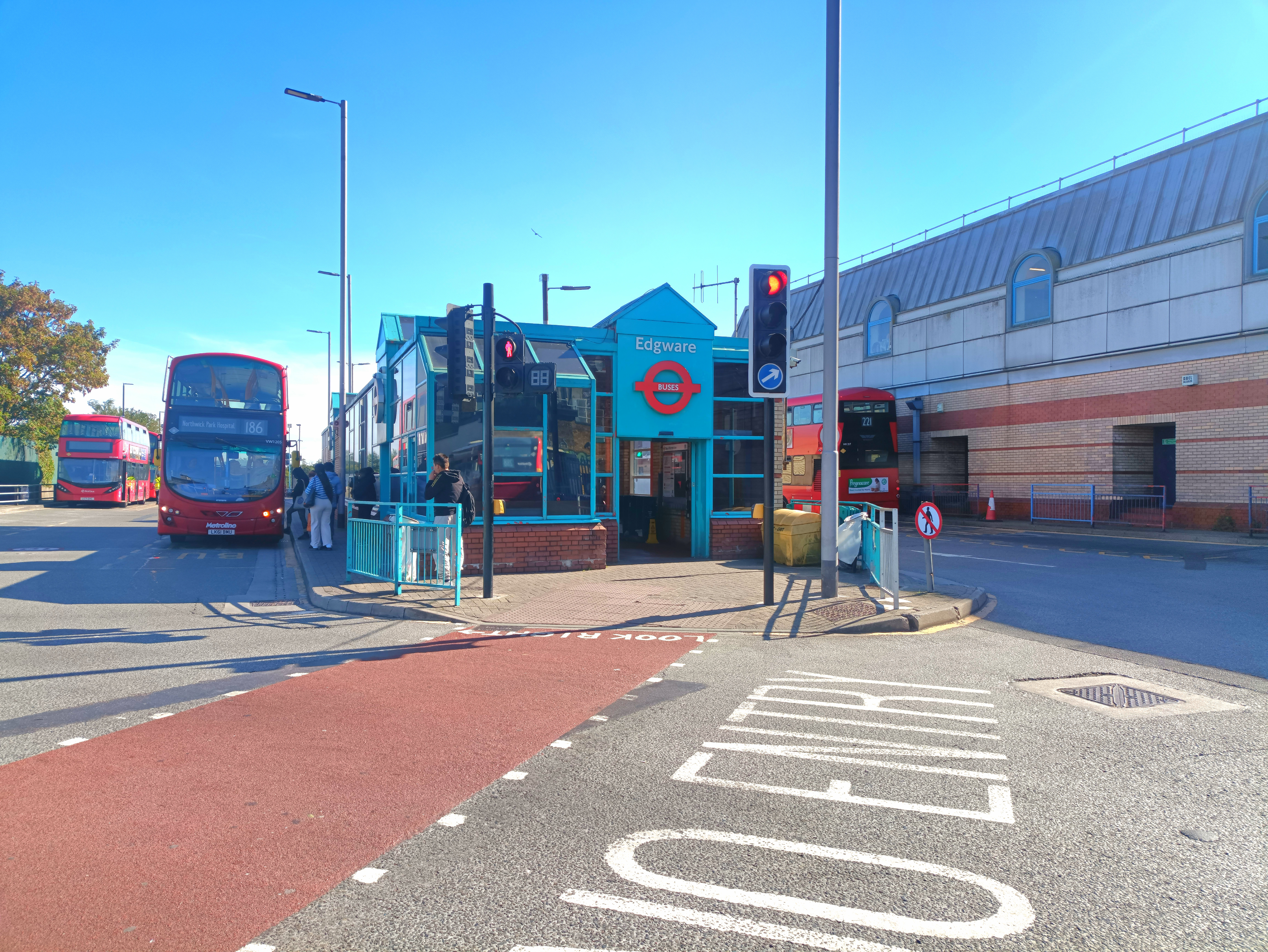
- The bus station in 2025

General information
- Location: Station Road, Edgware; London Borough of Barnet
- Operator: Transport for London
- Bus routes: 32, 79, 107, 113, 142, 186, 204, 221, 240, 251, 288, 292, 303, 340, 384, 606, 642, N5, N32 and N113
- Bus stands: 5
- Bus operators: Arriva London; Metroline; London Sovereign; Sullivan Buses
- Connections: Edgware Underground station
Location

Edgware Bus Station serves the Edgware suburb of the London Borough of Barnet, Greater London, England. The station is owned and maintained by Transport for London.

The bus station is off Station Road, situated a short distance away from Edgware Station and the Broadwalk Shopping Centre.

There are five stands within the bus station. The main operators at the bus station are Metroline, Arriva Shires & Essex, Arriva London and London Sovereign

Buses go from Edgware bus station as far afield Watford, Borehamwood, Hatfield, New Barnet, Arnos Grove, Wood Green, Marylebone in Central London, Kilburn, Alperton, Sudbury and Harrow.

In August 2009, writer Tanya Gold attempted to be the writer in residence at the bus station emulating Alain de Botton who had a similar position at Heathrow Airport

== Gallery ==
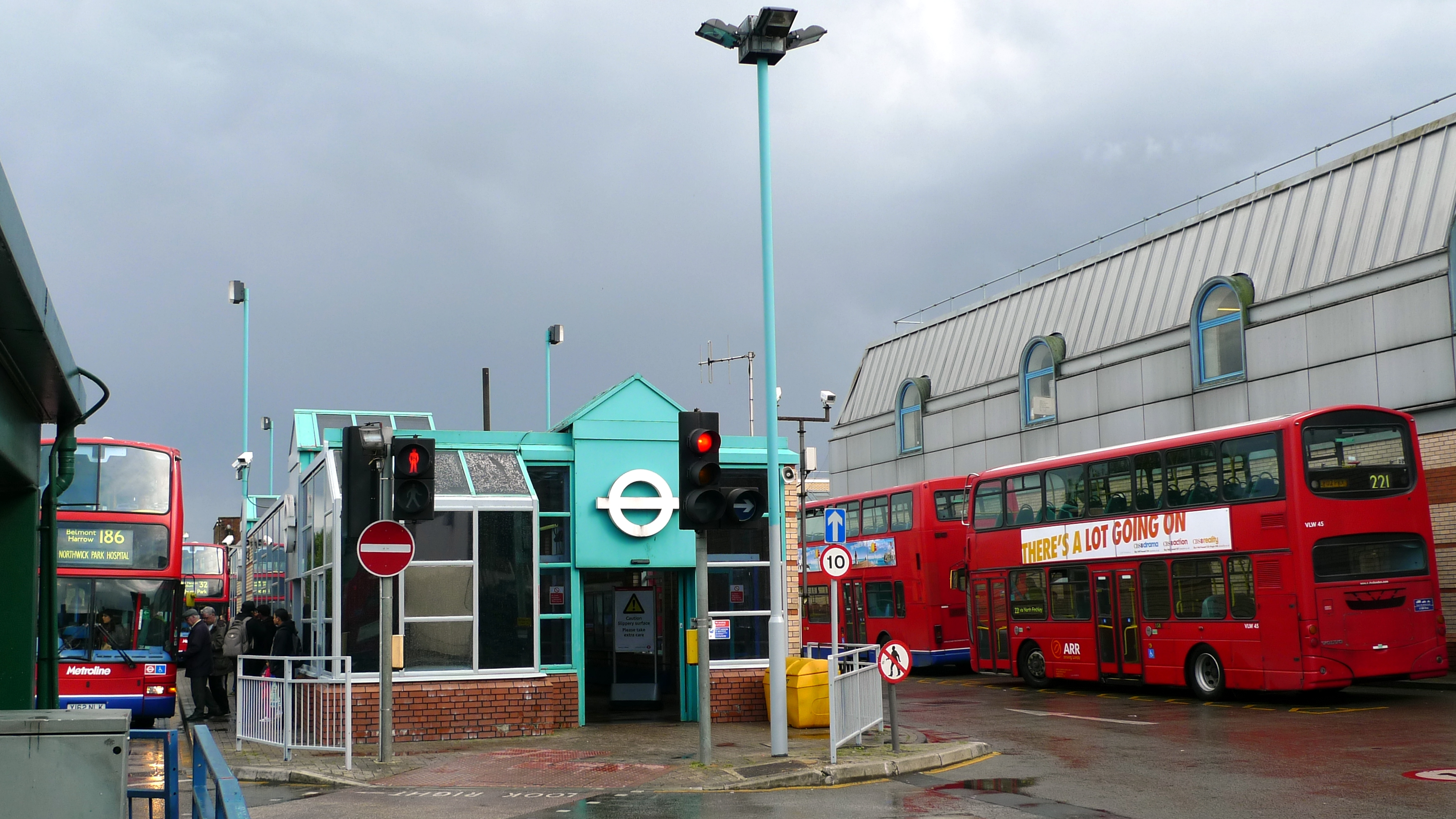
Edgware bus station in June 2011

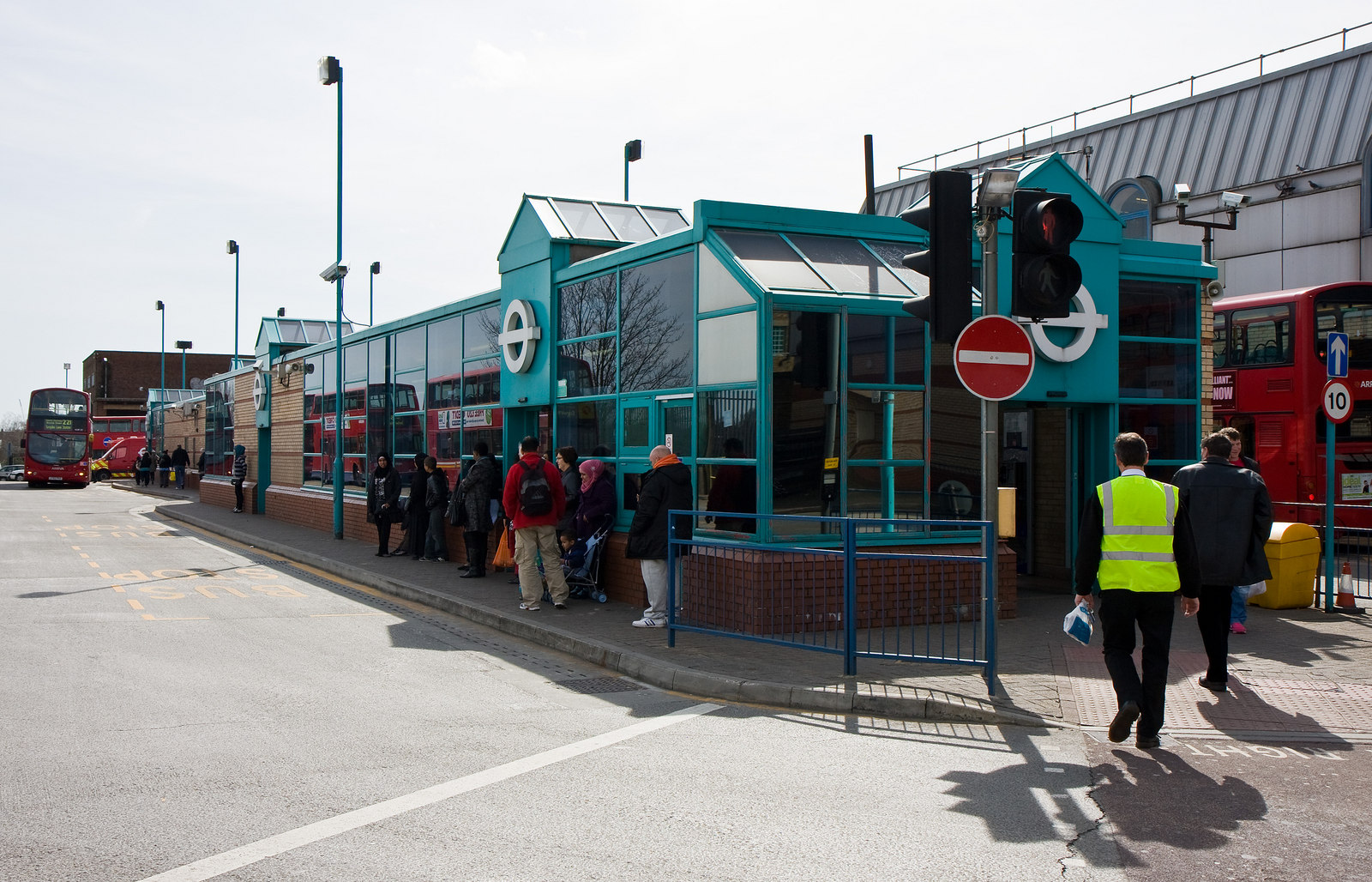

== See also ==
- List of bus and coach stations in London
