= Hammersmith bus station =

Bus station in London, England

Coordinates: 51.4921°N 0.2240°W

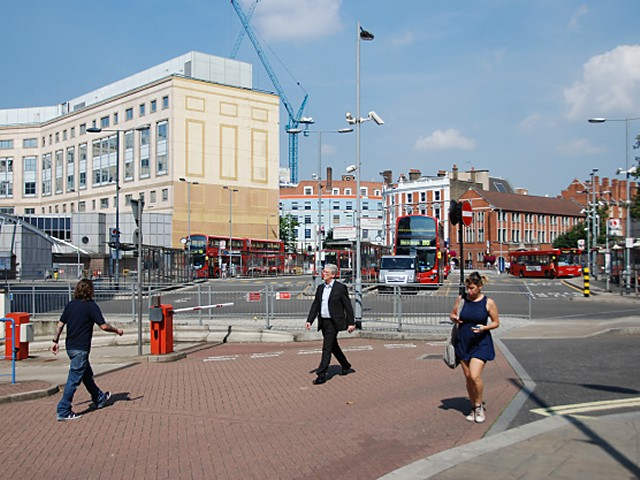
- The lower bus station in 2012

General information
- Location: Hammersmith; London Borough of Hammersmith & Fulham
- Operator: Transport for London
- Bus operators: Berrys Coaches; London General; London United; Metroline; Transport UK London Bus
- Connections: Hammersmith tube station (Piccadilly and District lines); Hammersmith tube station (Circle and Hammersmith & City lines)
Location

Hammersmith bus station is located adjacent to the District & Piccadilly and Circle and Hammersmith & City lines London Underground stations in Hammersmith. It is owned and maintained by Transport for London.

The bus station is divided into two sections (lower and upper stations). The routes which serve the lower station, outside Hammersmith Broadway, are 110, 218 and N266. The routes which serve the upper station, above Hammersmith Broadway, are 9, 27, 72, 190, 211, 220, 267, 295, 306, H91, N9, N11 and N97. The upper station is also served by Berrys Coaches' Taunton to London services.

== History ==
Butterwick bus station was replaced by Hammersmith bus station in 1993. Butterwick Bus Station was demolished in late 1992 to make way for the new bus station. Route 667 used to terminate at the bus station and was operated from Fulwell bus garage.

In May 1937, a crowd gathered at Hammersmith bus station to watch the first route 11 bus leave after a strike lasting a month.

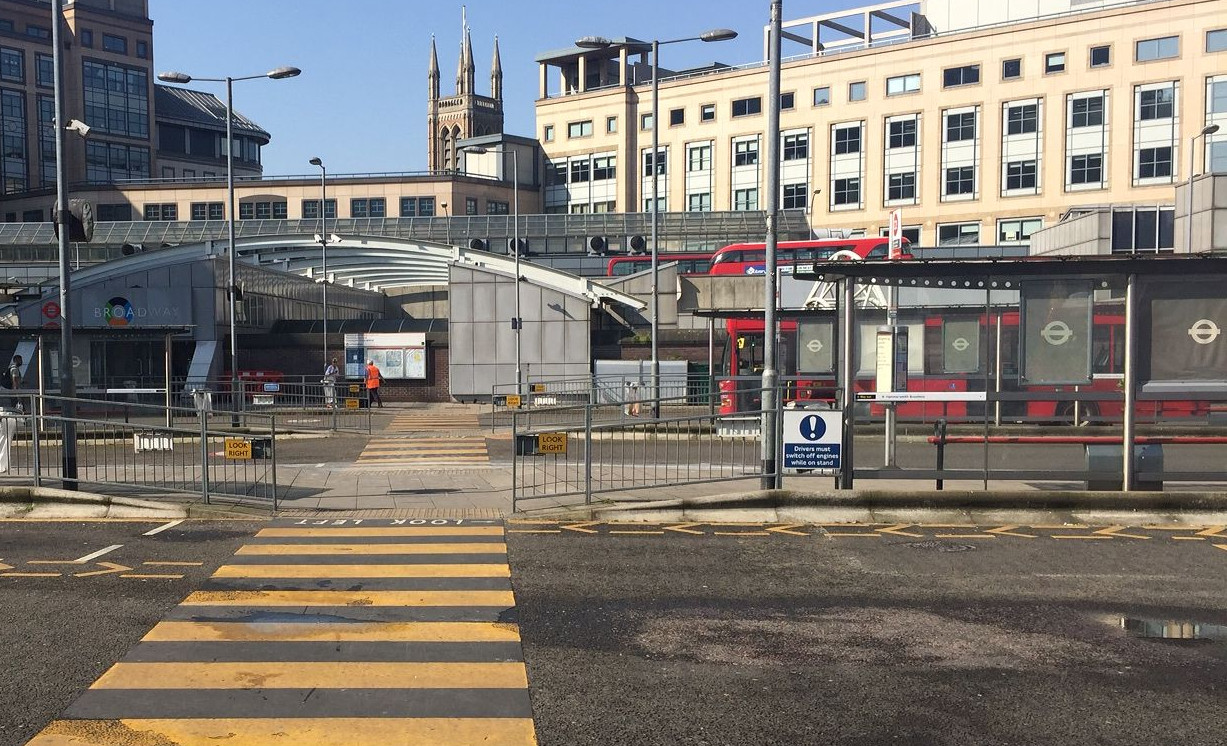
Hammersmith Bus Station Lower

In 2004, Transport for London was successful in getting planning permission to extend the bus station. The extended bus station would include an information facility, cycle racks, and CCTV coverage. The new bus station's construction began in 2006 and the lower bus station opened in 2008. The road surrounding the new development was changed slightly, with a subway used to cross the road closed down. The extension was opened in February 2008.

In August 2011, Transport for London refurbished the southern end of the bus station. This refurbishment meant routes 9 and 10 had to move stops, and the closed bus stop was converted into a rest area for the bus station's staff.

Following the identification of structural weaknesses of Hammersmith Bridge in April 2019, routes across the river through Barnes have been suspended until further notice.

== Crime ==
In December 2004, an x-ray weapons scanner was introduced for a week at the bus station. The bus station was chosen for the trial because of the high number of disorder reports at the site.

In September 2006, a dispersal order was introduced to the bus station after gangs meeting at Hammersmith Broadway. In January 2007, the order was extended for another three months.

On 16 May 2011, a 14-year-old boy was stabbed at the lower bus station.

== See also ==
- List of bus and coach stations in London
