= London Buses route 27 =

London bus route

27
- Transport UK London Bus New Routemaster at Hammersmith Broadway in October 2026

Overview
- Operator: Transport UK London Bus
- Garage: Battersea
- Vehicle: New Routemaster

Route
- Start: Camden Market
- Via: Camden Town; Mornington Crescent; Marylebone; Paddington; Kensington
- End: Hammersmith Grove

London Buses route 27 is a Transport for London contracted bus route in London, England. Running between Camden Market and Hammersmith Grove, it is operated by Transport UK London Bus.

== History ==
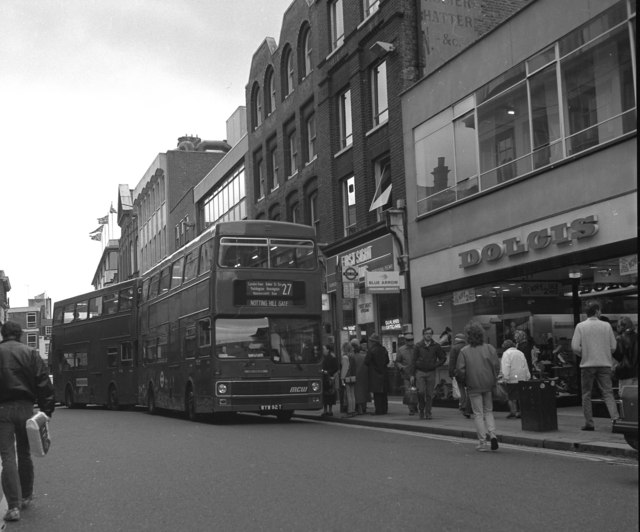
London Transport MCW Metrobus in Richmond in March 1988

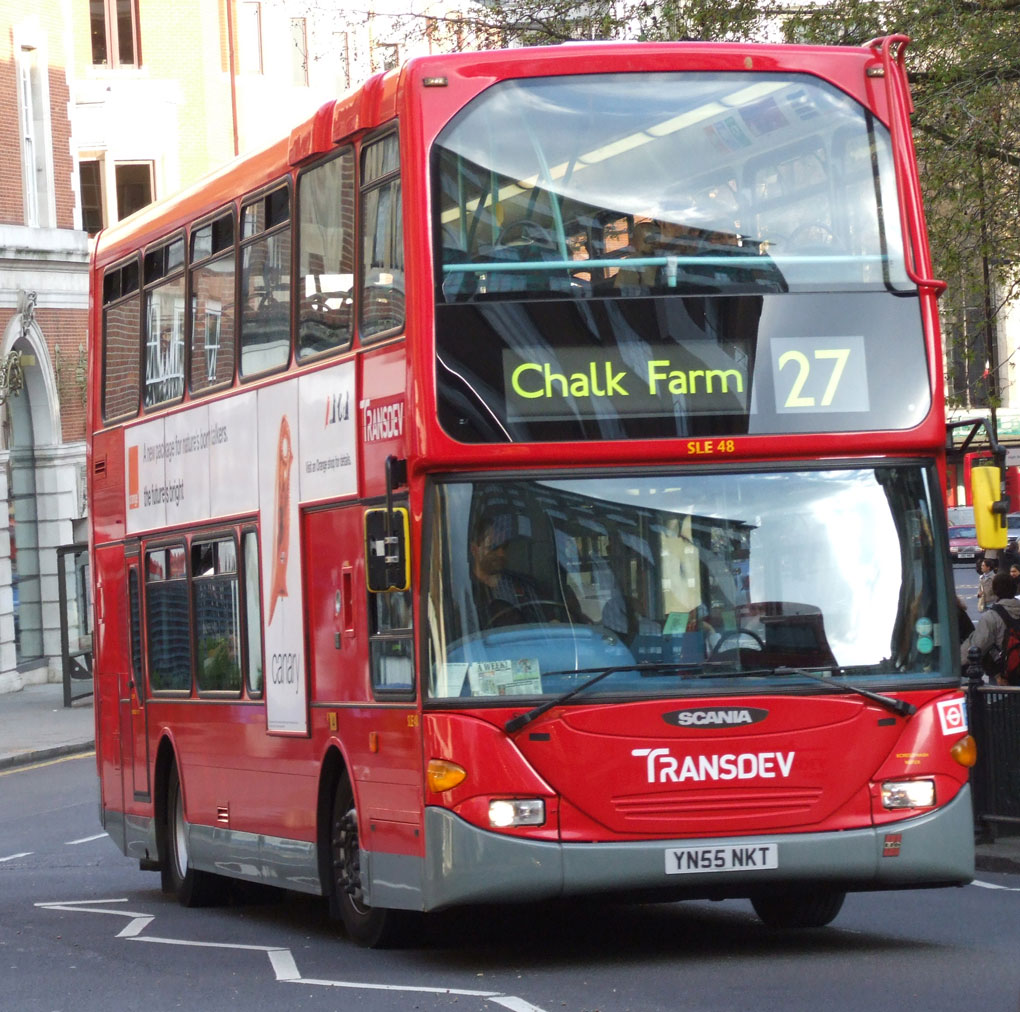
Transdev London Scania OmniDekka on Kensington Church Street in April 2006

Route 27 was introduced between Hounslow and Muswell Hill via current route 281 and Twickenham, Richmond, Kew and Turnham Green. At Camden Town, the route operated to Archway and Muswell Hill. The route was extended from Turnham Green to Hounslow in 1911. The route operated through World War II, when it was used by famous passengers including Peter Cushing to reach the Q Theatre near Kew Bridge.

In the 1950s route 27 became the main route and route 27A was withdrawn from being the main route. In 1950, the route took part in trials to reassure the police that eight-foot buses presented no danger to other traffic. The route operated from Holloway garage at the time.

Upon being re-tendered, the route was awarded to First CentreWest's Westbourne Park garage on 11 November 2000. When next re-tendered the route returned to London United's Stamford Brook garage from 12 November 2005.

London United commenced a further contract on 10 November 2012 with the route extended from Turnham Green to Chiswick Business Park. The extension was funded by the London Borough of Hounslow through developer contributions from Chiswick Business Park. New Alexander Dennis Enviro400Hs were introduced.

New Routemasters cascaded from route 10 were introduced on 24 November 2018.

In March 2019 the section between Chiswick Business Park and Hammersmith Grove was withdrawn. The 24 hour service was also removed with route N27 being introduced to cover the night service.

Abellio London was awarded the contract for route 27 when it was re-tendered effective 9 November 2019 from its Battersea garage.

In 2021, the service frequency during peak times was reduced from 8 buses per hour to 6.

== Current route ==
Route 27 operates via these primary locations:

- Camden Market
- Camden Town station
- Mornington Crescent station
- Warren Street station
- Great Portland Street station
- Regent's Park station
- Baker Street station
- Marylebone station
- St Mary's Hospital
- Paddington station
- Queensway
- Notting Hill Gate station
- High Street Kensington station
- Phillimore Gardens
- Kensington (Olympia) station
- Brook Green
- Hammersmith bus station
- Hammersmith Grove

== Notable drivers ==
Singer Matt Monro was a driver on route 27 prior to beginning his musical career. In January 2011, bus driver Kenny MacKay published a book titled The Road Ahead: Observations of a London Bus Driver about his experiences as a driver on route 27.
