= Gallions Reach Shopping Park =

Retail park in Beckton, London, England

Coordinates: 51.51°N 0.08°E

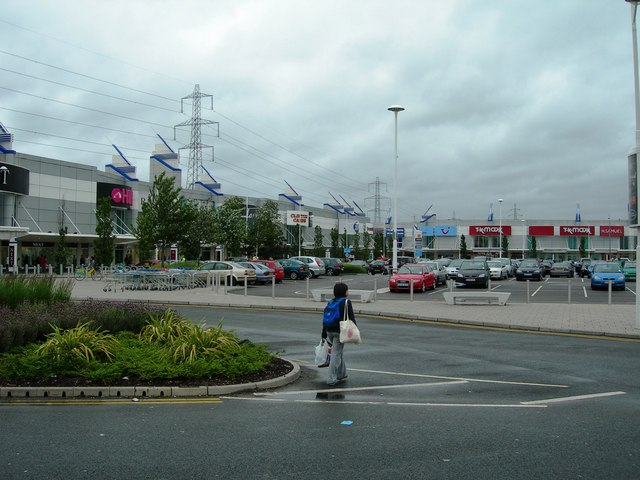
Inside the shopping park

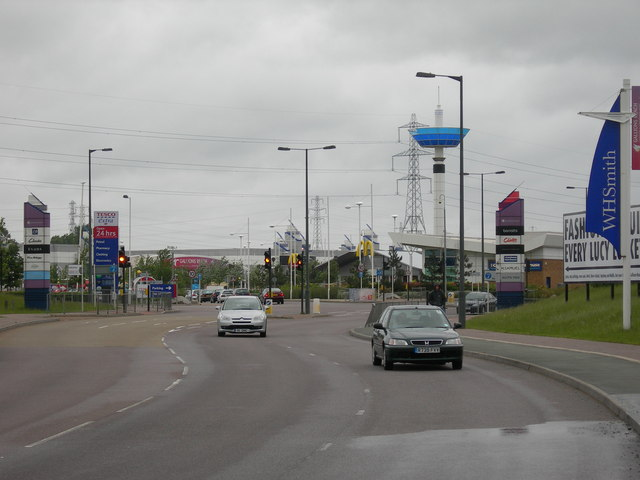
Armada Way leading to Gallions Reach shopping park

Gallions Reach Shopping Park is a major out-of-town retail park in Beckton, east London, England. Located on Armada Way beside the River Thames, Gallions Reach is the largest retail park within London and the M25, containing 34 units in an area of 324,000 square feet.

== History ==
The 65 acres (26 ha) shopping park was developed by Castlemore and completed by the end of 2003, on part of the former Beckton Gas Works. In 2006, Standard Life Investments purchased the retail park for £208 million.

== Services ==
Gallions Reach provides 2,000 car parking spaces. It includes retailers such as Smyths Toys, River Island, Boots and McDonald's, and is anchored by a large Tesco Extra store.

== Future ==
In 2018, the owners of the site, Aberdeen Standard Investments, stated to the London Plan consultation that they wished to develop the site into a major town centre with commercial and residential development. In December 2020, Aberdeen Standard contributed towards the cost of the planning and technical work of the Docklands Light Railway extension to Thamesmead, which would include a station at Beckton Riverside to serve the site.
