= Lambeth North =

Lambeth North may refer to:

- Lambeth North tube station, a London Underground station
- Lambeth North (London County Council constituency) (1889–1949)
- Lambeth North (UK Parliament constituency) (1885–1950)
- North Lambeth
