= Accessibility of transport in London =

Aspect of transport in London

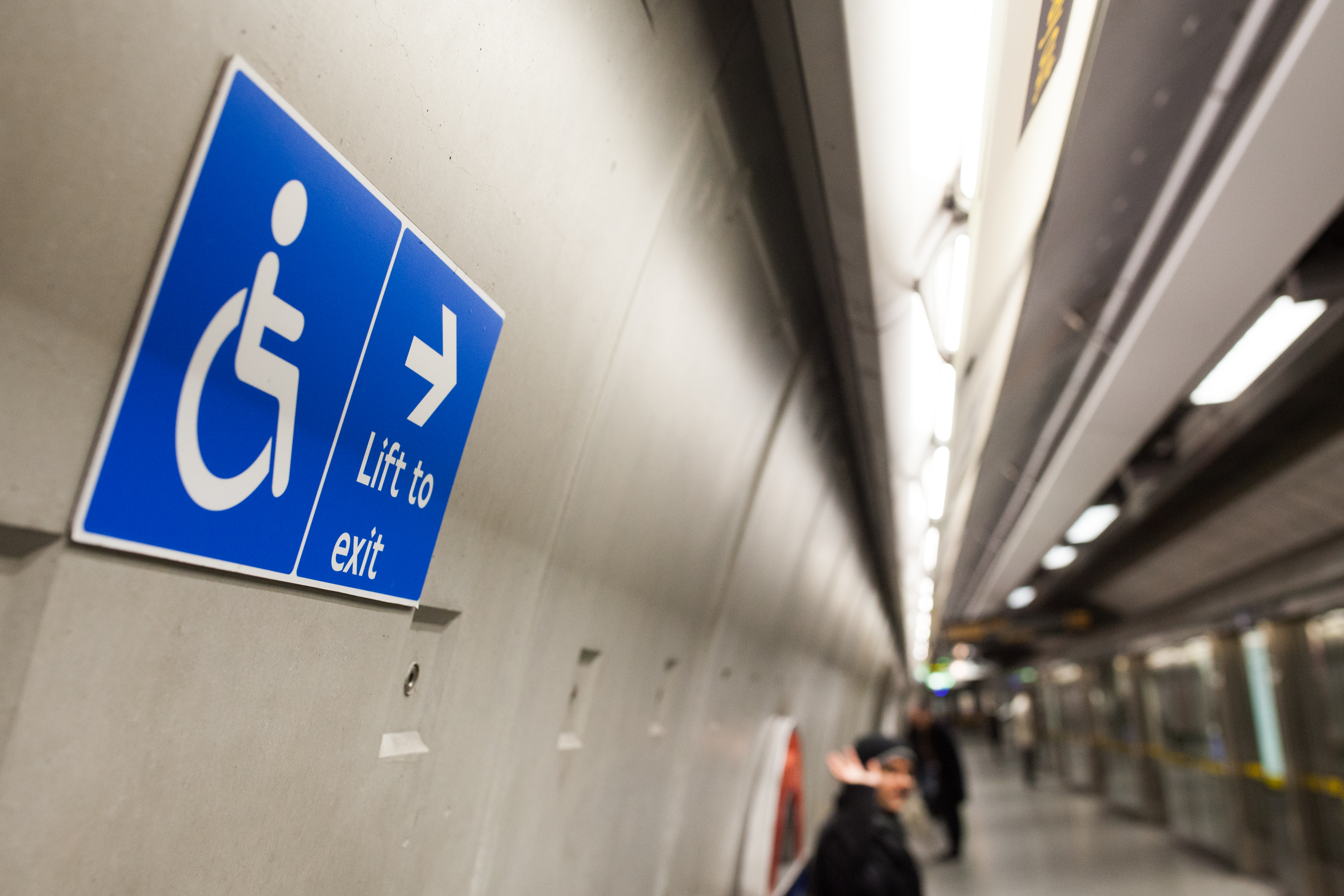
Signs for lifts at Southwark station

The accessibility of public transport services in Greater London is incomplete. Much of the rail network in London (including the London Underground and London Overground) was built before accessibility was a requirement. Unlike in the United States, Underground stations built in the 1960s and 1970s made no provision for the disabled, with wheelchair users banned from the deep-level tunnels on Underground lines until 1993.

From the beginning of the 1980s onwards, accessibility improvements began to be made, with the opening of the accessible Docklands Light Railway (DLR) in 1987 and wider consideration of accessibility needs. Further improvements followed, with the introduction of low-floor buses in 1993, the passing of the Disability Discrimination Act in 1995 and the opening of the Jubilee Line Extension in 1999 – which provided step-free access at 11 new Underground stations. From 2000, all London taxis were accessible, able to take wheelchair passengers. In late 2005, the iconic, high floor AEC Routemaster buses were withdrawn from service, making London one of the first major cities in the world to have an accessible, low floor bus fleet – 10 years ahead of the national requirement.

Since 2000, Transport for London (TfL) has made substantial efforts to improve accessibility, with station upgrades and new infrastructure such as the Elizabeth line increasing the number of step-free stations on the TfL network. 95 Underground stations (34%) and 63 Overground stations (54%) have step-free access, (Note: This does not differentiate between step-free access from "street to train" or "street to platform") with all new Underground stations since 1999 opened as accessible stations. Work to increase the number of accessible stations further is underway. Other transport services such as Docklands Light Railway, Tramlink and the Elizabeth line are fully accessible, with step-free access at every stop or station.

== Background ==
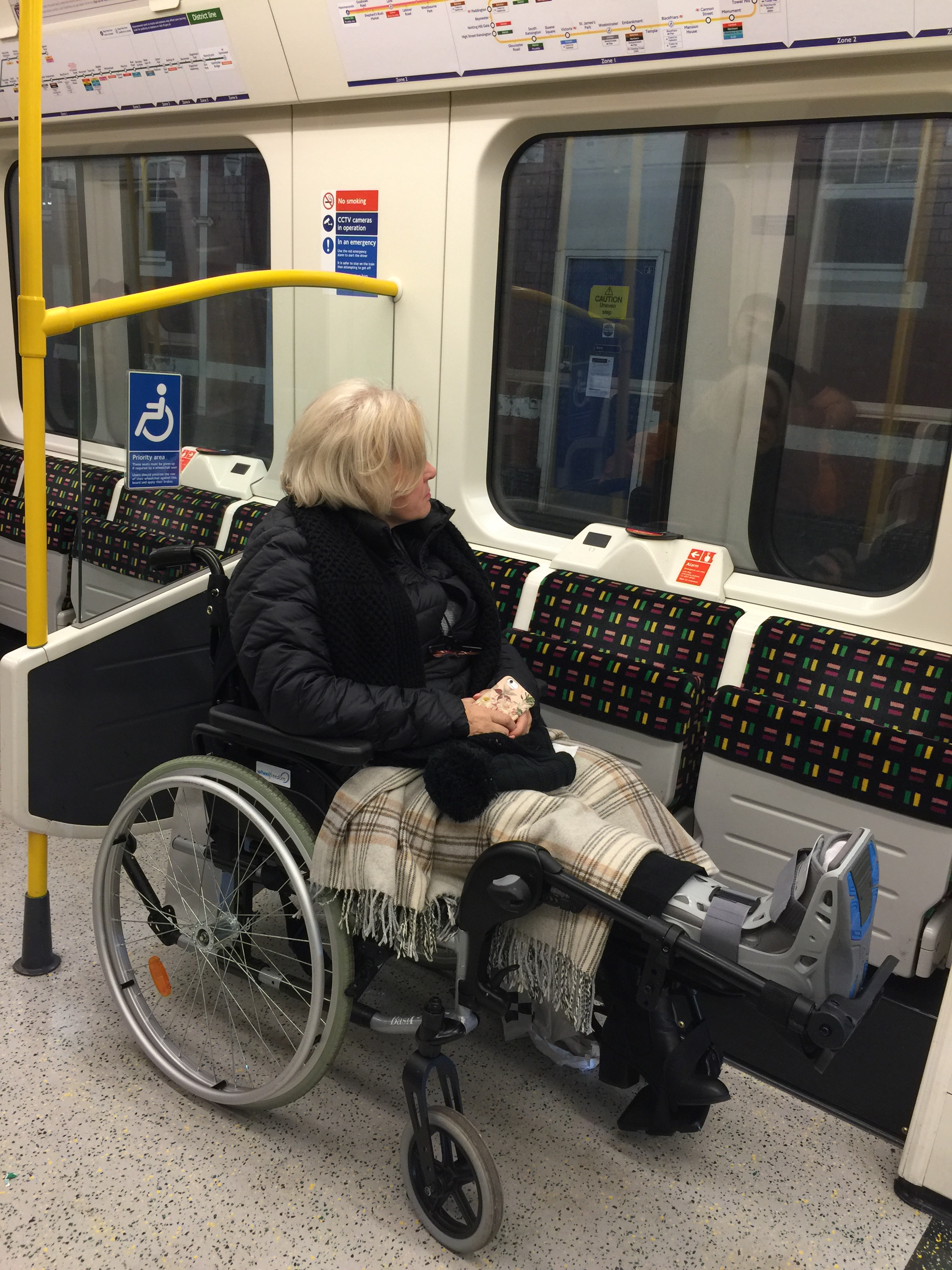
A wheelchair user on a Tube train

As of the 2021 census, 1.2 million Londoners have a disability – a "physical or mental impairment that has a substantial and long-term negative effect on their ability to carry out normal day-to-day activities". The 2021 census also indicated that there are 1 million people aged over 65 in London, and over 137,000 people aged over 85. The number of older people in London is expected to rise over the next 30 years. Older people are also much more likely to be disabled – with around a third of Londoners aged 65 and over. In 2012, TfL stated that 4.9 million trips a day are taken by passengers carrying heavy luggage, 1.5 million by people travelling with a small child (with buggy) and 0.7 million by those aged over 74. A total of 7.1 million trips a day are made by somebody with at least one of these barriers to mobility.

Accessibility of the public transport network allows people to travel freely at a time of their choice. Examples of disabled people that benefit from improved accessibility include people that use a wheelchair, people with limited mobility, people who are blind or visually impaired, people with impaired hearing and people with learning disabilities. Examples of other groups that benefit from improved accessibility include older people, people who have English as a second or foreign language, people with travelling with small children and people travelling with heavy luggage or shopping.

Accessibility is more than lifts, ramps and dropped kerbs – it also includes the consideration of inclusive design, ensuring that communication is accessible to all, and that staff are well trained. TfL also notes their desire to make journeys "pleasant", and give people the confidence to travel.

== History ==
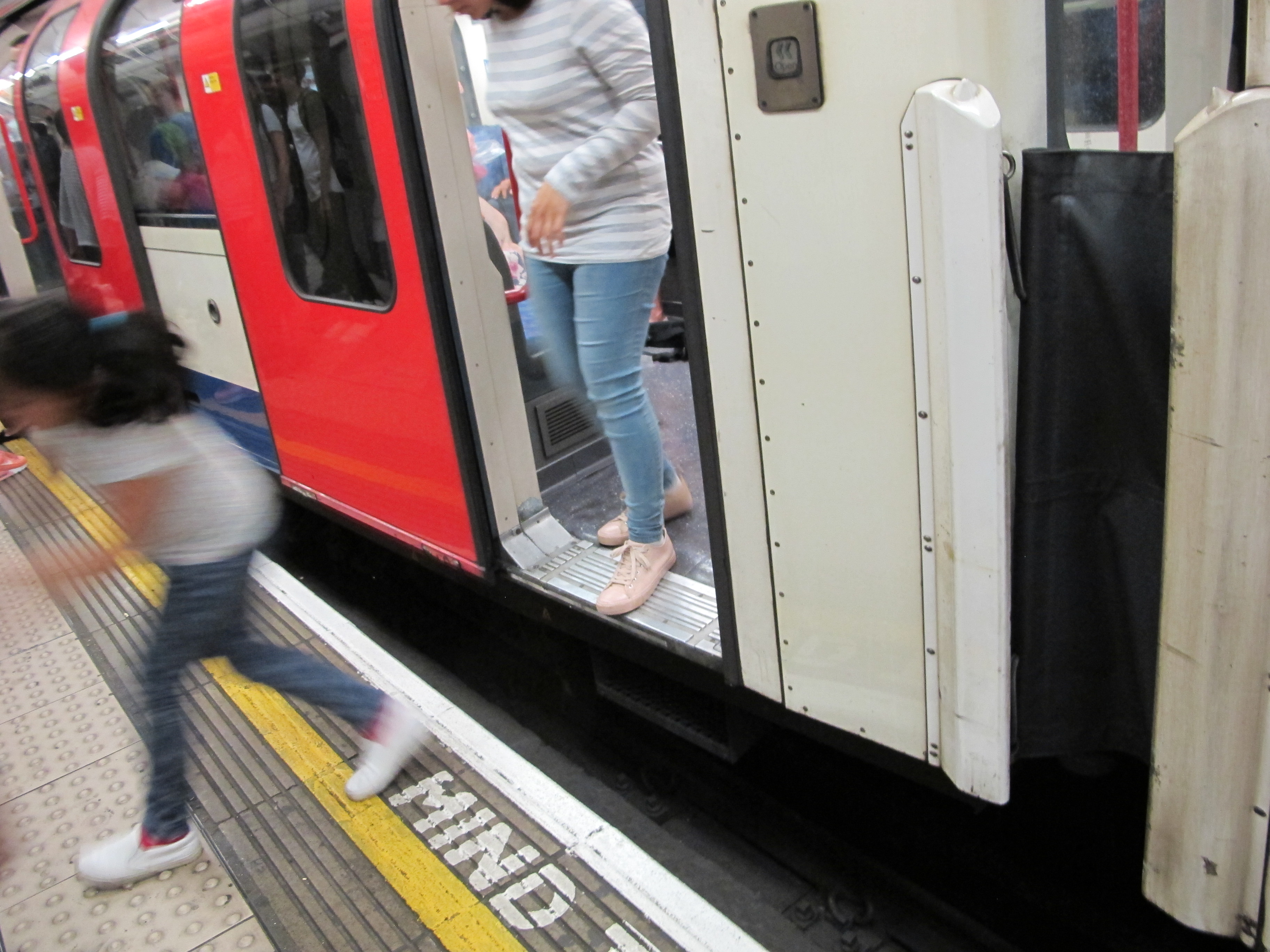
Large platform gap at Bank Underground station

In the first half of the 20th century, no special provisions for the disabled were provided by London transport authorities. Until 1959, London Transport required blind passengers or disabled people "wishing to travel independently" to sign an indemnity accepting financial liability from any accident. In 1968, London Underground began using automated warnings for passengers to "Mind the gap", as many Underground stations have horizontal and/or vertical gaps between the train and the platform.

The Chronically Sick and Disabled Persons Act 1970 placed a legal obligation on local authorities to provide access to public buildings for the disabled. However, the act did not include access to public transport. The Victoria line, completed in 1971, did not consider access for the disabled – with no lifts provided at stations. For comparison, new rapid transit projects built at the same time elsewhere included facilities for the disabled, with the Bay Area Rapid Transit (BART), Washington Metro and Tyne & Wear Metro providing lifts from opening in 1972, 1976 and 1980 respectively. In 1973, the Greater London Council began offering the Freedom Pass, a London wide concessionary travel pass which was initially only accepted on buses and for pensioners.

=== 1980s ===
During the International Year of Disabled Persons in 1981, London Transport worked with disability groups to publish an accessible guide to the public transport network for the first time. Chairman of London Transport Peter Masefield expressed a willingness to improve facilities for the disabled, but noted the challenge and costs of doing so. In 1982, London Transport permitted wheelchair users to use above-ground sections of deep Tube lines during off-peak hours, having previously relaxed rules to allowing wheelchair passengers to use the District, Circle and Metropolitan lines. This allowed wheelchair users to use 70% of the network, though travel through the deep-level tunnels was still prohibited over fears wheelchairs could hinder emergency evacuation.

Following the London Regional Transport Act 1984, London Regional Transport (LRT) was obliged to provide public transport services for the disabled. The London Transport Unit for Disabled Passengers was set up in 1984. This body worked throughout LRT to ensure that public transport became more accessible over time, as well as helping to train staff in offering assistance. New LRT buildings were built with the disabled in mind – with Harrow bus station including a disabled toilet and dropped kerbs in the design. LRT promised that future rail and bus station renovation and modernisation work would take into account the needs of the disabled and those with impaired sight or hearing – with the introduction of hearing loops at ticket offices (which transmits audio to hearing aids), installation of better platform seating and improved public announcements. Training was also introduced for staff on how to help passengers with disabilities.

In the early 1980s, Dial-a-Ride services were introduced by local boroughs across London to provide door-to-door transport for the disabled. Dial-a-Ride was expanded London-wide by 1985, subsidised by a grant from London Transport initially costing around £5 million a year.

In November 1984, LRT began trialling bus routes that used buses specifically designed to cater for those with disabilities. These routes would later become "Mobility Buses". From 1986, the design of regular buses was also modified, with non-slip handrails, illuminated stopping signs and additional steps at bus doors to reduce the step height – making it easier to access the bus. In 1988, kneeling buses were trialled on route 42 – the modified Leyland National bus had air suspension that lowered at bus stops to give a significantly reduced ground clearance. By 1988, buses that operated the Airbus routes to Heathrow Airport had been modified to allow two passengers in wheelchairs.

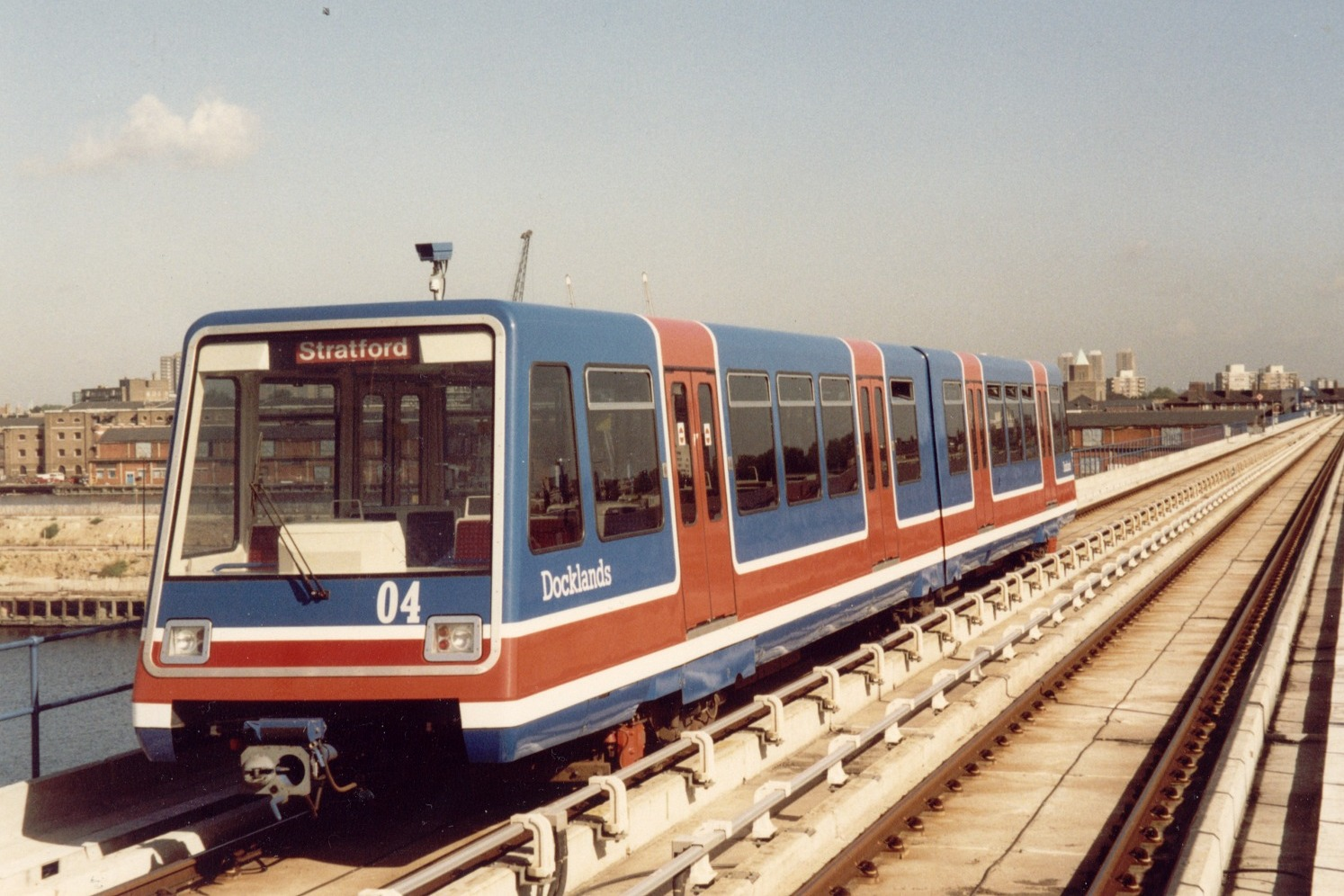
The Docklands Light Railway (DLR) first opened in 1987, with lifts provided at all stations.

In 1986, the Greater London Association for Disabled People (GLAD) pushed for "a radical reappraisal" of accessible transport in a report – with over 465,000 Londoners unable to (or find it extremely challenging) to use public transport. GLAD considered that the ban on wheelchairs on the Underground should be reconsidered, and criticised the removal of bus conductors as it has "eliminated much of the personal assistance available" to disabled people. LRT responded by welcoming the evidence the GLAD report provided, while pointing out the high cost of delivering accessibility improvements in light of limited funds.

In 1987, the Docklands Light Railway (DLR) opened, serving 16 stations across Docklands and East London. The DLR was the first major railway infrastructure project in Britain where full access for the disabled was considered from the start, with level access into the train from platforms and lifts at all stations. Although wheelchairs were permitted on many parts of the Underground, and that some stations were already accessible due to their level access, the LRT Board decided that the ban on wheelchairs at deep-level sections of the Underground would continue for safety reasons.

In 1987, the MCW Metrocab became the first accessible black cab model in London. From February 1989, all newly licensed black cabs were required to be able to take a passenger in a wheelchair.

=== 1990s ===
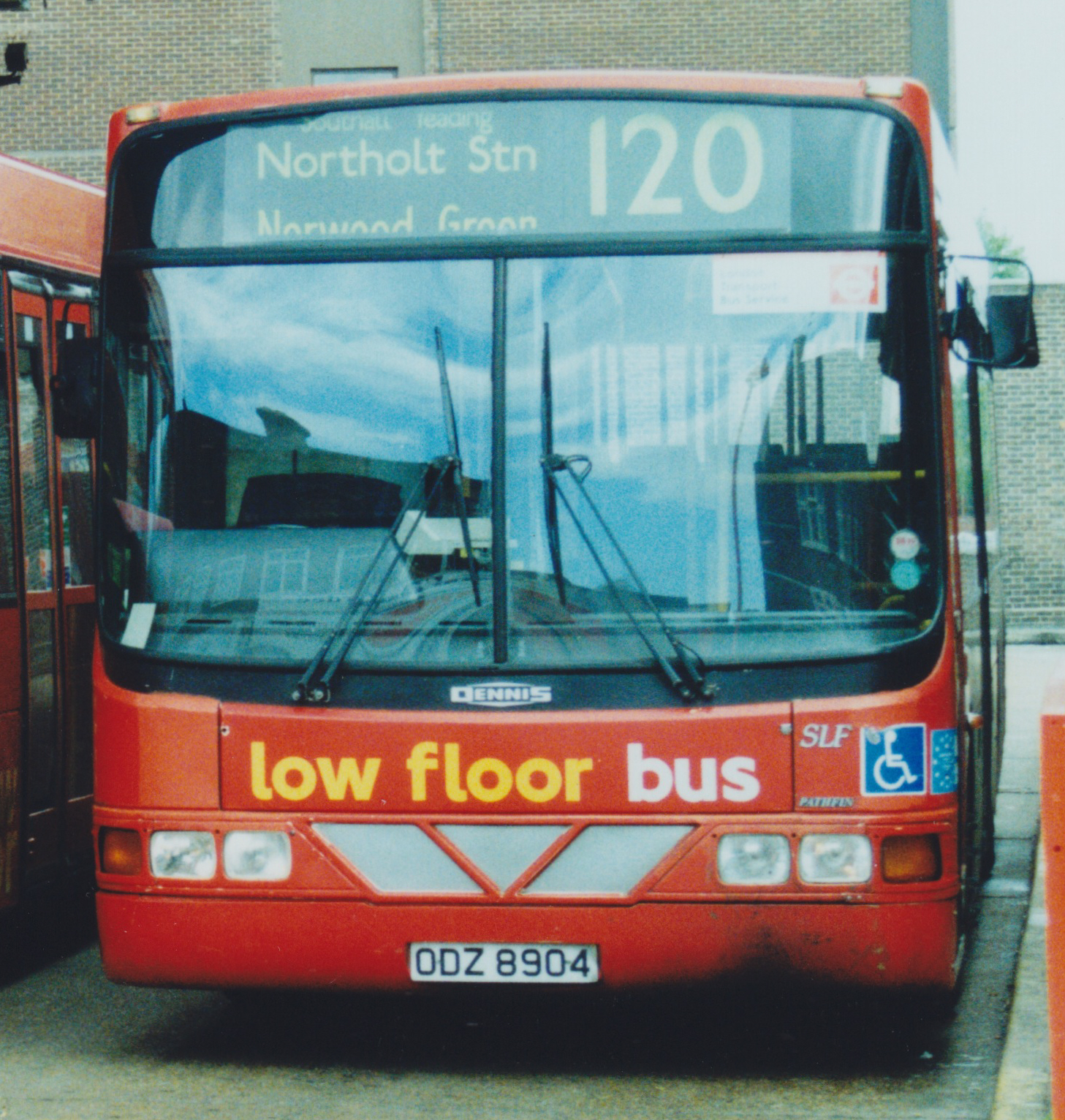
First low-floor bus route in London

In the early 1990s, Campaign for Accessible Transport – led by disability rights groups such as the Disabled People's Direct Action Network (DAN) – was set up to protest and lobby for increased access to public transport. For many disabled people, the only public transport option available was Dial-a-Ride, as buses were not accessible. DAN protesters blocked buses on Oxford Street, Trafalgar Square and other locations across London by handcuffing or chaining themselves to buses, as well as placing themselves in the path of buses and refusing to move. On several occasions in 1994 and 1995, during the consideration of the Disability Discrimination Act, protesters handcuffed themselves to a Routemaster bus by the Palace of Westminster.

In October 1992, the rebuilt Hillingdon tube station was the first station to have lifts for disabled access included in its design. From 1 October 1993, wheelchair access on the deep level Tube lines was permitted for the first time, following changes to London Underground's conditions of carriage. It was estimated that around 40 stations were accessible, however obstacles such as gaps between trains and platforms remained. Research by London Transport suggested that a step-free Underground would raise ridership by around 5%. London Underground applied for Millennium Commission funding to make five existing stations on the Jubilee line accessible, stating that they wanted to "add access for the disabled, and people with pushchairs and heavy shopping". This funding did not materialise.

Stationlink, the accessible bus route connecting central London mainline railway stations with each other was relaunched in 1993, replacing the Carelink branding. The hourly bus service used midibuses fitted with wheelchair lifts, allowing accessible connections across London at a lower cost than a taxi.

Work to make buses more accessible continued in the 1990s, with low-floor single decker buses trialled and tested on various bus routes across London from 1992. In 1993, route 88 became the first in London to use kneeling buses, making access easier. In 1994, route 120 became the first bus route in the United Kingdom to solely use accessible, low-floor buses. From 1996, significant numbers of low-floor single decker buses were ordered by bus operators, replacing older high-floor buses. In 1998, route 242 became the first low-floor double decker route in London. Low-floor buses were gradually rolled out on bus routes across London, with over 900 in service by 1998, and the last high-floor bus entering service in 1999.

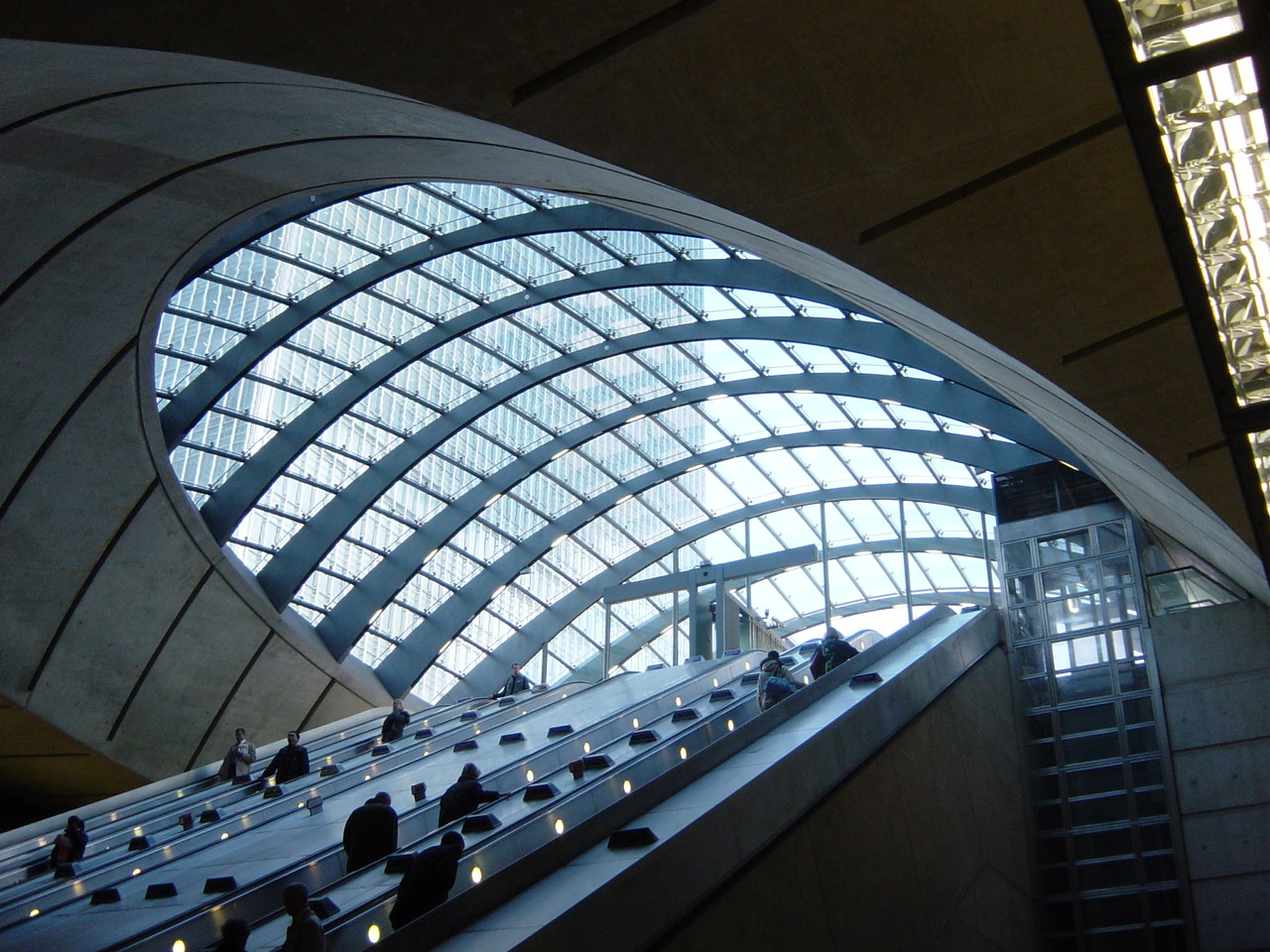
Canary Wharf station entrance, with glazed lift shaft on right

In 1995, the Disability Discrimination Act was passed. This required that London Transport make "reasonable adjustments" to anything that makes it unreasonably difficult for disabled people to use services like the Underground and buses. However, laws preventing discrimination on transport would not come into force until 2005. The Disability Discrimination Act was later absorbed into the Equality Act 2010. In June 1998, Heathrow Express, an airport rail link connecting Heathrow Airport and London Paddington opened, with level access to the trains at stations.

In 1999, the Jubilee Line Extension opened as the first major extension of the Underground in 30 years. During the design stage of the extension in the early 1990s, it was agreed that lifts would be provided at stations so that access for the disabled would be provided. The opening of the extension significantly increased the number of accessible Underground stations, with 34 lifts provided across the 11 stations, providing step-free access from street to train. Although the architecture was praised, disability campaigners noted concerns regarding the lack of colour contrast, and slight gaps between the train and the platform. A spokesperson for the Underground admitted that "not enough attention was paid to the needs of the disabled" during the design of the extension, and promised efforts to improve colour contrast in stations. London Transport also expressed their desire to increase the number of accessible stations over time.

=== 2000s ===
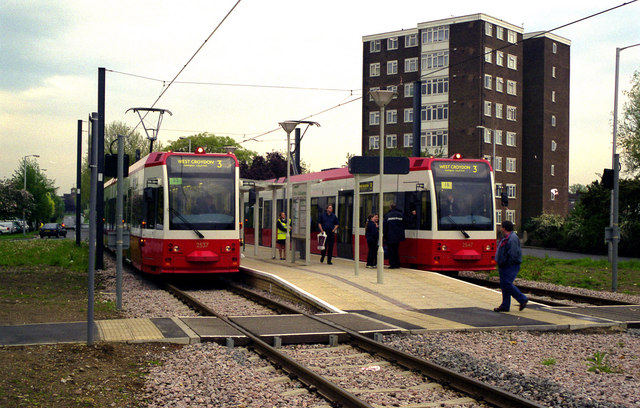
Croydon Tramlink, a low-floor tram opened in 2000

In 2000, Ken Livingstone was elected the first Mayor of London, and Transport for London (TfL) was founded as part of the formation of the Greater London Authority (GLA). The Greater London Authority Act 1999 obliged the GLA to promote "equality of opportunity" for all. The London Transport Unit for Disabled Passengers was subsumed into TfL. TfL outlined the changes and improvements it wished to make to the transport system to make it more accessible – including more low-floor buses, adding step-free access to key Tube stations and improving Dial-a-Ride.

On 1 January 2000, non-accessible London taxis were no longer permitted to be used, and the fleet became fully accessible. In May 2000, Croydon Tramlink opened after several years of construction. Serving Croydon and surrounding areas of South London, it was the first modern tram project in London, with low-floor trams and low platforms allowing accessibility for all.

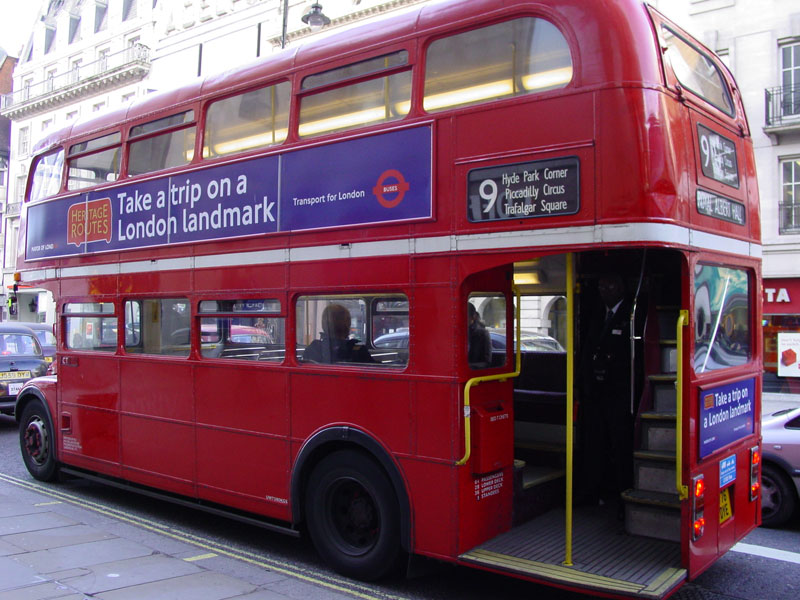
The high-floor open platform of an AEC Routemaster bus, withdrawn from service in 2005

Livingstone was initially supportive of retaining the iconic, yet high floor AEC Routemaster buses and their conductors, reintroducing 49 refurbished buses into service. However, Livingstone decided to replace them with low-floor buses, following a campaign by disabled rights groups, the large number of people injured by falling off the open rear platform and a realisation of the difficulty of trying to use high-floor buses with his children. In March 2003, Peter Hendy, then managing director of Surface Transport for TfL noted that the implementation of a low floor, accessible bus fleet was a higher priority than keeping the historic Routemaster buses. Despite criticism from the media and the public, remaining Routemaster services were consequently replaced from August 2003 onwards by low-floor double decker or articulated "bendy" buses. The last Routemaster buses were replaced with low-floor buses in December 2005. The last services were greeted by crowds of bus enthusiasts, as well as disability rights protesters welcoming the withdrawal. By early 2006, all London bus routes were fully accessible – 10 years ahead of the national requirement – thanks to the largest low-floor bus fleet in the world. Disability campaigners welcomed the low-floor buses, but noted that further improvements were required – as they experienced buses that did not get close enough to the kerb, broken wheelchair ramps and inaccessible bus stops.

In 2002, TfL published "Unlocking London for All", with plans to make the Underground more accessible, with a core network of accessible tube stations. It proposed that with more than 100 stations would be made step-free by 2020 (around 35 per cent of the network). Maps were also made available, indicating where lifts were present on the network. In May 2003, line diagrams on Jubilee line trains began using a wheelchair pictogram to denote stations with step-free access. At the mayor's Disability Capital Conference in December 2003, the Commissioner of Transport for London Bob Kiley stated that TfL wanted to "aggressively" improve access, including making half of the 280 Tube stations accessible by 2015.

In April 2004, London Underground was warned by disability campaigners that individuals could take legal action if efforts to improve accessibility did not take place. Disability Rights Commission noted that it would much prefer accessibility improvements rather that taking London Underground to court. TfL also expressed their desire to "make 25 per cent of Tube stations step-free" by 2010, and to 50 per cent by 2015. TfL later revised their target to achieve "one third of Tube stations [to] have step-free access by 2013". In March 2005, TfL launched a "baby on board" badge for pregnant travellers – to help other passengers to offer them a seat.

In July 2005, London was awarded the 2012 Olympic and Paralympic Games, with the candidature file noting that a constraint was the lack of accessibility at all London Underground stations. Accessibility improvements were planned at stations that would serve games venues, including Green Park, Southfields and Stratford stations. In December 2005, the DLR was extended to serve London City Airport, adding four new accessible stations in the Royal Docks.

In 2006, Department for Transport published the Railways for All Strategy, which set out the government's desire to improve access to the rail network for disabled people. The strategy included the "Access for All" programme, which provides funding to make existing National Rail stations accessible. Two major railway interchange stations – Clapham Junction and Lewisham – were among 15 selected for accessibility improvements.

In 2007, TfL established the Independent Disability Advisory Group, with disabled people providing recommendations to TfL as a critical friend. In October 2007, dial-a-ride fares were abolished, at a cost of £700,000 a year. In December 2007, TfL was given an award by disabled rights organisation Breakthrough UK, for TfL's work on making transport in London more accessible. Accepting the award, Ken Livingstone paid tribute to the disabled groups who campaigned for accessibility. Following work to make the bus and taxi fleets fully accessible, Livingstone noted that TfL were "addressing the far more expensive and longer term job" of making the Underground fully accessible.

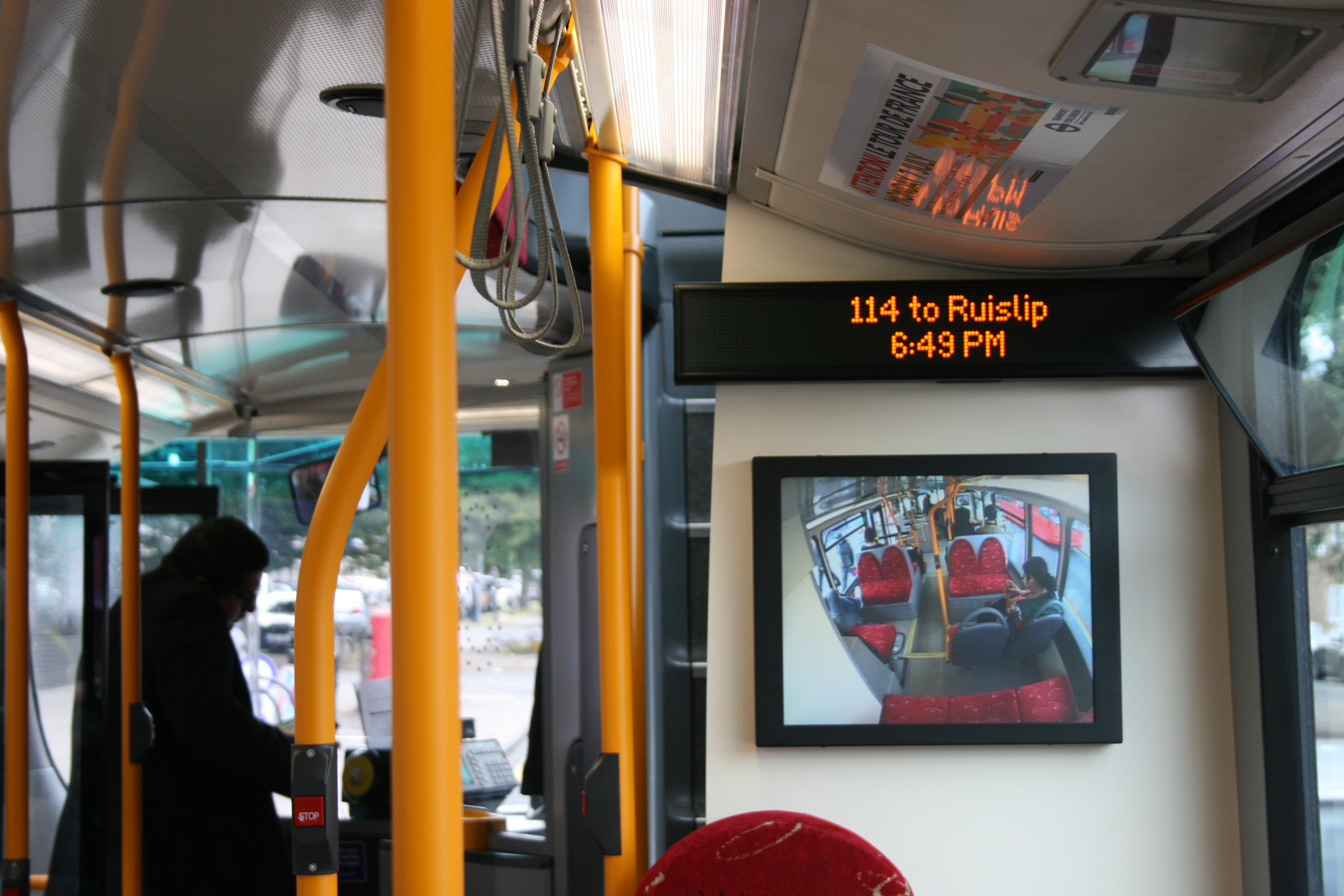
iBus displays on London Buses convey stop, destination and additional information to passengers.

Following tests and trials, London buses were fitted with the iBus system, giving audio-visual announcements of bus stops and other information to passengers. The completion of the iBus installation in 2009 was welcomed by the Guide Dogs for the Blind Association, who stated that the announcements give "confidence to use the bus network". The association noted that they were working with other campaign groups to push for announcements on buses across the UK. The Royal National Institute for Deaf People criticised TfL for relying "too much on audible information", with TfL responding that substantial investments were being made to improve public transport for disabled people.

Between 2003 and the late 2000s, the infrastructure of London Underground was maintained by Tube Lines and Metronet as part of a public–private partnership (PPP). Outside of a few major projects (such as Wembley Park), station refurbishments delivered as part of the PPP included minor accessibility improvements such as fixing stairs, visual contrast and the installation of tactile paving. London Underground began undertaking accessibility audits, to ensure that minor accessibility improvements were delivered alongside other works to stations. In 2007, Metronet collapsed following a spending overrun – with TfL subsequently cancelling accessibility improvements and station upgrades due to high costs.

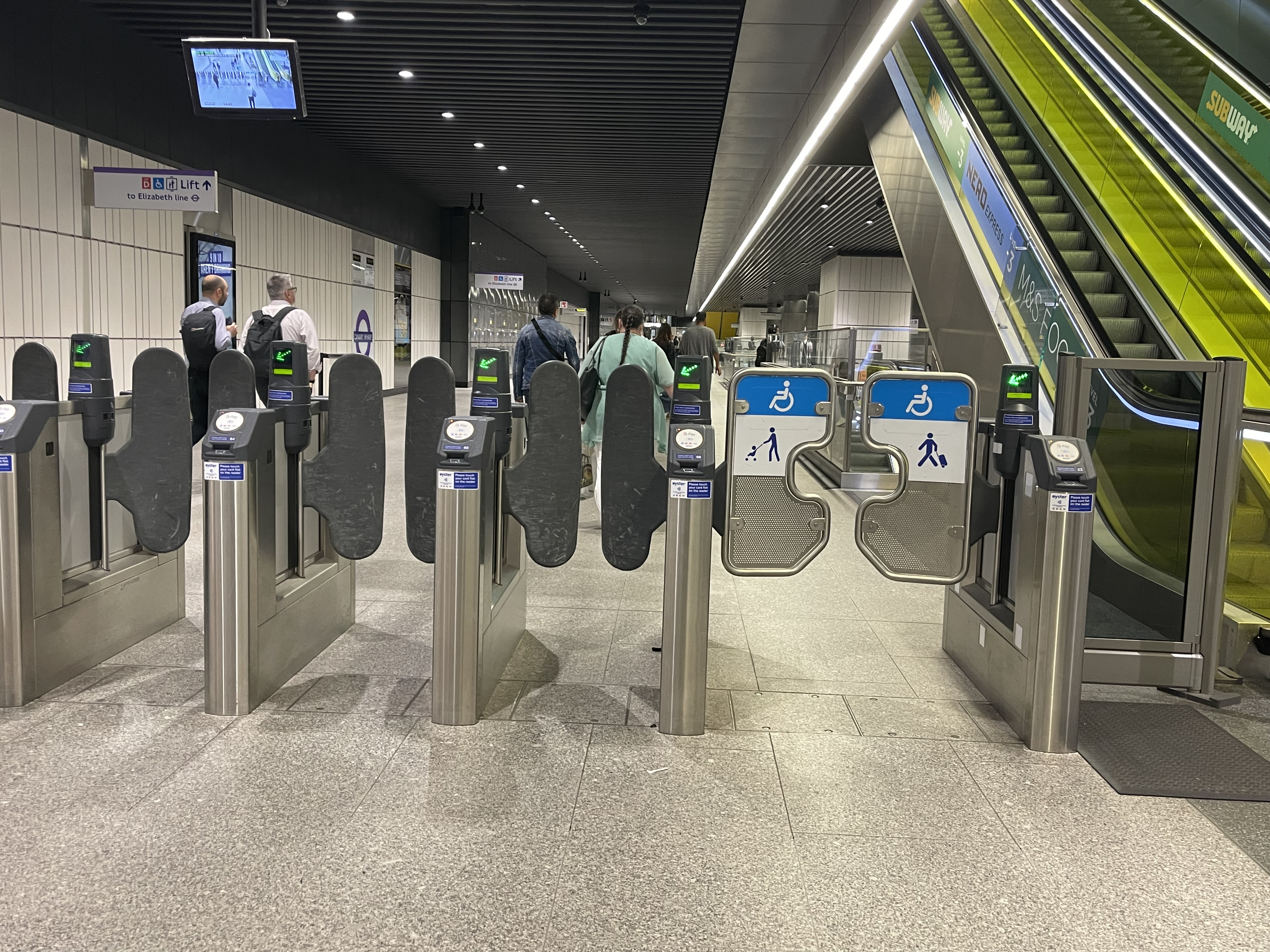
Ticket barriers at Canary Wharf station, with wide gate on the right

In March 2008, TfL began installing "wide aisle" ticket gates at stations across London at a cost of £12 million, improving access for wheelchair users, older people and people travelling with small children and/or luggage. The wide ticket gates would replace manually operated gates, with London Underground stating new gates will "enable and promote independent access". The installation followed trials at three stations in 2006, where disabled passengers stated that the wide gates "made them feel more equal" to other passengers. By 2014, wide ticket gates had been installed at 180 stations across the Underground network.

In May 2008, Boris Johnson was elected as Mayor of London, with Johnson subsequently cancelling many projects proposed by the previous mayor. The target of 33 per cent of step-free tube stations by 2013 was dropped, with TfL's business plan calling it an "unfunded commitment made by the previous administration". TfL subsequently deferred installation of step-free access at 21 stations, including at stations where construction had already started at a cost of £20 million. One example was Baker Street, where TfL decided that step-free access at the station was "not critical to the ... transport plan for the 2012 Olympic and Paralympic Games". The cancellations were criticised by disability campaign groups such as Transport for All. Explaining the decision to stop work, Johnson blamed the recession, the collapse of Metronet as well as unfunded promises made by the previous mayor, Ken Livingstone. Subsequently, the target of 25 per cent of tube stations being accessible by 2010 was missed.

In 2008, the refurbishment of Shepherd's Bush tube station as part of the opening of the Westfield London shopping centre in West London did not include the installation of lifts as originally planned. Explaining the cancellation of step-free access at the station, TfL cited high installation costs of £100 million due to the poor ground conditions and underground utilities which would have to be diverted. It later emerged that £39 million had already been spent on the installation of lifts at the station when the decision was taken to cancel. Leader of Hammersmith and Fulham Council Stephen Greenhalgh criticised TfL, stating that "it is inconceivable in the 21st century that you would revamp a station without putting in step-free access".

Following decades of discussions on the merits of the project, construction work on the Crossrail project began in 2009, with an estimated project cost around £16 billion. New stations would be built with step-free access, and some stations would be rebuilt to add step-free access to existing lines. However, some of the existing above ground stations would not be rebuilt with step-free access.

=== 2010s ===
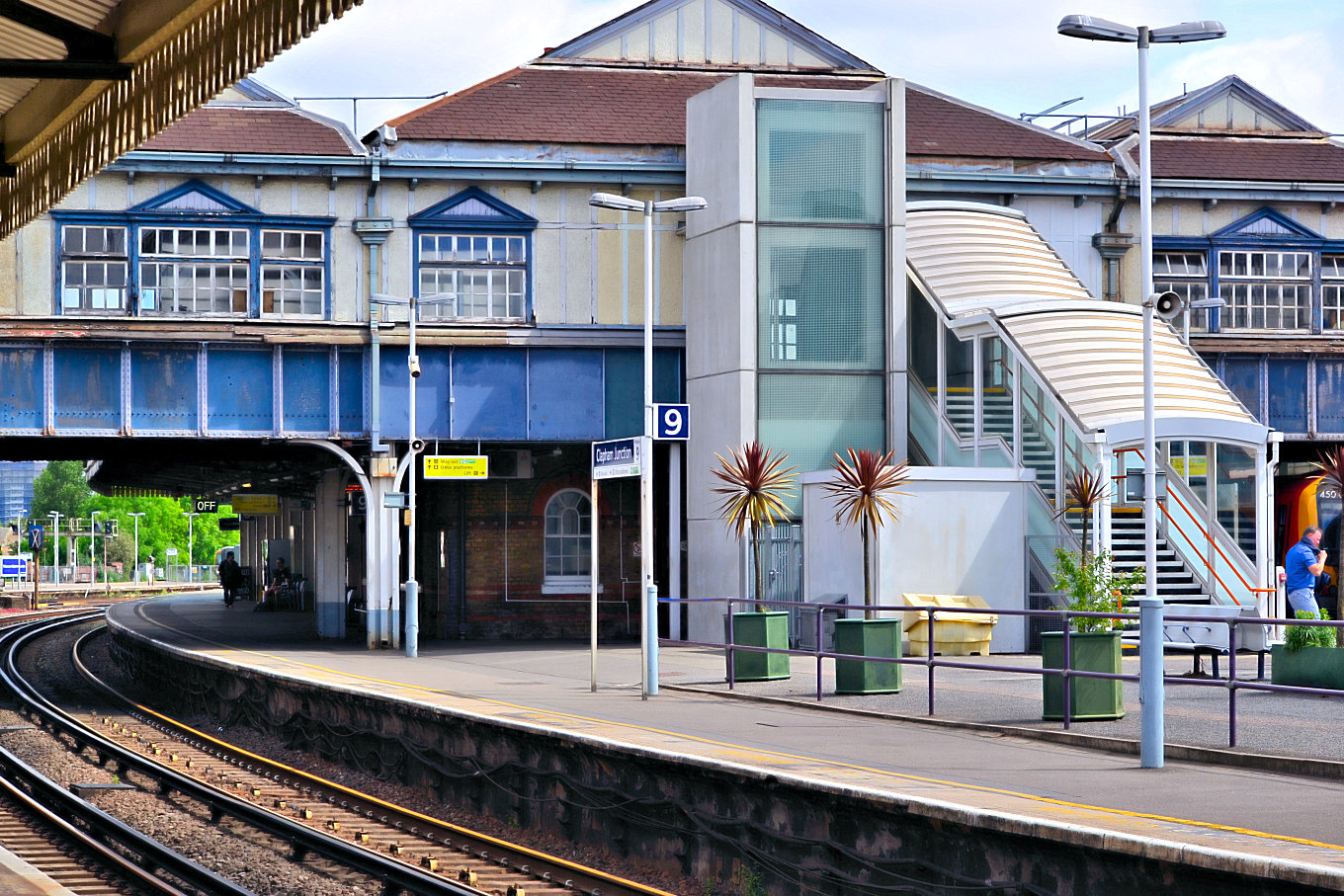
Lifts at Clapham Junction station

In April 2010, the East London line extension opened as part of London Overground, with four new accessible stations in east London. In September 2010, work to expand and rebuild King's Cross St Pancras tube station was completed at a cost of £810 million. The project included ten new lifts allowing step-free interchange between six Underground lines, access to street level as well as to Kings Cross and St Pancras railway stations. In May 2011, lift installation work was completed at Clapham Junction railway station, bringing step-free access to the busiest National Rail station in the UK for interchanges between services.

In November 2010, the London Assembly published a report on transport accessibility in London, detailing current issues and providing recommendations for TfL and the Mayor of London. The report detailed that a large amount of the transport network is inaccessible, with just 61 of 270 tube stations and around one-third of London's 300 railway stations having step-free access, and around half of London's bus stops meeting accessibility criteria. The report also stated that many Londoners with "reduced mobility live in areas where there is least provision" and that "the number of Londoners with reduced mobility is set to rise". The report recommended that TfL and the mayor should invest in improving accessibility (such as making more stations step-free), and consider short term, low cost enhancements (such as manual ramps at Underground stations and involving people with disabilities when training bus drivers). Transport for All welcomed the report, stating that it highlights "relatively inexpensive, simple steps that can be taken" to improve travel for disabled people. TfL denied it was "foot dragging", stating that improvements to accessibility were already underway and that the bus network was the "most accessible ... in the UK". TfL stated that recommendations of the report would be examined, but noted financial constraints limited what it could deliver.

A report on behalf of disability charity Scope detailed that "almost half" of disabled people experience discrimination on public transport. It also reported that nearly 40 per cent of disabled Londoners "felt they had been discriminated against by a bus driver", and 32 per cent of disabled Londoners felt they'd been "ignored by a taxi or bus they were trying to hail". Scope criticised the "backdrop of negativity" regarding disabled people, noting that discussions regarding welfare reform had "focused on disabled people as benefit scroungers". Transport for All said that the report showed why accessibility improvements needed to be more than removing physical obstacles, and that improved training of staff was required.

In 2011, the conceptual New Routemaster bus was criticised by Transport for All, noting that the wheelchair area was too small. Before introduction of the bus, TfL made changes to improve the design, including repositioning seats and hand poles to improve access to the wheelchair space. TfL admitted failing to consult with disabled groups on the design. In 2012, the first phase of the Thameslink Programme (improvements to a north–south rail link across central London) were completed, with step-free access provided at Farringdon and Blackfriars tube stations. During the 2012 London mayoral election campaign, Labour candidate Ken Livingstone pledged to make one-third of the stations on the Tube accessible, by targeting stations in outer London. Johnson criticised the proposal, calling it "unfunded". Johnson was re-elected as Mayor of London in May 2012.

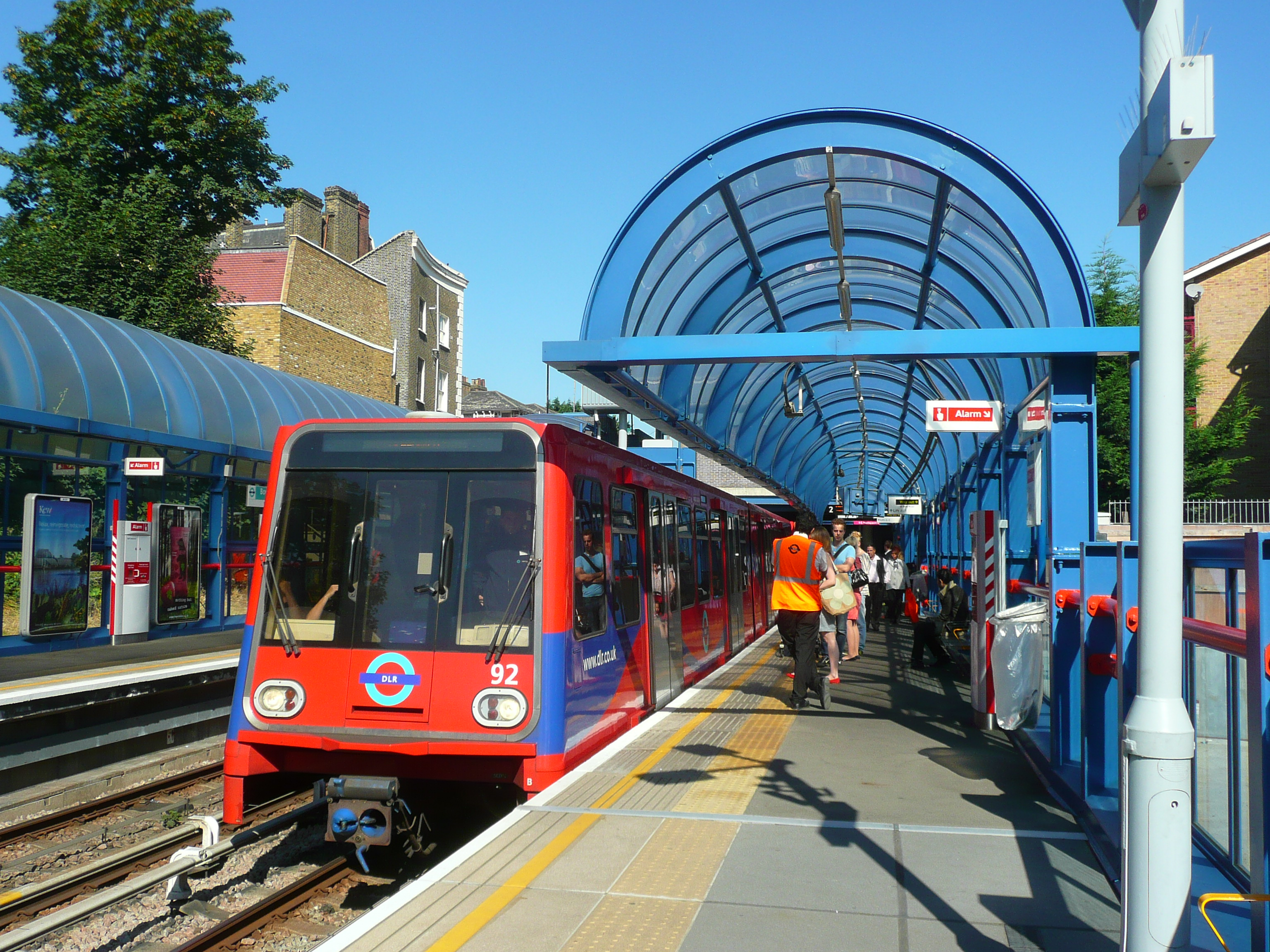
During London 2012, the fully accessible Docklands Light Railway (DLR) carried double as many passengers as usual.

In the summer of 2012, London hosted the Olympic and Paralympics Games, with TfL calling the transport network "one of the most accessible in the world". Record numbers of passengers used the transport network, over 30% more than usual – however the media did report challenges for some wheelchair users. The fully accessible DLR was singled out for praise, as it served both the Olympic Park and other competition venues in east London. During the Games, the DLR transported double its usual number of passengers. As part of preparations for the Games, organisers LOCOG and the Olympic Delivery Authority worked on an accessible transport strategy, as well as making substantial accessibility improvements to transport infrastructure including step-free access at Green Park, Heathrow and Stratford stations. Manual boarding ramps at Tube stations were kept following the Games, with TfL also stating that the Paralympics had made it change its approach to disabled users.

An investigation by Channel 4 showed that a target set by TfL in 2006 to achieve "one third of Tube stations [to] have step-free access by 2013" had been missed, with 66 stations (around 24 per cent) being accessible instead of the promised 90. TfL reiterated that it had been an "unfunded aspiration of the [Livingstone] administration", and that TfL had to manage severe financial constraints following the recession and collapse of the Tube PPP. TfL was further criticised when it was shown that step-free access investment would fall to zero in 2013, with Transport for All criticising a "lack of a ring-fenced budget for step-free access", commenting that "disabled people are denied a fundamental freedom: to travel as equal citizens". In December 2012, TfL announced an £18 million investment to make 95 per cent of London bus stops accessible over the next three years. In 2013, a new bridge at East Croydon railway station (the busiest National Rail station in London outside of fare zones 1 and 2) was opened, bringing step-free access to all platforms at a cost of £22 million.

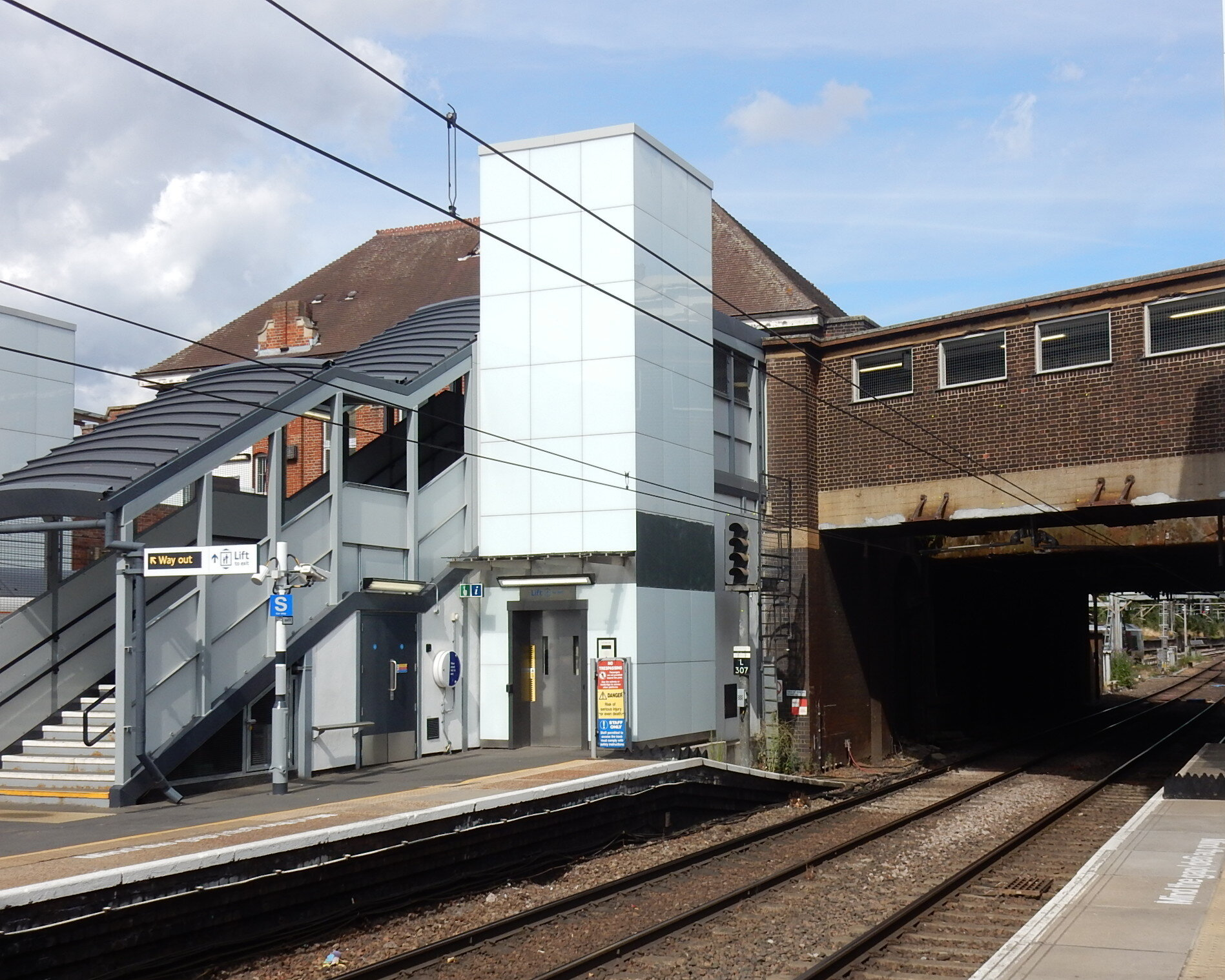
Lifts installed at Forest Gate station as part of the Crossrail project

In July 2013, Transport for All began campaigning to ensure step-free access at all Crossrail stations. It staged a protest on the one year anniversary of the Paralympic Games opening ceremony, being joined by other groups such as Disabled People Against Cuts. Transport for All stated "it is no longer acceptable for disabled and older people to be locked out of their local station" and that accessibility could be delivered "for as little as 0.2% of the ... [Crossrail] budget". An early day motion was also tabled by Ilford South MP Mike Gapes to push for the accessibility improvements. London's Transport Commissioner Mike Brown replied that TfL aim to make all Crossrail stations accessible, and that "work is underway [for] solutions and funding options" for the seven stations without step-free access. In October 2013, TfL announced that four Crossrail stations in London (Seven Kings, Maryland, Manor Park and Hanwell) would be made accessible at a cost of £19 million, thanks to cost efficiencies and reallocated budget. In November 2014, the government announced that they would provide £14 million in funding for the remaining three Crossrail stations (Langley, Taplow, Iver) to be made accessible. Transport for All called the announcements an "amazing campaign win".

In 2014, campaign groups and trade unions expressed concerns regarding planned closure of Tube ticket offices, voicing fears that it would make transport for disabled people more difficult. BBC News reported staff shortages meant that tube lifts were closed 162 times in 2013, with staff shortages tripling in number since 2009. Further information showed that lifts at Westminster station had been closed 99 times due to lift failures, with data showing the lifts along the Jubilee line were "particularly badly hit" by failures. Transport for All noted concerns that staff cuts would exacerbate these lift closures. Despite strikes from trade unions, ticket office closures began in 2015 with TfL reiterating that all stations would remain staffed and staff would be more visible and available to assist passengers.

In October 2014, Paralympic champion and wheelchair racer Hannah Cockroft challenged the mayor, Boris Johnson, to spend a day in a wheelchair, claiming "wheelchair access on the tube is so bad" the mayor would not be able to attend all his appointments. Johnson declined the challenge, responding that he knows that the "picture for disabled people travelling in the capital is far from perfect". He thanked Cockroft for her efforts to highlight accessibility challenges, and asked TfL to work with her to understand her specific challenges. Johnson later announced a £75 million fund that would be used to match contributions from local councils and property developers to deliver step-free access at stations.

In March 2015, Pimlico tube station was chosen to be the test site station for "Wayfindr", an app that helps visually impaired people navigate their way through the station using iBeacon devices. The trial was successful, which subsequently led to a £700,000 grant from Google, and the app was installed at other stations. In October 2015, the first inclined lift on the Underground was installed at Greenford, adding step-free access to the station. In April 2016, a report by Muscular Dystrophy UK showed that it takes disabled people four times longer to complete common journeys on the Underground, with the report criticising the lack of accessible stations in central London.

In May 2016, Sadiq Khan was elected Mayor of London, promising to "improve accessibility at rail and tube stations", consider accessibility when developing and maintaining the transport network, and ensure that transport workers "understand the needs of disabled and older passengers". Following the election, the mayor announced a £200 million investment in transport accessibility to make an 30 additional stations step-free over a 5-year period. Campaigners strongly welcomed the announcement, calling it a "victory" and noting it would help families to travel around London.

In 2017, TfL began offering a "please offer me a seat" badge for people with hidden disabilities, following the success of the "baby on board" badge introduced in 2005. Following research that showed that people did not give up seats to those who needed it, TfL began encouraging passengers to look for others who may need their seat. On some Underground and Overground trains, priority seating was enhanced with moquette that indicated it was a priority seat. TfL began providing disability equality training for its staff in 2017, and began providing "distinctive and separate" accessible signage for passengers in 2018. In an interview with Construction News, TfL noted their increasing awareness that accessibility is more than just making stations step-free – noting that the passenger experience for someone with autism, or someone with a visual impairment or someone with mobility issues will be very different. TfL also noted that they have moved away from the "bare minimum of building regulations" and were working with disabled groups. TfL did caution that upgrading existing stations (particularly older ones) was challenging, owing to underground utilities and lack of space.

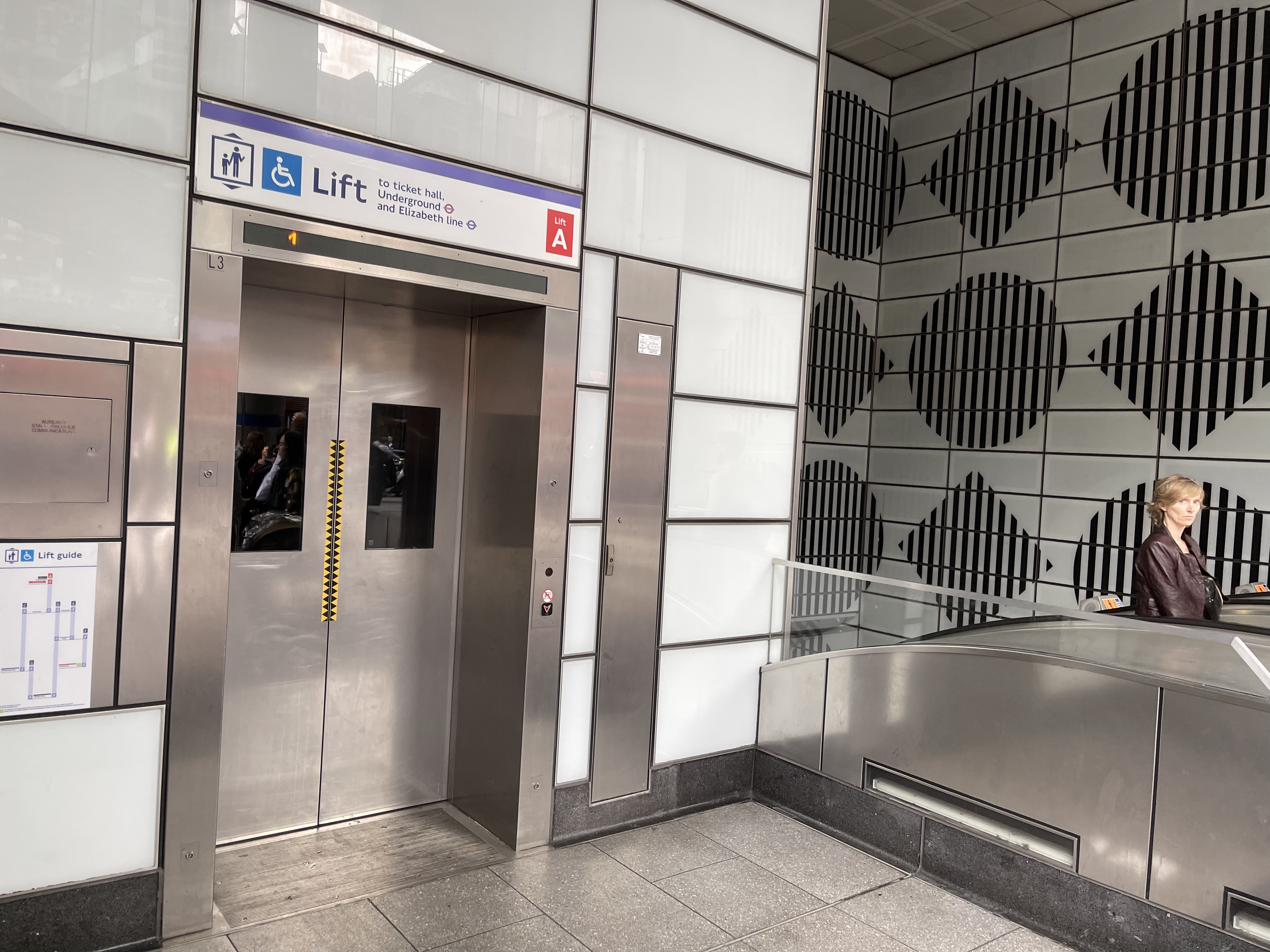
Tottenham Court Road gained step-free access to the Northern and Central line in 2017.

In the late 2010s, three major construction projects to expand and upgrade tube stations in central London were completed after years of construction. This projects included the addition of step-free access at all three stations. Work at Tottenham Court Road tube station was completed in February 2017 at a cost of £500 million, with five new lifts. Work at Bond Street tube station was completed in November 2017 at a cost of £300 million, with four new lifts. Work at Victoria tube station was completed in October 2018 at a cost of £700 million, with seven new lifts.

In 2018, the Department for Transport published a report that outlined government plans to make transport more inclusive and easier for disabled people. It set a goal that the UK's transport system will offer "equal access for disabled people" by 2030, with "assistance if physical infrastructure remains a barrier". In August 2018, chair of the London Assembly Transport Committee Caroline Pidgeon criticised Crossrail for building the central stations at a non-standard platform height of 1,100 mm (43.3 in). This would only allow step-free access from the new Class 345 trains at the central London and Heathrow stations, with accessible ramps required to access the train at stations outside London. Pidgeon stated that this lack of level boarding would make "journeys for people with disabilities unnecessarily complicated and burdensome". Following delays and cost overruns of the Crossrail project, TfL announced that the planned upgrade and expansion of Camden Town tube station (including the provision of step-free access) had been cancelled.

Research in 2019 showed that the average cost of adding step-free access to a station in London was around £10 million, significantly cheaper than American cities like Boston and New York City, but more expensive than European cities like Madrid and Berlin. In January 2019, the High Court of Justice found that London Underground discriminated against a disability campaigner, by failing to provide enough information on which lifts were working. The judge ruled that London Underground should make this information more widely available. London Underground apologised, acknowledged that "there's more to do" and stated that staff were now able to report broken lifts to the control centre. In March 2019, disability rights activist Alan Benson criticised the pace of improvements to transport accessibility since the London 2012 Olympic and Paralympic Games, and that disabled people must keep fighting for their right to travel on public transport. Benson praised the positive outcomes of training TfL in inclusion and designing for accessibility. TfL expressed their willingness to listen to criticism and suggestions, while noting that the lack of government funding made widespread improvements difficult. In May 2019, research showed that journeys in London take around twice as long for wheelchair users.

=== 2020s ===
In early 2020, works at Twickenham railway station to rebuild the entrance and provide step-free access was completed, after the initial deadline of the 2015 Rugby World Cup was missed.

In March 2020, the London Assembly published a report on accessible and inclusive transport in London, detailing issues and providing recommendations for TfL and the Mayor of London. The report detailed that travel for disabled people and older people is harder because of existing barriers, and that when a lift is broken or routes are unavailable, it "[exacerbates] the problems experienced" – making journeys longer or leaving people stranded. The report therefore recommended significant improvements to communication, including real time information about step-free access and staff assistance. The report also criticised the "inconsistent and unreliable" Dial-a-Ride and Taxicard services, recommending that TfL undertake a review to identify improvements. Other recommendations included that TfL should use disabled and older people to inform the planning and design of infrastructure and services in future, and that TfL, Network Rail and other transport operators work together on standardised training on disability, equality and inclusion. TfL subsequently launched a consultation regarding priorities for step-free access – querying if limited funds should be spent on installing step-free access at one complex station in central London, or at several small or medium-sized stations outside central London. The results of the consultation was published in 2022, with respondents noting that more accessible stations would lead to more journeys, and that they wished large "gaps" in the network without any step-free station to be filled. Respondents also noted stations that should be made step-free, including interchanges and stations in town centres.

In 2020, following a collapse in income due to the COVID-19 pandemic, TfL paused design work on future step-free access at Northolt, Burnt Oak and Hanger Lane stations. The planned upgrade and expansion of Holborn station (including the provision of step-free access) was also cancelled. These delays and cancellations were criticised by Transport for All, with TfL responding that the pandemic had a "catastrophic impact ... on TfLs finances". Delays to the completion of the Crossrail project were also criticised, with one wheelchair user noting they had specifically moved to Woolwich in anticipation of the opening of Crossrail.

In 2021, the Northern line extension to Battersea was opened, adding two new accessible stations in zone 1. Disability campaigners criticised the new stations, with Alan Benson stating that the lifts were too small and like a "squeezed-in afterthought". TfL apologised, stating that they were taking feedback onboard and making changes. London Assembly Member Siân Berry called the failings "disappointing", and Scope called the project a "missed opportunity". In 2022, TfL data showed that staff shortages at some stations were "repeatably" causing step-free access to be unavailable. Campaigners feared that passengers were "wrongly being told that [lifts] were faulty", however TfL insisted that it "always correctly announces the reason" if step-free access is not available.

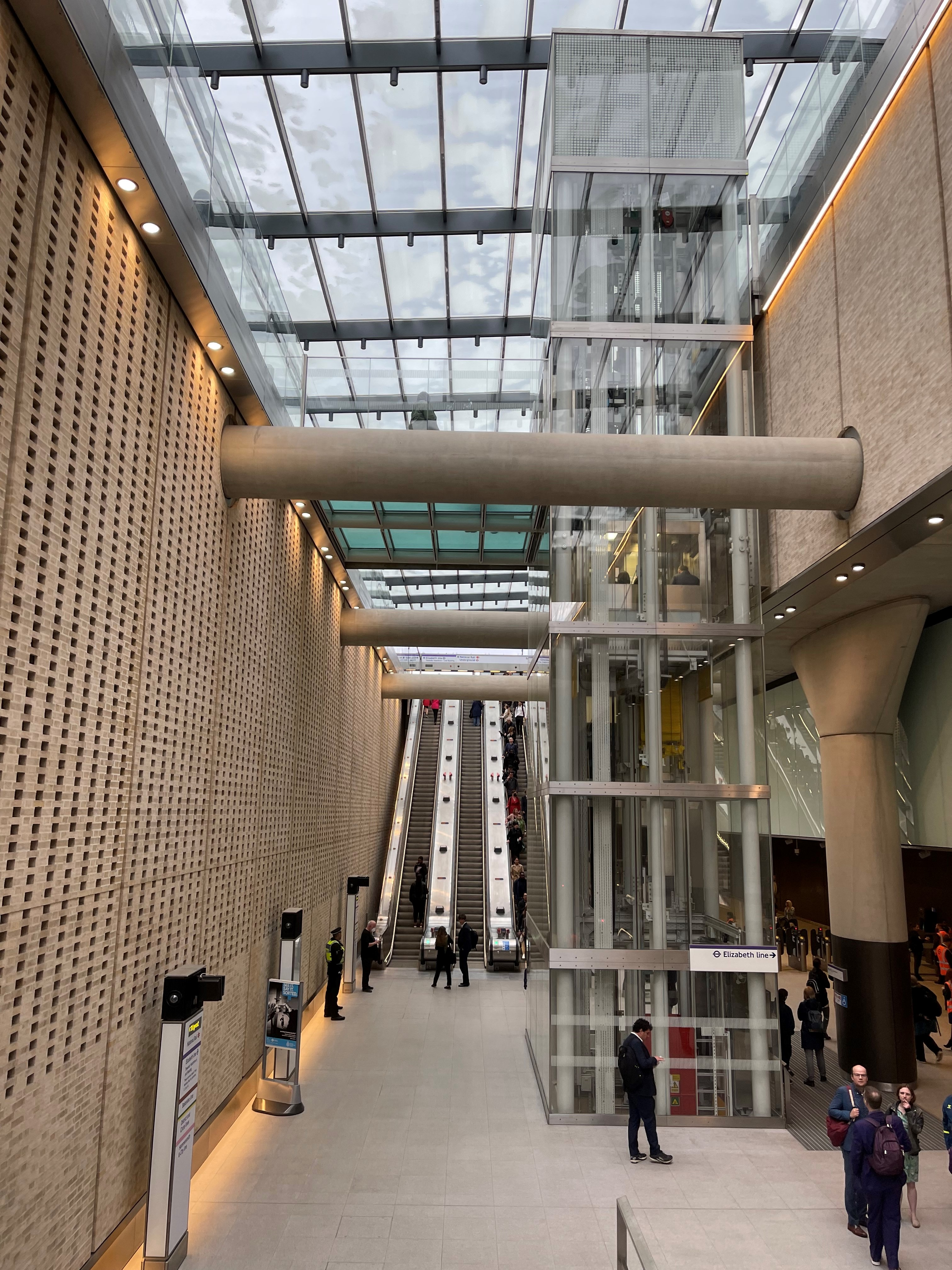
Paddington Elizabeth line station, which opened in May 2022

In May 2022, the central section of the Elizabeth line (built as the Crossrail project) opened, with 10 new stations in central and east London. All these stations included step-free access from street to train, with interchange stations such as Whitechapel also being made step-free. By May 2023, the Elizabeth line had been extended to the Great Eastern Main Line and Great Western Main Line – construction work included adding lifts and ramps to any non-accessible station on the route, however non-standard platform heights mean that level boarding is not possible at these outer stations and manual boarding ramps are required to board trains. Campaigners praised the effort that had gone into the design of the line, noting the "copious number of lifts" – however, the lack of level boarding at the outer stations was criticised. Concern was also raised that the future Old Oak Common station (to be built as part of the High Speed 2 project) would not have level boarding when it opens in the 2030s.

In February 2023, works to upgrade and expand Bank tube station was completed at a cost of £700 million. This included step-free access to the Northern line, and improved access to the DLR. Owing to the severe curvature of the Central line platforms, there is a substantial gap between the train and the platform. Because of this, no step-free access works were proposed for the Central line, as the cost would be prohibitive and it would be difficult for passengers to use.

In April 2023, step-free access works to the National Rail platforms at Finsbury Park station was completed, following completion of step-free access for the Underground station in 2019. In November 2023, a £249 million project to expand and upgrade Gatwick Airport railway station were completed, with five new lifts improving access to and from the airport terminals. In December 2023, £43 million of levelling-up funding to upgrade Colindale and Leyton stations was confirmed by the Government, with Colindale gaining step-free access in December 2025.

In February 2024, TfL published a new plan to make the transport network more inclusive and accessible. Commitments in the plan included increasing the number of stations with step-free access, adding priority seating moquette to buses, consideration of making communications available in British Sign Language and feasibility work into increasing public toilet provision. TfL announced that a pilot of "mini ramps" at stations had been successful, and that they would be rolled out to over 45 stations on the network. These "mini ramps" bridge where a small step or gap remains between the train and the platform. In August 2024, TfL announced that they would consider how best to make stations on the Northern line in south London accessible as part of step-free feasibility work.

In January 2025, Sadiq Khan noted at the London Assembly that "it will never be the case [...] that all of our underground stations will be step-free", with TfL explaining that at deep-level tube stations, constructing step-free access is difficult and in some cases "not "practically possible". In response, Transport for All called for "bold action" to improve transport accessibility, with more step-free access at stations, level boarding onto trains, and dropped kerbs on pavements.

In 2026, TfL announced that work would soon begin at South Kensington (the busiest tube station without any step-free access) to upgrade the station and make the Circle and District lines accessible. Part funded by TfL's property development arm Places for London, work is due to be completed by 2029. In February 2026, a London Assembly transport committee report criticised TfL for lacking depth and nuance in relation to accessibility. In September 2026, TfL trialled a "quiet space" at Ealing Broadway station for those finding their journey overwhelming and stressful to stop and think before continuing on their journey.

== London Underground ==
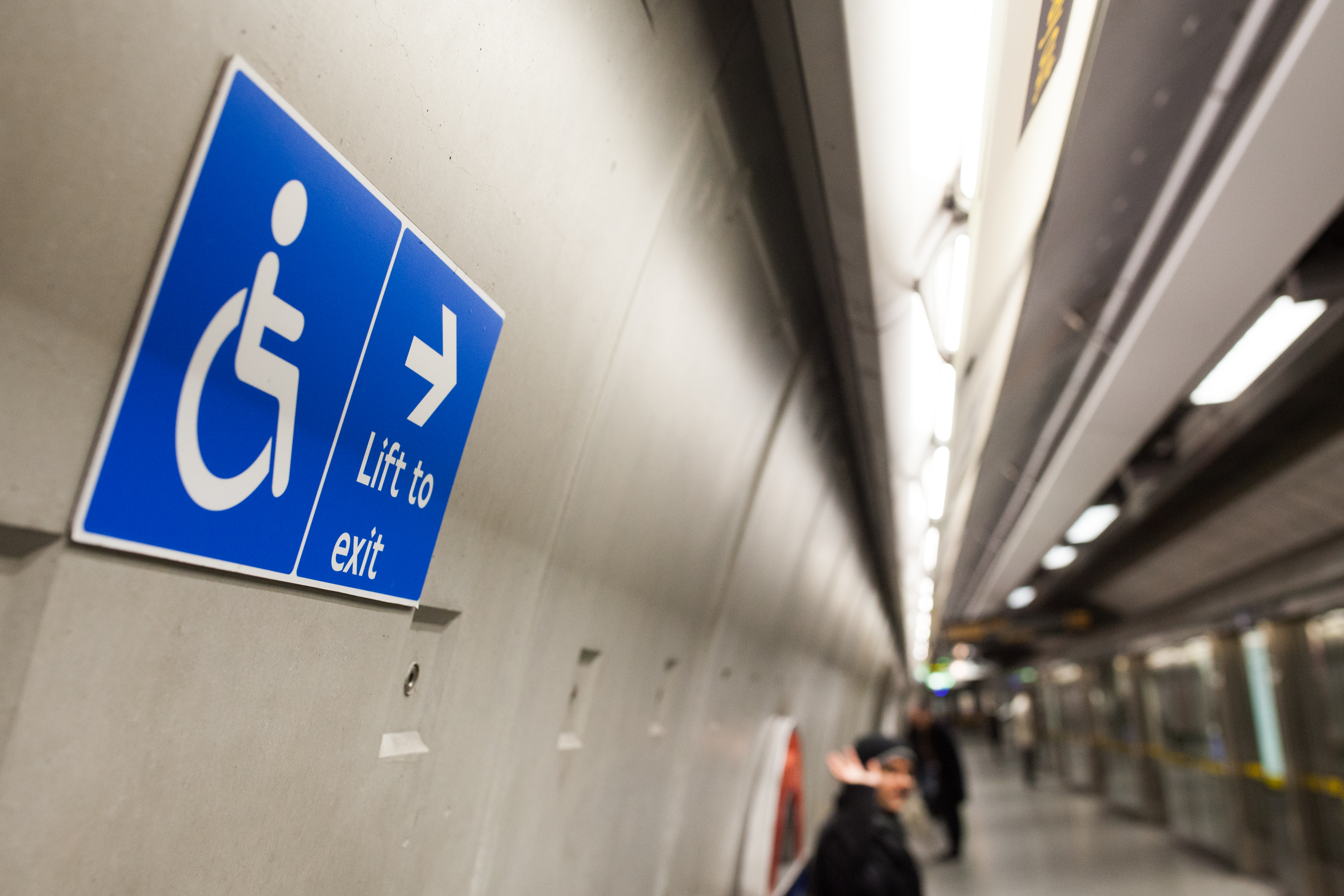
Sign showing direction towards lift

=== Stations ===
As of September 2026, 95 London Underground stations (34%) are accessible from street to platform level. Boarding ramps and raised platform humps are available at stations to allow access to the train where level access is not provided. Step-free access is provided by using lifts, inclined lifts, level access and ramps as appropriate for each station. All stations on the network feature minor accessibility features such as tactile platform strips, audiovisual passenger information, wide ticket gates, clear signage and help points with hearing loops. Stations with large gaps between the train and the platform warn passengers with the iconic "Mind the gap" announcement.

Because many older stations are deep below ground and were built before accessibility was a consideration, it is often difficult and expensive to install lifts into existing Underground stations. Many older stations such as Covent Garden station do have lifts, albeit with intermediate staircases to access the ticket hall or platforms. Consequently, these stations are not accessible, despite the use of lifts. Some stations have not required work to make them step-free – for example, the level access from street into Kew Gardens station, or the direct platform access from the lifts at the historic Caledonian Road station.

Since 2018, some stations have had their signs modified on a short-term basis, gaining income for TfL. Examples of this type of temporary name change include Bond Street station renamed "Burberry Street", Old Street station renamed "Fold Street" after Samsung Galaxy Fold, Southgate tube station renamed "Gareth Southgate" and Oxford Circus station renamed "Retail Therapy". This has been criticised as "messing around" and as "thoughtless PR stunts" by Transport for All.

In recent decades, major efforts have taken place to improve accessibility across the Underground, with the Jubilee line extension having lifts from opening in 1999, and key interchange stations such as King's Cross St Pancras, Victoria and Green Park becoming step-free. TfL work with developers to fund step-free access schemes when development occurs adjacent to stations.

Year	Underground station gained step-free access (Note: This table does not differentiate between step-free access from "street to train" or "street to platform")
1992	Hillingdon
1994	Hammersmith (District and Piccadilly lines)
1999	Tottenham Hale
1999	Westminster, Waterloo (Jubilee line), Southwark, London Bridge, Bermondsey, Canada Water, Canary Wharf, North Greenwich, Canning Town, West Ham (Jubilee line), Stratford (Jubilee line)
2003	Fulham Broadway, Willesden Junction, Harrow & Wealdstone
2004	West Ham (District and Hammersmith and City lines), Kilburn, East Ham, Hounslow East
2005	Brixton, Earl's Court
2006	King's Cross St Pancras (Circle, Metropolitan and Hammersmith & City lines), Wembley Park
2007	Morden
2008	Wood Lane, Roding Valley, Pinner, Oakwood, Hendon Central, Golders Green, Finchley Central, Acton Town, Heathrow Terminal 5
2009	High Barnet, Edgware
2010	Southfields, Kingsbury, King's Cross St Pancras (Victoria, Northern and Piccadilly lines), Hainault, Stratford (Central line)
2011	Green Park
2012	Wembley Central, Farringdon, Blackfriars, Heathrow Terminals 1, 2, 3
2013	Paddington (Circle and Hammersmith & City lines)
2015	Greenford
2016	Tower Hill
2017	Tottenham Court Road, Bond Street
2018	Victoria, Bromley-by-Bow, Newbury Park, Buckhurst Hill, Bank (Waterloo and City line)
2019	Finsbury Park, South Woodford
2020	Cockfosters, Mill Hill East
2021	Whitechapel, Ickenham, Ealing Broadway, Debden, Amersham, Moorgate (Circle, Metropolitan and Hammersmith & City lines), Wimbledon Park, Battersea Power Station, Nine Elms, Osterley, Sudbury Hill
2022	Harrow-on-the-Hill, Paddington (Bakerloo line) (Note: Step-free access via an indirect route opened in May 2022 with the Elizabeth line, direct step-free access from ticket hall opened in September 2024.)
2023	Bank (Northern line)
2025	Knightsbridge, Colindale
2026	Northolt

==== Future accessible stations ====
- Leyton – under construction, planned opening in spring 2027
- Elephant & Castle (Northern line) – under construction, planned opening in the 2030s
- South Kensington (Circle and District lines) – due to start construction in 2026, planned opening in 2031

As part of the High Speed 2 project, Euston and Euston Square stations are to be made accessible.

In the 2020s, TfL announced that step-free feasibility work would take place at a number of stations across London. This included Colliers Wood and Tooting Broadway, following work to improve accessibility on the Northern line in south London. As of March 2026, 40 stations are in the design or feasibility stage for the addition of step-free access.

=== Rolling stock ===
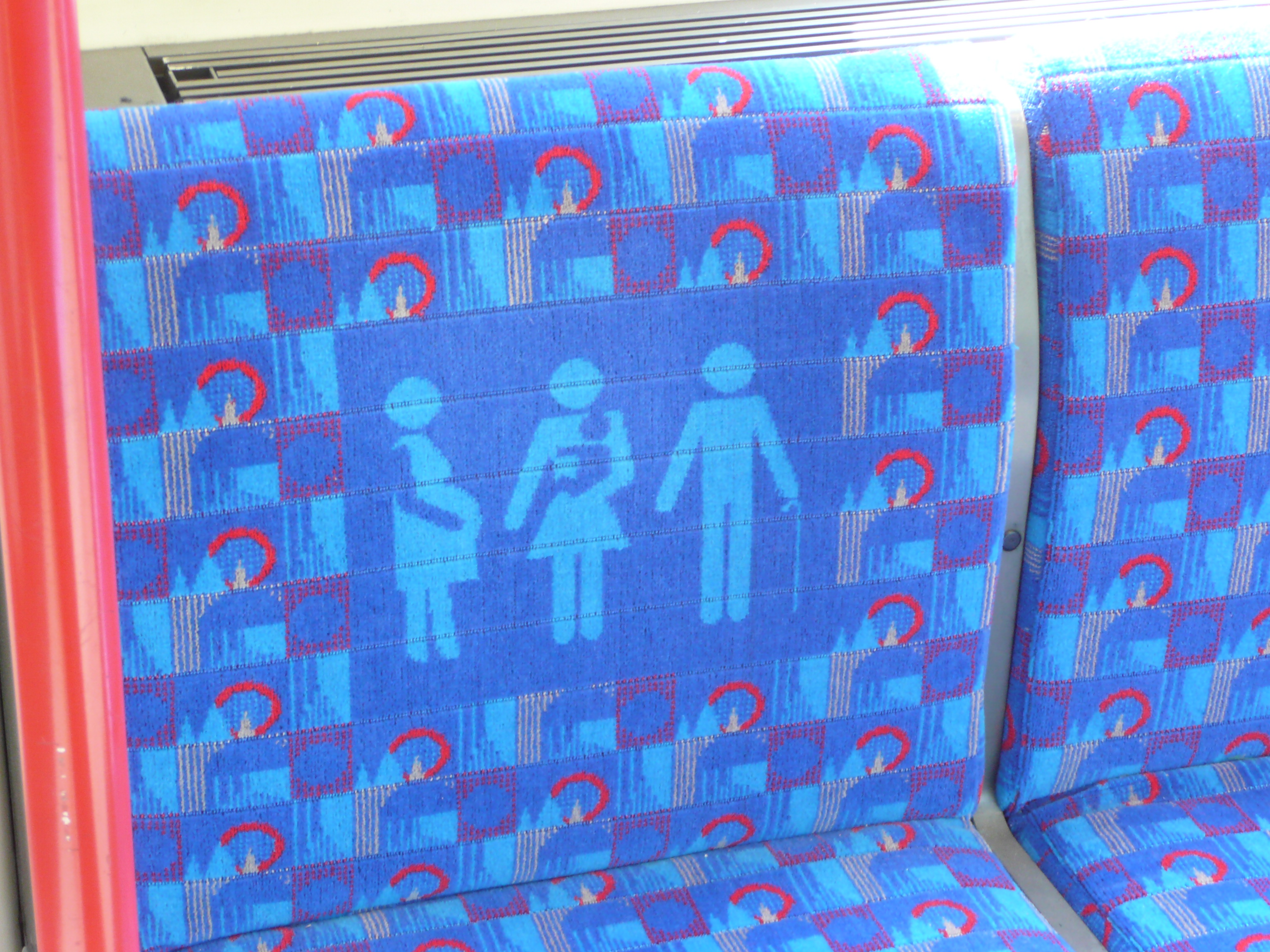
Moquette indicating a priority seat

Since 1999, all new Underground rolling stock has had to comply with accessibility regulations that require such things as access and room for wheelchairs, and the size and location of door controls. All Underground trains are required to comply with the Rail Vehicle Accessibility (Non Interoperable Rail System) Regulations 2010 (RVAR 2010) by 2020. All rolling stock has automated audio-visual station announcements.

Newer rolling stock like the 2009 Stock and S Stock have a wide range of accessibility features including:

- Dedicated wheelchair spaces
- Multi-purpose space with tip up seats
- Priority seats for those that need them
- Offset centre door poles
- Wide train doorways
- Audio visual announcements
- Contrast between surfaces, walls, seating and grab poles

== National Rail ==
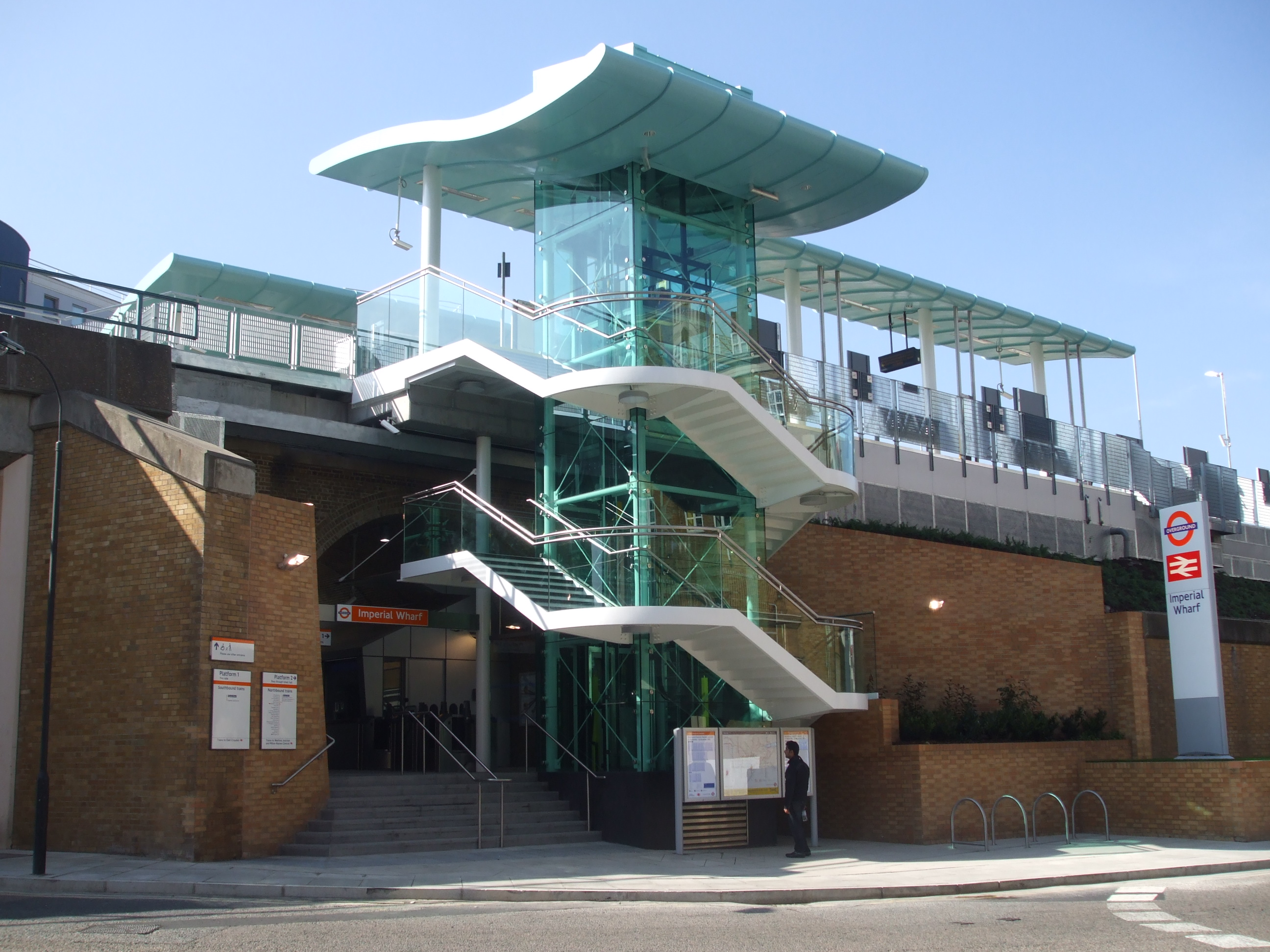
Staircase and lifts at Imperial Wharf station

=== London Overground ===
As of September 2026, 63 London Overground stations (54%) are accessible. Accessible Overground stations are usually only accessible from street to platform, with wheelchair ramps used to access the train owing to a variety of platform heights in the UK. Step-free access is provided by using lifts, level access and ramps as appropriate for each station. All stations feature minor accessibility features such as audiovisual passenger information, wide ticket gates, clear signage and help points with hearing loops.

TfL works closely with infrastructure manager Network Rail to add step-free access to London Overground stations, seeking funding from the Department for Transport "Access for All" programme as well as from London boroughs and property developers.

Year	Overground station gained step-free access
1999	Canada Water (as East London line), West Brompton (as Silverlink Metro)
2008	Shepherd's Bush
2009	Imperial Wharf, Stratford (London Overground)
2010	Dalston Junction, Haggerston, Hoxton, Shoreditch High Street
2011	Clapham Junction, Canonbury, Highbury & Islington (London Overground)
2012	Crystal Palace, Camden Road, Gospel Oak, Hackney Central, Wembley Central, West Croydon
2013	Denmark Hill
2014	Hampstead Heath
2015	Edmonton Green, Kensal Rise
2016	South Tottenham
2018	Hackney Wick, Blackhorse Road
2019	White Hart Lane, West Hampstead
2021	Whitechapel
2022	Barking Riverside
2026	Surrey Quays

=== Elizabeth line ===
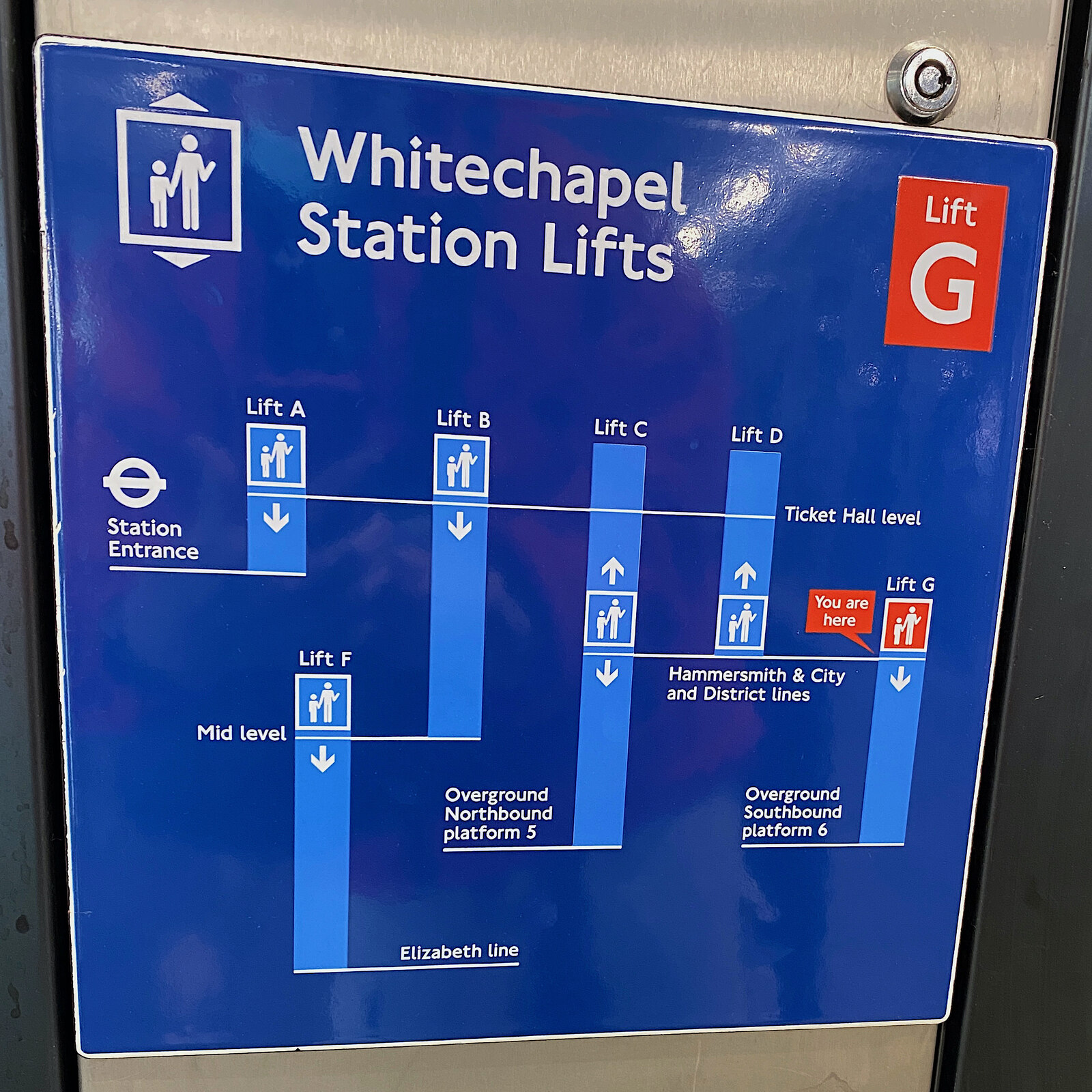
Diagram showing lifts at Whitechapel station

All 41 Elizabeth line stations are accessible from street to platform level, with 13 stations (in central London and at Heathrow Airport) having level access between trains and platforms. Boarding ramps are available at stations to allow access to the train where level access is not provided. Step-free access is provided by using lifts, inclined lifts, level access and ramps as appropriate for each station. All stations on the network feature minor accessibility features such as tactile platform strips, audiovisual passenger information, wide ticket gates, clear signage and help points with audio induction loops.

Year	Step-free access delivered as part of the Crossrail project
2017	Abbey Wood
2019	Forest Gate, Gidea Park, Goodmayes, Manor Park, Taplow, Seven Kings, Maryland, Burnham
2020	Hanwell, Harold Wood, Iver, Langley
2021	Acton Main Line, Ealing Broadway, West Ealing, Hayes & Harlington, Southall, West Drayton
2022	Bond Street, Canary Wharf, Custom House, Farringdon, Ilford, Liverpool Street, Paddington, Romford, Tottenham Court Road, Whitechapel, Woolwich

=== National Rail ===
The majority of railway stations in London are managed by train operating companies, with several major stations managed by Network Rail directly. Accessible National Rail stations are usually only accessible from street to platform, with wheelchair ramps used to access the train owing to a variety of platform heights in the UK. In 2006, Department for Transport launched the "Access for All" programme, which provides funding to make existing stations accessible, as well as providing minor accessibility improvements. TfL works with London boroughs to bid for "Access for All" funding for National Rail and Overground stations in London.

New National Rail stations (such as Brent Cross West, which opened in 2023) use accessible ramps or lifts to provide step-free access to platforms.

=== Rolling stock ===
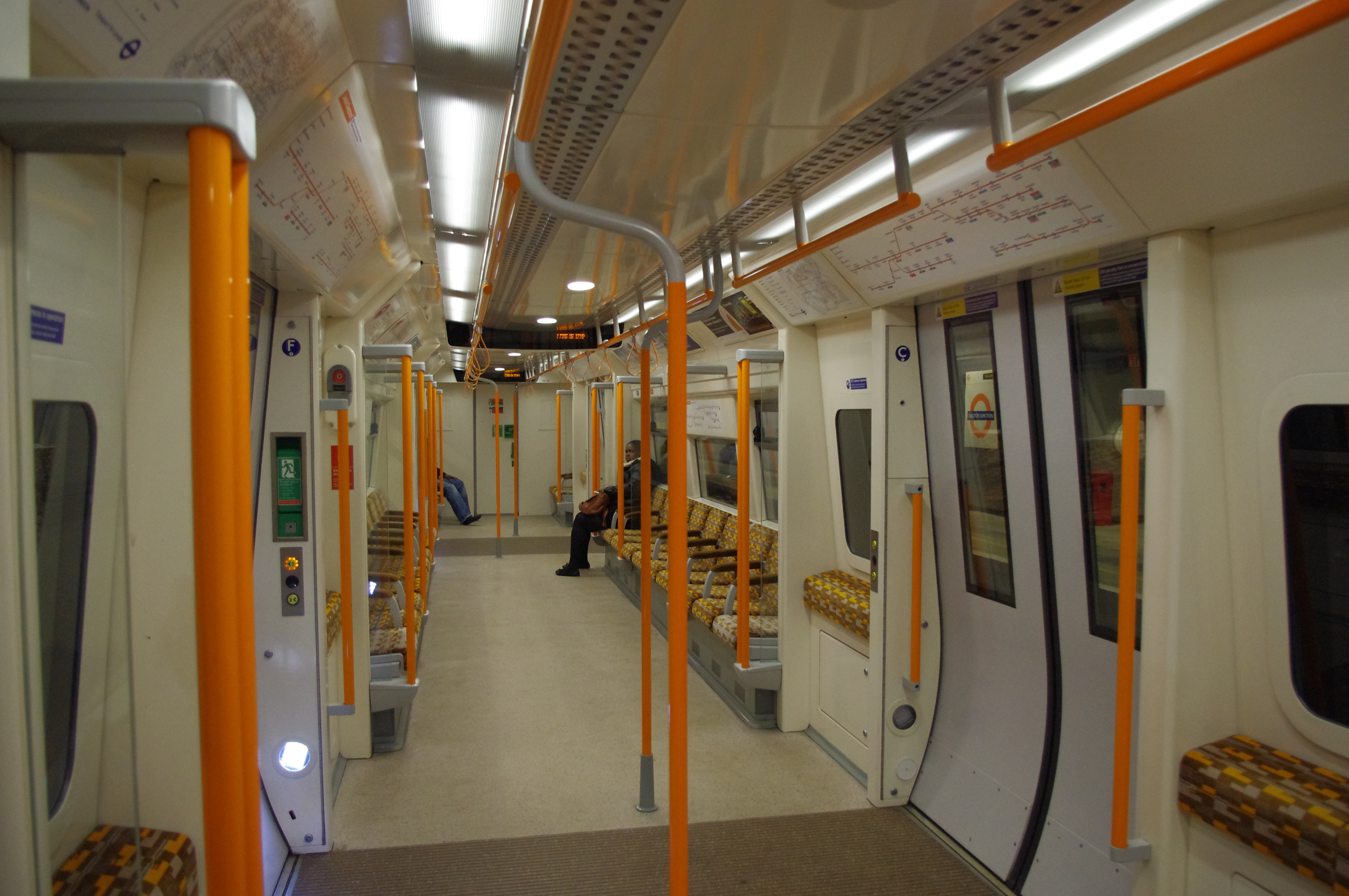
Interior of London Overground Class 378

Since 1999, all new National Rail trains have had to comply with accessibility regulations that require such things as access and room for wheelchairs, and the size and location of door controls. All trains are required to comply with the Rail Vehicle Accessibility (Non Interoperable Rail System) Regulations 2010 (RVAR 2010) by 2020. All rolling stock used in London has automated audio-visual station announcements.

Newer rolling stock like the Class 378 (as used on London Overground) and Class 345 (as used on the Elizabeth line) have a wide range of accessibility features including:

- Dedicated wheelchair spaces
- Multi-purpose space with tip up seats
- Priority seats for those that need them
- Wide train doorways
- Audio visual announcements
- Contrast between surfaces, walls, seating and grab poles

=== Future accessible stations ===
Work is ongoing to deliver step-free access at these London Overground and National Rail stations:

- Brondesbury
- Hackney Downs
- Peckham Rye
- Seven Sisters (London Overground only)
- Surrey Quays – planned opening in summer 2026

In May 2024, Bushey, Dalston Kingsland, Gunnersbury, Kew Bridge, Kidbrooke, Raynes Park, South Croydon and Upminster gained funding for Access for All feasibility work. In January 2026, work at Bushey, South Croydon and Upminster was put on hold, with other stations continuing to detailed design.

== Docklands Light Railway ==
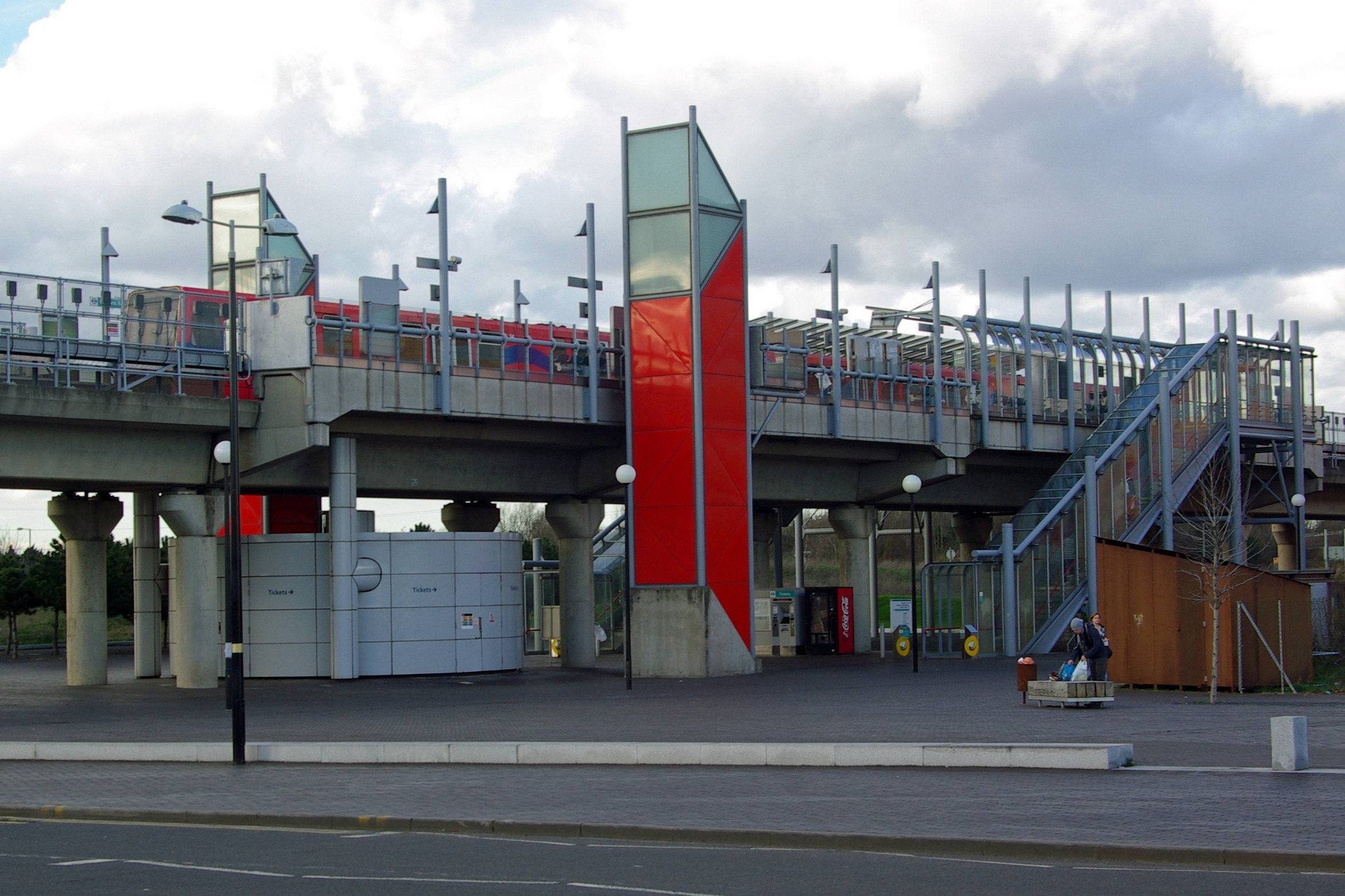
Gallions Reach DLR station, with lift shafts clad in red

The Docklands Light Railway (DLR) is an automated light metro that serves the London Docklands and surrounding areas of East London. From opening in 1987, the DLR has been fully accessible, with lifts and ramps providing step-free access at all 45 stations. The network has been extended multiple times, most recently in 2011. Other accessibility features include level access from street to train, tactile platform strips, priority seats on board trains for those who need them, dedicated wheelchair spaces on board trains and audiovisual announcements of stations. The system was praised during the 2012 Summer Paralympics for its high level of accessibility to venues in East London.

== London Trams ==
London Trams is a light rail system that serves Croydon and surrounding areas of South London, which opened as Croydon Tramlink in May 2000. The system has been accessible since opening, with low platforms, tactile paving and level access from platform to tram. Accessibility features on board the low-floor trams include wheelchair spaces, audiovisual announcements of stops and emergency intercom.

== Buses ==
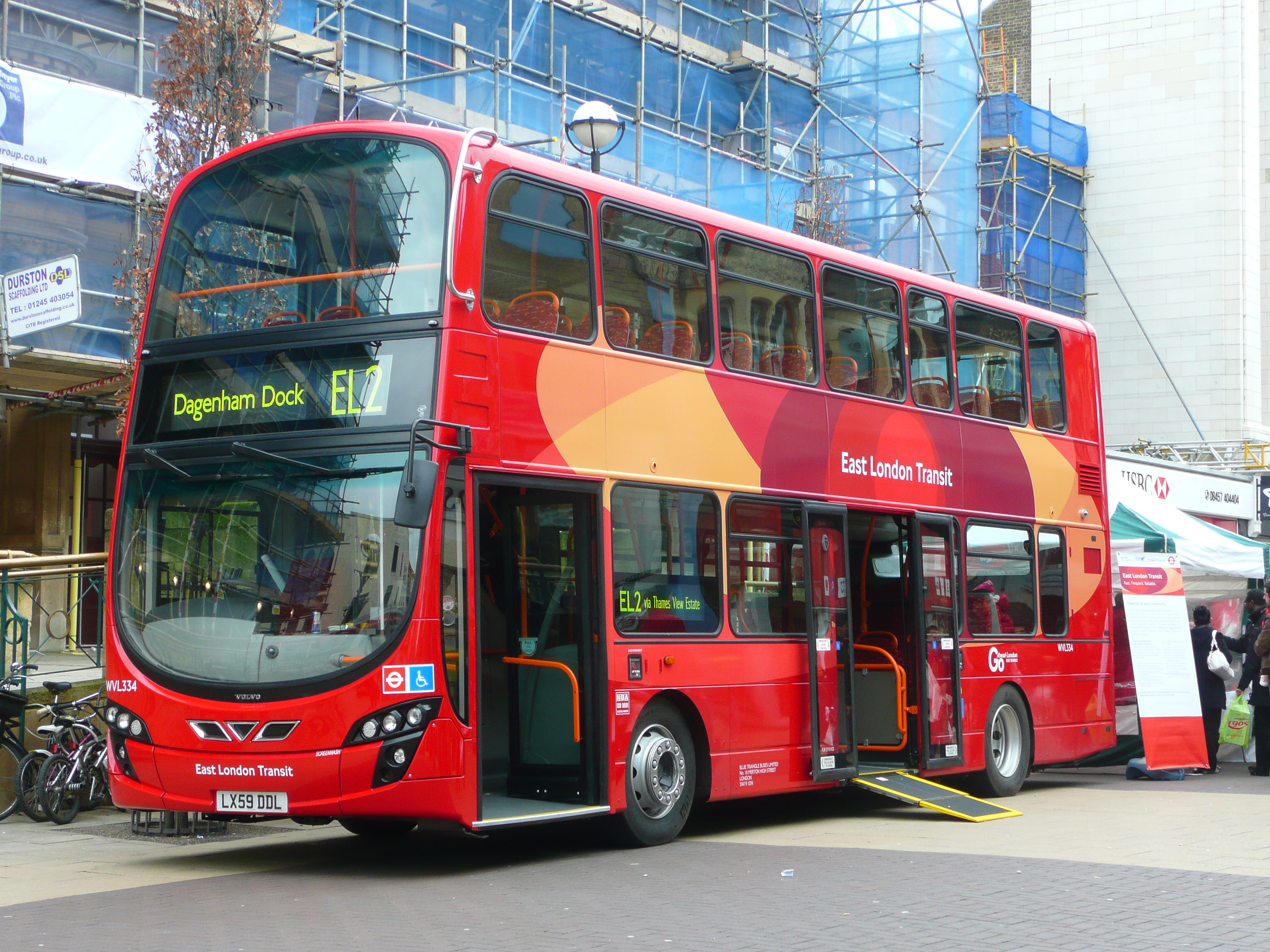
London double decker bus with deployed wheelchair ramp

London Buses was one of the earliest major users of low-floor buses in the UK, with the first low-floor single decker vehicles entering service in 1993 and the first low-floor double decker vehicles entering service in 1998. Following withdrawal of older, high-floor vehicles such as the AEC Routemaster, the bus fleet became fully accessible at the end of 2005, 10 years ahead of the national requirement. London was one of the first major cities in the world to have a fully accessible bus fleet.

As well as being low-floor, accessibility features of buses in London include:

- Electric powered, retractable wheelchair ramp
- The ability of the bus to "kneel", lowering itself towards the ground for easier access
- Dedicated wheelchair space on each bus
- iBus, an automated system that provides audio-visual announcements of bus stops
- Priority seats for people that need them

=== Mobility Buses ===
In the 1980s and 1990s, when many bus routes in London still used the high-floor Routemaster bus, London Transport ran several Mobility Bus routes for people who found the high floor buses difficult or impossible to use. Running to key destinations like shops, hospitals or railway stations, buses were fitted with a wheelchair lift for accessibility. A circular 'Stationlink' route ran in Central London, connecting London mainline railway stations with each other. Following the introduction of London-wide Dial-a-Ride services and replacement of high-floor buses with accessible low-floor buses in the early 2000s, routes were progressively withdrawn, despite criticism. As of August 2021, there is only one Mobility Bus route in service.

=== Accessible bus stops ===
Bus stops need to be accessible to allow passengers to access the bus safely. TfL defines an accessible bus stop as one with:

- 'No stopping' restrictions at bus stops – commonly referred to as the "bus stop cage" – to ensure that buses can use the stop and deploy the wheelchair ramp if required.
- A kerb height more than 100 mm to allow for safe deployment of the wheelchair ramp.
- Area around the bus stop free of obstructions, allowing wheelchair users and people with prams to access the ramp.

In recent years, TfL has worked with local boroughs to increase the number of accessible bus stops from less than 30% in 2008, to 80% in 2015 and 95% in 2019. Improvement work by London boroughs and TfL also improves access to bus stops, by providing dropped kerbs and tactile paving at crossings.

==== Bus stop bypasses ====
Since 2013, TfL has been building bus stop bypasses (sometimes called floating bus stops) along major roads to improve safety – a bus stop bypass is when a cycle lane is built behind the bus passenger boarding area, separating people cycling from vehicle traffic. These originated in the Netherlands in the 1950s, and are used across Europe, the United States and in other cities in the UK. TfL has been criticised by the National Federation of the Blind of the UK and other groups for building them, stating that they are dangerous for blind and partially sighted people. London Assembly Member Caroline Russell stated her support of the design, due to the "overwhelming" evidence that bus stop bypasses had reduced the number of people killed or seriously injured. TfL stated that they have carried out a review, and that bus stop bypasses are significantly safer than previous road designs – as they reduce dangerous interactions between cyclists, buses and other vehicles.

== Taxis and private hire vehicles ==
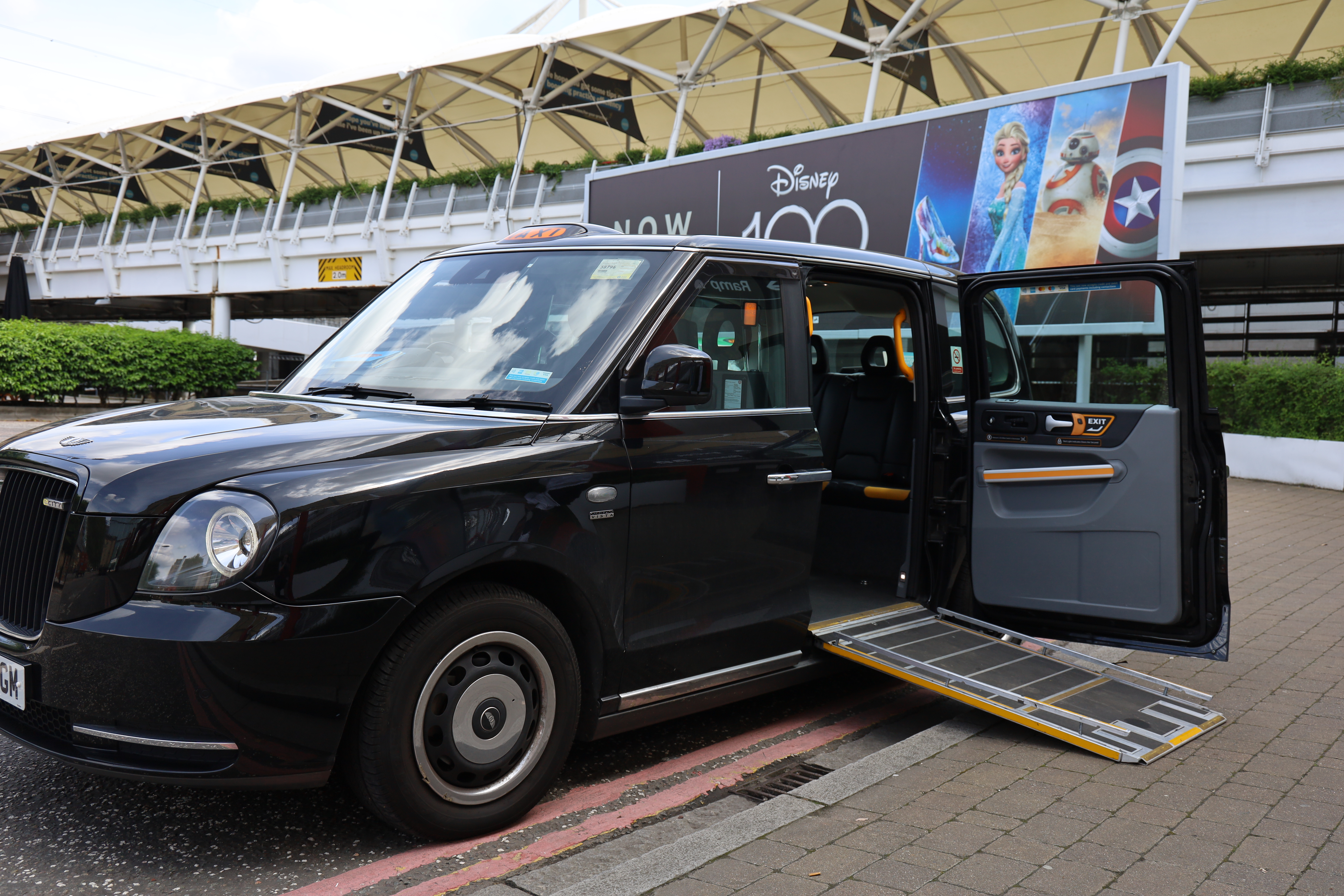
London taxi with wheelchair ramp

=== Taxis ===
The London taxi fleet has been fully accessible since 1 January 2000. Drivers are obliged to carry wheelchair passengers, passengers with guide dogs, and other mobility impaired passengers at no extra cost. Drivers must also assist passengers where requested – to enter or leave the vehicle, or to load luggage. From 2017, taxi or private hire vehicle drivers that refuse to pick up wheelchair passengers can be fined up to £1,000, as well as losing their operating licence.

The first accessible black cab available in London was the MCW Metrocab, introduced in 1987. From February 1989, all newly licensed vehicles were required as part of their Conditions of Fitness to be able to take a passenger in a wheelchair. Modern taxis such as TX1 or the electric LEVC TX have a range of accessibility features including a boarding ramp, oversized entry doors, an audio induction loop and high contrast grab handles.

=== Private hire vehicles ===
There is no obligation for private hire vehicles (PHVs) (such as Uber) in London to be accessible, with 0.7% of PHVs in London being wheelchair accessible. However, many providers have wheelchair accessible vehicles that can be hired. PHVs are also obliged to carry passengers with guide dogs.

In 2015, Gett announced a partnership with Assist-MI, an app which assists disabled users in interacting with services and communicating their needs to service providers. In 2015, Uber extended its uberASSIST scheme to London, designating certain drivers as being specifically trained to help users with disabilities. In 2016, Uber extended its uberWAV scheme to London, launching a fleet of vehicles designed to be accessible to be accessible to wheelchair users – WAV stands for "wheelchair accessible vehicle". In March 2017, the name of uberWAV changed to uberACCESS. In 2017, Uber faced a licensing ban by TfL, which was criticised as negatively affecting blind users, who would be able to use the Uber app to request a driver, but struggle to hail a traditional taxi.

=== Pedicabs ===
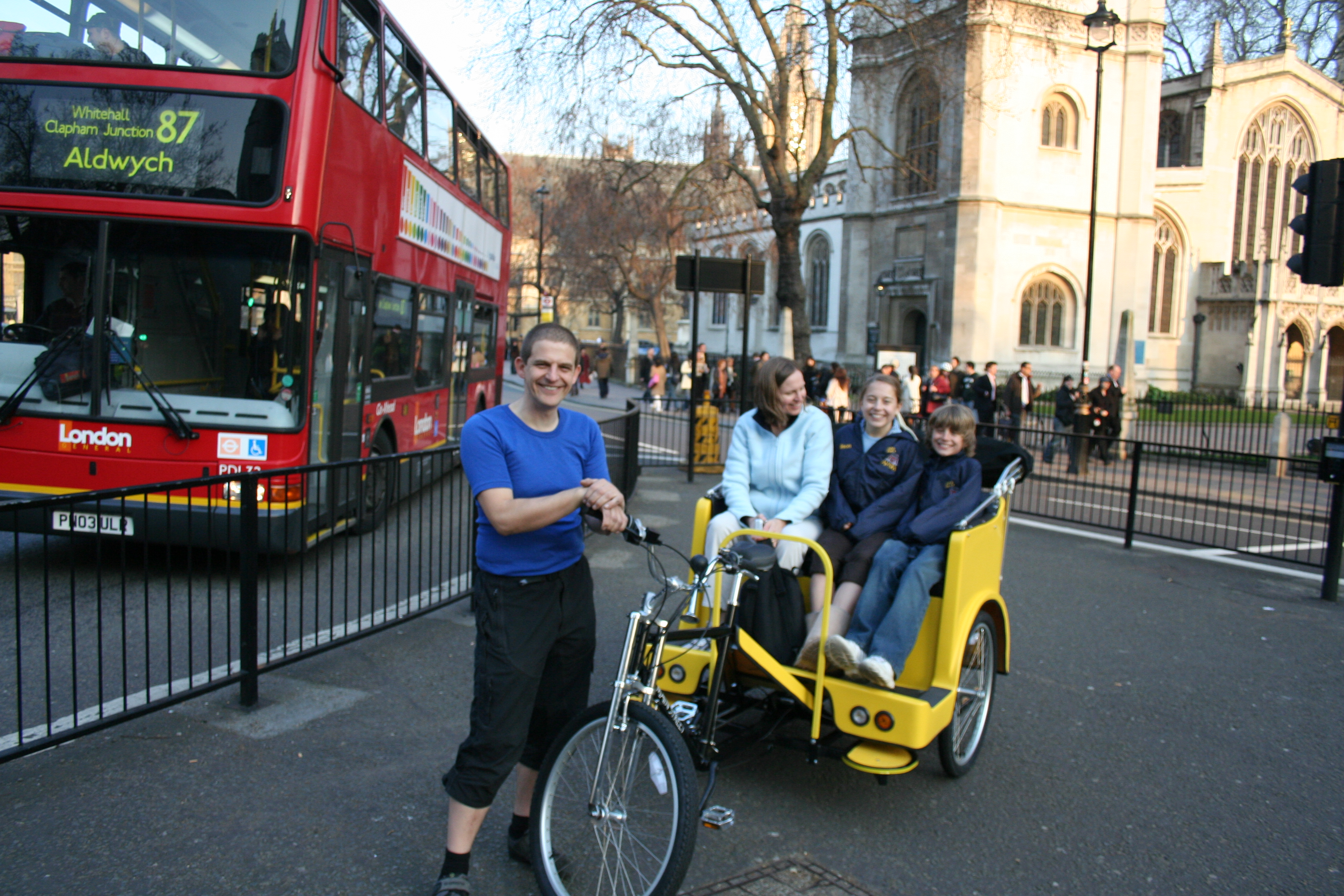
Three people using a pedicab in London

Pedicabs in London have been criticised as being discriminatory towards disabled people, and for being largely unregulated. TfL launched a consultation for regulations under the Pedicabs (London) Act 2024. The regulations would put pedicabs on a similar basis to taxis and private hire vehicles but would be specific to the market in which pedicabs operate, according to TfL.

== Air travel ==
London is served by six major airports, with high quality public transport connecting them to the city itself. The Civil Aviation Authority (CAA) publish an annual accessibility report, ranking every major airport in the UK.

In 2022, London City Airport was praised for its accessibility provision. In 2023, Stansted Airport was rated as "very good" for its services for disabled passengers. In 2018, Southend Airport was classified as "very good" for accessibility, and was described as the most accessible airport in London and the southeast. In 2022, London Luton Airport was singled out by the CAA as providing poor service for passengers with reduced mobility and unlike other airports in the United Kingdom, it did not improve its performance across the year.

In 2022, Terminal 5 at Heathrow Airport was criticised for not providing enough for support for disabled passengers, to the point where certain disabled passengers missed a connecting flight. In 2023, a report by the CAA described improvements at Heathrow, but also considered that the airport still needed accessibility improvements. The CAA acknowledged that "targets were routinely met in Terminal 2 and Terminal 4 even as there was lower performance at Terminal 3 and Terminal 5".

== London cable car ==
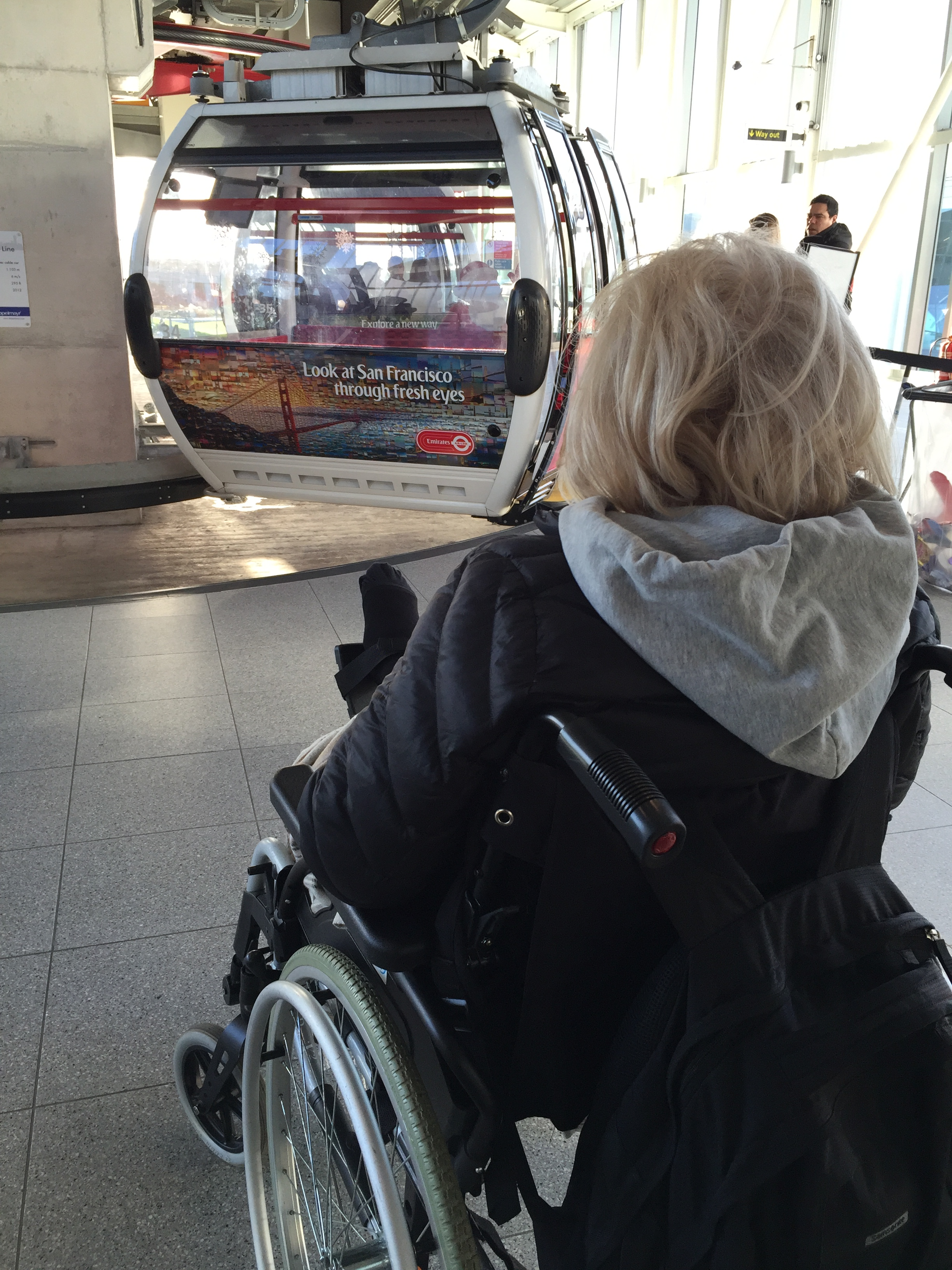
Woman using a wheelchair boarding passenger gondola at Royal Victoria

The London cable car has step-free access, with space in each gondola cabin for pushchairs, wheelchairs and mobility scooters. Staff can slow or stop the boarding process to allow easier access for passengers.

== River boats ==
All piers operated by London River Services have step-free access. River boats operated by Thames Clippers have wheelchair spaces, audio-visual announcements and accessible toilets.

== Dial-a-Ride and Taxicard ==
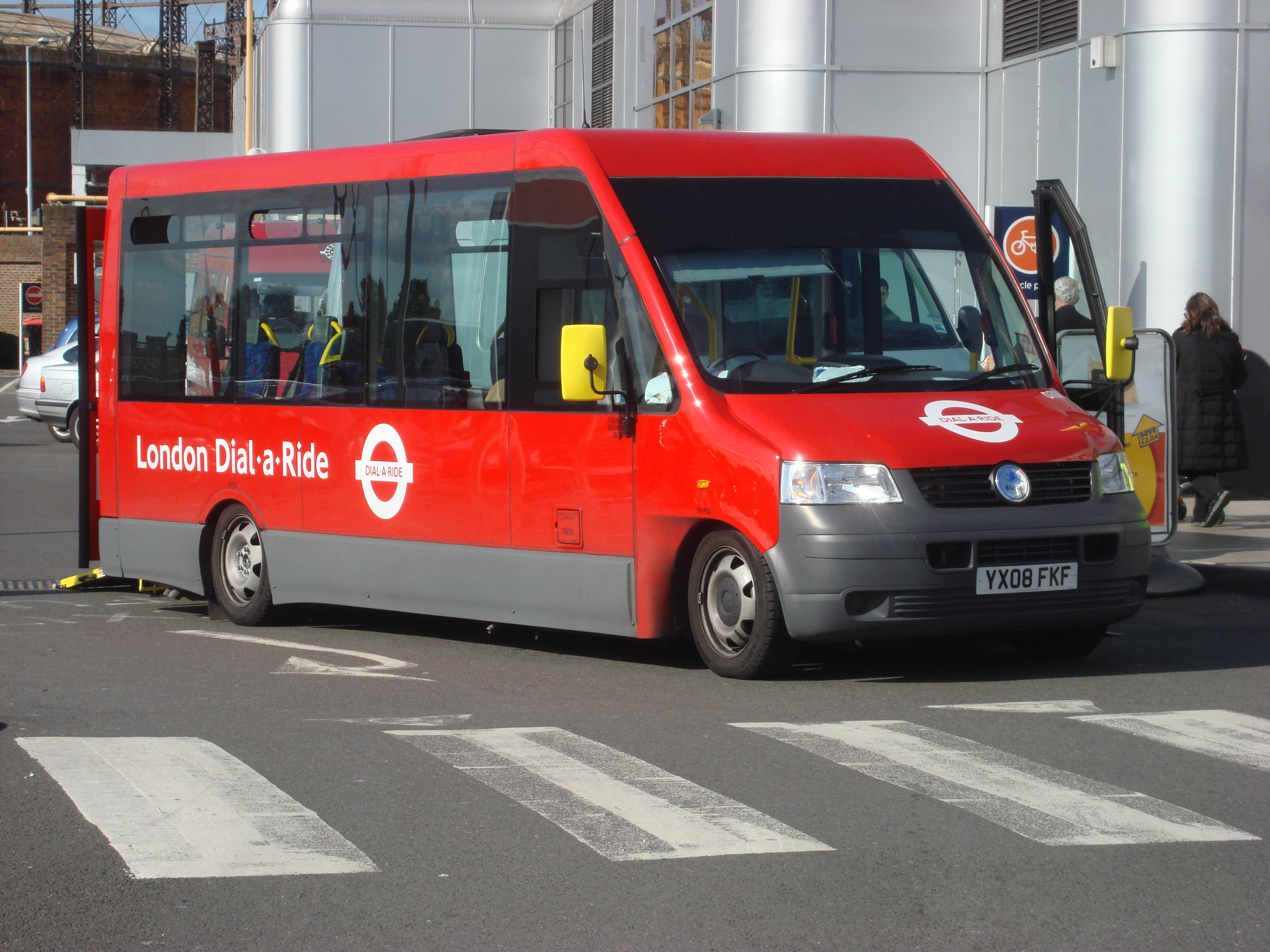
London Dial-a-Ride minibus

London Dial-a-Ride provides door to door, accessible community transport for people who are unable to use public transport services such as the bus, train or Tube. Membership is available to people with long term or permanent disabilities or health problems. Originally run by London boroughs and funded by London Transport, the scheme has been run and funded by TfL since 2002. In 2019, there were around 40,000 members of the scheme.

The 'Taxicard' scheme provides subsidised taxi and private hire journeys for Londoners with serious mobility or visual issues, with around 60,000 members registered to the scheme. Originally funded by the Greater London Council, the scheme is now run by London Councils.

== Active travel ==
Pavements in several boroughs have been criticised for being inaccessible due to cracks and other degradations. The provision of low traffic neighbourhoods has allowed for the improvement of accessible cycling infrastructure.

=== Public hire schemes ===
Dockless bicycle hire schemes have been criticised for blocking streets and therefore making pavements in certain areas of London inaccessible. Electric bicycles in London are largely unregulated. In 2023, TfL called for electric bicycles to be put on a similar regulatory basis as electric scooters. TfL has been granted the powers to create a regulatory framework for dockless electric bicycles and scooters.

==== Santander Cycles ====
Santander Cycles is a public bicycle hire scheme in London. In 2022, electric bicycles were added to Santander Cycles. This was praised by Wheels for Wellbeing, a disability charity, because it would make the scheme more accessible.

=== Footpaths ===
The Greenwich foot tunnel and Woolwich foot tunnel are managed by Royal Borough of Greenwich. They have both been criticised for the lifts at each end of both tunnels not working, and for the resulting inaccessibility for elderly and disabled individuals. Certain local campaigners have called for TfL to take over the tunnels. In 2025, an independent software engineer published an app to provide information on the status of the lifts at each end of both tunnels.

== Driving ==
=== Disabled parking ===
The blue badge scheme provides cheaper and simpler access for disabled people when parking. Four London boroughs – Westminster, City of London, Kensington and Chelsea, and part of Camden – have exemptions from the blue badge scheme. In 2024, Bromley proposed to charge holders of blue badges, but the policy was dropped. The annual number of blue badge thefts in London increased from 1,230 in 2014 to 6,415 in 2023.

==== Shopmobility ====
Some local authorities offer Shopmobility, where people with mobility issues or older people can borrow wheelchairs or mobility scooters to access shops in town centres or shopping centres. Shopmobility often works in conjunction with blue badge parking located close to shops as well as working with Dial-a-Ride.

=== Toll roads ===
The firm who manages the Dartford Crossing, Conduent, has been criticised for not responding promptly, and the responses that they do give being inaccessible to disabled people. Holders of blue badges are only exempt from being charged if they do not pay vehicle tax. Both the Blackwall Tunnel and Silvertown Tunnel have exemptions for holders of a blue badge from being charged. Black taxis and wheelchair accessible PHVs are also exempt from the toll.

=== Congestion charge and Ultra Low Emission Zone ===
The London congestion charge has a discount for holders of a blue badge. Holders of blue badges are not exempt from the Ultra Low Emission Zone charges, unless the vehicle is specifically classified as "disabled" or as a "disabled passenger vehicle". The introduction of the Ultra Low Emission Zone across Greater London in 2023 resulted in air quality improvements across the city, with falls in the level of nitrogen dioxide and particulate matter.

=== Electric vehicles ===
Electric vehicle charging cables that cross the pavement can pose issues for pedestrians, and cause specific harms for pedestrians with reduced mobility. As of 2024, there are no electric vehicle charging points in London which meet the government's accessibility standards.

== School transport ==
School transport children with special educational needs is provided by individual councils in their capacity as local education authorities. Every child has a personal travel budget beyond which parents are required to pay for their child's travel to school. This may take the form of buses, minibuses or taxis depending on individual circumstances.

Individual boroughs have been criticised for restricting staff giving medicines to children who are passengers, for not clearly communicating the procedure for personal travel budgets, among other issues.

== Non-emergency transport to hospitals ==
Non-emergency transport to hospitals is provided by NHS Trusts. Certain trusts have been criticised for not offering it proactively to all disabled individuals.

== Other assistance ==
Across the TfL network, station and train staff are specifically trained to offer assistance or guidance to passengers. Guidance and maps is offered in a range of formats including high contrast, large print or audio description. For people unfamiliar or unsure about taking public transport, TfL offers a free travel mentoring service to help people get comfortable and gain confidence with taking public transport.

People can apply for baby on board badges, which help other passengers identify pregnant travellers who would like to be offered a seat. In 2017, TfL reported that around 130,000 badges were being issued every year. TfL also has "please offer me a seat" badges for passengers who may have hidden disabilities or impairments, as well as recognising the Hidden Disabilities Sunflower. TfL also provides information about public toilets located at their stations, with work underway to increase the number of toilets on the public transport network.

Free public transport is available to Londoners who are over the state pension age, as well as some disabled Londoners. This is available through the Freedom Pass concessionary travel scheme. Originally created in the 1970s by the Greater London Council, the scheme is now funded by local authorities and coordinated by London Councils.

TfL provide a version of the map of the London Underground specifically designed for colourblind users.

== See also ==
- Accessibility of the Metropolitan Transportation Authority, New York City
- MBTA accessibility, Boston
- Toronto Transit Commission accessibility
