= Jon Benjamin (Jewish leader) =

British lawyer and Jewish leader

Marc Jonathan Benjamin (born 31 October 1964) is a qualified lawyer and has held various leadership positions in NGOs and Jewish communal organisations, including as Chief Executive of the Board of Deputies of British Jews from January 2005 to May 2013 and Chief Operating Officer of World ORT from January 2014 to December 2015.

== Biography ==
Born in Croydon, South London, he attended Park Hill Junior School, Dulwich College where he was a contemporary of Nigel Farage, and Manchester University where he read law. He practiced law as a litigator in the city at Denton Hall Burgin and Warrens (now Dentons) and then Teacher Stern.

He moved into communal service in 1996, working for several years for educational and cultural charities before joining the Board of Deputies in January 2005.

He has an entry in Who's Who and the Jewish Chronicle listed him in its 'Power 100' most influential members of the UK Jewish community, noting his modernising role at the Board of Deputies and his contacts within government.

Early in his tenure at the Board of Deputies he had to respond to the controversy following the publication of photographs of Prince Harry wearing a fancy dress Nazi uniform. This episode was followed by the incident in which the then Mayor of London, Ken Livingstone, called a Jewish journalist a "German war criminal" and a "concentration camp guard", which prompted the Board of Deputies to refer the matter to the Standards Board for England, along with some two dozen other complainants.

Jon Benjamin has subsequently played a leading role in issues affecting the UK Jewish community, including on the issues of faith schools, Holocaust era looted art, interfaith activity and domestic and international affairs. He has given evidence to UK Parliamentary Select and Legislative Committees, the Supreme Court and in the immigration tribunal on the issue of Jewish status.

He sat on the Charity Commission's Faiths Advisory Council and has acted as a 'critical friend' to the commission, providing advice on the Public Benefit Guidelines published in 2008. He chaired the Chief Executives' Forum for Jewish Charities and was a member of the Policy Research Advisory Group of the Institute for Jewish Policy Research and a board member of the World Council of Jewish Communal Service. He was also a member of the consultancy advisory panel of the National Council for Voluntary Organisations and served on charity sector working groups on volunteering and trustee best practice.

Jon Benjamin has broadcast on television and radio, and has been quoted extensively in print media in the UK and abroad.

Since leaving the Board of Deputies he has offered consultancy services to not-for-profit organisations through his consultancy, MJB Consulting, and served as Chief Operating Officer at World ORT between January 2014 and December 2015.

In June 2015 he became chairman of the Israel Guide Dog Centre - UK Friends, a registered charity in England supporting the only accredited breeding and training facilities for guide dogs in Israel. In September 2017 he was appointed a trustee of the Sir Martin Gilbert Learning Centre, a charity established to preserve the legacy of the renowned historian through history based education.
