= Stationlink (London Buses) =

Stationlink was a brand of accessible limited-stop London Buses routes in Central London, connecting the main terminal stations with each other.

== History ==
The service was launched in 1993 and replaced Carelink, which had begun as an accessible bus route for disabled people operated by National Bus Company. In contrast to the Carelink service, Stationlink was open to all passengers and was included in the Travelcard scheme. Holders of Disabled Persons Railcard and Senior Railcard could use the service for free. The accessible mini-buses had driver operated wheelchair lifts, and had space for luggage, wheelchairs and pushchairs.

The initial service operated in a clockwise direction only, calling at Paddington, Marylebone, Euston, St Pancras, King's Cross, Liverpool Street, Fenchurch Street, London Bridge, Waterloo, Victoria and Victoria Coach Station.

From 29 June 1996 the clockwise route, now numbered SL1, was supplemented by the SL2 anti-clockwise service. The additional route doubled Stationlink service. Both routes were now operated with accessible, low-floor Optare Excel buses, described in the Evening Standard as 'roll-on, roll-off'.

Stationlink was replaced in 2002 by routes 205 and 705. Accessibility across central London more generally was achieved by 2005 with the completion of a fully accessible, low-floor bus fleet.
