= Critical friend =

A critical friend is a supportive person who can ask difficult questions using critical thinking to judge a situation. The term has its origins in critical pedagogy education reforms in the 1970s and arose out of the self-appraisal activity which is attributed to Desmond Nuttall. One of the most widely used definitions is from 1993,

A critical friend can be defined as a trusted person who asks provocative questions, provides data to be examined through another lens, and offers critiques of a person's work as a friend. A critical friend takes the time to fully understand the context of the work presented and the outcomes that the person or group is working toward. The friend is an advocate for the success of that work.

Andrew Hutchinson, a public sector consultant, introduced the term to the Local Government Consortium at the University of Warwick in 1998 and it is cited in several papers produced by Professor Jean Hartley of the Local Government Consortium. The critical friend is characterised as falling between the extremes of the "hostile witness" and the "uncritical lover" whereas earlier texts go so far as to allude to Janus in discussing the concept.

This dichotomy appealed to Hutchinson who frequently used the term while leader of the South East Midlands Citizen's Charter Quality Network run by the Cabinet Office in Whitehall. In his time running the network he came into regular contact with fellow Lancastrian and Government Minister Peter Kilfoyle MP, Public Service Minister who was responsible for the running of the networks as minister. When Kilfoyle found himself increasingly distanced from the policy agenda of Prime Minister Tony Blair and he chose to resign from Government, Hansard quotes him as saying that he wished to return to the back benches but remain a "critical friend" of the Government.

He was misquoted in The Daily Telegraph as they claimed that he had said that he wished to be a "candid friend" to Government. It is not unreasonable to suppose that the term critical friend has its origins in the softer sounding notion of the candid friend. Nonetheless following the resignation of Peter Kilfoyle The Guardian newspaper began to popularise the term which is increasingly entering into general usage. The phrase is still most commonly used in education circles but its wider use in the public sector can to a large part be attributed to Andrew Hutchinson and his natural enthusiasm for the concept, being described as 'a natural critical friend acting with positive intent' in 1999 by the then Chief Executive of Coventry City Council, Iain Roxburgh, who is now Director of the Warwick Research Consortium. While a variety of useful and interesting quotations are to be found on the web perhaps the reason for the popularity of the phrase is best summed up by the following quotation,

The Critical Friend is a powerful idea, perhaps because it contains an inherent tension. Friends bring a high degree of unconditional positive regard. Critics are, at first sight at least, conditional, negative and intolerant of failure. Perhaps the critical friend comes closest to what might be regarded as 'true friendship' – a successful marrying of unconditional support and unconditional critique.

Critical friends play an important role in decision making, for example in governance of schools where they hold the head teacher and other leaders to account, while supporting their wider aims without being sycophantic.
