= New Covent Garden Market =

Wholesale market in London

Coordinates: 51.47807°N 0.13527°W

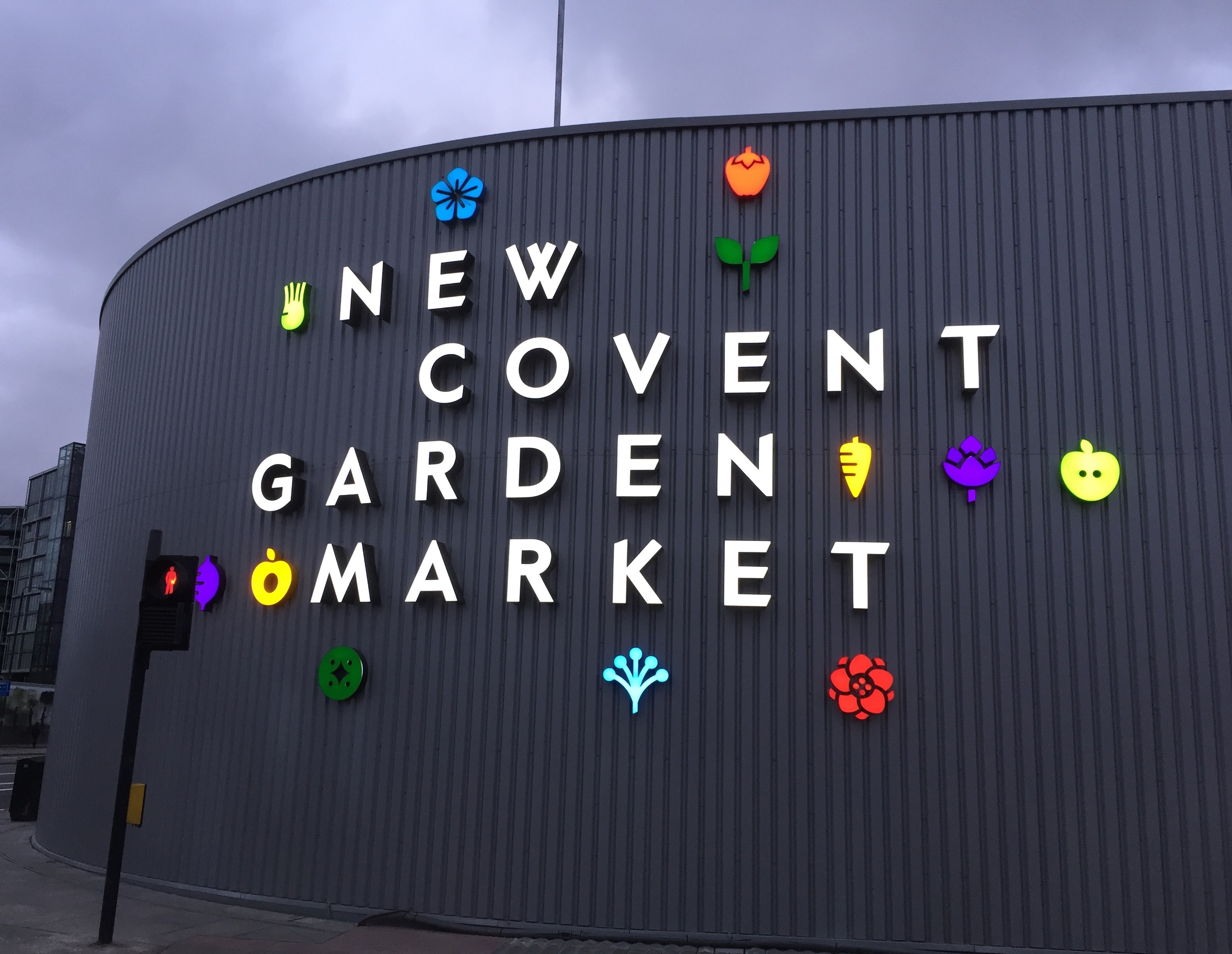
New Covent Garden Market

New Covent Garden Market in Nine Elms, London, is the largest wholesale fruit, vegetable and flower market in the United Kingdom. It covers a site of 57 acres (23 ha) and is home to about 200 fruit, vegetable and flower companies. The market serves 40% of the fruit and vegetables eaten outside of the home in London, and provides ingredients to many of London's restaurants, hotels, schools, prisons, hospitals and catering businesses.

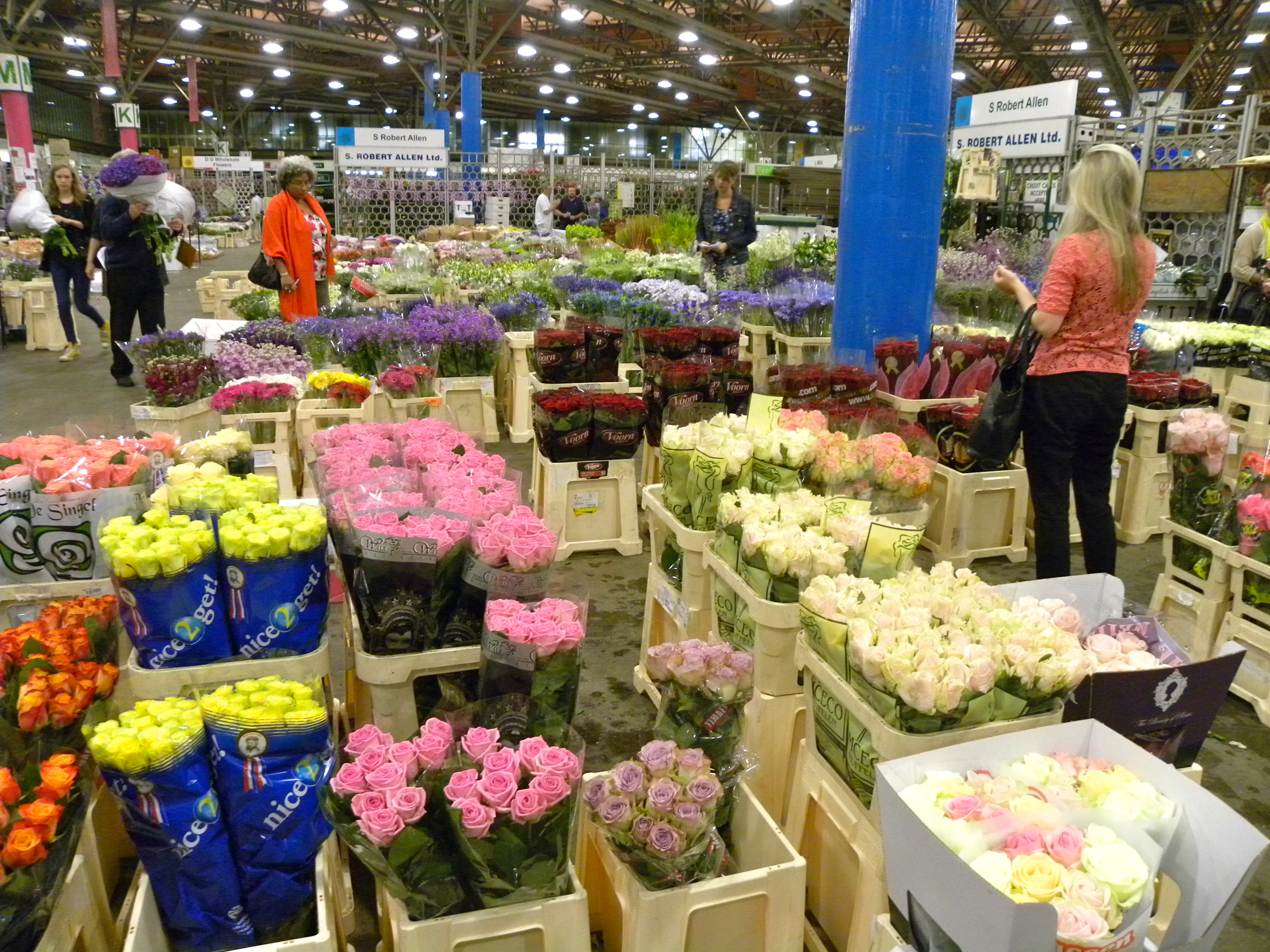
New Covent Garden Market – flower market

The Flower Market, which offers flowers, plants, foliages, sundries and interior decorations from the UK and from around the globe, is visited by 75% of florists in London, many of whom place morning orders and return to restock during the day. The Flower Market wholesalers are open from 04:00 to 10:00 Monday to Saturday and the Fruit & Vegetable Market wholesalers trade from around 00:00 – 06:00 Monday to Saturday.

There is a £5 entry fee for visitors driving to the market. The nearest London Underground stations are Battersea Power Station and Nine Elms, both opened in 2021 as part of the Northern line extension to Battersea.

== History ==
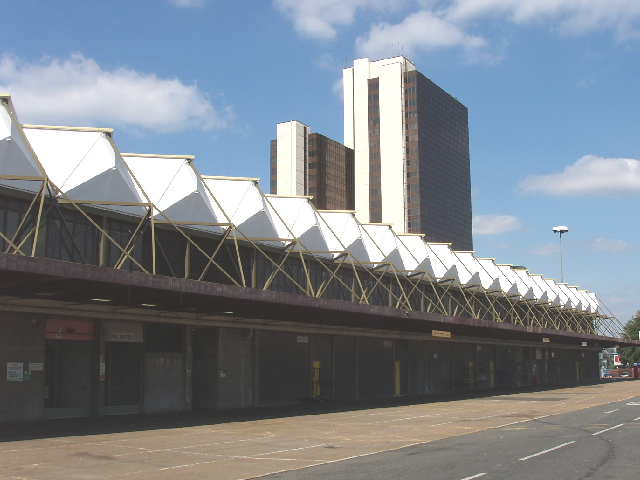
New Covent Garden - external view circa 2005 with the now demolished Market Towers in the background

For many years the capital's main wholesale market for fruit and vegetables was at Covent Garden in central London, just as the meat market was at Smithfield, fish at Billingsgate and other food at Leadenhall Market. As the supply of fresh food was considered strategically important, the Covent Garden Market Act 1961 (9 & 10 Eliz. 2 c. 49) established the Covent Garden Market Authority (CGMA), charged with modernising and overseeing the administration of the produce market. Construction began in 1971 south of the Thames in Battersea, on the site of the former Nine Elms Locomotive Depot (and previously the Nine Elms Locomotive Works and Nine Elms railway station), which closed in 1967. The new market opened for business on 11 November 1974, although its ceremonial opening, by the Queen and the Duke of Edinburgh, was on 26 June 1975. The Covent Garden Market (Financial Provisions) Act 1977 (c. 2), an act of the Parliament of the United Kingdom was passed to reduce the debt of the Covent Garden Market Authority to the government.

The CGMA is a statutory corporation, which reports to the Department for Environment, Food and Rural Affairs (DEFRA). As a statutory corporation, the UK treasury has shielded New Covent Garden from changes in conditions of the wholesale industry. In the 1980s, when the wholesale industry was threatened by the growth of supermarkets, New Covent Garden Market were able to switch focus to the hospitality industry. Since 1990, successive governments have attempted to privatise or dispose of the market as a going concern.

== Redevelopment ==
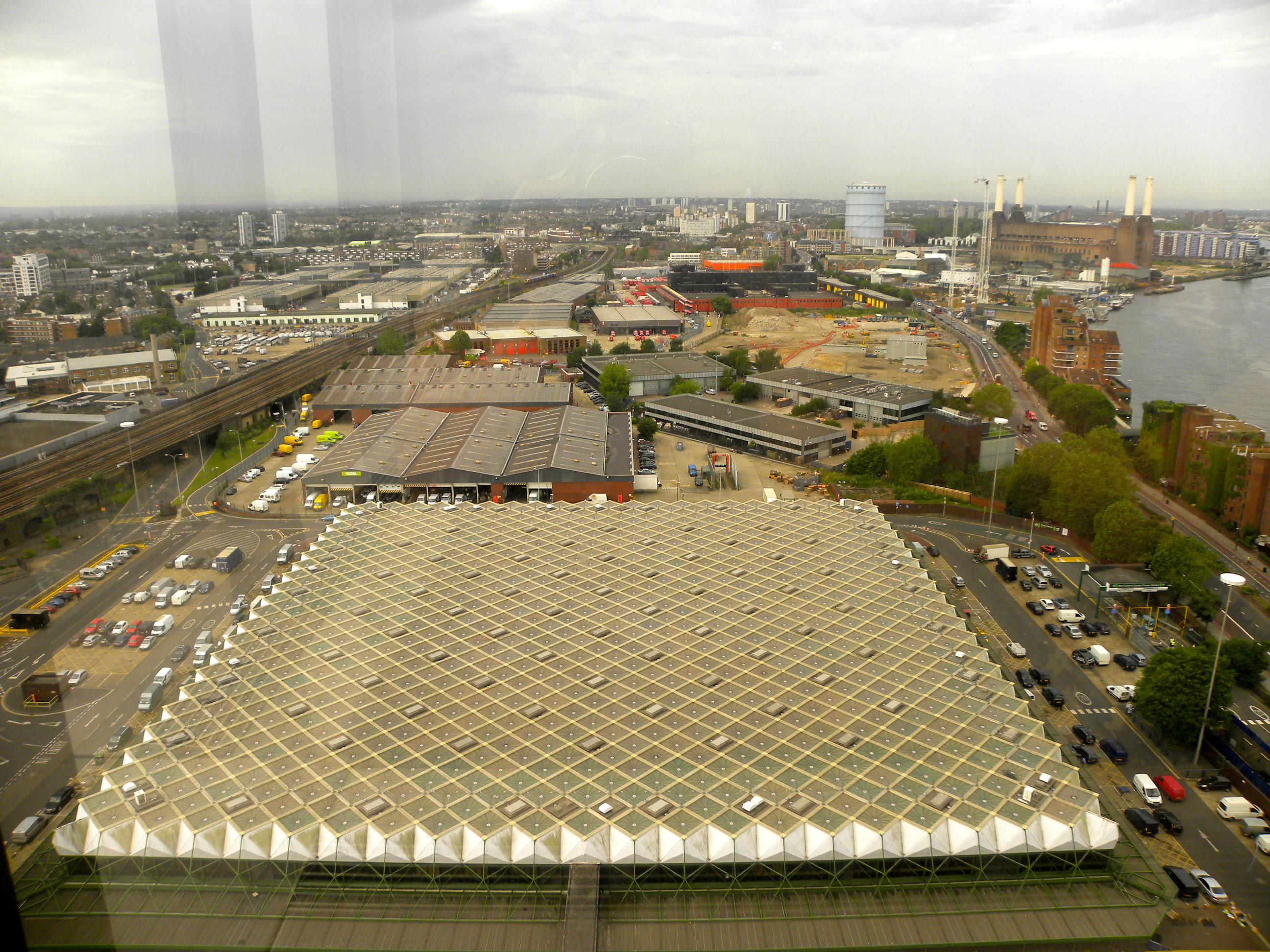
Aerial view of the market

By 2005, the buildings were beginning to show signs of their age, in need of modernising. Following a report by PricewaterhouseCoopers, the CGMA and DEFRA agreed on a plan (known as Project Chrysalis) to reform and redevelop the market to enable it to be eventually sold. The CGMA, which had previously paid any profits as dividends to HM Treasury, was allowed to retain its profits to fund the initial planning work.

The CGMA signed a contract with Vinci and St. Modwen in 2013 for the market's regeneration for a five-year development project Funded by releasing spare land to the developers to build residential properties, a development now known as Thames City. The £2 billion project is expected to provide 2000 additional jobs, include 3000 new homes, 135,000 square feet of commercial units and 100,000 square feet of retail facilities. The project is a part of the wider Nine Elms Regeneration area, which also encompasses the relocation of the Embassy of the United States, London to Nine Elms, the regeneration of Battersea Power Station, and an extension of the Underground's Northern line (funded in part by the CGMA).

== Construction timeline ==
By the time redevelopment works started in 2015 (months behind schedule), the project's timeline had increased in scope and was expected to take 10 years. The Flower Market, situated near the Battersea Park Road entrance, opened in April 2017, with the Food Exchange opening in January 2018. Phase One of the regeneration completed in December 2019.

However, traders were unimpressed about the quality of the new units, relating to logistics, spacing and electric capacity. In 2018, their Tenant association sued the CGMA over breach of contract. The lawsuit was settled in December 2020 with the CGMA agreeing to implement changes proposed in a consultation made earlier that year.

The second phase of works started in January 2021, to be completed in 2026.

By 23 May 2023, there was a more significant and very visible progression on the latest phase of development. The newest block would comprise 24 units, measure about 6.5 metres in width and be a new home for four wholesalers. There was another milestone on the opening of the new Southern Access Road on 27 March and the second route became an exit. This would allow complete entry for construction vehicles only.
