= Nine Elms station =

Nine Elms station may refer to:

- Nine Elms railway station, a closed station on the London and South Western Railway
- Nine Elms tube station, a London Underground station on the Battersea branch of the Northern line
