= Northern line extension to Battersea =

London Underground construction project

- Route of extension

Overview
- Status: Opened
- Locale: London Borough of Wandsworth; London Borough of Lambeth; London Borough of Southwark
- Termini: Kennington; Battersea Power Station
- Stations: 2

Service
- Type: Rapid transit
- System: London Underground
- Operator: Transport for London

History
- Opened: 20 September 2021

Technical
- Line length: 2 mi (3.22 km)
- Track gauge: 1,435 mm (4 ft 8 1/2 in)
- Operating speed: 45 mph (72 km/h)

The Northern line extension to Battersea is an extension of the London Underground from Kennington to Battersea in South West London, terminating at the redeveloped Battersea Power Station. The extension formed a continuation of the Northern line's Charing Cross branch and was built beginning in 2015; it opened in 2021.

Two new underground stations were built: Nine Elms and terminus Battersea Power Station. Both stations are in London fare zone 1. Provision was made for a future extension to Clapham Junction. Since the closure of the Battersea Power Station in the 1980s, multiple attempts were made to redevelop the area. In the mid 2000s, Irish property developers proposed extending the Northern line to serve the power station site, to improve connectivity and spur development. After the 2008 financial crisis and the collapse of the Irish property bubble in the late 2000s, the Battersea Power Station site was bought by Malaysian investors, who subsequently contributed around £260m towards the construction of the Underground extension.

Construction took six years and cost £1.1 billion (under budget by £160 million) and the extension opened on 20 September 2021. It was the first major extension of the Underground since the Jubilee Line Extension in 1999. It was funded by the private sector, including the developers of Battersea Power Station, with contributions from other developments across the Vauxhall, Nine Elms and Battersea area. The construction of the extension was supported by local councils, property developers and local residents. However, the subsequent development in the Vauxhall, Nine Elms and Battersea areas has been criticised for gentrification and low levels of affordable housing.

== Background ==
=== Battersea Power Station ===
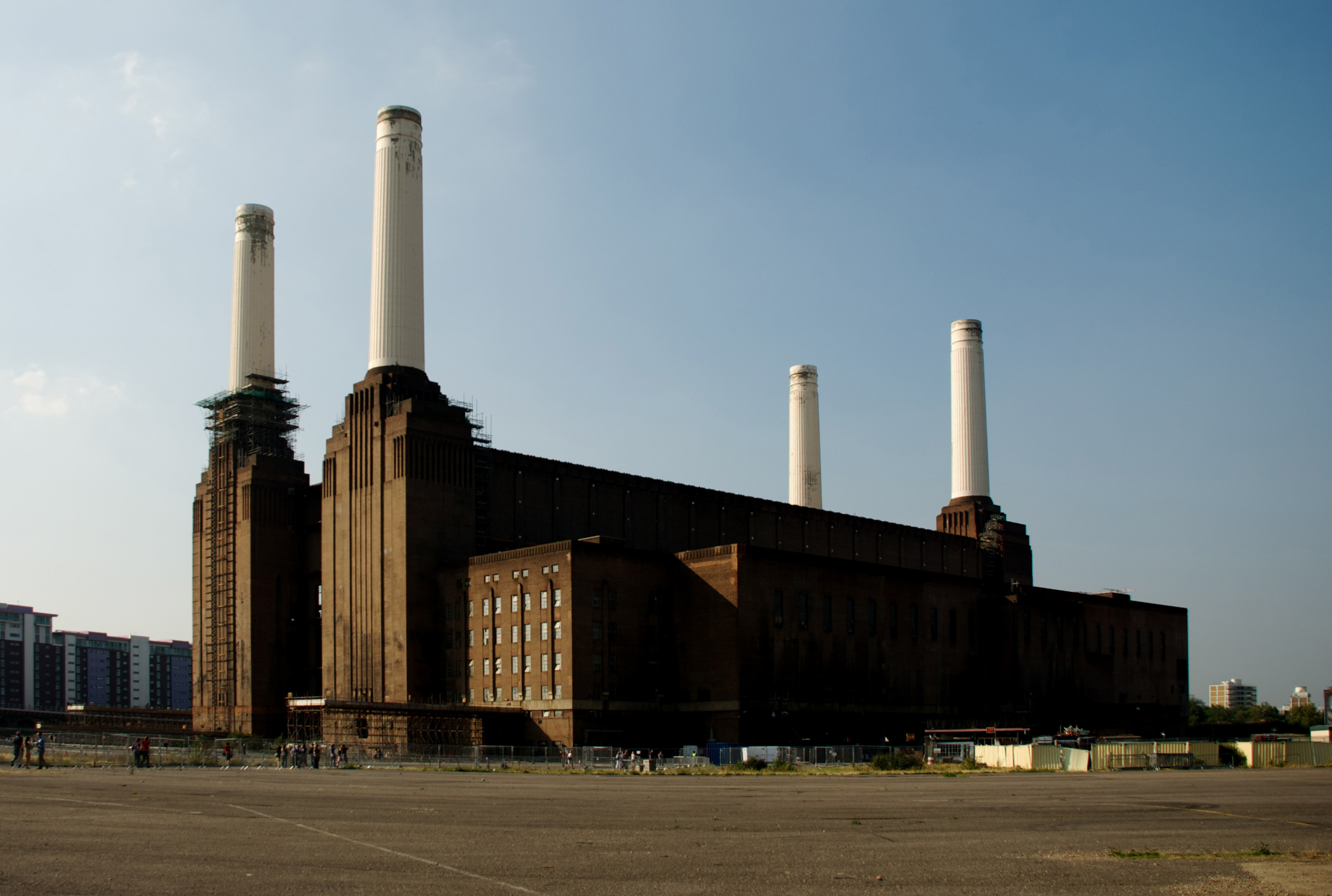
Battersea Power Station

Battersea Power Station was a coal-fired power station on the south bank of the River Thames in Nine Elms, Battersea. Built in two stages as a single building in the 1930s and 1950s, the power station closed in 1983. It is a Grade II* listed building, owing to its size, Art Deco interior fittings and decor, and design by architect Giles Gilbert Scott.

The first major proposal to develop the site in the mid 1980s was for an indoor theme park, by the owners of Alton Towers. The theme park proposal included the 'Battersea Bullet', a dedicated British Rail shuttle train from London Victoria station to the theme park. Owing to the early 1990s recession, the project was cancelled. There were various other proposals, including offices, a shopping centre and a new football stadium for Chelsea FC, as the site passed through several different owners. However, it remained undeveloped for over 30 years. The building was added to the Heritage at Risk Register in 1991, and the World Monuments Fund watch list in 2004.

=== Northern line ===
Until 2015, the previous extension of the Northern line was into South London in 1926, as part of a route to Morden. In the 1980s, a southern extension of the Northern line to Peckham was proposed, as part of a review of potential extensions of Underground lines. The proposal was not implemented.

Throughout the first decade of the 21st century, no plans were considered for extending the Northern line, as the Public Private Partnership (PPP) to upgrade the Underground did not include provision for line extensions within the PPP contracts. Instead, the Northern line was to be upgraded with new signalling, and was proposed to be split into two separate lines by the mid 2020s, following the completion of expansion work at Camden Town tube station. Extensions of the Underground were being considered elsewhere in London, including a proposed extension of the Bakerloo line into south east London.

== History ==
=== Planning and development ===
==== Mid 2000s ====
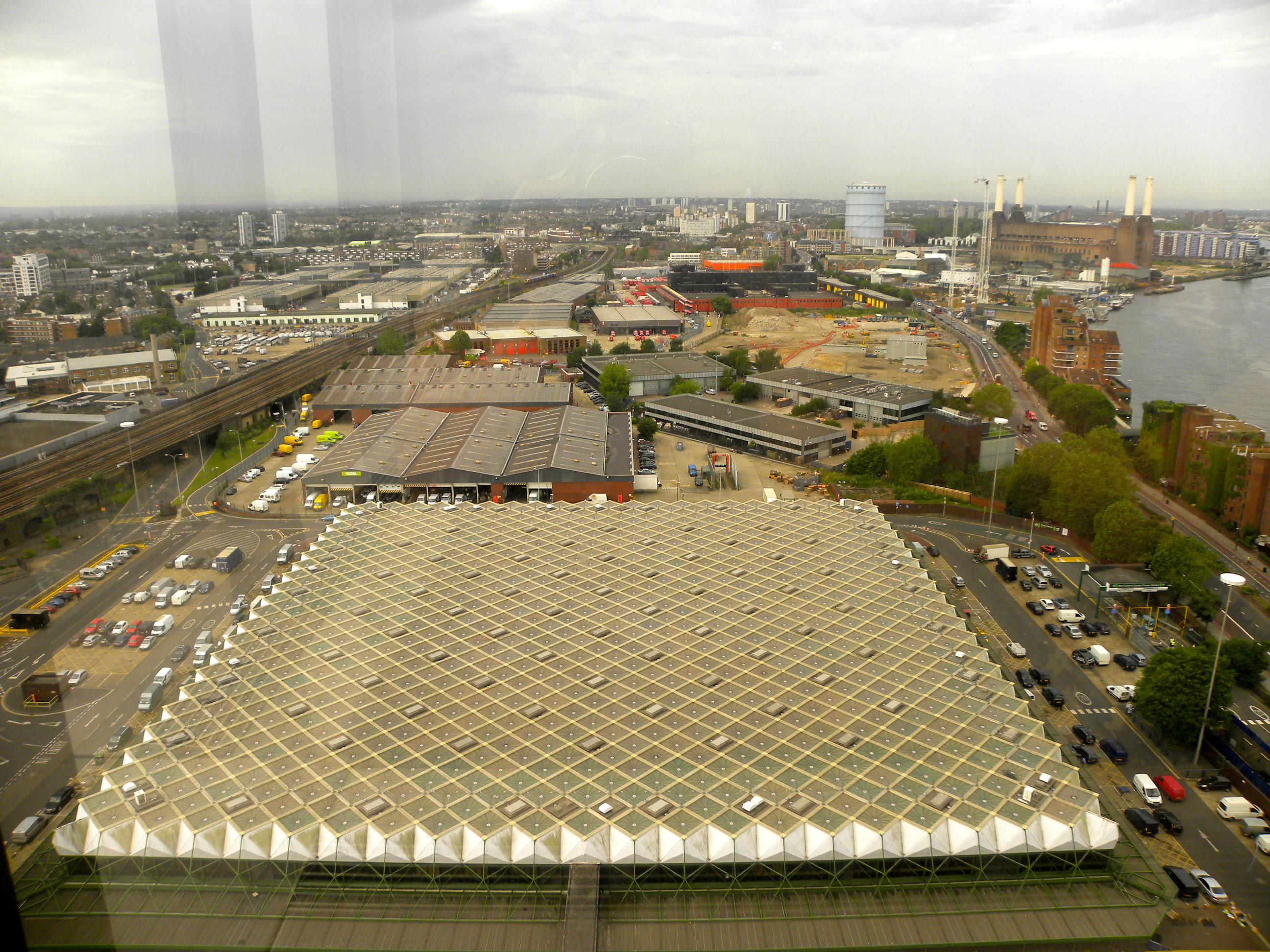
View over the Vauxhall Nine Elms Battersea regeneration area, looking towards Battersea Power Station

In 2006, Irish property developers Real Estates Opportunities (REO) and Treasury Holdings purchased the Battersea Power Station site from Hong Kong property developer Parkview International for £400 million. In 2007, they abandoned the previously approved proposal for redeveloping the site, and appointed Rafael Viñoly to design a new masterplan for the site. Transport consultants assessed what improvements to public transport were required to allow the site to be viably developed. Replacing the previously proposed plan to upgrade Battersea Park station at a cost of £26 million, a privately funded extension of the Northern line was proposed to serve the Battersea Power Station site.

In June 2008, REO and Treasury Holdings announced their plans for the site. Their masterplan proposed refurbishing the power station to include office and retail space, 3,200 new homes and a biomass power station. They announced that they were in discussions with Transport for London (TfL) regarding an extension of the Northern line to serve the site. The developer stated that Vauxhall is the closest Underground station to the site, and said that the station and the Victoria line were already at capacity. In October 2008, the United States ambassador to the United Kingdom announced that the Embassy of the United States would move to a new site at Nine Elms, vacating its Mayfair location at Grosvenor Square. Plans for the embassy were approved in 2009, with infrastructure contributions towards an extension of the Northern line.

In 2009, as part of the development of the Vauxhall Nine Elms Battersea Opportunity Area Planning Framework by the Greater London Authority (GLA), TfL considered the transport options for different amounts of development in the area. Options assessed by TfL included upgrading nearby stations, extending London Underground lines to the site, as well as improving local bus routes. The report concluded that a high level of development in the area would require an extension of the Northern line to Battersea. In July 2009, TfL made clear that there was no funding available in its Business Plan for an extension, and that it would have to be privately funded.

==== Initial route consultation (2010) ====
In April 2010, London Mayor Boris Johnson published the Mayor's Transport Strategy (MTS), which outlined the Mayor's plans for public transport in the capital. This specifically supported a privately funded extension of the Northern line to Battersea, to assist with regeneration of the Vauxhall, Nine Elms and Battersea areas.

In May of that year, REO and Treasury Holdings launched a consultation into the extension of the Northern line to Battersea. As well as increasing the accessibility of their site, the developers noted that the extension would relieve Vauxhall station and serve redevelopment sites in the area including the new US Embassy and New Covent Garden Market. The consultation noted construction could be completed by 2016. Four options were included in the consultation, all extensions of the Northern line from Kennington to Battersea.

- Option 1 – no intermediate stations, providing the fastest journey time to Battersea with the lowest cost. However, the route would not serve Nine Elms or other areas.
- Option 2 – Battersea and a station in south Nine Elms, south of the South West Main Line (SWML). This would serve major development sites and existing residential areas.
- Option 3 – Battersea and an interchange station at Vauxhall station. This would have the highest cost due to complex engineering. Despite the benefit of connecting to the Victoria line and National Rail services at Vauxhall station, it was thought that the route might "exacerbate crowding issues" on the Victoria line and at Vauxhall station.
- Option 4 – Battersea and a station in north Nine Elms, north of the South West Main Line. Although located close to Vauxhall station and the new US Embassy, the route would not serve existing residential areas.

By November 2010, planning permission for the Battersea Power Station project had been granted by Wandsworth Council, with £203 million pledged by the developers towards a future extension of the Northern line. At the end of the year, the scheme was approved by the Mayor of London.

Noting the difficult economic state of the UK due to the 2008 financial crisis, the GLA advised landowners, developers and local council leaders in November 2010 that the extension would be mostly privately funded via developers' contributions, costing the extension at £560 million. Options for funding the extension included direct developer contributions (such as from the Battersea Power Station developers), redirection of the Crossrail Mayoral Community Infrastructure Levy in the local area to the project, and Tax increment financing.

==== Preferred route consultation (2011) ====
Route of the Northern line extension

In May 2011, the preferred route of the extension was announced, using the previously proposed Option 2 via Nine Elms. The Nine Elms station was proposed to be located adjacent to Wandsworth Road and a Sainsbury's supermarket, south of the South West Main Line viaduct. The Battersea station was proposed to be located to the south of the Battersea Power Station development site, adjacent to Battersea Park Road.

Following criticism during the consultation by local residents that route options were not considered, the consultation was extended until August 2011 so that the public could comment on the previously proposed route options. However, Option 2 remained the preferred option. Following feedback during consultation, the project would ensure that a future extension to Clapham Junction station could be built in the future. The consultation noted that the extension could open by 2017, pending potential delays.

In October 2011, a report commissioned by Wandsworth Borough Council showed that the proposed extension had a positive business case, with the potential of delivering up to £4.5 billion in tax receipts across the area. In November 2011, Chancellor George Osborne announced that the UK Government would financially support the extension of the Northern line to Battersea, with the potential creation of an Enterprise Zone in the surrounding area.

==== Power Station developer into administration (2011) ====
In December 2011, Treasury Holdings went into administration, after failing to repay debts of £340 million to Lloyds Banking Group and Ireland's National Asset Management Agency (NAMA). Due to the 2008 financial crisis and the collapse of the Irish property bubble, REO and Treasury Holdings had not been able to find an investor to allow them to proceed with the development. REO had been criticised by investors and potential partners for their high levels of debt, as well as their "overly litigious" approach to business. For the first time in its history, the power station site was put up for sale on the open market. As part of the sale, the £200 million contribution to the Northern line extension remained, as well as the approved planning permission. Despite the sale of the site, Mayor Boris Johnson requested that the planning and development of the extension continue, with responsibility of the project passing to TfL.

In March 2012, the Vauxhall Nine Elms Battersea Opportunity Area Planning Framework was published by the GLA, proposing 16,000 new homes, 500,000 square metres (5,400,000 sq ft) of commercial space and 27,000 new jobs across the area, as well as outlining the infrastructure requirements required to support this level of growth.

==== Power Station sold, further consultation (2012) ====
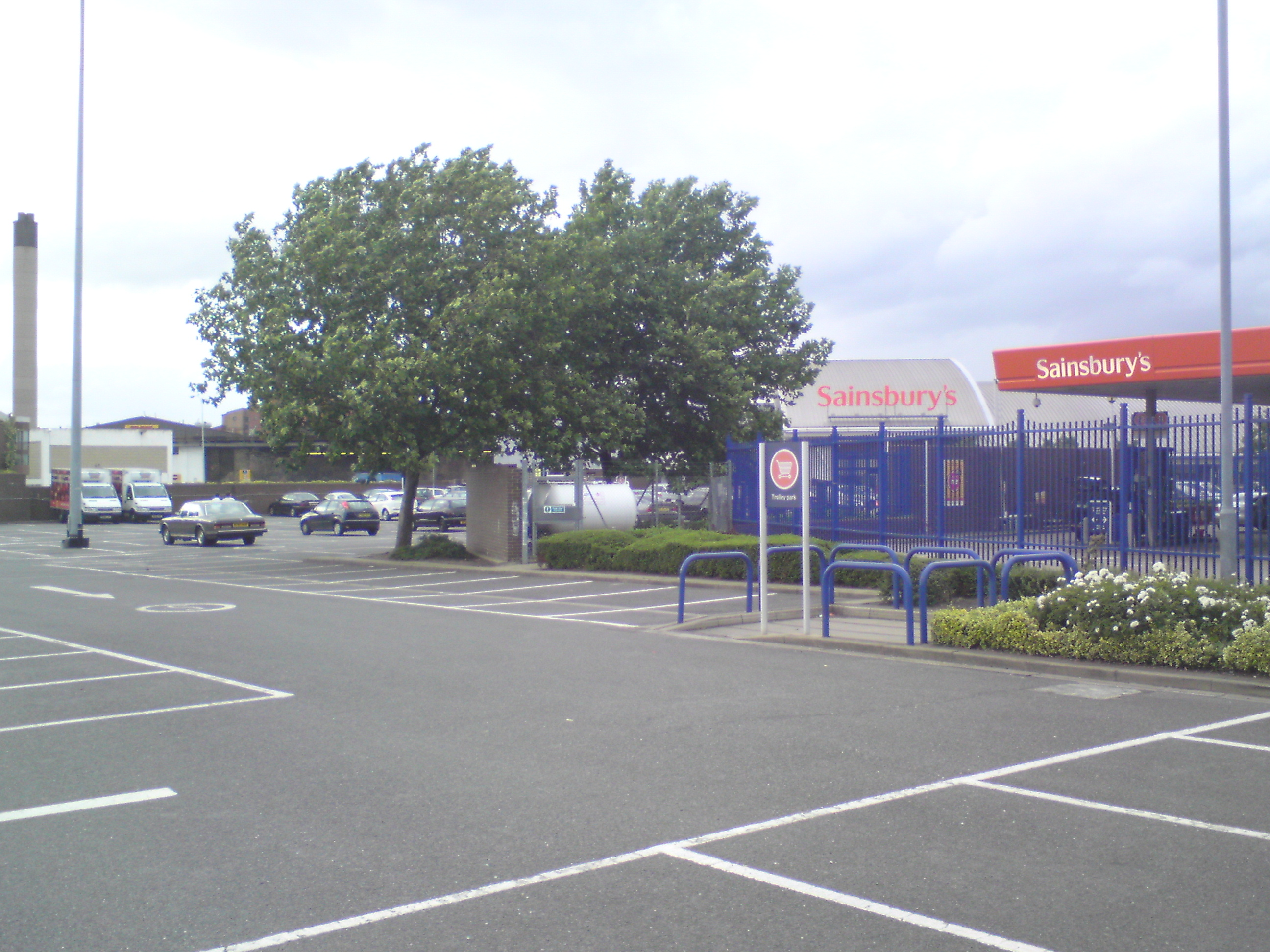
Proposed site of Nine Elms station

In June 2012, the Battersea Power Station site was sold to a Malaysian consortium of companies for £400 million. The consortium included S P Setia (a property company), Sime Darby (a trading conglomerate) and Employees Provident Fund (Malaysia's largest pension fund). The consortium stated that they were in favour of the extension, and confirmed that they would honour the £200 million contribution towards the extension.

In November 2012, TfL launched a consultation into the preferred route, before seeking permission for the extension to be built. TfL had reassessed the various route options and the potential station sites at both Battersea and Nine Elms. Residents were also concerned regarding the potential levels of overcrowding at Kennington station, and TfL were considering if works were required to mitigate this. The proposed station site at Battersea was vacant, and the proposed station site at Nine Elms was being used as a supermarket car park, as well as an office building. This helped ensure that local opposition to demolition (such as the London Astoria for the Crossrail project) was avoided.

Funding for the extension was agreed with HM Treasury in 2012, with the use of tax increment financing and financial contributions by developers to pay back the construction loan over a period of 25 years.

=== Public inquiry ===
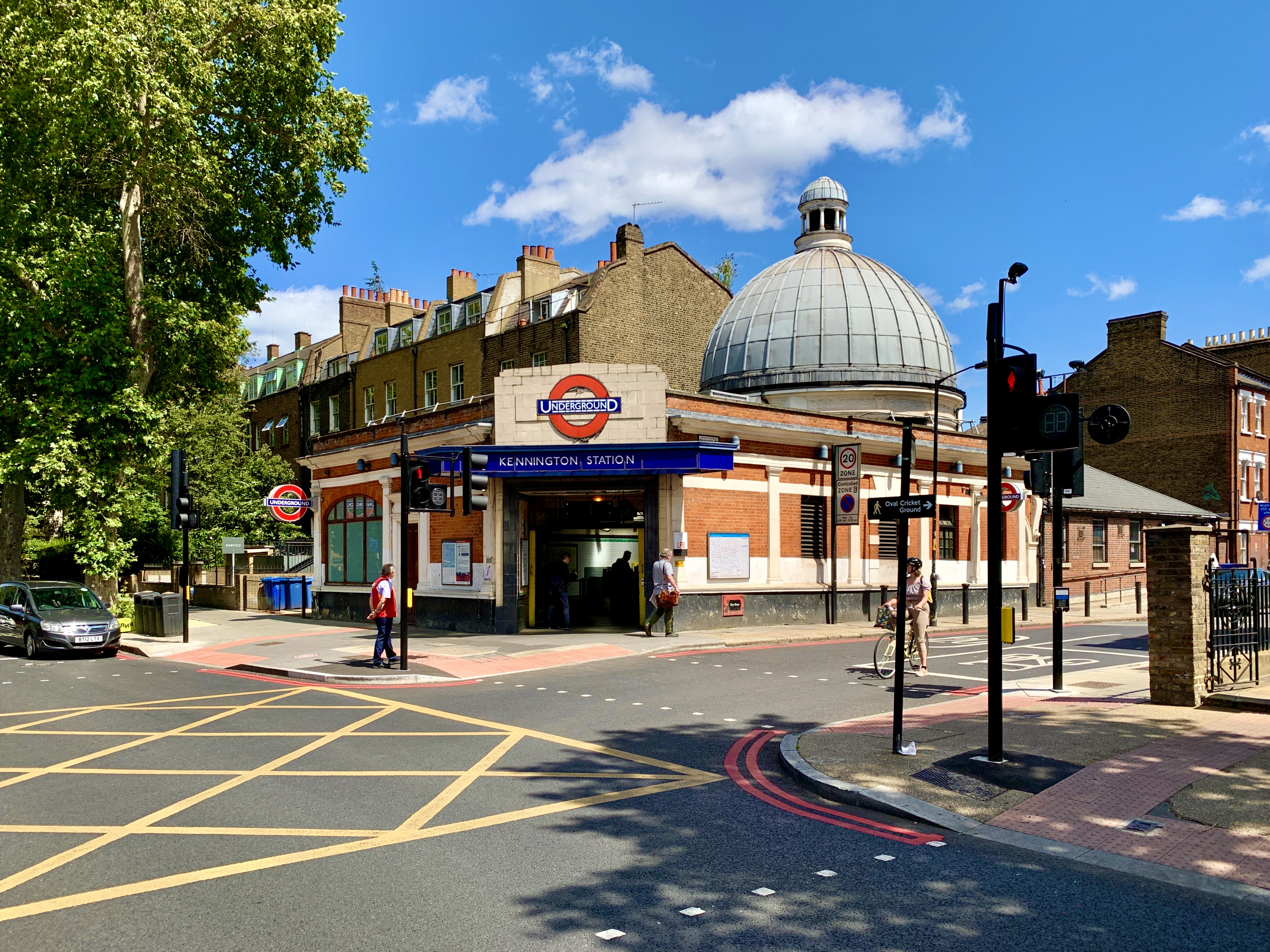
Kennington station, where the extension splits from the existing Northern line

In April 2013, TfL applied for a Transport and Works Act Order to seek permission to build the extension. TfL also began work to appoint a contractor to build the extension, as well as undertaking ground investigation works to understand the soil and subsoil where the new tunnels are to be built. That summer, Prime Minister David Cameron and Prime Minister of Malaysia Najib Razak broke ground on the £8 billion Battersea Power Station development, with Cameron stating that "where once there was little hope of decent public transport links, we have nailed that problem".

On 19 November 2013, the Secretary of State for Transport announced the start of a public inquiry to be conducted by an independent planning inspector, into the proposed construction of the extension. During the inquiry, the inspector heard from those in favour of the extension (such as TfL, the promoter of the extension, as well as other supporters), from those objecting to the extension, as well as points raised by concerned third parties (such as from statutory undertakers).

Points covered in the inquiry included that the extension would only serve one developer, that other alternatives (such as a route via Vauxhall) were not sufficiently tested, impacts on local Conservation Areas and Kennington Park, that an extension to Clapham Junction station should be built, as well as concerns regarding the levels of noise, vibration and dust during construction. The inspector noted that the support of the extension by the three local London boroughs "should not be underestimated", and that there was "strong support from businesses and interests" across the Vauxhall Nine Elms Battersea Opportunity Area and the wider area. TfL's responsiveness was also recognised, acting upon feedback to modifying the scheme to limit concerns, as well as adopting the most "stringent operational noise controls than on any other new underground railway in the UK".

The public inquiry was completed on 20 December 2013. In June 2014, the planning inspector recommended that the scheme proceed along with various recommendations. The extension was given the final approval by Secretary of State for Transport Patrick McLoughlin in November 2014, and was projected to open in 2020 at a cost of around £1 billion.

=== Construction and commissioning ===
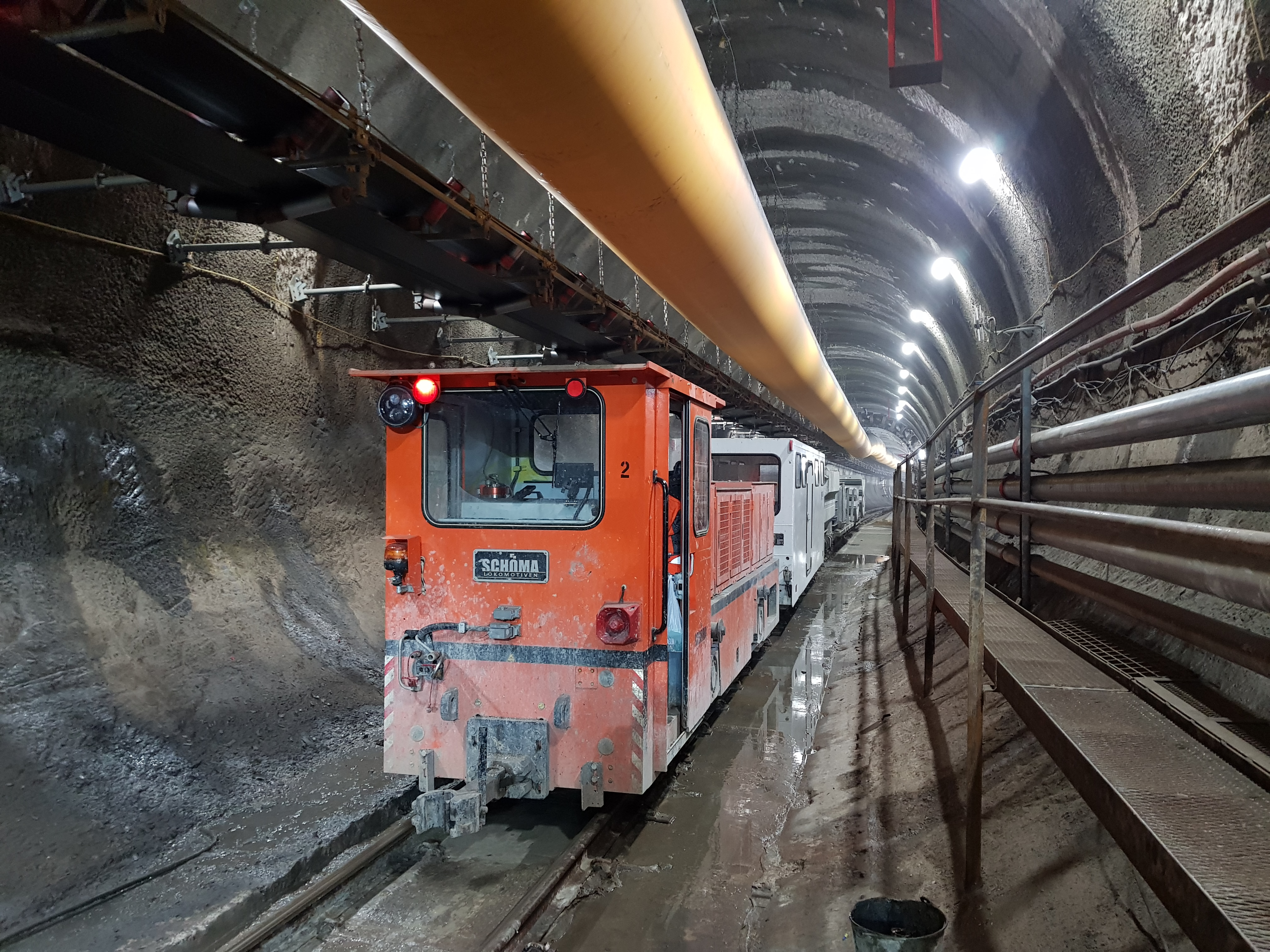
Tunnels under construction, 2017

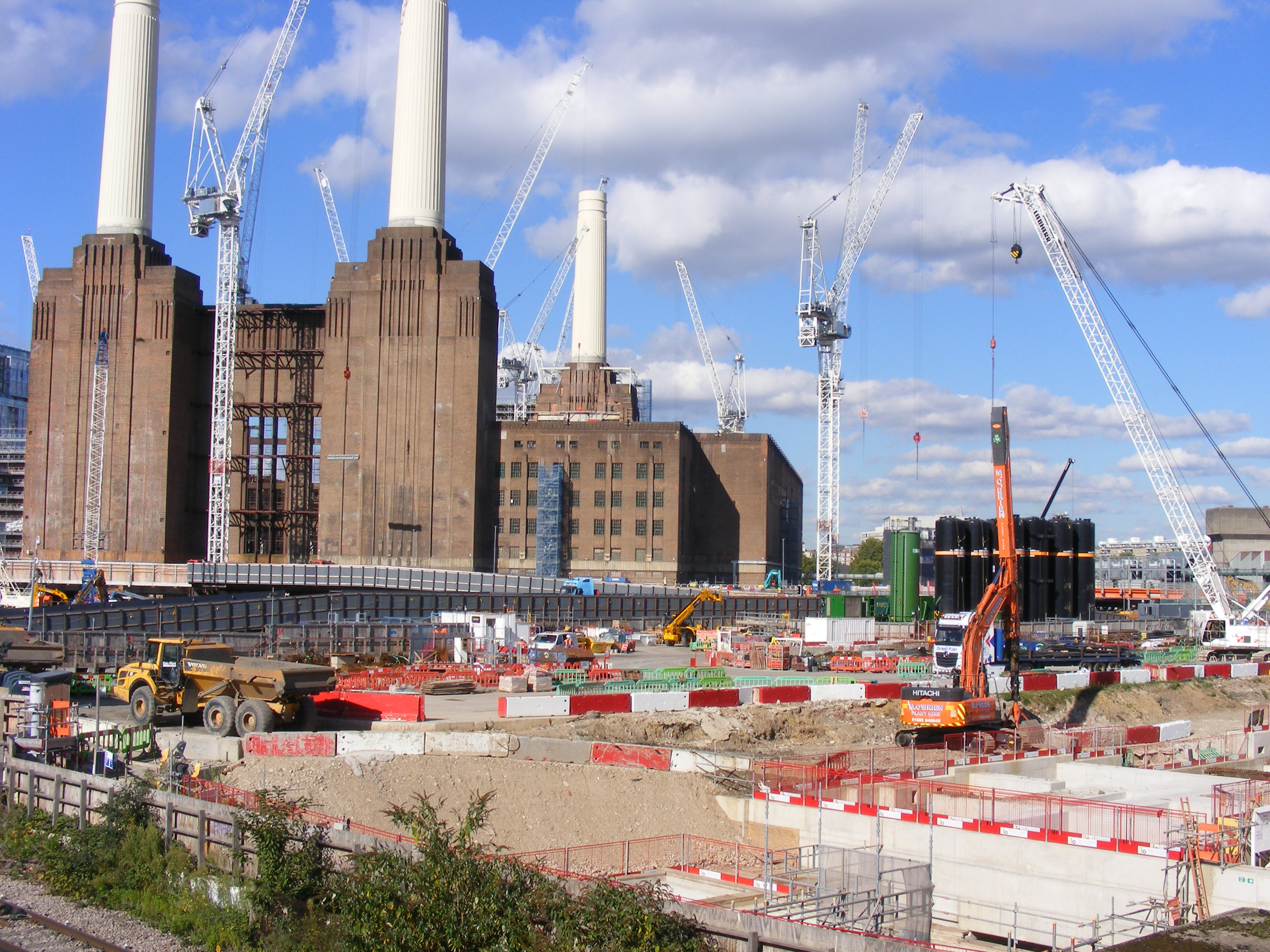
Battersea Power Station station under construction, 2017

In August 2014, Mike Brown, managing director of London Underground, announced that a £500 million six-year contract had been awarded to a joint venture of Ferrovial Agroman and Laing O'Rourke to design and build the Northern line extension to Battersea, with Mott MacDonald as design engineer. Awaiting the final approval, TfL noted that the project could be completed before the Crossrail project, pending any potential delays.

Preparation works started on the route in 2015, with Mayor Boris Johnson officially starting construction on 23 November 2015 at a ceremony at Battersea Power Station. Boring of the tunnels was estimated to begin in 2017, with the extension complete by 2020.

In mid-February 2017, two large tunnel boring machines were delivered to the Battersea construction site, and lowered to tunnel level by a large crane. The boring machines were named Helen and Amy – after the first British astronaut Helen Sharman, and Amy Johnson, the first female pilot to fly solo from London to Australia – following a competition amongst local school children. A 300 m (980-foot) temporary conveyor belt was constructed to transport an estimated 300,000 tonnes of excavated material from the Battersea construction site to the River Thames, where it would loaded onto barges to be transported to East Tilbury to create new arable farmland.

The main tunnelling work started in April 2017 and was completed on 8 November 2017, with a breakthrough at Kennington. Tunnelling work to connect the bored tunnels to the existing Kennington loop of the Northern line was dug by hand, due to risk of impacting the existing Northern line. Following the completion of tunnelling, work began on the installation of rails, power and communication equipment, as well as the station structures themselves.

In July 2017, Wandsworth Borough Council agreed to a request by the developers of Battersea Power Station to reduce the percentage of affordable housing at the development from 15% to 9%, due to the cost of the £266.4 million contribution towards the extension. This was criticised by the Mayor of London, Sadiq Khan, who called the request to reduce the affordable housing 'shameful'.

In December 2017, the detailed designs for Battersea station were approved by Wandsworth Council. In January 2018, the first train travelled over the completed 'step plate' junctions at Kennington that will allow access to the extension. In March 2018, the detailed designs for Nine Elms station were approved by Lambeth Council. In May 2018, Mayor of London Sadiq Khan noted that changes to the design of the development above the future Battersea station by the Power Station developer had increased the cost of the station by around £240 million, and that TfL was seeking to recoup these costs. Work at Kennington to build additional platform cross passages was completed in September 2018.

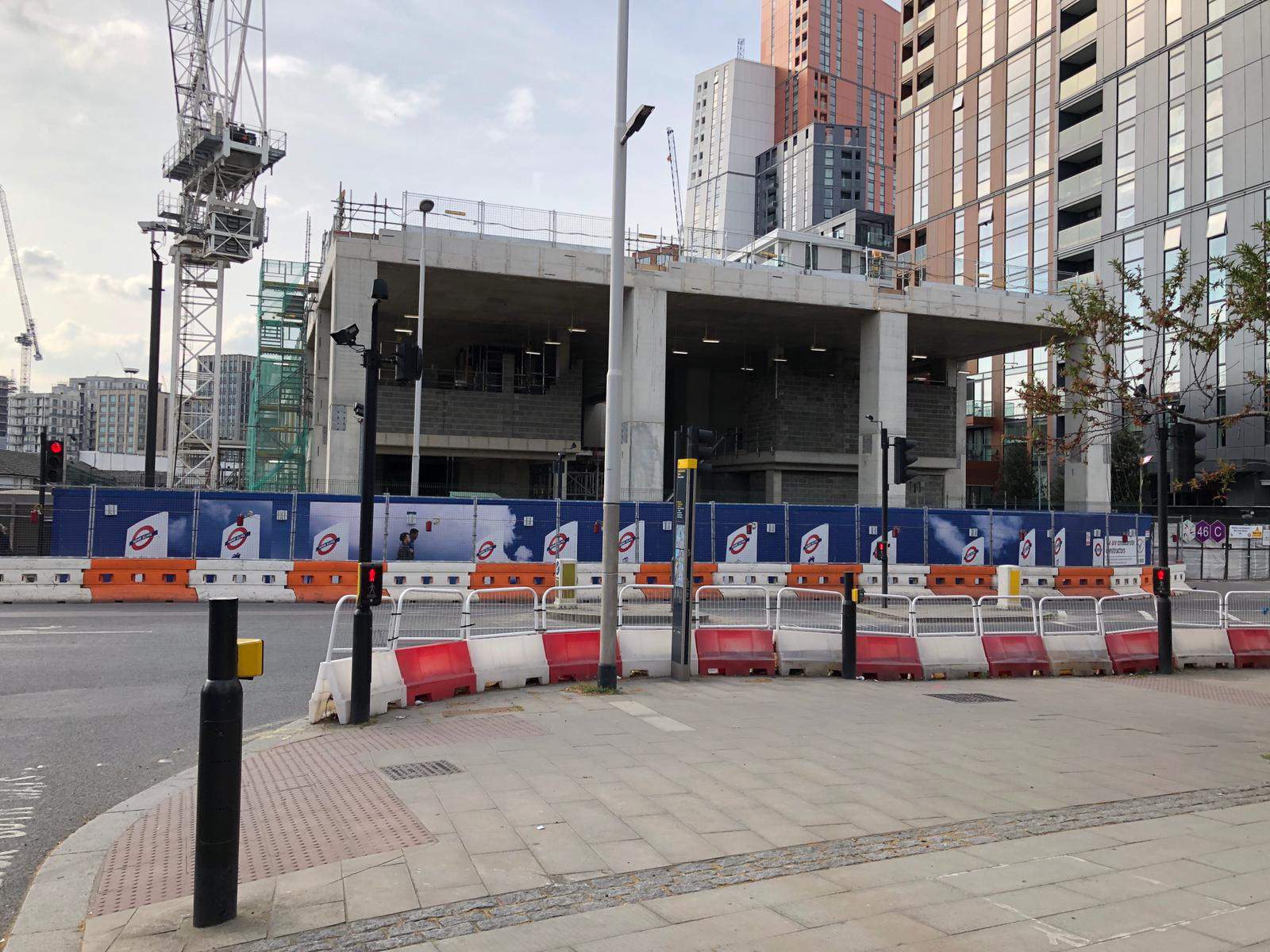
Nine Elms station, nearing completion in April 2019

In January 2019, it was announced that due to a variety of construction delays, the opening of the project would be delayed from December 2020 to 2021. In June 2019, it was announced that installation of track had been completed, and that an engineering train travelled the full length of the tunnel from Kennington to Battersea for the first time. By February 2020, construction of the extension was nearly complete, with platforms, escalators and the Tube Roundel installed in the stations. In the early spring of 2020, work on the extension was paused due to the COVID-19 pandemic. Work resumed at the end of May 2020 with social distancing and other mitigation measures. In July 2020, the roof of the Battersea station was handed over to the Battersea Power Station developer to allow their construction to begin. In late 2020, stations were energised and track traction current turned on. Subsequently, the first 1995 Stock train ran onto the extension over the 2020 Christmas period, marking the start of the signal testing period.

Kennington station was moved from Zone 2 to the Zone 1/2 boundary in May 2021, in preparation for the opening of the extension. In June 2021, it was announced that the extension would have 4G mobile signal, unlike the majority of the tunnelled Underground network in 2021. By summer 2021, final testing and commissioning was underway, with regular test trains running from July 2021.

=== Opening of extension ===
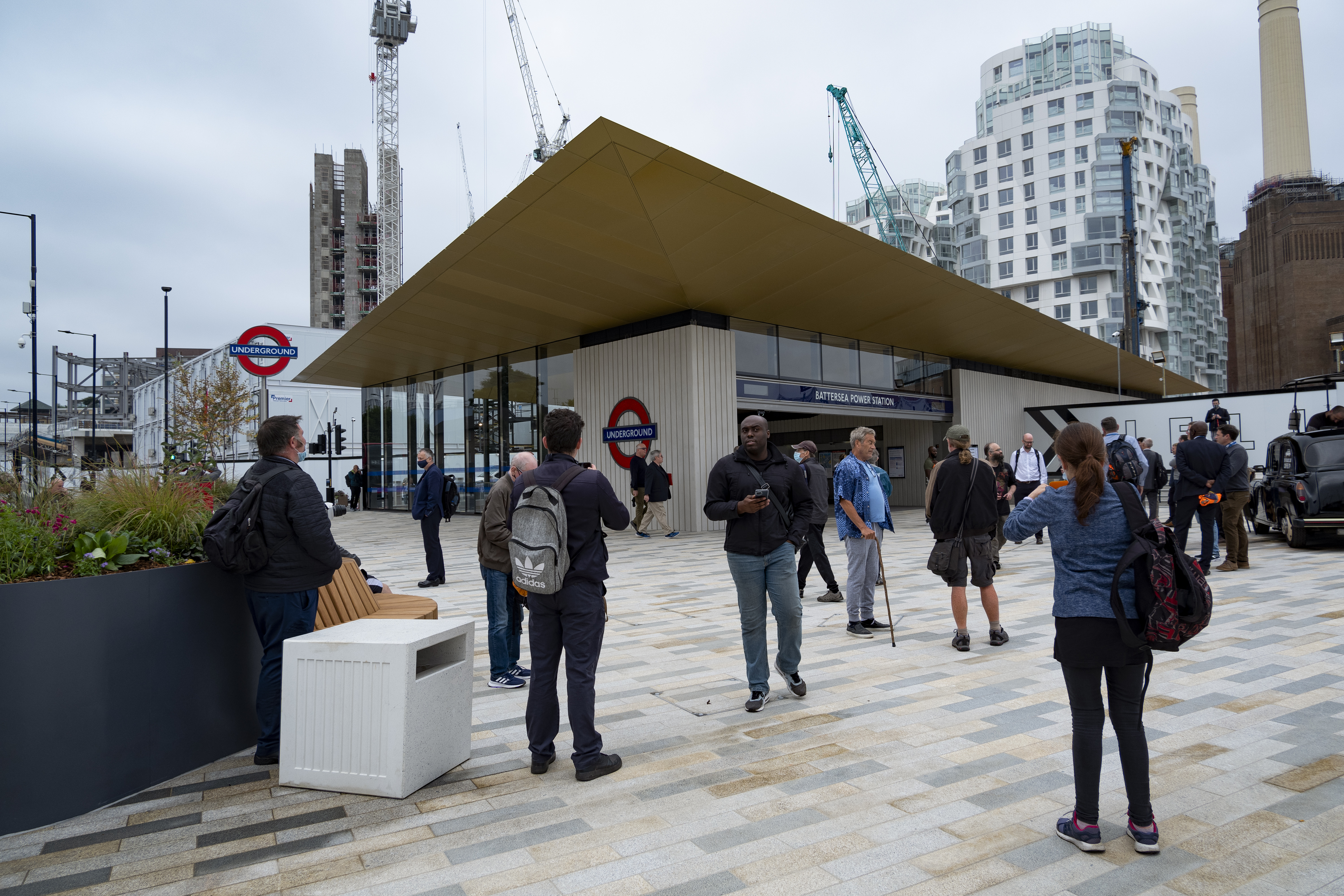
Battersea Power Station station entrance on opening day

The extension was opened on 20 September 2021, the first major extension of the Underground since the Jubilee Line Extension in 1999. The initial peak-time service was six trains per hour, with five trains an hour at off-peak times. The new stations were criticised by disability campaigners, with Alan Benson criticising lifts for being too small and like a "squeezed-in afterthought”. London Assembly Member Siân Berry called the failings "disappointing", and disability charity Scope called the project a "missed opportunity". TfL apologised, stating that they were taking feedback onboard and making changes.

In June 2022, service levels were doubled, following completion of works relating to the Bank station upgrade. In September 2022, TfL announced that over 5 million trips had been made on the extension since opening, with an average of 40,000 trips a week at Nine Elms and 80,000 at Battersea Power Station. Battersea Power Station noted that demand would increase further from October 2022, with the opening of the Power Station as an office and retail complex. TfL estimate that demand could increase to 10 million a year by 2024–25.

In November 2022, Battersea Power Station was awarded the Architects' Journal Architecture Award for Infrastructure and Transport, with praise for the quality of the architecture on the extension overall.

== Route and stations ==
The Northern line extension consists of two new parallel tunnels (3,150 m (10,330 ft) long northbound and 3,250 m (10,660 ft) long southbound), two new stations, and two ventilation shafts. Both stations are fully accessible with step-free access from street to train, and are located in Zone 1. Neither station on the extension has platform-edge doors installed, although provision has been made for future installation should they be required.

Branching off the Northern line at Kennington, the tunnels connect to the Kennington Loop, a loop of tunnel that allows Northern line trains from the Charing Cross branch of the line to turn around. Although the loop remains, the two tunnels branch off it to head south. Two shafts at Kennington Park and Kennington Green provide ventilation and emergency access to the tunnels. Passing underneath Oval tube station and the Victoria line tunnels, the line turns west.

=== Nine Elms station ===
Nine Elms station is located adjacent to Wandsworth Road, and is the only intermediate station on the route. A pedestrian route under the Nine Elms to Waterloo Viaduct allows access to the US Embassy and other developments in Nine Elms. The line continues, slowly turning towards the south to become parallel with Battersea Park Road.

=== Battersea Power Station station ===
Battersea Power Station station is located at the south of the Battersea Power Station development site, a short walk from Battersea Park station. A crossover junction prior to the station allows trains to terminate in either platform. Overrun tunnels underneath Battersea Dogs & Cats Home were proposed, however these were omitted to save money.

| Station | Image | London Borough | Coordinates | Infrastructure | Notes |
|---|---|---|---|---|---|
| Kennington | | Southwark | 51°29′17.8″N 0°6′20.4″W | Additional cross passages to existing station to improve interchange and reduce crowding | Connection to Charing Cross, Morden and Bank branches of the Northern line |
| Nine Elms | | Lambeth | 51°28′48″N 0°7′42.6″W | New station with deep level platforms | |
| Battersea Power Station | | Wandsworth | 51°28′46.2″N 0°8′31.2″W | New station with deep level platforms | Out of station interchange to Battersea Park station Named Battersea during planning stages |

== Design, architecture and art ==
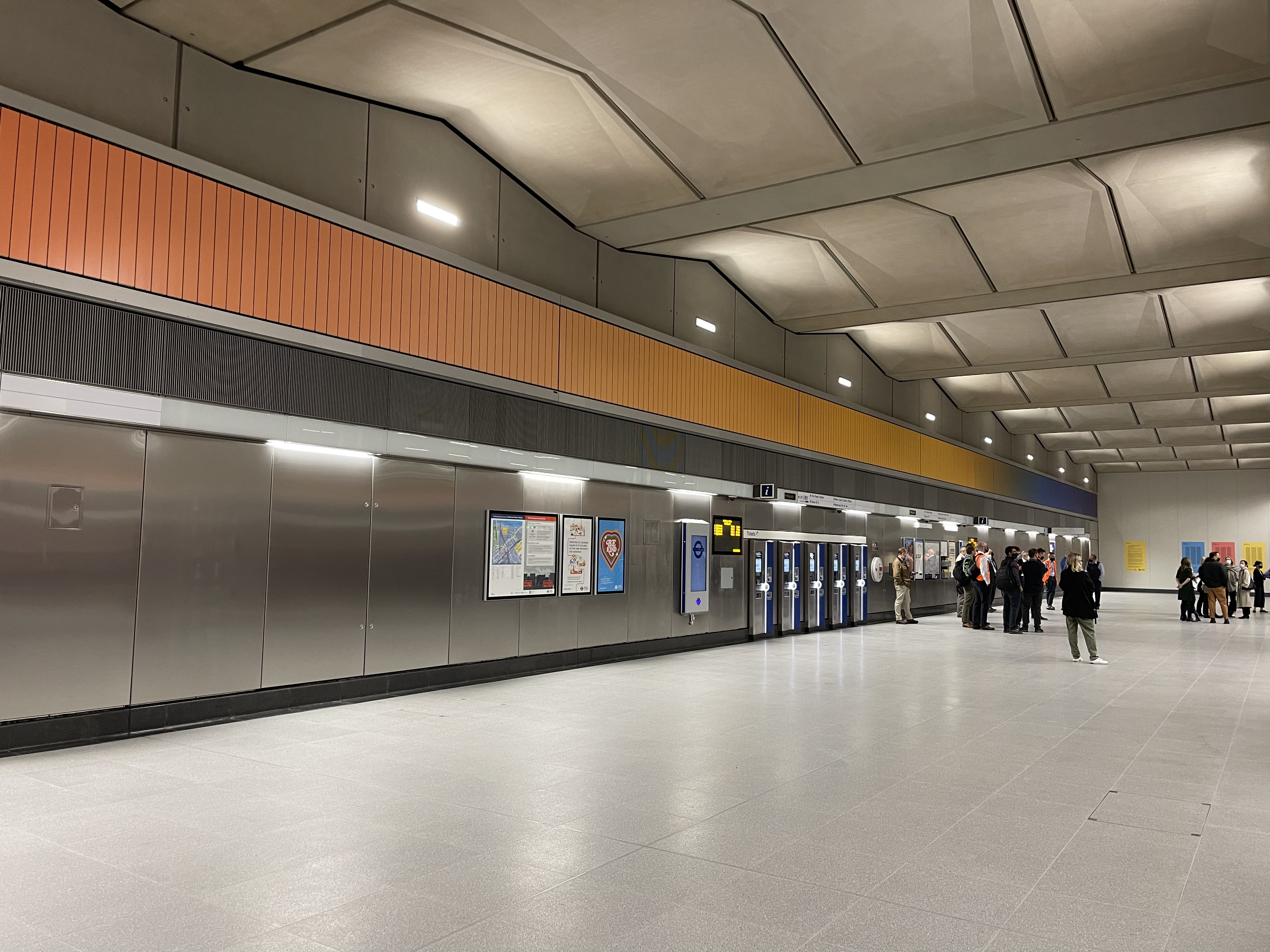
Sunset, Sunrise, Sunset by Alexandre da Cunha

The station buildings at Nine Elms and Battersea Power Station and other structures such as the ventilation head houses in Kennington were designed by Grimshaw Architects. Both stations were built using the cut-and-cover station box method, where the station is built in a large concrete box dug out of the ground.

At Nine Elms, the station was constructed to have a future residential development of 479 new homes designed by Assael Architecture built above the station. This development will be a joint venture between property developer Grainger plc and TfL's property development company Places for London.

=== Artworks ===
Both stations on the extension were to have permanent artworks installed by TfL's contemporary art programme, Art on the Underground. At Battersea Power Station, Brazilian-British artist Alexandre da Cunha installed Sunset, Sunrise, Sunset, a 100-metre (330 ft) kinetic sculpture in the ticket hall of the station, using the obsolete technology of the rotating billboard. The proposed artwork for Nine Elms was not installed for technical reasons, and a new work will be commissioned in the future. During the period of construction, Art on the Underground commissioned two artists, Emma Smith and Nina Wakeford, to undertake temporary artworks, engaging with local residents, construction workers and TfL staff to create them. In October 2023, Labyrinth artworks by artist Mark Wallinger were installed at both Battersea Power station and Nine Elms, marking 10 years of the artworks and the 160th anniversary of the London Underground.

== Impact ==
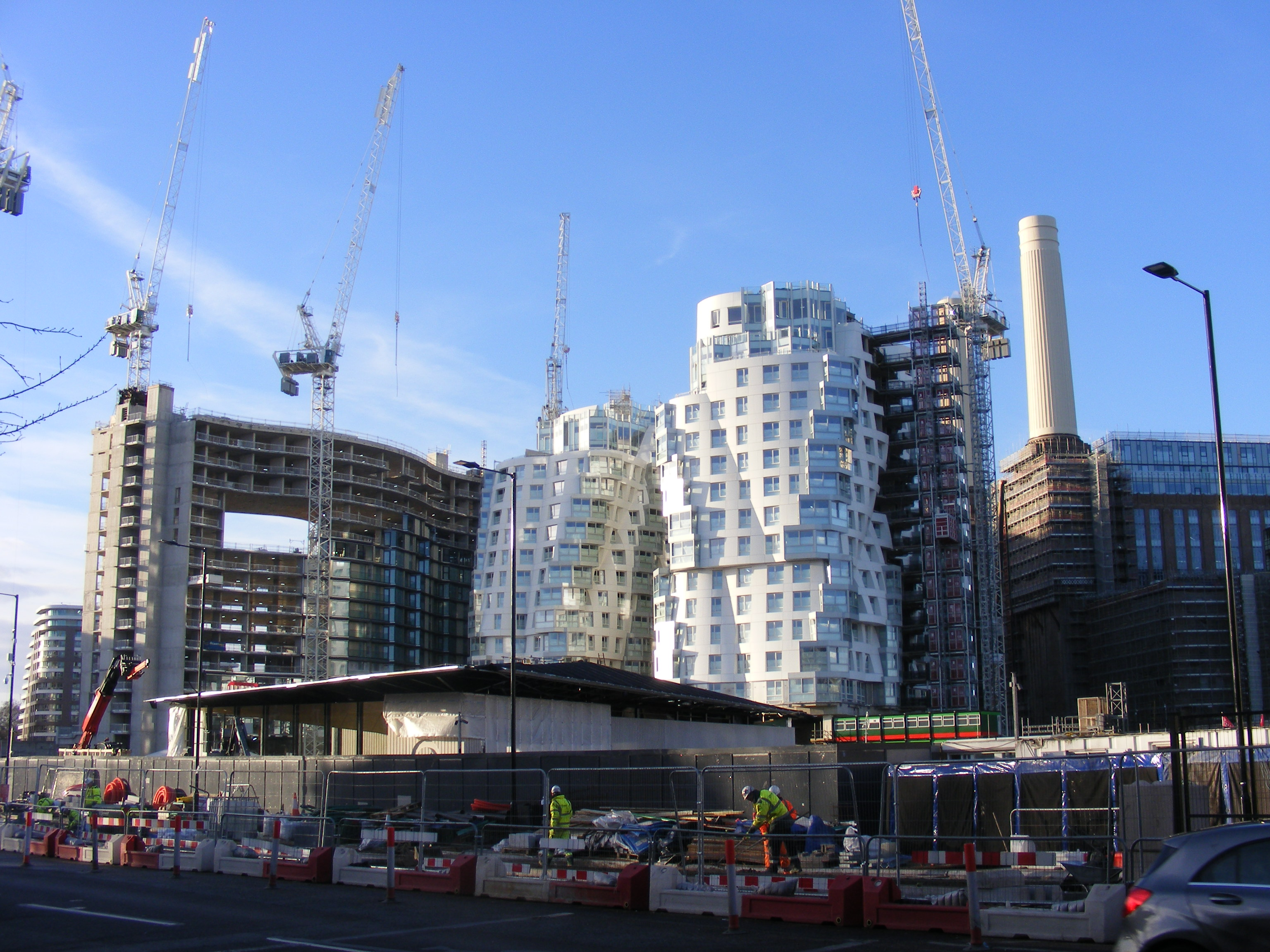
Battersea Power Station development in December 2020, with the tube station nearing completion

The construction of the extension was supported by local boroughs, property developers with redevelopment sites in the area, as well as local people living near the extension. Lambeth and Wandsworth Councils have estimated that around 20,000 new homes and 25,000 new jobs could be provided, and that the extension will support the "regeneration of the Vauxhall Nine Elms Battersea area". Developers and local councils noted that access to major development sites across the area such as Battersea Power Station, Embassy Gardens, New Covent Garden Market and the US Embassy will be improved by the extension, especially that the extension is in Zone 1.

As with the proposed Bakerloo line extension, TfL proposed to use its property development arm Places for London to build residential development above Nine Elms station and at a Kennington worksite following the opening of the extension. This would recoup some of the costs of building the extension, as well as providing long term income for TfL. In 2025, Places for London completed 46 affordable homes for the London Borough of Lambeth, on a site previously used for the construction of the extension.

Transport in the local area has been improved, bringing rapid transit to communities currently served only by buses, as well as the more frequent trains than existing National Rail services from Battersea Park station. In 2022, TfL noted that journey times from the area to the City and the West End have been cut by 50%, with an average journey time saving of 17 minutes. Furthermore, TfL state that the extension will reduce overcrowding on local bus services and at Vauxhall station, as well as on the Victoria and Northern lines. The extension has also increased the number of accessible, step-free Underground stations.

The Vauxhall Nine Elms Battersea regeneration also improved other transport infrastructure in the area, including cycle lanes, a new Thames Clippers river boat pier and an upgrade of Vauxhall Underground station at a cost of £36 million providing step-free access to the Victoria line. Other proposed works have included a new bridge across the River Thames to Pimlico and a planned rebuild of Vauxhall bus station.

=== Criticism ===
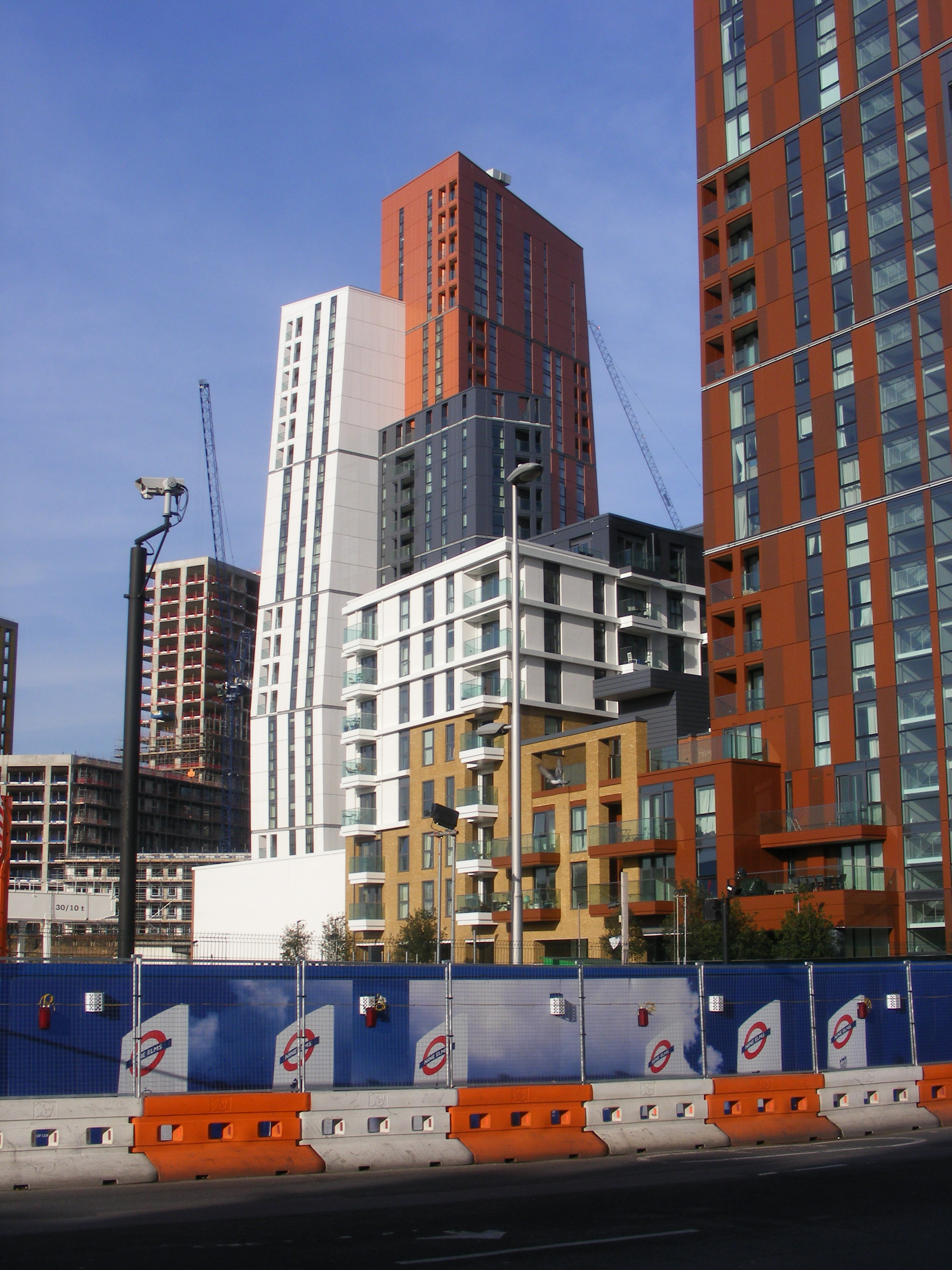
Embassy Gardens development adjacent to Nine Elms station

However, the extension has been criticised for a variety of reasons. The percentage of affordable housing at the Battersea Power Station development was reduced in 2017, partially due to the cost of the £266.4 million contribution towards the extension, drawing scorn from affordable housing advocates. Other commentary has critiqued the developments in the area catalysed by the extension, with concerns regarding high amount of foreign ownership and buy to let property investments, as opposed to local people purchasing properties.

During the public inquiry, the planned extension was also criticised for a perception of an "extension for developers" and that money would have been better spent on other transport projects in London. The potential of gentrification in the Vauxhall, Nine Elms and Battersea areas due to the extension was also noted. The extension has also been criticised for failing to extend to Clapham Junction railway station, one of the busiest stations in the UK, and the busiest station in London not currently on the Underground.

== Cost and funding ==
The extension is estimated to have cost around £1.1 billion to construct. This amount is £160 million below budget, despite construction delays. The extension was funded by a £1 billion loan to the Greater London Authority from the Public Works Loan Board. For the first time in England, tax increment financing will be used to pay back £660m of the loan, using future business rates from the development in the Vauxhall Nine Elms Battersea area, over a period of 25 years. Another £270m will be repaid by developer contributions (Section 106 agreements and Community Infrastructure Levy) in the area.

== Future ==
=== Extension to Clapham Junction ===
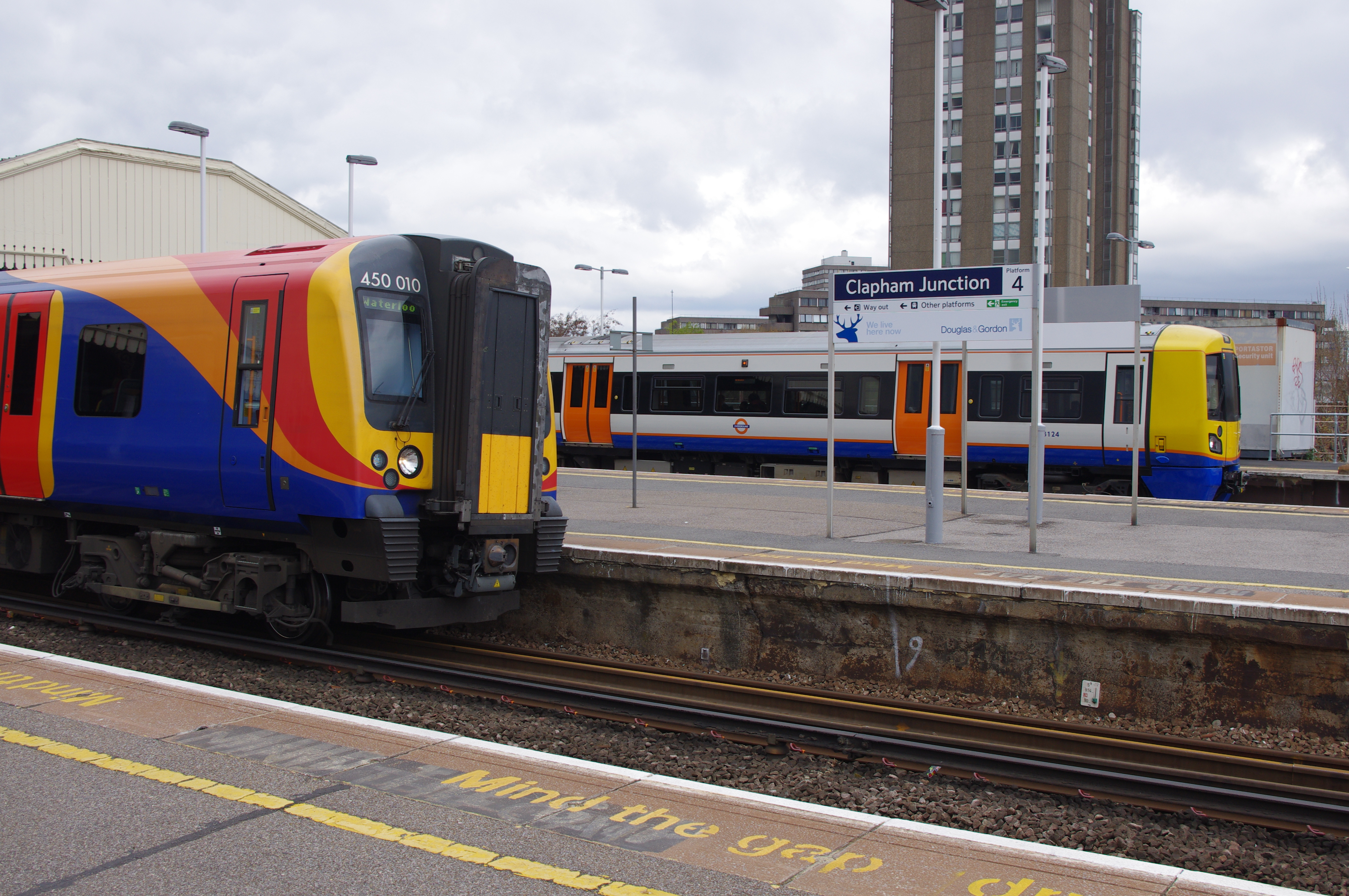
Clapham Junction railway station

Provision has been made for a future extension of the Northern line to Clapham Junction station, with a reserved course underneath Battersea Park. During the public inquiry into the extension in 2014, the inspector noted that although an extension to Clapham Junction would be desirable, it was unnecessary to meet the needs of the Vauxhall Nine Elms Battersea regeneration area. Additionally, it was noted that an extension to Clapham Junction could overwhelm the extension, due to the high demand.

As part of consultations into Crossrail 2 in 2014, the developer of the Battersea Power Station site suggested that Battersea could be the location of a station instead of at King's Road Chelsea. This would provide a link between the area and Clapham Junction station. Despite the proposal for the future Crossrail 2 project to serve the station, local residents and politicians have continued to request a future extension of the Northern line to Clapham Junction. In March 2023, Mayor of London Sadiq Khan stated that the "case for an extension is not readily apparent, given Clapham Junction’s existing high levels of connectivity".

In November 2024, Wandsworth Council announced that an initial feasibility study of an extension to Clapham Junction had been completed, and that there were "no physical engineering or geological constraints that would prevent the tube being extended". It was previously estimated that an extension would cost at least £750m.

=== Potential future split of the Northern line ===
Unlike other London Underground lines, the Northern line has two separate branches (Charing Cross and City) through Central London, meeting at Camden Town and Kennington. TfL has previously proposed splitting the line into two separate lines, with one line running from Edgware to Battersea Power Station via Charing Cross; and the other one running from High Barnet and Mill Hill East to Morden via Bank. This would allow more trains to run on each branch, increasing capacity by around 25%. The extension to Battersea now allows trains on the Charing Cross branch to terminate at Battersea Power Station.

However, a complete split into two lines would require Camden Town station to be rebuilt – given that the station is already severely overcrowded at peak times, and such a split would mean more passengers changing trains at the station. In 2018, plans to upgrade and rebuild Camden Town station were placed indefinitely on hold, due to TfL's financial situation.
