= Labyrinth (Wallinger) =

Artwork by Mark Wallinger in the London Underground

Labyrinth is a 2013 artwork by the British artist Mark Wallinger which marks the 150th anniversary of the London Underground.

== Appearance ==
The artwork consisted of 270 enamel plaques of unique unicursal labyrinth designs, one for every station on the Underground at the time of the installation in 2013. Although the individual shape of each labyrinth is unique, the design language of the labyrinths is identical (black on a white square of vitreous enamel, with a red cross). Each is numbered according to its order in the route taken by the contestants in the 2009 Guinness World Records Tube Challenge. Each labyrinth is located in a publicly accessible part of the station, such as a ticket hall, platforms or waiting room.

== History ==
The permanent artwork was commissioned by Art on the Underground, the contemporary art programme of Transport for London (TfL), as part of the 150th anniversary of London Underground. The artworks were manufactured by the same company that builds London Underground's signage. The first works were unveiled at stations in February 2013, with all 270 installed by the end of 2013.

As part of the 150th anniversary celebrations, Art on the Underground worked with the Royal College of Art and Mark Wallinger to create artistic workshops and events for young people, TfL staff and passengers – based around the Labyrinths.

In October 2014, Art/Books published Labyrinth: A Journey Through London's Underground by Mark Wallinger, a comprehensive photographic book of all 270 labyrinth designs in situ in the Underground stations.

Two new labyrinths were unveiled by Wallinger on 18 October 2023 at Battersea Power Station and Nine Elms stations, which had opened in 2021, increasing the total number of labyrinths to 272. These stations' artworks are numbered 110b and 110a respectively, as they are an extension from Kennington (110). The installation marked the 10th anniversary of the artwork and 160 years of the Tube.

== Bibliography ==
- Coysh, Louise (6 October 2014). Labyrinth: A Journey Through London's Underground by Mark Wallinger. Art / Books. ISBN 978-1-908970-16-9.
