= Nine Elms =

Area of London, England

Coordinates: 51.48°N 0.14°W

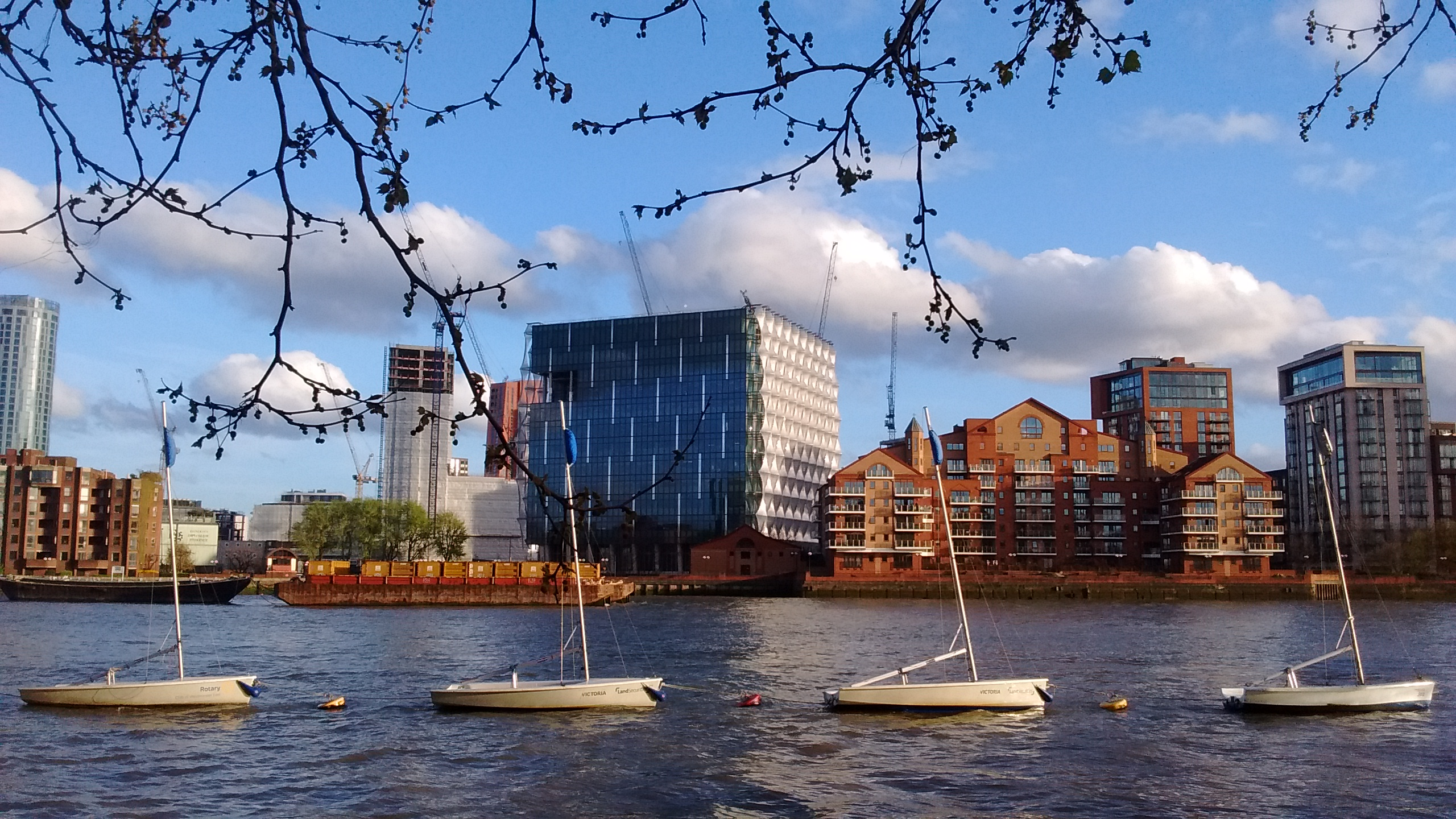
- Embassy of the United States

- Location within Greater London
- London borough: Wandsworth; Lambeth
- Ceremonial county: Greater London
- Region: London
- Country: England
- Sovereign state: United Kingdom
- Post town: LONDON
- Postcode district: SW8, SW11
- Dialling code: 020
- Police: Metropolitan
- Fire: London
- Ambulance: London
- UK Parliament: Battersea
- London Assembly: Merton and Wandsworth; Lambeth and Southwark

Nine Elms is an area of south-west London, England, within the London Borough of Wandsworth, with some parts (including the tube station) extending into the neighbouring London Borough of Lambeth. It lies on the River Thames, with Battersea to the west, South Lambeth to the south and Vauxhall to the east. Across the Thames is Pimlico.

The area was formerly mainly industrial but has become more residential and commercial in character. It is dominated by New Covent Garden Market and Battersea Power Station.

Nine Elms has residential developments along the riverside, including Chelsea Bridge Wharf and Embassy Gardens, and also two large council estates: Carey Gardens and the Savona.

== History ==
A map showing the Nine Elms ward of Battersea Metropolitan Borough as it appeared in 1916

Nine Elms Lane was named around 1645, after a row of elm trees bordering the road, though a path probably existed between York House and Vauxhall from the 1200s. In 1838, at the time of construction of the London and Southampton Railway, the area was described as "a low swampy district occasionally overflowed by the River Thames [whose] osier beds, pollards and windmille and the river give it a Dutch effect".

Nine Elms railway station opened on 21 May 1838 as the first London terminus of the London & South Western Railway (LSWR), which that day changed its name from the London & Southampton Railway. The neo-classical building was designed by William Tite. The station was connected to points between Vauxhall and London Bridge by Thames steam boats. It closed in 1848 when the railway was extended via the Nine Elms to Waterloo Viaduct to a new terminus at Waterloo (then called Waterloo Bridge). The redundant station and the adjacent area, to the north of the new main line, became the LSWR's carriage and wagon works and main locomotive works until their relocation to Eastleigh in 1909. The company's largest locomotive depot was located on the south side of the main line. The buildings were damaged by bombs in the Second World War, and closed in 1967. They were demolished in 1968 and replaced by the flower section of the New Covent Garden Market.

Gasworks were established in 1853, close to the existing waterworks of the Southwark and Vauxhall Waterworks Company. Battersea Power Station was later built on the site.

Vauxhall Motors was formed in 1857 by Scottish engineer Alexander Wilson at Nine Elms, originally as Alex Wilson and Company, before moving to Luton in 1907. There was a plaque commemorating the site of the original factory at the Sainsbury's Nine Elms petrol station on Wandsworth Road which has now been demolished and replaced with a new Sainsbury's superstore and high-rise apartments as part of the current Nine Elms regeneration.

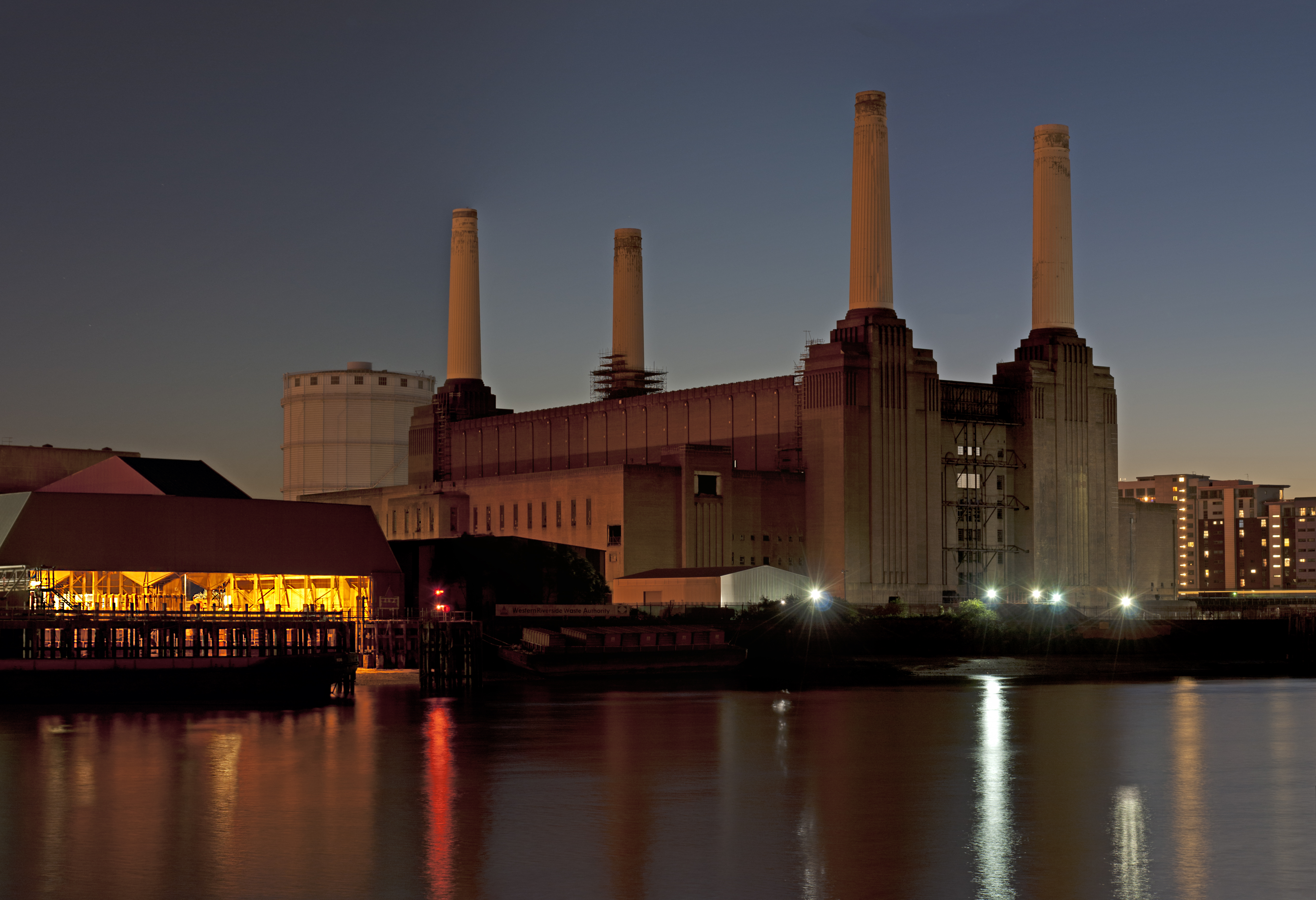
Real Estate Opportunities were granted permission to redevelop the power station in November 2010.

In October 2008, the United States Embassy in London announced that it would relocate to the area, moving from Grosvenor Square, Mayfair; the new embassy was completed in December 2017, and began operating in January 2018.

On 16 February 2012, Wandsworth Council approved Ballymore Group's plans for a 15-acre development. Embassy Gardens is set to provide "up to 1,982 new homes alongside shops, cafes, bars, restaurants, business space, a 100 bed hotel, a health centre, children's playgrounds and sports pitches". In 2014, it was reported that Ballymore had engaged Lazard and CBRE Group to raise about €2.5bn to fund the Embassy Gardens development.

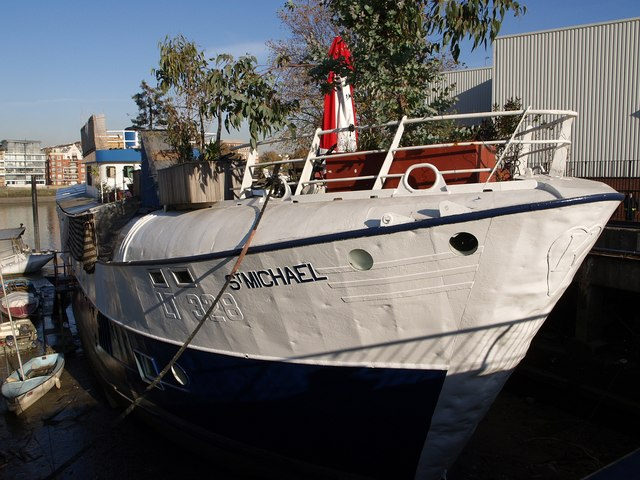
Houseboat in Nine Elms

The Nine Elms and Vauxhall skyline seen from the River Thames (2026)

Regeneration of the area around Battersea Power Station started in 2013, with the power station structure secured by 2016. The Power Station building opened in October 2022. It contains shopping and leisure facilities, office space and housing. To service the area, Nine Elms tube station, on the London Underground, opened in September 2021, as part of an extension of the Northern line from Kennington.

== Governance ==
Previously a part of Queenstown ward, in 2022 Nine Elms ward was created. The next local election is scheduled to take place in May 2026.

== Transport ==
Since 2021, the area has been served by Nine Elms station on the Northern line of the London Underground.

In 2015, Wandsworth council chose a design by Bystrup for a £40m pedestrian bridge between Nine Elms and Pimlico, although as of 2021 there are no firm plans to construct this.

== See also ==
- The Optimists of Nine Elms (1974 film starring Peter Sellers)
