= Places for London =

Property arm of Transport for London

Places for London Limited
- Trade name: Places for London
- Type: Subsidiary
- Industry: Property
- Founded: 2014; 12 years ago
- Headquarters: Stratford, London, England, UK
- Products: Property development
- Owner: Transport for London
- Website: www.placesforlondon.co.uk

Places for London, formerly TTL Properties Limited, is the property-owning arm of Transport for London. Launched in 2015, it was re-branded as Places for London in 2023, as part of a programme of homebuilding. As of 2024, it owns and manages over 5,500 acres (2,200 ha) of land throughout London, making it one of the city's largest landowners.

Places for London plans to build 20,000 new homes across London by the 2030s, with around half of them being affordable housing. Places for London has signed agreements with a wide range of property developers and investors to develop its land. TfL plans to reinvest profits made by Places for London back into the transport network, similar to the Rail + Property model used by the MTR Corporation in Hong Kong. Previously, TfL (and predecessor authorities) sold off land when it was no longer required – such as the sale of 55 Broadway for £120 million.

In February 2023, Network Rail announced a partnership to work with Places for London to develop Network Rail land for new housing. In September 2024, a controversial plan to build housing on the car park of Cockfosters tube station which had been previously blocked by the Johnson government was approved by the Starmer government, allowing it to go ahead. By June 2026, over 1,700 homes had been completed (58% of them affordable homes), with over 4,900 homes under construction.

== Developments ==
- Build to rent residential developments, in partnership with Grainger plc
  - Arnos Grove – 162 new homes built on the existing car park next to Arnos Grove tube station
  - Cockfosters – 351 new homes built on the existing car park next to Cockfosters tube station
  - Kennington – 139 new homes and 29,000 square feet (2,700 m^{2}) of light industrial workspace, on a site previously used for Northern line extension to Battersea construction.
  - Nine Elms – 479 new homes built above Nine Elms tube station
  - Southall – 460 new homes on a site previously used during Crossrail construction
- Developments in partnership with Helical plc
  - Bank – 139,000 square feet (12,900 m^{2}) of new office space built above the new entrance to Bank station on Cannon Street
  - Paddington – 235,000 square feet (21,800 m^{2}) of new office space built above the eastern entrance to Paddington station adjacent to the Paddington Arm
  - Southwark – Student accommodation and 44 new affordable homes built above Southwark tube station
- Residential developments, in partnership with Barratt London
  - High Barnet – 300 new homes, built on the existing car park next to High Barnet tube station
  - Wembley Park – 450 new homes, built on the former car park next to Wembley Park tube station
  - Bollo Lane, Acton – 900 new homes, built on an industrial site currently used by TfL
- Residential developments, in partnership with Ballymore Group
  - Limmo Peninsula – around 1,400 new homes, on a site previously used for DLR and Crossrail construction.
  - Edgware – redevelopment of the bus garage and Broadwalk shopping centre, with 3,500 new homes and 460,000 square feet (43,000 m^{2}) of retail and leisure space.
- Hounslow West – 348 new affordable homes, built on the existing car park next to Hounslow West tube station. Partnership with housing association A2Dominion
- Southwark – 19,000 square feet (1,800 m^{2}) of commercial space and 34 new homes, on a site previously used for Jubilee Line Extension construction in the 1990s. Partnership with Landsec
- Former Earls Court Exhibition Centre site – 4,000 new homes and 2,500,000 square feet (230,000 m^{2}) of commercial space. Partnership with Delancey
- Kidbrooke Village – 619 new homes, built on a previously vacant site adjacent to the A2. Partnership with Notting Hill Genesis
- South Kensington – 50 new homes, commercial and office space, built around South Kensington tube station. Partnership with Native Land
- "Ultra-rapid" electric vehicle charging stations – 25 sites proposed across London. First site at Hatton Cross opened in 2026. Partnership with Fastned.

=== Completed developments ===
- Beechwood Mews – 97 new homes alongside the A406 North Circular Road in Finchley, completed 2022.
- Blackhorse Road – 350 new homes in partnership with Barratt London and Quadrant, completed 2023.
- Fenwick South – 46 affordable homes on a site previously used for construction of the Northern line extension to Battersea. Partnership with the London Borough of Lambeth, completed 2025.
- Bond Street – 102,000 square feet (9,500 m^{2}) of new office space above the Elizabeth line station, in partnership with Grosvenor Group. Completed 2025.
- Barkingside – 98 new homes, built on a site previously used as a builder’s yard. Partnership with Countryside Partnerships and Peabody. Completed 2026.

== Future projects ==
TfL proposes to use Places for London to build on top of stations when construction of the Bakerloo line extension is completed. This would recoup some of the costs of building the extension, as well as providing long term income for TfL. Due to financial impacts of the COVID-19 pandemic, work to implement the extension is currently on hold.
