= Alexandre da Cunha =

Brazilian-British artist

- Born: 1969 (age 56–57); Rio de Janeiro, Brazil
- Education: Royal College of Art and Chelsea College of Arts, London
- Known for: Sculpture and wall mounted work using found objects

Alexandre da Cunha (born 1969) is a Brazilian-British artist, who produces sculpture and wall mounted works, often using found objects. His works have been exhibited around the world, and are located in several major public collections.

== Biography ==
Alexandre da Cunha was born in Rio de Janeiro in 1969. After initial studies at Fundação Armando Alvares Penteado in Brazil, da Cunha moved to the United Kingdom in the late 1990s, studying sculpture at the Royal College of Art before moving to the Chelsea College of Arts. Since his studies, da Cunha lives and works in both London and São Paulo.

In the early 1990s, da Cunha began working with Galeria Luisa Strina, the oldest contemporary art gallery in Brazil – with his first solo exhibition taking place in 1998.

== Work ==
In his work, da Cunha mixes the use of found, mass produced and 'ready made' objects with 'traditional' sculpture – by repurposing and reusing them. In 2006, he stated that the items that he uses often have no monetary value, describing them as "things I found on the streets ... ready for the garbage can". For example, the 2004 work Skateboarderistismatronics (fan) is made of recycled skateboards – da Cunha stated that the old skateboards are worthless, but nevertheless they have "huge personal value" to the skaters themselves. Despite the variety in the size of his works – from a small sculpture to a concrete mixer – the aesthetic of the artwork is balanced against the social and cultural history of the materials that the work is made from. In 2015, he exhibited a circular composition originally made out of a used cleaning mop.

His works are inspired by the Neo-Concrete Brazilian art movement of the late 1950s, Op art, well as modernist architecture found in major Brazilian cities. da Cunha also frequently uses the tropes of national identity, such as flags and iconography, in his work. Frieze states da Cunha's "historical lineage" includes classical sculpture, baroque patterns, Primitivism, Arte Povera, and Brazilian Modernism.

In the late 2010s, da Cunha was commissioned by Art on the Underground to create a public artwork for the new Northern line extension to Battersea. His work at Battersea Power Station – Sunset, Sunrise, Sunset – is a 100-metre-long kinetic sculpture, using the technology of a rotating billboard. As the COVID-19 pandemic meant that the 2020 New Contemporaries exhibition could not take place, da Cunha and artists Anthea Hamilton and Linder selected works for an online exhibition.

== Exhibitions ==
Da Cunha has exhibited works at a variety of solo and group exhibitions across the world since the 2000s. Solo exhibitions have included:

- Duplex, Brighton CCA, Brighton, England (2021)
- Duologue with Phillip King, Royal Society of Sculptors, London, England (2018)
- Mornings, Office Baroque, Brussels, Belgium (2017)
- Free Fall, Thomas Dane Gallery, London, England (2016)
- Homebodies, Museum of Contemporary Art, Chicago, United States (2015)
- Dublê, Centro Cultural São Paulo, São Paulo, Brazil (2011)
- Laissez-Faire, Camden Arts Centre, London, England (2009)

== Collections ==
- Tate Collection and Tate Liverpool, United Kingdom
- Zabludowicz Collection
- Museum of Contemporary Art, Chicago, Illinois
- Laumeier Sculpture Park
- Museu de Arte da Pampulha, Belo Horizonte, Brazil
- Institute of Contemporary Art, Boston, Massachusetts
- Pérez Art Museum Miami, Florida

== Public artworks ==
- Sunset, Sunrise, Sunset, Battersea Power Station tube station, London
- Mix, Monsoon Building, London
- Plaza (Arcade), Fenway, Boston, United States
- Mix II, Rochaverá Corporate Towers, São Paulo

== Publications ==
- Alexandre da Cunha: Arena (2020, Thomas Dane Gallery; ISBN 9781999615765)
- Alexandre da Cunha: Monumento (2019, Revolver; ISBN 978-3-95763-462-7)
- Drawing Room Confessions: Alexandre da Cunha (2015, Drawing Room Confessions; ISBN 9788867491520)
- Alexandre da Cunha (2012, Editora Cobogó, ISBN 978-85-60965-26-7)
