= Nine Elms to Waterloo Viaduct =

Railway viaduct in south London, England

Coordinates: 51.4919°N 0.1194°W

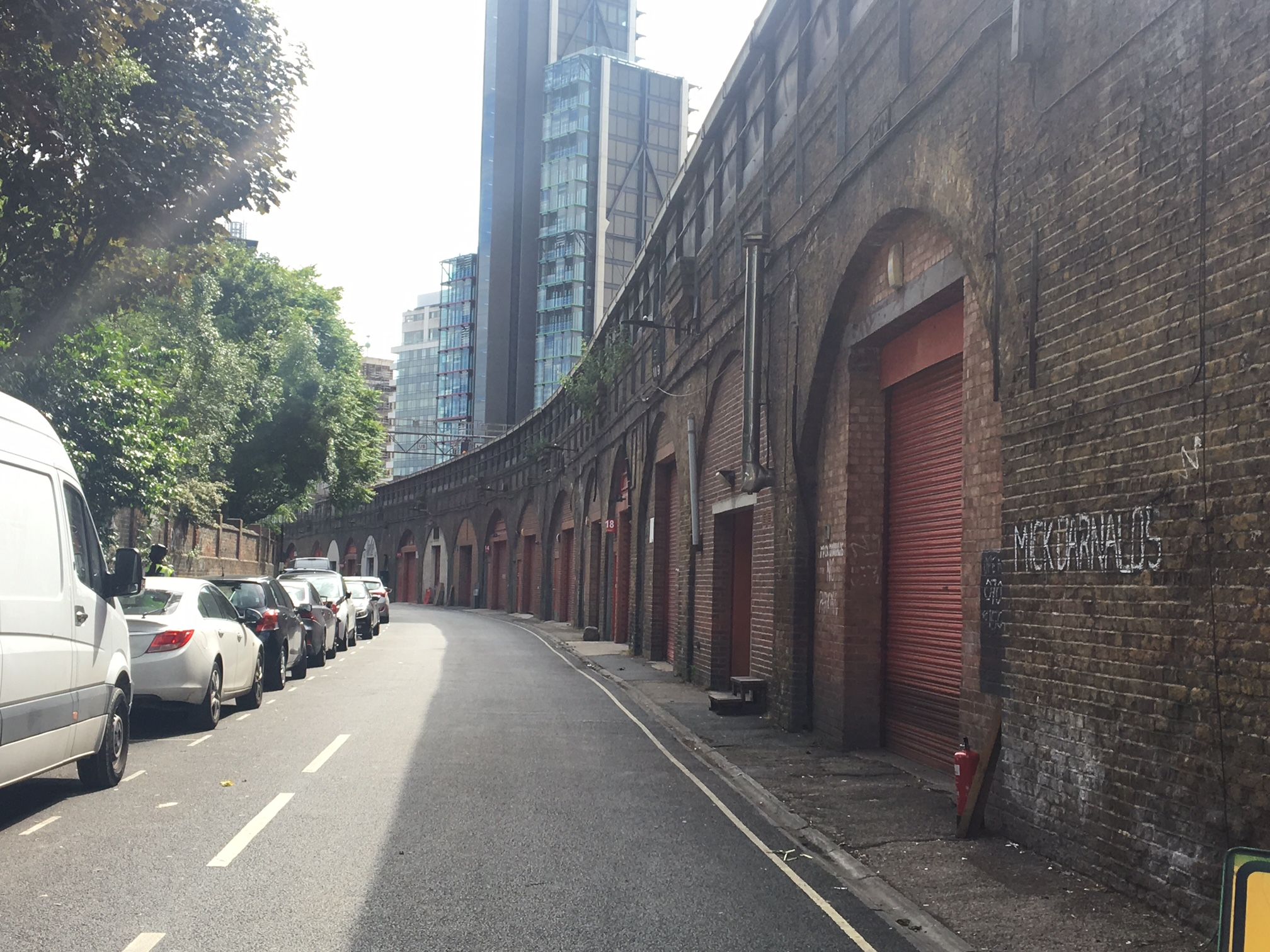
Seen here from Salamanca Street in Lambeth, the viaduct was completed in 1848 in order to extend the London & South Western Railway from Nine Elms to Waterloo.

The Nine Elms to Waterloo Viaduct is a large Victorian railway viaduct in south London. The viaduct is 2 miles (3.2 km) in length and carries the South West Main Line into Waterloo station. Initially constructed in 1848, the viaduct begins in Nine Elms and with an intermediate station at Vauxhall incorporated within the viaduct, the viaduct terminates at Waterloo. The viaduct comprises six iron girder bridges, with a combined weight of 800 long tons (810 tonnes), and over 290 arches (excluding those beneath the Waterloo Bridge terminus). The brick sections of the viaduct are composed of some 80,000,000 bricks. The viaduct is managed by Network Rail, who in turn lease many of the arches for commercial, retail and industrial use.

== History ==
In the mid-19th century, the original London and South Western Railway terminus was located at Nine Elms on the south-western edge of what was then the urban limit of developed London. To facilitate easier entrance for goods and passengers into central London, the railway sought a “Metropolitan Extension” from Nine Elms to Waterloo Bridge. A four-track extension was authorised by the London and South-western Railway Metropolitan Extensions Act 1845 (8 & 9 Vict. c. clxv) on 31 July 1845 with a supplementary act, the London and South Western Railway (Widening and York Road Station Enlargement) Act 1847 (10 & 11 Vict. c. lxxxviii) providing an additional two tracks; the capital authorised was estimated at £800,000. The work was carried out under the direction of the engineer Joseph Locke. Running through the ancient parishes of Battersea and Lambeth the construction was reported to have displaced about 700 houses. It dissected the areas of Vauxhall and Lambeth, creating an artificial divide.

Passage underneath the viaduct is obtained through one of the many tunnels constructed underneath the viaduct for street level access. It was stated that one glassworks, one engineering works, the Royal Swimming Baths and a church (All Saints Church) were all demolished for the construction of the viaduct. However, the viaduct was built to avoid some major landmarks at the time, including the Vauxhall Pleasure Gardens and Lambeth Palace and for this reason does not follow a straight route to Waterloo.

The opening of the viaduct and line was planned for 30 June 1848, but the Board of Trade Inspector did not approve some of the large-span bridges at the eastern end, however his superior was satisfied by later load tests, and the line opened on 11 July 1848. Further widening of the viaduct took place between 1877 and 1868 and again from 1898, when an eight-track railway all the way through from Waterloo to Clapham Junction was completed (taking until 1910 to be fully completed).

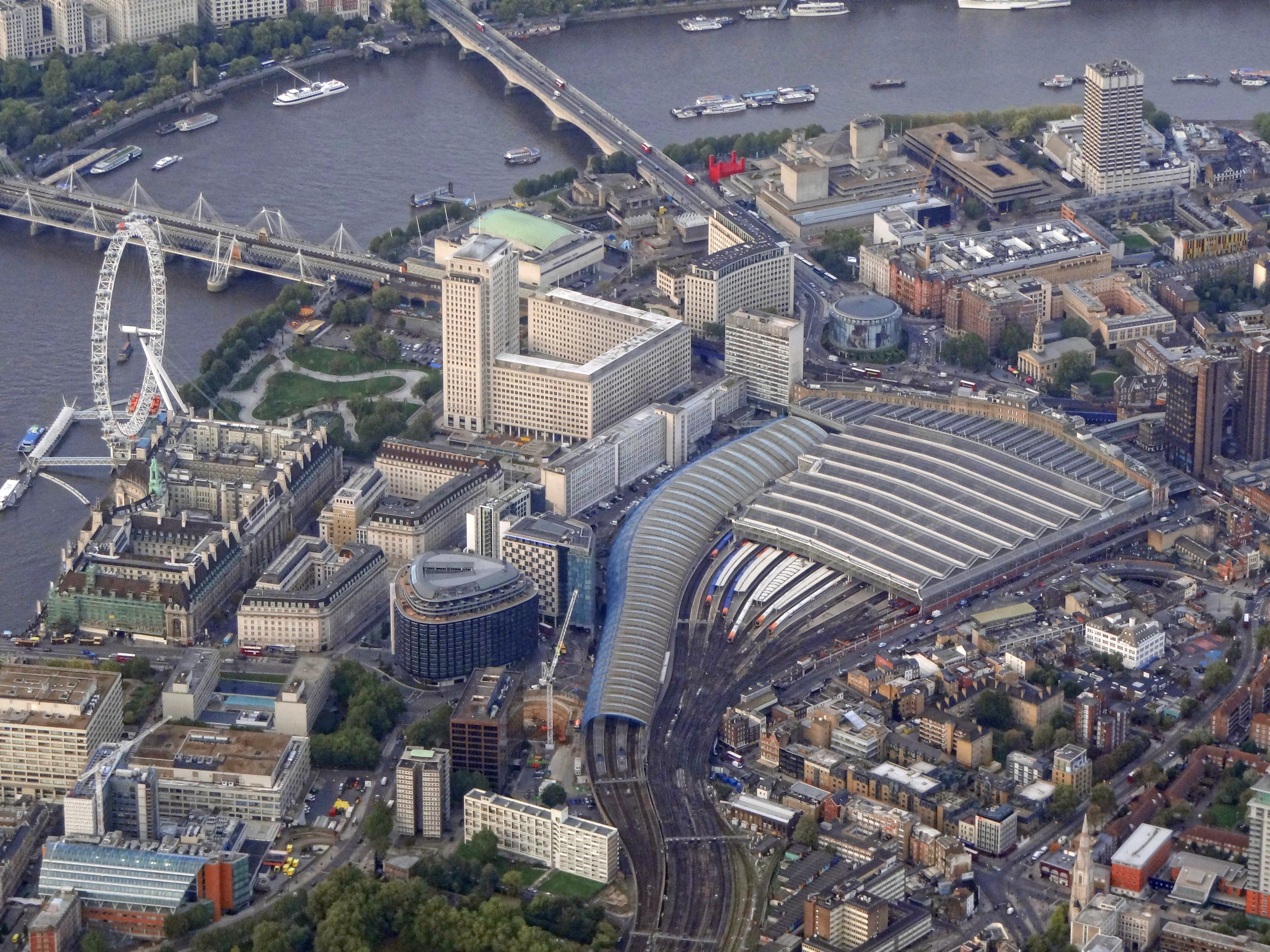
An aerial view showing the viaduct and the South West Main Line to its terminus at Waterloo

A 70m section of the viaduct's ageing parapet collapsed unexpectedly during engineering work on Christmas Day 2020.

In the 2020s, an arch through the viaduct was opened up as a pedestrian route as part of the Northern line extension to Battersea. 'Arch 42' will allow easier access through the Nine Elms area, as well as improving access from Nine Elms station to developments such as the US Embassy and Embassy Gardens.

== Stations ==
The viaduct still has two railway stations, the first is an intermediate station at Vauxhall incorporated within the viaduct and the second is the terminus at London Waterloo. The Nine Elms station was discontinued upon the opening of the Waterloo station.
