= Battersea Power Station tube station =

London Underground station

Battersea Power Station
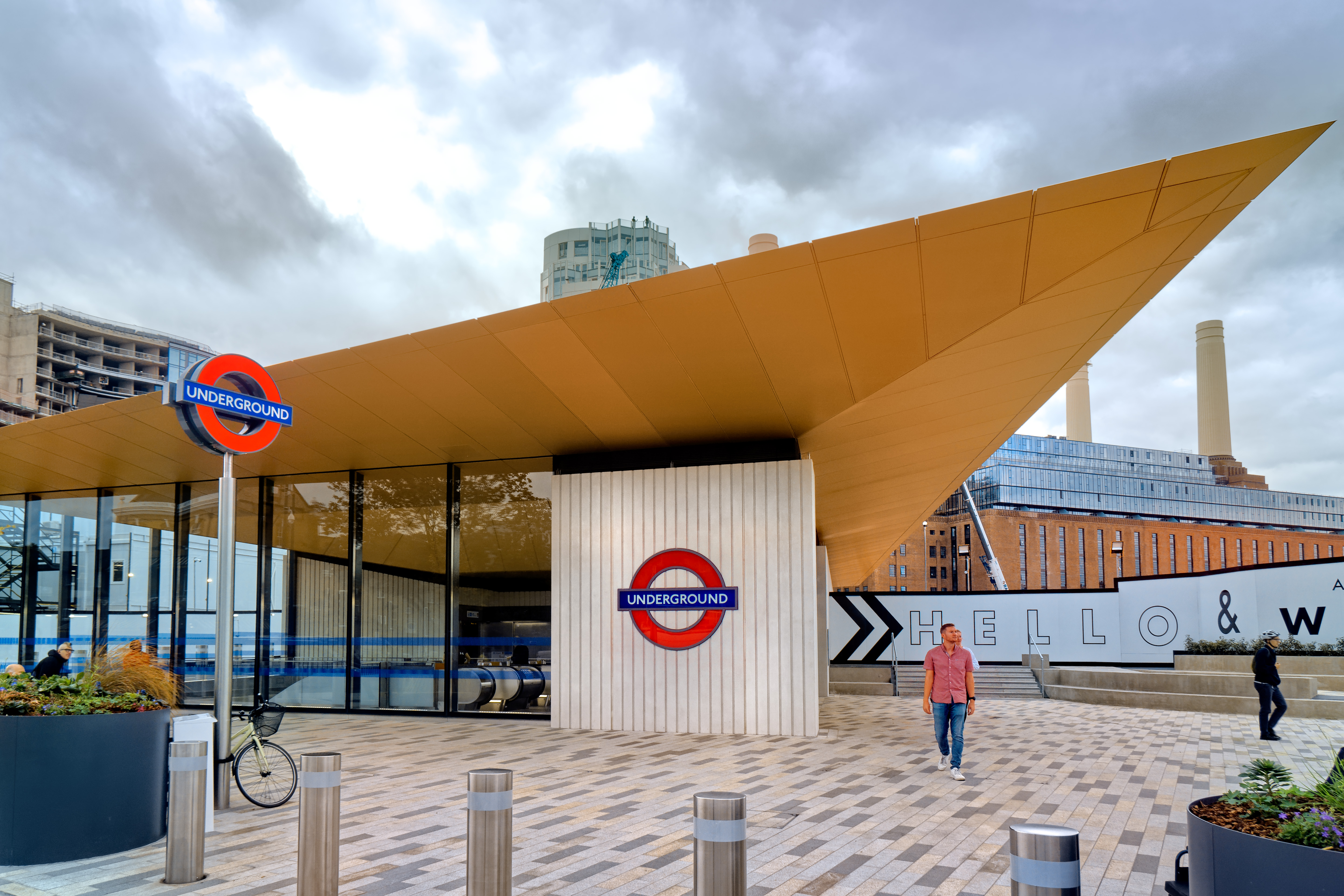
- Station exterior in September 2021
- Interactive map of Battersea Power Station

General information
- Location: Battersea
- Local authority: London Borough of Wandsworth
- Managed by: London Underground
- Owner: Transport for London
- Number of platforms: 2
- Accessible: Yes
- Fare zone: 1
- OSI: Battersea Park; Queenstown Road

London Underground annual entry and exit
- 2021: ▲2.18 million
- 2022: ▲8.65 million
- 2023: ▼8.40 million
- 2024: ▲8.85 million
- 2025: ▼8.62 million

Key dates
- 20 September 2021: Opened

Other information
- Coordinates: 51.47950°N 0.14200°W

Battersea Power Station is a London Underground station in Battersea, London, which forms the terminus of the Northern line extension to Battersea.

The station, partially funded by the redevelopment of Battersea Power Station, serves the redevelopment site and Battersea itself. The station is located on Battersea Park Road, close to Battersea Park railway station and within walking distance from Queenstown Road railway station, forming an out-of-station interchange with both stations. The station opened along with the extension of the Northern line on 20 September 2021. It is the only station on the London Underground network to include the word 'station' in its name.

== Services ==
The station is in London fare zone 1 and is served by the Northern line as part of the extension from Kennington to serve the redevelopment of Battersea Power Station. Trains from Battersea Power Station run via Charing Cross only, as the branch extends off the Kennington loop. The next station in the branch towards North London is Nine Elms.

The station serves as the terminus for the new branch, with a crossover junction before it, allowing trains to terminate on either platform. Overrun tunnels underneath Battersea Dogs & Cats Home were proposed; however, these were omitted to save money. Provisions have been made for a possible extension to Clapham Junction railway station. The station also serves as an out-of-station interchange with Battersea Park railway station.

The service pattern in trains per hour (tph) is:

- 8 tph to High Barnet via Charing Cross (increases to 10tph in the peak)
- 2 tph to Mill Hill East via Charing Cross

Preceding station	London Underground	Following station
Nine Elms towards Edgware, Mill Hill East or High Barnet	Northern line Battersea branch	Terminus

=== Connections ===
Various London Buses routes serve the station.

== Design ==
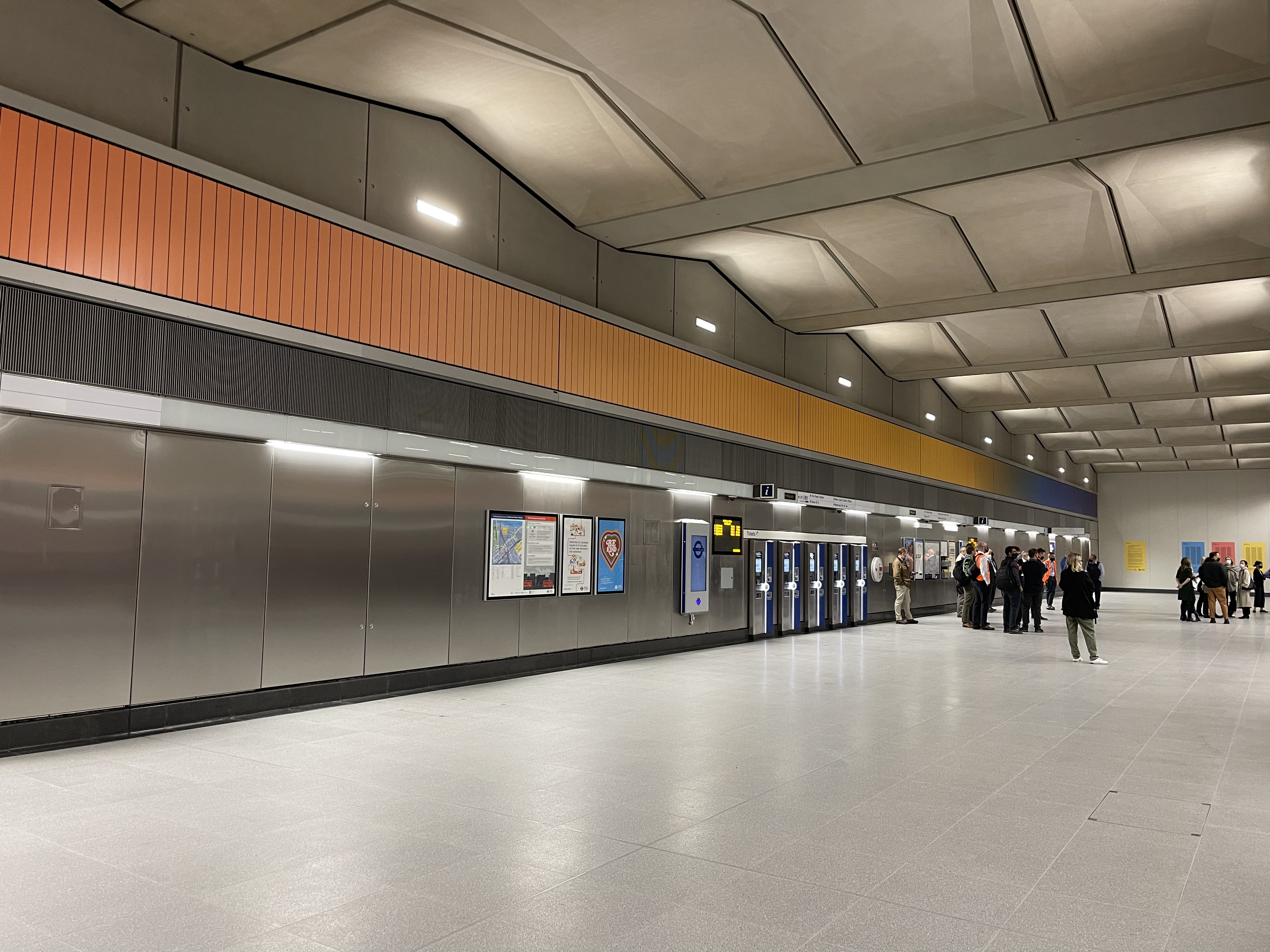
Sunset, Sunrise, Sunset by Alexandre da Cunha

The station was designed and built by a joint venture between Laing O'Rourke and Ferrovial Agroman, with station entrance canopy designed by Grimshaw. The station design allows for the future installation of platform screen doors.

Art on the Underground commissioned the artist Alexandre da Cunha to install a permanent piece of artwork in the ticket hall of the station: a 100 m (330 ft) kinetic sculpture using a rotating billboard entitled Sunset, Sunrise, Sunset. In October 2023, a Labyrinth by artist Mark Wallinger was installed at the station, marking 10 years of the artworks and the 160th anniversary of the London Underground.

== History ==
=== Construction ===
The station was given final approval by the Secretary of State for Transport in November 2014, before construction began in 2015, with completion originally scheduled for 2020. Tunnelling of the Northern line extension began at Battersea, with the two tunnel boring machines, Helen and Amy, departing the site in March 2017 to dig the running tunnels of the extended line.

In the draft edition of the Transport for London (TfL) "Business Plan 2014", issued as part of the TfL Board papers for their meeting on 10 December 2014, the map TfL's Rail Transport Network at 2021 labelled the terminus as "Battersea Power Station", instead of just "Battersea" as had appeared on previous publications. In December 2015, TfL confirmed that the station would be named "Battersea Power Station". This means it is the only station on the Underground with the word "station" in its official name. There has been some confusion as to whether to construct the name as "Battersea Power (S/s)tation" or "Battersea Power Station station".

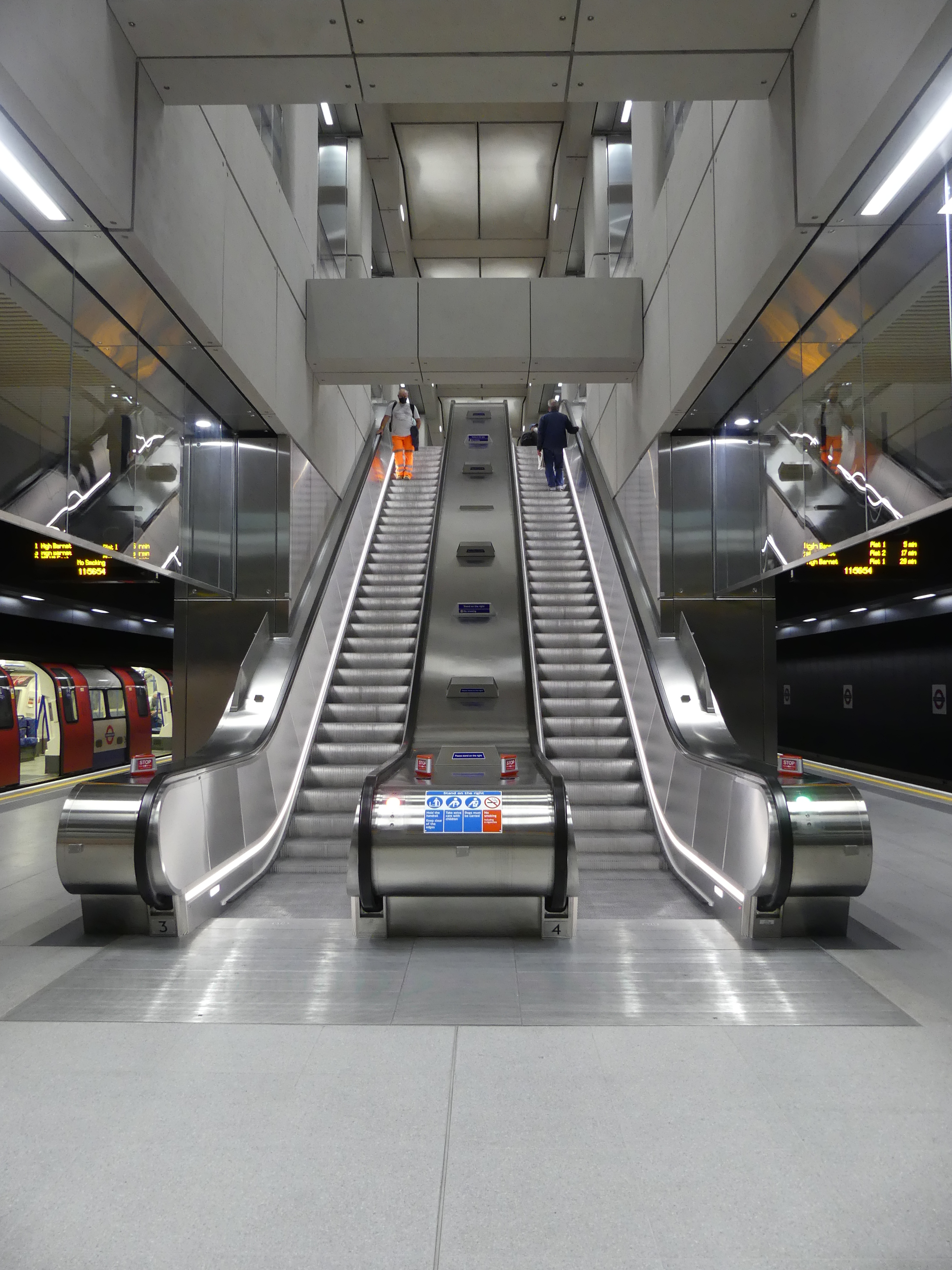
Platforms in the station

In December 2018, the Mayor of London, Sadiq Khan, announced that the project would be delayed until September 2021 at the earliest "to increase the station's capacity to cope with a higher number of passengers than originally forecast".

By June 2019, major tunnelling and track works had been completed, with an engineering train running on the extension for the first time. By February 2020, construction of the station was nearly complete, with platforms, escalators and the London Underground roundel installed. The first London Underground train ran onto the extension over the 2020 Christmas period, marking the start of the signal testing period.

=== Opening ===
The station opened on 20 September 2021, part of the first major extension of the Underground since the Jubilee Line Extension in 1999.

In September 2022, TfL announced that over 5 million trips had been made on the extension since opening, with an average of 80,000 trips a week at Battersea Power Station. Battersea Power Station noted that demand will increase further as the site reopened as an office and retail complex in October 2022. TfL estimated that demand could increase to 10 million yearly by 2024/25.

In November 2022, Battersea Power Station was awarded the Architects' Journal Architecture Award for Infrastructure and Transport, with the station canopy singled out for special praise by the judges. A western entrance to the station was opened in October 2025, located underneath a new office building. An existing subway underneath Battersea Park Road will be refurbished and connect to this new western entrance.
