= Nine Elms tube station =

London Underground station

Nine Elms
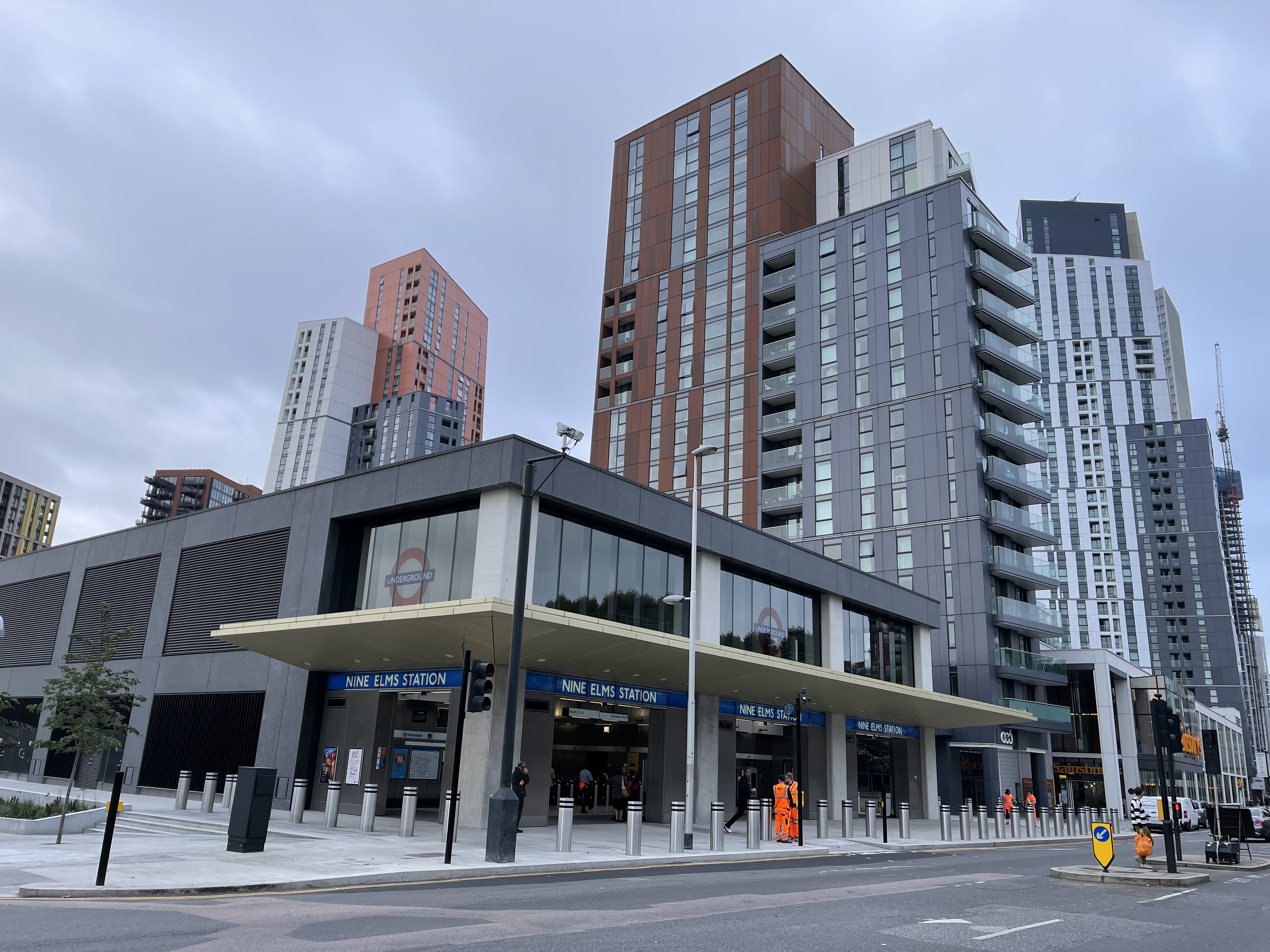
- Nine Elms station building, September 2021
- Interactive map of Nine Elms

General information
- Location: Nine Elms
- Local authority: London Borough of Lambeth
- Managed by: London Underground
- Owner: Transport for London
- Number of platforms: 2
- Accessible: Yes
- Fare zone: 1

London Underground annual entry and exit
- 2020: Not opened
- 2021: ▲1.16 million
- 2022: ▲3.47 million
- 2023: ▲4.11 million
- 2024: 4.11 million

Key dates
- 20 September 2021: Opened

Other information
- Coordinates: 51.48000°N 0.12850°W

Nine Elms is a London Underground station in Nine Elms. It opened on 20 September 2021 as part of the Northern line extension to Battersea. The station serves the rapidly growing area, New Covent Garden Market and the Embassy of the United States.

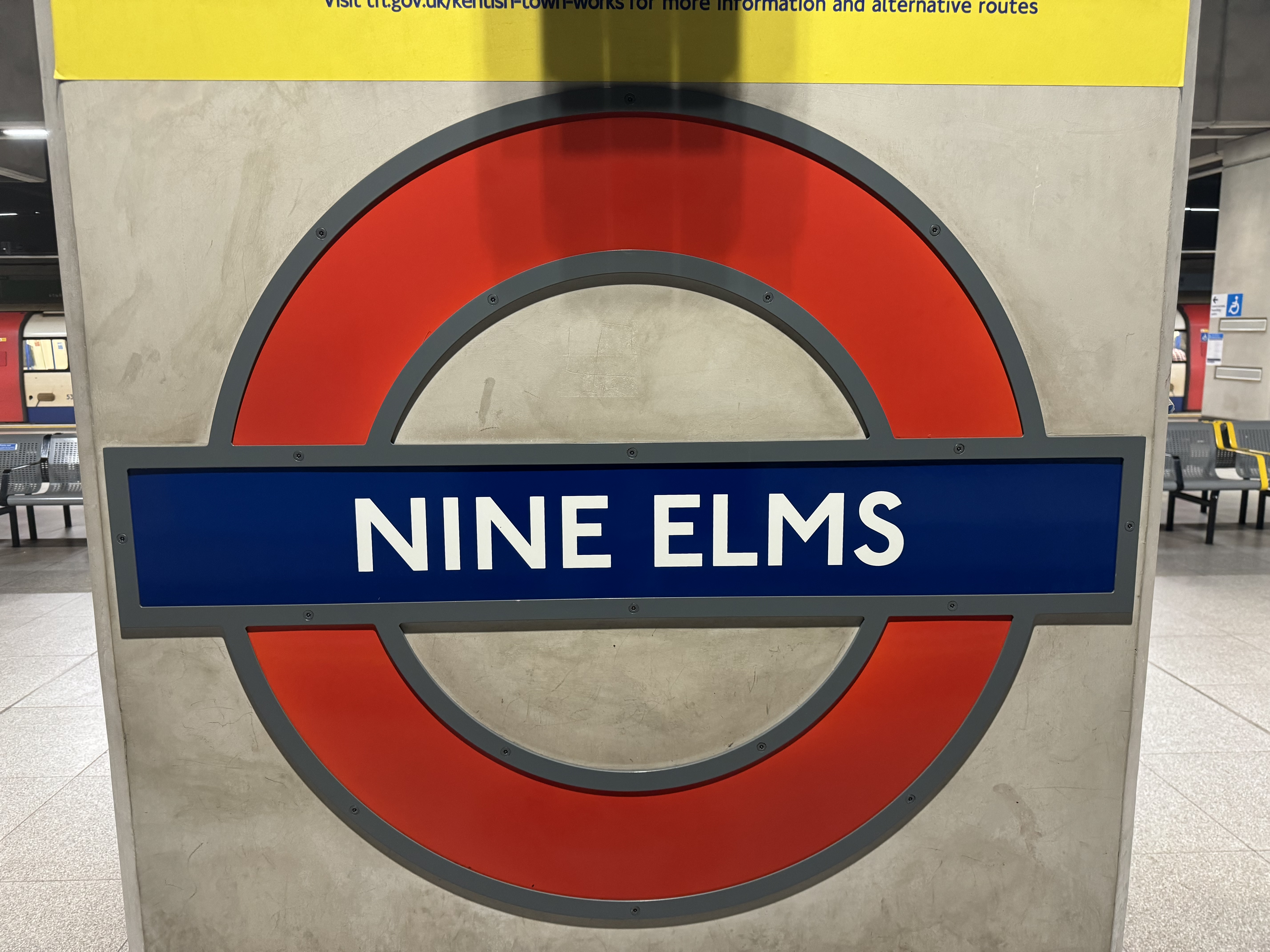
Nine Elms station roundel

It is close to the site of the former Nine Elms railway station, once the terminus of the London and South Western Railway.

== Services ==
The station is in London fare zone 1, served by the Northern line as part of the two-station extension from Kennington. The extension continues to the redevelopment of Battersea Power Station.

=== Service pattern ===
- 10tph to Battersea Power Station (12tph at peak times)
- 8tph to High Barnet via Charing Cross (10tph at peak times)
- 2tph to Mill Hill East via Charing Cross

=== Connections ===
London Buses serve the station throughout the day and night time.

== Design ==
The station entrance was designed by Grimshaw Architects, and the future over-station development will be designed by Assael Architecture. Design provisions for potential future installation of platform screen doors have been added to the station.

In September 2019, Art on the Underground announced that artist Samara Scott had been commissioned to install a permanent artwork in the station's ticket hall. Before the extension's opening in September 2021, it was confirmed that this artwork was not installed due to technical reasons. Another commission for artwork at the station will take place in the future.

In October 2023, a Labyrinth by artist Mark Wallinger was installed at the station, marking ten years of the artworks and the 160th anniversary of the London Underground.

== Space around the station ==
The future over-station development will provide over 400 new homes (40 per cent of which will be affordable), office space, retail, and a new public square serving the station. This will allow Transport for London (TfL) to recoup some of the costs of building the station and provide long-term revenue for TfL. The development will be a joint venture between property developer Grainger plc and TfL's property development company Places for London.

An archway under the Nine Elms to Waterloo Viaduct has been opened up as a pedestrian route, allowing easier north–south access through the area, as well as improving access to the Embassy Gardens and US Embassy developments.

A large Sainsbury's superstore was demolished to make way for the station. It was rebuilt and reopened in 2016. The new store is directly adjacent to the station.

== History ==
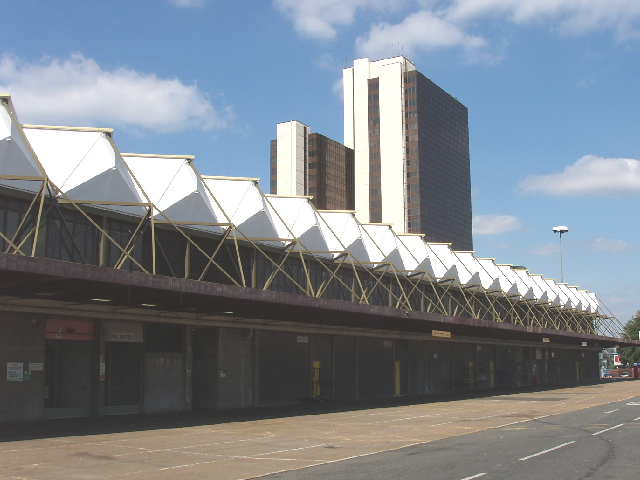
New Covent Garden - external view circa 2005 with the now demolished Market Towers in the background

=== Construction ===
The station was given the final approval by the Secretary of State for Transport in November 2014, and construction began in 2015. It was built using the cut-and-cover station box method, which ensured easy access during construction and allowed future construction of a mixed-use development on top of it.

The station was projected to open along with the rest of the extension in 2020, but in December 2018, the Mayor of London, Sadiq Khan, announced that the project's opening would be delayed for a year.

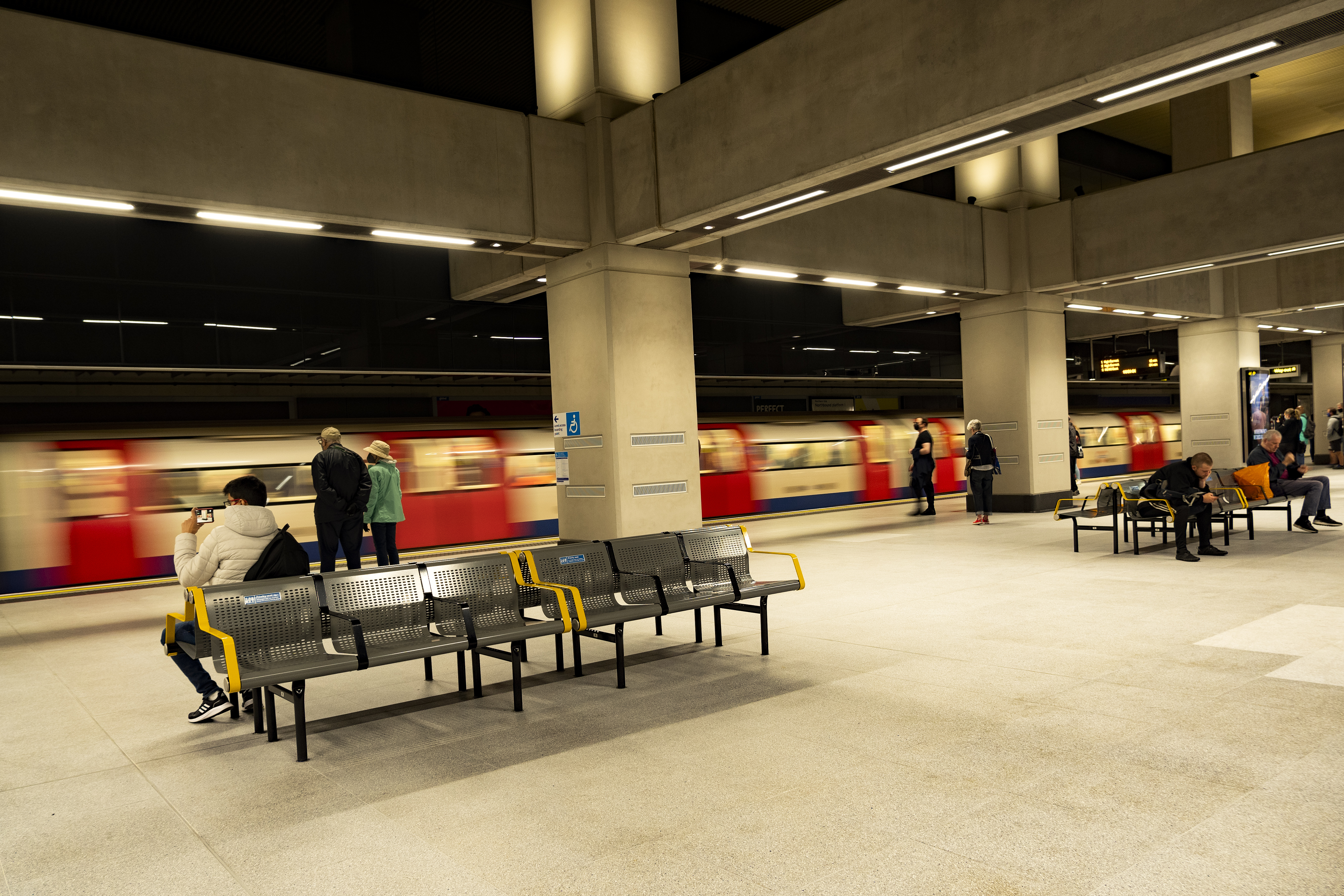
Platforms

By June 2019, major tunnelling and track works had been completed, and an engineering train ran on the extension for the first time. By February 2020, construction of the station was nearly complete, with platforms, escalators, and the London Underground roundel installed.

=== Opening ===
The station opened on 20 September 2021, part of the first major extension of the Underground since the Jubilee Line Extension in 1999.

In September 2022, TfL announced that over 5 million trips had been made on the extension since opening, with an average of 40,000 trips a week at Nine Elms, around half that of Battersea Power Station.

Preceding station	London Underground	Following station
Kennington towards Edgware, Mill Hill East or High Barnet	Northern line Battersea branch	Battersea Power Station Terminus
