= London Underground =

Rapid transit system in England

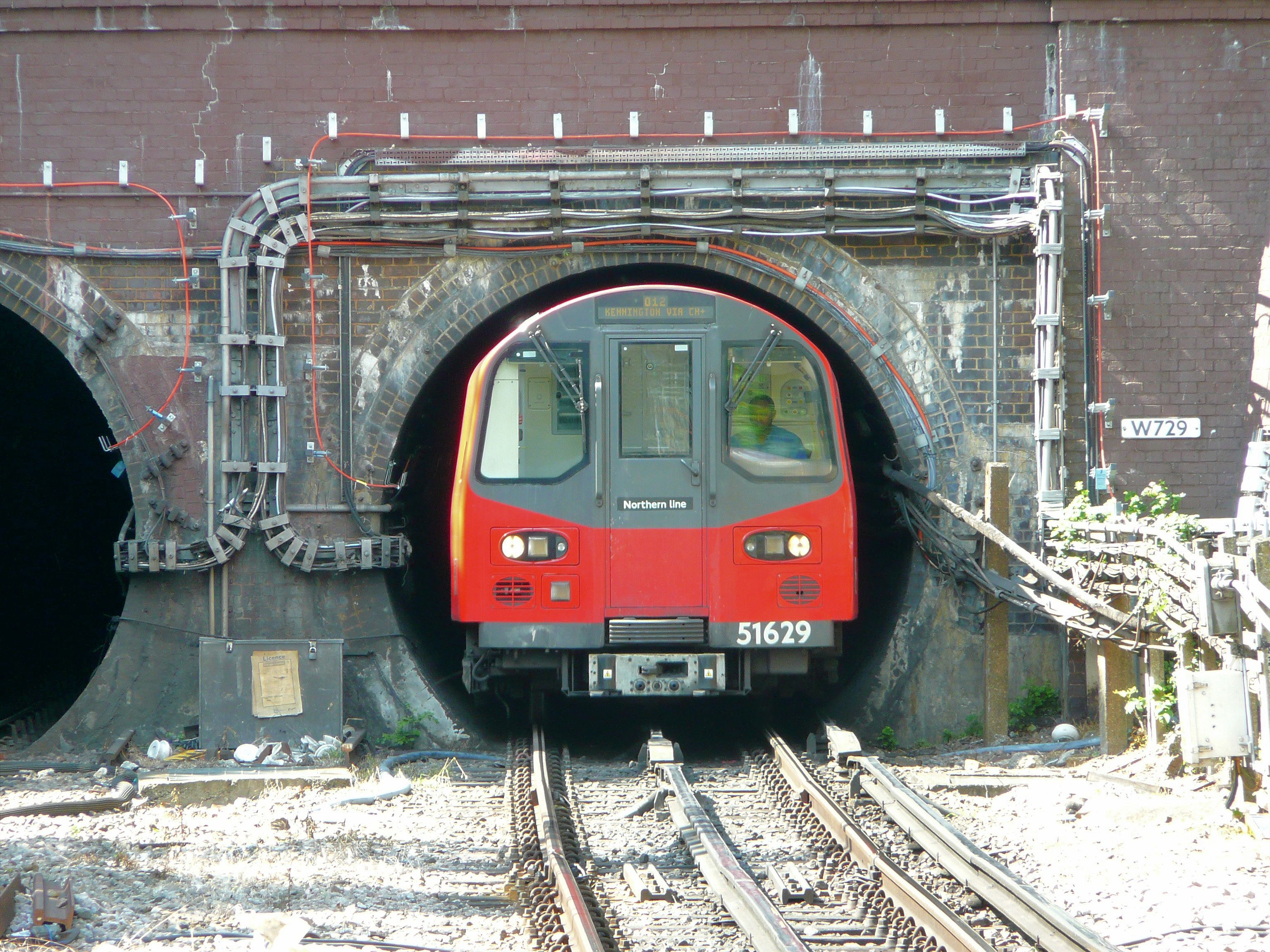
- The name "Tube" comes from the circular tube-like tunnels through which the small-profile (deep tube) trains travel. Northern line 1995 Stock train approaching Hendon Central.

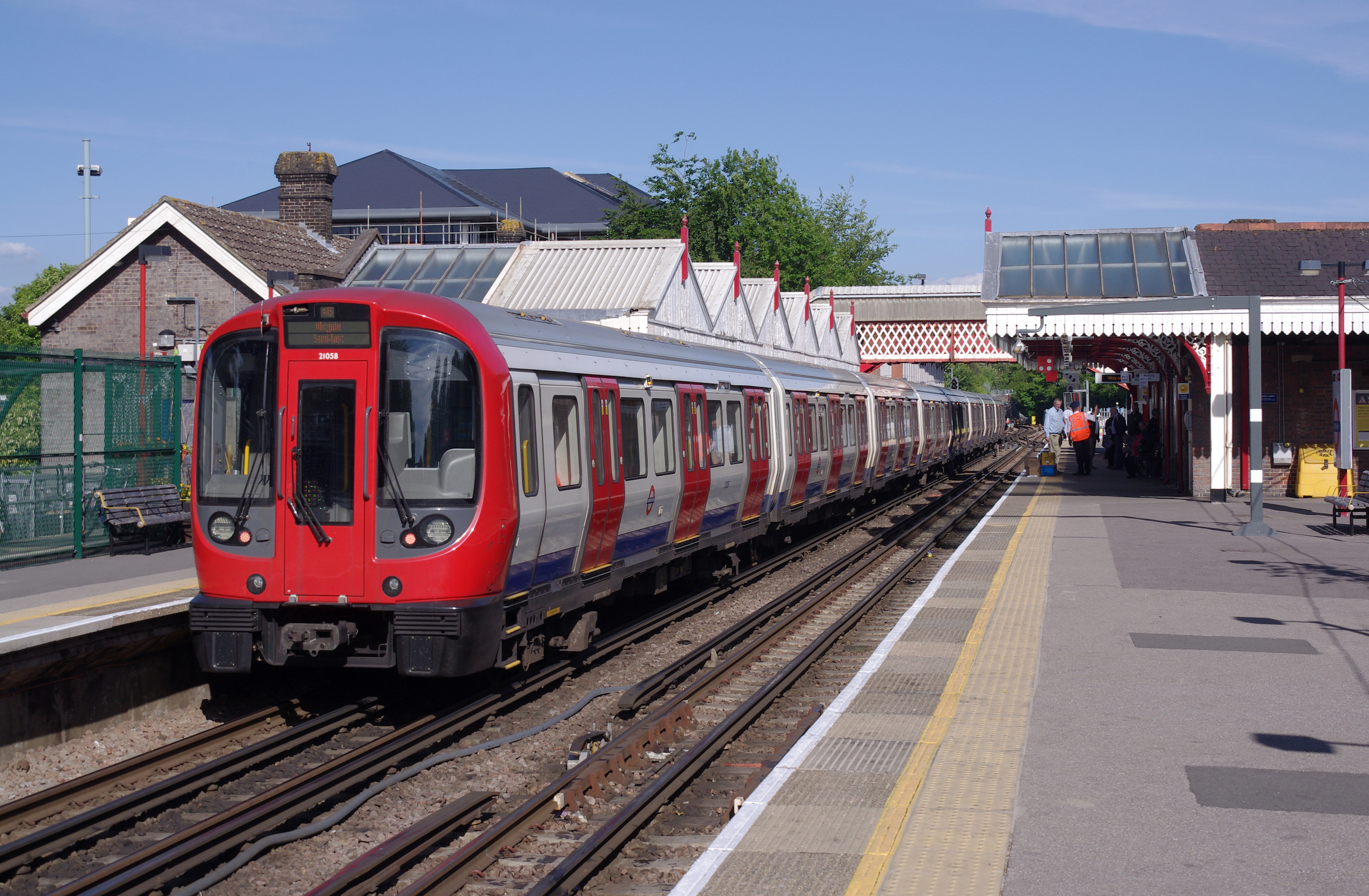
- A sub-surface Metropolitan line S8 Stock train at Amersham

Overview
- Locale: Greater London; Buckinghamshire; Essex; Hertfordshire
- Transit type: Rapid transit
- Number of lines: 11
- Number of stations: 272 served (262 owned)
- Daily ridership: 3.23 million (average for 2023/24)
- Annual ridership: 1.181 billion (2023/2024)
- Website: tfl.gov.uk/modes/tube/

Operation
- Began operation: 10 January 1863; 163 years ago
- Operator: London Underground Limited
- Reporting marks: LT (National Rail)

Technical
- System length: 402 km (250 mi)
- Track gauge: 1,435 mm (4 ft 8 1/2 in) standard gauge (1863–pres.); 7 ft (2,134 mm) Brunel gauge (1863–1869)
- Electrification: Fourth rail, 630 or 750 V DC
- Average speed: 33 km/h (21 mph)

The London Underground (also known simply as the Underground or as the Tube) is a rapid transit system serving Greater London and parts of the adjacent home counties of Buckinghamshire, Essex, and Hertfordshire in England. Managed by Transport for London (TfL), the network spans 11 lines and 250 miles (400 km) of track, serving 272 stations. While the system's nickname originates from its deep-level circular tunnels, only 45% of the network is underground, with the majority of the outer surface tracks located north of the River Thames. It is one of the busiest rapid transit networks in the world, accommodating over 1.2 billion passenger journeys annually in 2024–25.

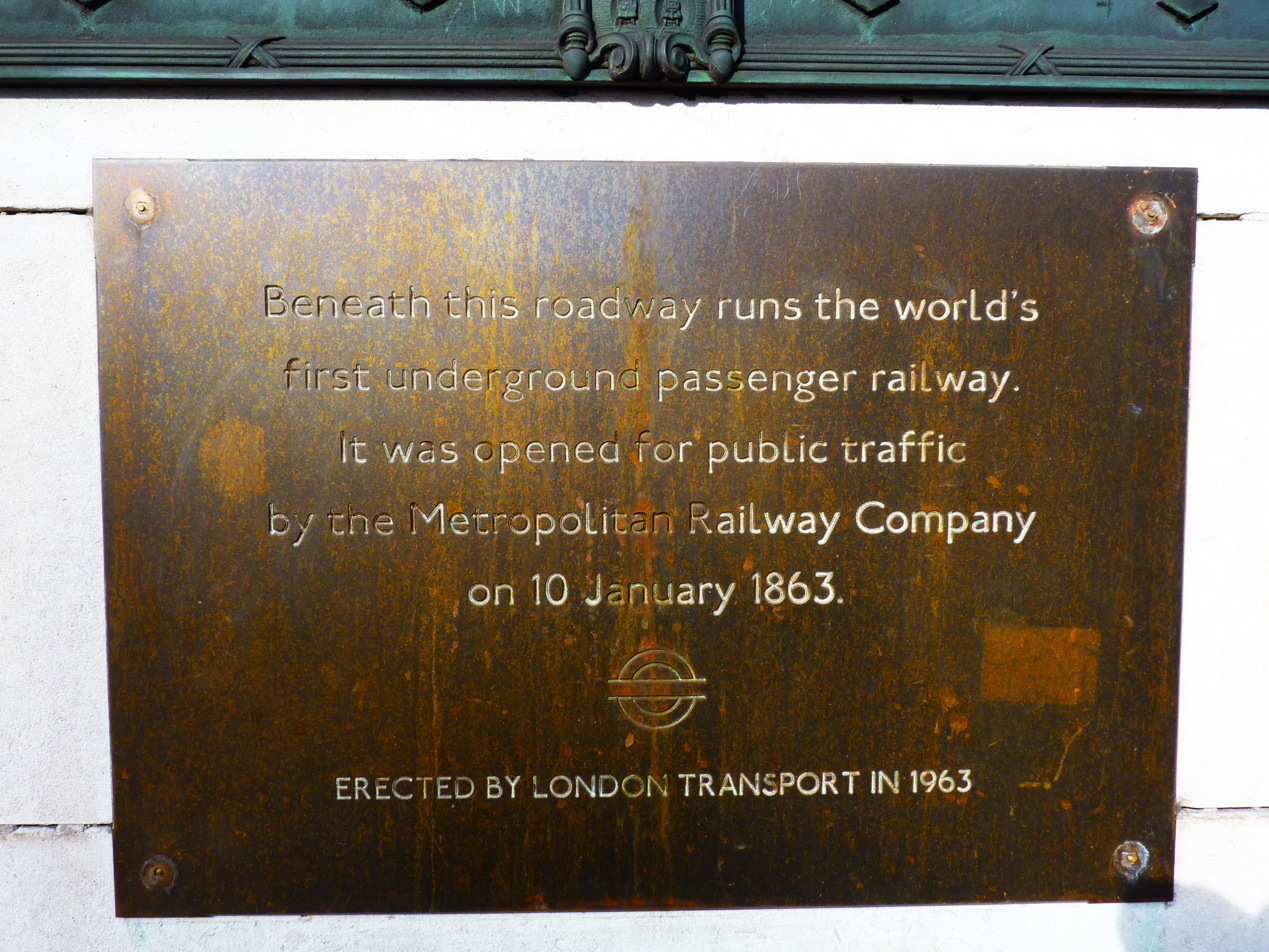
Sign on wall beside Marylebone Road beyond station entrance

The network has its origins in the Metropolitan Railway, which opened on 10 January 1863 as the world's first underground passenger railway. Early sub-surface lines used the cut-and-cover construction method, later transitioning to deeper, circular "tube" tunnels, which pioneered the use of underground electric traction with the opening of the City and South London Railway in 1890 (now part of the Northern line). Originally owned and operated by competing private companies, these distinct routes were unified under the "Underground" brand in the early 20th century and publicly consolidated in 1933 to form London Transport. The network expanded with post-war additions like the Victoria and Jubilee lines, before management was transferred in 2000 to TfL, under which the system is operated by its subsidiary, London Underground Limited.

The system is widely recognised for its influence on graphic design and corporate identity. Under the mid-20th-century leadership of the London Passenger Transport Board, the network pioneered a modernist aesthetic through its unique station architecture, iconic posters, and distinct branding assets. This design legacy includes Edward Johnston's 1916 Johnston typeface, the ubiquitous roundel logo, and Harry Beck's schematic Tube map designed in 1931, which became a global design icon and remains the framework for London's broader multi-modal transport map today.

Physically, the network is divided into sub-surface and deep-level tube lines, operated using a unique four-rail DC system. Infrastructure and operations have undergone major transformations to meet contemporary demand, including advanced signalling overhauls, the weekend Night Tube, and sweeping safety regulations implemented following the fatal King's Cross fire in 1987. Fares and ticketing have similarly evolved from the unified Travelcard (1983) and Oyster card (2003) to open-payment contactless systems introduced in 2014, a global first for a major public transport network.

== History ==
=== Early years ===
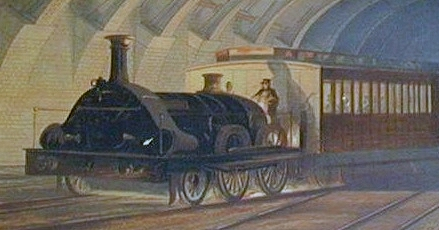
The Metropolitan Railway opened in 1863 using GWR broad-gauge locomotives.

==== Sub-surface lines ====
The idea of an underground railway linking the City of London with the urban centre was proposed in the 1830s, and the Metropolitan Railway was granted permission to build such a line in 1854. To prepare construction, a short test tunnel was built in 1855 in Kibblesworth, a small town with geological properties similar to London. This test tunnel was used for two years in the development of the first underground train, and was later, in 1861, filled up. The world's first underground railway, it opened in January 1863 between Paddington and Farringdon using gas-lit wooden carriages hauled by steam locomotives. It was hailed as a success, carrying 38,000 passengers on the opening day, and borrowing trains from other railways to supplement the service. The Metropolitan District Railway (commonly known as the District Railway) opened in December 1868 from South Kensington to Westminster as part of a plan for an underground "inner circle" connecting London's main-line stations. The Metropolitan and District railways completed the Circle line in 1884, built using the cut and cover method. Both railways expanded, the District building five branches to the west reaching Ealing, Hounslow, Uxbridge, Richmond and Wimbledon and the Metropolitan eventually extended as far as Verney Junction in Buckinghamshire – more than 50 miles (80 km) from Baker Street and the centre of London.

While steam locomotives were in use on the Underground there were many instances of passengers collapsing while travelling, owing to heat and pollution, leading for calls to clean the air through the installation of garden plants. The Metropolitan even encouraged beards for staff to act as an air filter.

==== Deep-level lines ====
For the first deep-level tube line, the City and South London Railway, two 10 feet 2 inches (3.10 m) diameter circular tunnels were dug between King William Street (close to today's Monument station) and Stockwell, under the roads to avoid the need for agreement with owners of property on the surface. This opened in 1890 with electric locomotives that hauled carriages with small opaque windows, nicknamed padded cells. The Waterloo and City Railway opened in 1898, followed by the Central London Railway in 1900, known as the "twopenny tube". These two ran electric trains in circular tunnels having diameters between 11 feet 8 inches (3.56 m) and 12 feet 2.5 inches (3.72 m), whereas the Great Northern and City Railway, which opened in 1904, was built to take main line trains from Finsbury Park to a Moorgate terminus in the City and had 16-foot (4.9 m) diameter tunnels.

==== Electrification ====
With the advent of electric Tube services (the Waterloo and City Railway and the Great Northern and City Railway), the Volks Electric Railway, in Brighton, and competition from electric trams, the pioneering Underground companies needed modernising. In the early 20th century, the District and Metropolitan railways needed to electrify and a joint committee recommended an AC system, the two companies co-operating because of the shared ownership of the inner circle. The District, needing to raise the finance necessary, found an investor in the American Charles Yerkes who favoured a DC system similar to that in use on the City & South London and Central London railways. The Metropolitan Railway protested about the change of plan, but after arbitration by the Board of Trade, the DC system was adopted.

There were reports claiming beneficial outcomes of using the Underground, including the designation of Great Portland Street as a "sanatorium for [sufferers of ...] asthma and bronchial complaints", tonsillitis could be cured with acid gas and the Twopenny Tube cured anorexia.

=== Underground Electric Railways Company era ===
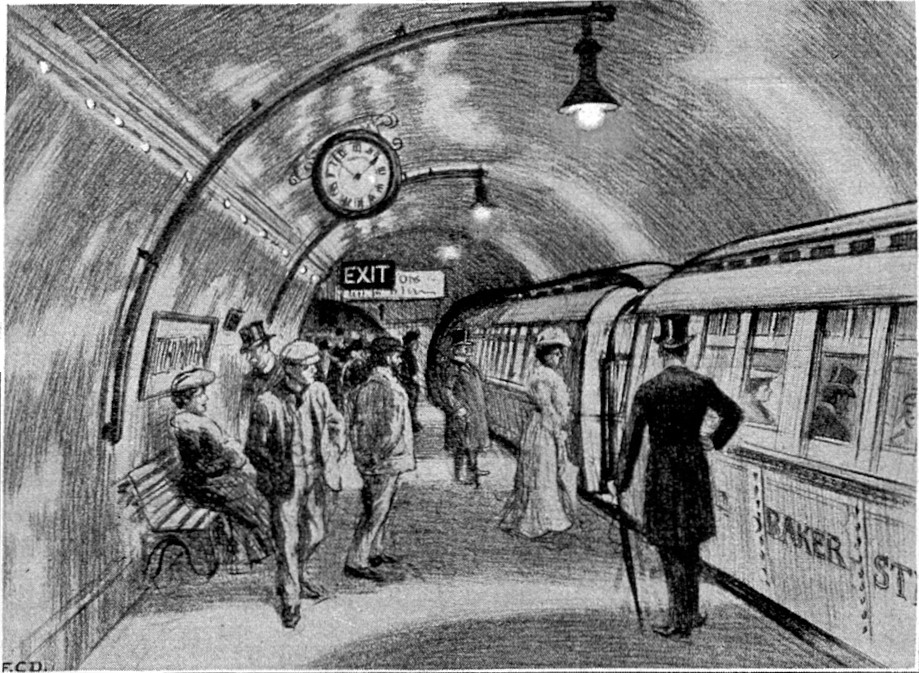
Passengers wait to board a tube train in 1906.

Yerkes soon had control of the District Railway and established the Underground Electric Railways Company of London (UERL) in 1902 to finance and operate three tube lines, the Baker Street and Waterloo Railway (Bakerloo), the Charing Cross, Euston and Hampstead Railway (Hampstead) and the Great Northern, Piccadilly and Brompton Railway, (Piccadilly), which all opened between 1906 and 1907. When the "Bakerloo" was so named in July 1906, The Railway Magazine called it an undignified "gutter title". By 1907 the District and Metropolitan Railways had electrified the underground sections of their lines.

In January 1913, the UERL acquired the Central London Railway and the City & South London Railway, as well as many of London's bus and tram operators. Only the Metropolitan Railway, along with its subsidiaries the Great Northern & City Railway and the East London Railway, and the Waterloo & City Railway, by then owned by the main line London and South Western Railway, remained outside the Underground Group's control.

A joint marketing agreement between most of the companies in the early years of the 20th century included maps, joint publicity, through ticketing and UNDERGROUND signs, incorporating the first bullseye symbol, outside stations in Central London. At the time, the term Underground was selected from three other proposed names; "Tube" and "Electric" were both officially rejected. The term Tube was later adopted alongside the Underground. The Bakerloo line was extended north to Queen's Park to join a new electric line from Euston to Watford, but the First World War delayed construction and trains reached Watford Junction in 1917. During air raids in 1915 people used the tube stations as shelters. An extension of the Central line west to Ealing was also delayed by the war and was completed in 1920. After the war, government-backed financial guarantees were used to expand the network and the tunnels of the City and South London and Hampstead railways were linked at Euston and Kennington; the combined service was not named the Northern line until later. The Metropolitan promoted housing estates near the railway with the "Metro-land" brand and nine housing estates were built near stations on the line. Electrification was extended north from Harrow to Rickmansworth, and branches opened from Rickmansworth to Watford in 1925 and from Wembley Park to Stanmore in 1932. The Piccadilly line was extended north to Cockfosters and took over District line branches to Harrow (later Uxbridge) and Hounslow.

=== London Passenger Transport Board era ===
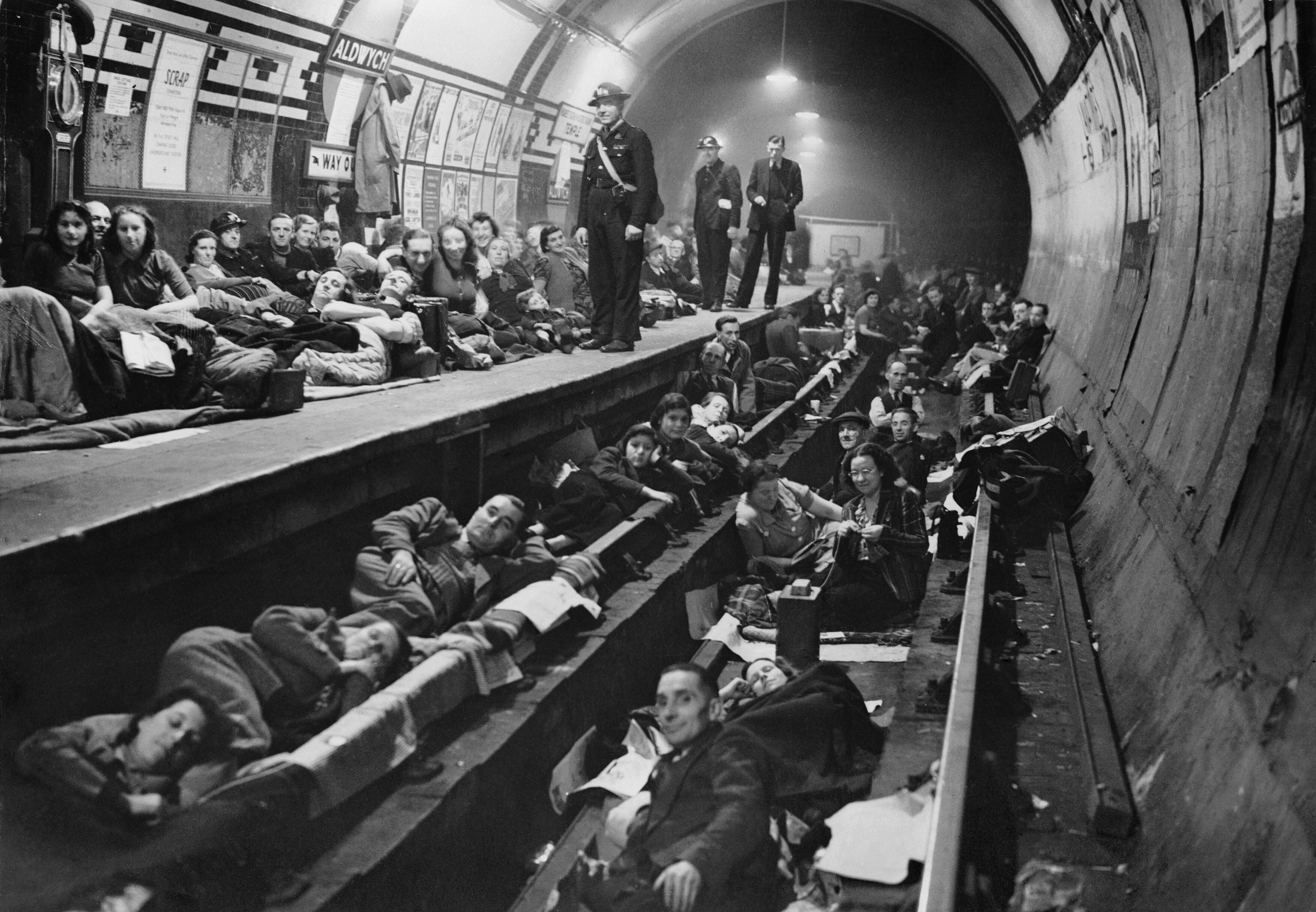
Aldwych Underground station being used as a bomb shelter in 1940

In 1933, most of London's underground railways, tramway and bus services were merged to form the London Passenger Transport Board, which used the London Transport brand. The Waterloo & City Railway, which was by then in the ownership of the main line Southern Railway, remained with its existing owners. In the same year that the London Passenger Transport Board was formed, Harry Beck's diagrammatic tube map first appeared.

In the following years, the outlying lines of the former Metropolitan Railway closed, the Brill Tramway in 1935, and the line from Quainton Road to Verney Junction in 1936. The 1935–40 New Works Programme included the extension of the Central and Northern lines and the Bakerloo line to take over the Metropolitan's Stanmore branch. The Second World War suspended these plans after the Bakerloo line had reached Stanmore and the Northern line High Barnet and Mill Hill East in 1941. Following bombing in 1940, passenger services over the West London line were suspended, leaving Olympia exhibition centre without a railway service until a District line shuttle from Earl's Court began after the war. After work restarted on the Central line extensions in east and west London, these were completed in 1949.

During the war many tube stations were used as air-raid shelters. They were not always a guarantee of safety, however; on 11 January 1941 during the London Blitz, a bomb penetrated the booking hall of Bank Station, the blast from which killed 111 people, many of whom were sleeping in passageways and on platforms. On 3 March 1943, a test of the air-raid warning sirens, together with the firing of a new type of anti-aircraft rocket, resulted in a crush of people attempting to take shelter in Bethnal Green Underground station. A total of 173 people, including 62 children, died, making this both the worst civilian disaster in Britain during the Second World War, and the largest loss of life in a single incident on the London Underground network.

=== London Transport Executive and Board era ===
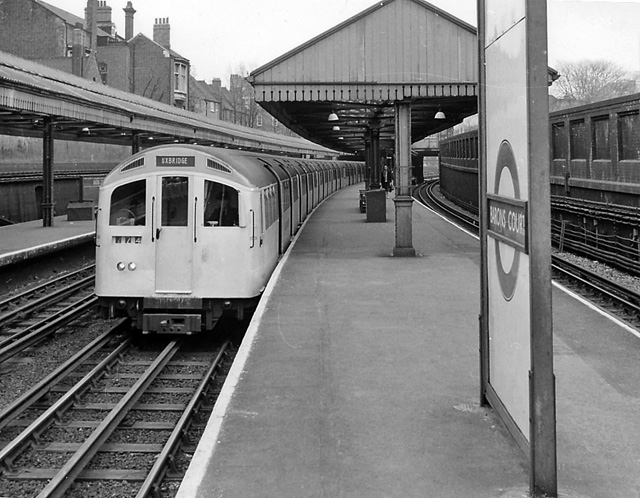
A 1959 Stock train at Barons Court

On 1 January 1948, under the provisions of the Transport Act 1947, the London Passenger Transport Board was nationalised and renamed the London Transport Executive, becoming a subsidiary transport organisation of the British Transport Commission, which was formed on the same day. Under the same act, the country's main line railways were also nationalised, and their reconstruction was given priority over the maintenance of the Underground and most of the unfinished plans of the pre-war New Works Programme were shelved or postponed.

The District line needed new trains and an unpainted aluminium train entered service in 1953, this becoming the standard for new trains. In the early 1960s, the Metropolitan line was electrified as far as Amersham, British Railways providing services for the former Metropolitan line stations between Amersham and Aylesbury. In 1962, the British Transport Commission was abolished, and the London Transport Executive was renamed the London Transport Board, reporting directly to the Minister of Transport. Also during the 1960s, the Victoria line was dug under central London and, unlike the earlier tunnels, did not follow the roads above. The line opened in 1968–71 with the trains being driven automatically and magnetically encoded tickets collected by automatic gates gave access to the platforms.

=== Greater London Council era ===
On 1 January 1970, responsibility for public transport within Greater London passed from central government to local government, in the form of the Greater London Council (GLC), and the London Transport Board was abolished. The London Transport brand continued to be used by the GLC.

On 28 February 1975, a southbound train on the Northern City Line failed to stop at its Moorgate terminus and crashed into the wall at the end of the tunnel, in the Moorgate tube crash. There were 43 deaths and 74 injuries, the greatest loss of life during peacetime on the London Underground. In 1976, the Northern City Line was taken over by British Rail and linked up with the main line railway at Finsbury Park, a transfer that had already been planned prior to the accident.

In 1979, another new tube, the Jubilee line, named in honour of the Silver Jubilee of Elizabeth II, took over the Stanmore branch from the Bakerloo line, linking it to a newly constructed line between Baker Street and Charing Cross stations. Under the control of the GLC, London Transport introduced a system of fare zones for buses and underground trains that cut the average fare in 1981. Fares increased following a legal challenge but the fare zones were retained, and in the mid-1980s the Travelcard and the Capitalcard were introduced.

=== London Regional Transport era ===
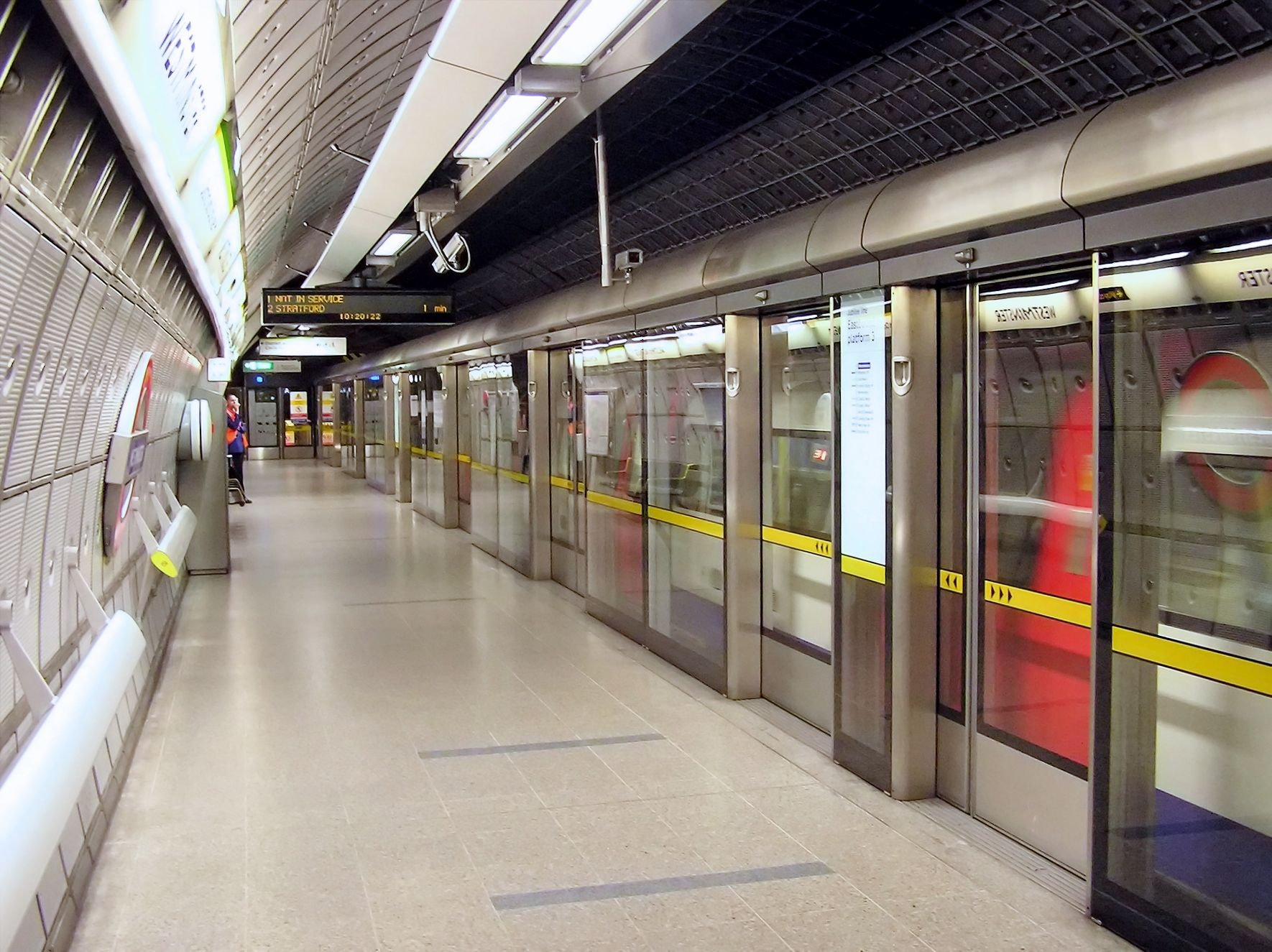
Platform edge doors at Westminster

In 1984, control of London Buses and the London Underground passed back to central government with the creation of London Regional Transport (LRT), which reported directly to the Secretary of State for Transport, still retaining the London Transport brand. One person operation had been planned in 1968, but conflict with the trade unions delayed introduction until the 1980s.

On 18 November 1987, fire broke out in an escalator at King's Cross St Pancras tube station. The resulting fire cost the lives of 31 people and injured a further 100. London Underground was strongly criticised in the aftermath for its attitude to fires underground, and publication of the report into the fire led to the resignation of senior management of both London Underground and London Regional Transport. Following the fire, substantial improvements to safety on the Tube were implemented – including the banning of smoking, removal of wooden escalators, installation of CCTV and fire detectors, as well as comprehensive radio coverage for the emergency services.

In April 1994, the Waterloo & City Railway, by then owned by British Rail and known as the Waterloo & City line, was transferred to the London Underground. In 1999, the Jubilee Line Extension project extended the Jubilee line from Green Park station through the growing Docklands to Stratford station. This resulted in the closure of the short section of tunnel between Green Park and Charing Cross stations. The 11 new stations were designed to be "future-proof", with wide passageways, large quantities of escalators and lifts, and emergency exits. The stations were the first on the Underground to have platform edge doors, and were built to have step-free access throughout. The stations have subsequently been praised as exemplary pieces of 20th-century architecture.

=== Transport for London era ===
In 2000, Transport for London (TfL) was created as an integrated body responsible for London's transport system. Part of the Greater London Authority, the TfL Board is appointed by the Mayor of London, who also sets the structure and level of public transport fares in London. The day-to-day running of the corporation is left to the Commissioner of Transport for London.

TfL eventually replaced London Regional Transport, and discontinued the use of the London Transport brand in favour of its own brand. The transfer of responsibility was staged, with transfer of control of London Underground delayed until July 2003, when London Underground Limited became an indirect subsidiary of TfL.

In the early 2000s, London Underground was reorganised in a Public-Private Partnership (PPP) as part of a project to upgrade and modernise the system. Private infrastructure companies (infracos) would upgrade and maintain the railway, and London Underground would run the train service. One infraco – Metronet – went into administration in 2007, and TfL took over the other – Tube Lines – in 2010. Despite this, substantial investment to upgrade and modernise the Tube has taken place – with new trains (such as London Underground S7 and S8 Stock), new signalling, upgraded stations (such as King's Cross St Pancras) and improved accessibility (such as at Green Park). Small changes to the Tube network occurred in the 2000s, with extensions to Heathrow Terminal 5, new station at Wood Lane and the Circle line changed from serving a closed loop around the centre of London to a spiral also serving Hammersmith in 2009.

In July 2005, four coordinated terrorist attacks took place, three of them occurring on the Tube network. It was the UK's deadliest terrorist incident since 1988.

Electronic ticketing in the form of the contactless Oyster card was first introduced in 2003, with payment using contactless banks cards introduced in September 2014. In 2019, more than 12 million Oyster cards and 35 million contactless cards were used, generating around £5 billion in ticketing revenue.

During the London 2012 Olympic and Paralympic Games, the Underground saw record passenger numbers, with more than 4.3 million people using the Tube on some days. This record was subsequently beaten in later years, with 4.82 million passengers in December 2015. In 2013, the Underground celebrated its 150th anniversary, with celebratory events such as steam trains and installation of a unique Labyrinth artwork at each station.

Under TfL, London's public transport network became more unified, with existing suburban rail lines across London upgraded and rebranded as London Overground from 2007, with the former East London line becoming part of the Overground network in 2010. Many Overground stations interchange with Underground ones, and Overground lines were added onto the Tube map.

In the 2010s, the £18.8 billion Crossrail project built a new east–west railway tunnel under central London. The project involved rebuilding and expanding several central Underground stations including Tottenham Court Road and Whitechapel. By increasing rail capacity, the line aims to reduce overcrowding on the Tube and cut cross-London journey times. The railway opened as the Elizabeth line in May 2022. Although not part of the Underground, the line connects with several Underground stations.

In 2020, passenger numbers fell significantly during the COVID-19 pandemic and 40 stations were temporarily closed. The Northern Line Extension opened in September 2021, extending the Northern line from Kennington to Battersea Power Station via Nine Elms. The extension was privately funded, with contributions from developments across the Battersea Power Station, Vauxhall and Nine Elms areas.

== Infrastructure ==
=== Railway ===
As of 2021, the Underground serves 272 stations. Sixteen stations (eight on each of the Metropolitan and Central lines) are outside the London region, with five of those beyond the M25 London Orbital motorway (Amersham, Chalfont & Latimer, Chesham, and Chorleywood on the Metropolitan line and Epping on the Central).

Of the thirty-two London boroughs, six (Bexley, Bromley, Croydon, Kingston, Lewisham and Sutton) are not served by the Underground network, while Hackney has Old Street (on the Northern line Bank branch) and Manor House (on the Piccadilly line) just inside its boundaries. Lewisham was served by the East London line (with stations at New Cross and New Cross Gate) until 2010 when the line and the stations were transferred to the London Overground network.

A geographic London Underground map showing the extent of the current network (Amersham and Chesham stations, top left, are beyond the extent of the map.)

London Underground's eleven lines total 250 miles (402 km) in length, making it the thirteenth longest metro system in the world. These are made up of the sub-surface network and the deep-tube lines.

The Circle, District, Hammersmith & City, and Metropolitan lines form the sub-surface network, with cut-and-cover railway tunnels just below the surface and of a similar size to those on British main lines. These converge on a bi-directional loop in central London, sharing tracks and stations with each other at various places along their respective routes.

The Bakerloo, Central, Jubilee, Northern, Piccadilly, Victoria and Waterloo & City lines are deep-level tubes, with smaller trains that run in circular tunnels (tubes) with a diameter of about 11 feet 8 inches (3.56 m), with one tube for each direction. The seven deep-level lines have the exclusive use of tracks and stations along their routes with the exceptions of the Piccadilly line, which shares track with the District line, between Acton Town and Hanger Lane Junction, and with the Metropolitan line, between Rayners Lane and Uxbridge; and the Bakerloo line, which shares track with London Overground's Lioness Line for its above-ground section north of Queen's Park.

Fifty-five per cent of the system runs on the surface. There are 20 miles (32 km) of sub-surface tunnels and 93 miles (150 km) of tube tunnels. Many of the central London Underground stations on deep-level tube routes are higher than the running lines to assist deceleration when arriving and acceleration when departing. Trains generally run on the left-hand track. In some places, the tunnels are above each other (for example, the Central line east of St Paul's station); or trains run on the right (for example on the Victoria line between Warren Street and King's Cross St. Pancras, to allow cross-platform interchange with the Northern line at Euston).

The lines are electrified with a fourth rail DC system: a conductor rail between the rails is energised at −210 V and a rail outside the running rails at +420 V, giving a potential difference of 630 V. On the sections of line shared with mainline trains, such as the District line from East Putney to Wimbledon and Gunnersbury to Richmond, and the Bakerloo line north of Queen's Park, the centre rail is bonded to the running rails.

The average speed on the Underground is 20.5 mph (33.0 km/h). Outside the tunnels of central London, many lines' trains tend to travel at more than 40 mph (64 km/h) in the suburban and countryside areas. The Metropolitan line can reach speeds of 62 mph (100 km/h).

=== Lines ===
The London Underground was used for 1.181 billion journeys in the year 2023–2024.

London Underground lines
Name	Map colour	Opened	Type	Length		Termini		Stations	Depots	Current rolling stock	Cars per train	Average weekday ridership (2017)	Trips per year	Average trips per mile
Name	Map colour	Opened	Type	km	mi	Termini		Stations	Depots	Current rolling stock	Cars per train	Average weekday ridership (2017)	×1000 (2016/17)	
Bakerloo line	Brown	1906	Deep tube	23.2	14.4	Harrow & Wealdstone; Queen's Park; Stonebridge Park	Waterloo; Elephant & Castle	25	Stonebridge Park; London Road; Queen's Park	1972 Stock	7	401,123	117,000	8,069
Central line	Red	1900 (Note: Known as the Central London before 1937.)	Deep tube	74.0	46.0	West Ruislip; Ealing Broadway; Northolt; White City; North Acton	Hainault; Woodford; Epping; Loughton; Leytonstone; Newbury Park	49	Ruislip; Hainault; White City	1992 Stock	8	1,021,084	288,800	6,278
Circle line	Yellow	1871 (Note: The Metropolitan and District railways joint inner circle service started in the shape of a horseshoe, a complete loop was formed in 1884 and the current spiral in 2009. The line has been referred to as the Circle line at least since 1936 and first appeared separately on the tube map in 1948.)	Sub surface	27.2	16.9	Hammersmith (via Moorgate and Ladbroke Grove)	Edgware Road (via Embankment and Notting Hill Gate)	36	Hammersmith	S7 Stock	7	257,391	73,000	4,294
District line	Green	1868	Sub surface	64.0	39.8	Ealing Broadway; Kensington (Olympia); Richmond; Wimbledon	High Street Kensington; Edgware Road; Tower Hill; Barking; Upminster	60	Upminster; Ealing Common; Lillie Bridge	S7 Stock	7	842,991	226,100	5,652
Hammersmith & City line	Pink	1864 (Note: Originally a joint Great Western and Metropolitan railways service, the line first appeared separately on the tube map in 1990.)	Sub surface	25.5	15.8	Hammersmith	Plaistow; Barking	29	Hammersmith	S7 Stock	7	231,193	61,000	3,860
Jubilee line	Grey	1979	Deep tube	36.2	22.5	Stanmore; Wembley Park; Willesden Green	North Greenwich; West Ham; Stratford	27	Neasden; Stratford Market	1996 Stock	7	999,561	280,400	12,462
Metropolitan line	Magenta	1863	Sub surface	66.7	41.4	Amersham; Chesham; Uxbridge; Watford; Rickmansworth	Harrow-on-the-Hill; Wembley Park; Baker Street; Aldgate	34	Neasden	S8 Stock	8	352,464	80,900	1,926
Northern line	Black	1890 (Note: The name dates from 1937.)	Deep tube	58.0	36.0	Edgware; High Barnet; Mill Hill East; Finchley Central; Golders Green	Kennington; Battersea Power Station; Morden	52	Edgware; Golders Green; Highgate; Morden	1995 Stock	6	1,123,342	294,000	8,166
Piccadilly line	Dark blue	1906	Deep tube	71.0	44.1	Cockfosters; Arnos Grove; Oakwood	Acton Town; Heathrow Terminals 2 & 3; Heathrow Terminal 4; Heathrow Terminal 5; Northfields; Rayners Lane; Uxbridge	53	Cockfosters; Northfields	1973 Stock	6	710,647	206,900	4,670
Victoria line	Light blue	1968	Deep tube	21.0	13.0	Brixton; Victoria	Walthamstow Central; Seven Sisters	16	Northumberland Park	2009 Stock	8	955,823	263,400	20,261
Waterloo & City line	Turquoise	1898 (Note: Until 1994 the Waterloo & City line was operated by British Rail and its predecessors.)	Deep tube	2.5	1.6	Bank	Waterloo	2	Waterloo	1992 Stock	4	59,492	16,900	11,267

=== Services using former and current main lines ===
A map of the entire system with accurate positions of stations but simplified presentation of lines. The map also shows the Docklands Light Rail and the River Thames for reference.

The Underground uses several railways and alignments that were built by main-line railway companies.

Bakerloo line
Between Queen's Park and Harrow & Wealdstone this runs over the Watford DC Line also used by London Overground, alongside the London & North Western Railway (LNWR) main line that opened in 1837. The route was laid out by the LNWR in 1912–15 and is part of the Network Rail system.
Central line
The railway from just south of Leyton to just south of Loughton was built by Eastern Counties Railway in 1856 on the same alignment in use today. The Underground also uses the line built in 1865 by the Great Eastern Railway (GER) between Loughton and Ongar via Epping. The connection to the main line south of Leyton was closed in 1970 and removed in 1972. The line from Epping to Ongar was closed in 1994; most of the line is in use today by the heritage Epping Ongar Railway. The line between Newbury Park and Woodford junction (west of Roding Valley) via Hainault was built by the GER in 1903, the connections to the main line south of Newbury Park closing in 1947 (in the Ilford direction) and 1956 (in the Seven Kings direction).
Central line
The line from just north of White City to Ealing Broadway was built in 1917 by the Great Western Railway (GWR) and passenger service introduced by the Underground in 1920. North Acton to West Ruislip was built by GWR on behalf of the Underground in 1947–8 alongside the pre-existing tracks from Old Oak Common junction towards High Wycombe and beyond, which date from 1904. As of May 2013, the original Old Oak Common junction to South Ruislip route has one main-line train a day to and from Paddington.
District line
South of Kensington (Olympia) short sections of the 1862 West London Railway (WLR) and its 1863 West London Extension Railway (WLER) were used when District extended from Earl's Court in 1872. The District had its own bay platform at Olympia built in 1958 along with track on the bed of the 1862–3 WLR/WLER northbound. The southbound WLR/WLER became the new northbound main line at that time, and a new southbound main-line track was built through the site of former goods yard. The 1872 junction closed in 1958, and a further connection to the WLR just south of Olympia closed in 1992. The branch is now segregated.
The line between Campbell Road junction (now closed), near Bromley-by-Bow, and Barking was built by the London, Tilbury & Southend Railway (LTSR) in 1858. The slow tracks were built 1903–05, when District services were extended from Bow Road (though there were no District services east of East Ham from 1905 to 1932). The slow tracks were shared with LTSR stopping and goods trains until segregated by 1962, when main-line trains stopped serving intermediate stations.
The railway from Barking to Upminster was built by LTSR in 1885 and the District extended over the route in 1902. District withdrew between 1905 and 1932, when the route was quadrupled. Main-line trains ceased serving intermediate stations in 1962, and the District line today uses only the 1932 slow tracks.
The westbound track between east of Ravenscourt Park and Turnham Green and Turnham Green to Richmond (also used by London Overground) follows the alignment of a railway built by the London & South Western Railway (LSWR) in 1869. The eastbound track between Turnham Green and east of Ravenscourt Park follows the alignment built in 1911; this was closed 1916 but was re-used when the Piccadilly line was extended in 1932. The section between Turnham Green and Richmond still belongs to Network Rail now.
The line between East Putney and Wimbledon was built by the LSWR in 1889. The last scheduled main-line service ran in 1941 but it still sees a few through Waterloo passenger services at the start and end of the daily timetable. The route is also used for scheduled ECS movements to/from Wimbledon Park depot and for Waterloo services diverted during disruptions and track closures elsewhere. This section is now owned by London Underground but the signalling is still operated by Network Rail.
Hammersmith & City
Between Paddington and Westbourne Park Underground station, the line runs alongside the main line. The Great Western main line opened in 1838, serving a temporary terminus the other side of Bishop's Road. When the current Paddington station opened in 1854, the line passed to the south of the old station. On opening in 1864, the Hammersmith & City Railway (then part of the Metropolitan Railway) ran via the main line to a junction at Westbourne Park, until 1867 when two tracks opened to the south of the main line, with a crossing near Westbourne Bridge, Paddington. The current two tracks to the north of the main line and the subway east of Westbourne Park opened in 1878. The Hammersmith & City route is now completely segregated from the main line.
Jubilee line
The rail route between Canning Town and Stratford was built by the GER in 1846, with passenger services starting in 1847. The original alignment was quadrupled "in stages between 1860 and 1892" for freight services before the extra (western) tracks were lifted as traffic declined during the 20th century, and were re-laid for Jubilee line services that started in 1999. The current Docklands Light Railway (ex-North London line) uses the original eastern alignment and the Jubilee uses the western alignment.
Northern line
The line from East Finchley to Mill Hill East was opened in 1867, and from Finchley Central to High Barnet in 1872, both by the Great Northern Railway.
Piccadilly line
The westbound track between east of Ravenscourt Park and Turnham Green was built by LSWR in 1869, and originally used for eastbound main-line and District services. The eastbound track was built in 1911; it closed in 1916 but was re-used when the Piccadilly line was extended in 1932.

=== Main line services using LU tracks ===
Chiltern Railways shares track with the Metropolitan Line between Harrow-on-the-Hill and Amersham. Three South Western Railway passenger trains a day use District Line tracks between Wimbledon and East Putney.

=== Trains ===
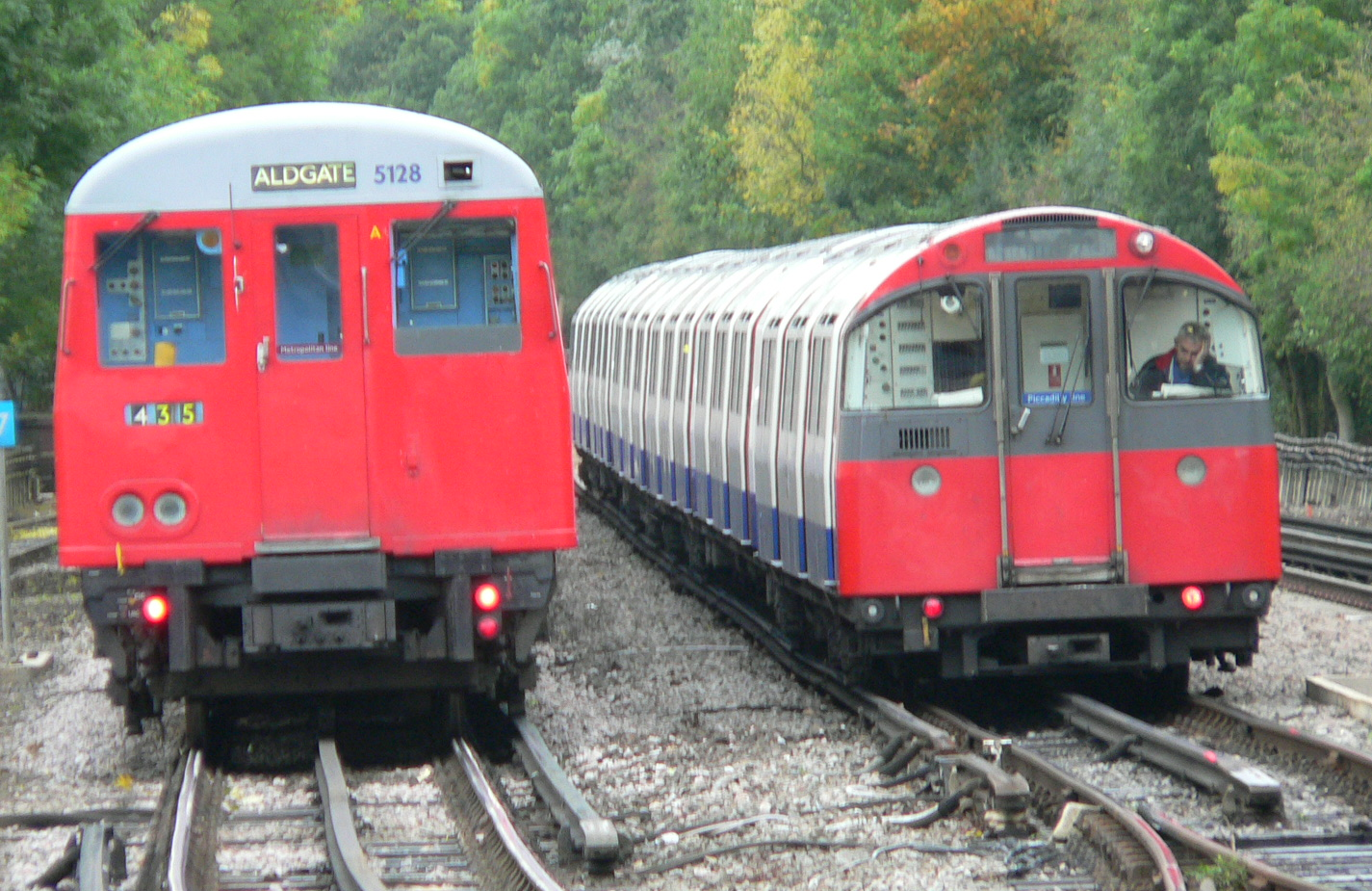
A sub-surface Metropolitan line A Stock train (left) passes a deep-tube Piccadilly line 1973 Stock train (right) in the siding at Rayners Lane.

London Underground trains come in two sizes, larger sub-surface trains and smaller deep-tube trains. Since the early 1960s all passenger trains have been electric multiple units with sliding doors and a train last ran with a guard in 2000. All lines use fixed-length trains with between six and eight cars, except for the Waterloo & City line that uses four cars. New trains are designed for maximum number of standing passengers and for speed of access to the cars and have regenerative braking and public address systems. Since 1999 all new stock has had to comply with accessibility regulations that require such things as access and room for wheelchairs, and the size and location of door controls. All underground trains were required to comply with The Rail Vehicle Accessibility (Non Interoperable Rail System) Regulations 2010 (RVAR 2010) by 2020.

Stock on sub-surface lines is identified by a letter (such as S Stock, used on the Metropolitan line), while tube stock is identified by the year of intended introduction (for example, 1996 Stock, used on the Jubilee line).

=== Depots ===
The Underground is served by the following depots:

- Bakerloo: Stonebridge Park, Queen's Park, London Road
- Central: Hainault, Ruislip, White City
- Circle: Hammersmith
- District: Ealing Common, Lillie Bridge, Upminster
- Hammersmith & City: Hammersmith
- Jubilee: Neasden, Stratford Market
- Metropolitan: Neasden
- Northern: Edgware, Golders Green, Highgate, Morden
- Piccadilly: Cockfosters, Northfields
- Victoria: Northumberland Park
- Waterloo & City: Waterloo
- London Underground: Acton Works

=== Disused and abandoned stations ===
In the years since the first parts of the London Underground opened, many stations and routes have been closed. Some stations were closed because of low passenger numbers rendering them uneconomical; some became redundant after lines were re-routed or replacements were constructed; and others are no longer served by the Underground but remain open to National Rail main line services. In some cases, such as Aldwych and Ongar, the buildings remain and are used for other purposes. In others, such as British Museum, all evidence of the station has been lost through demolition.

London Transport Museum runs guided tours of several disused stations including Down Street and Aldwych through its "Hidden London" programme. The tours look at the history of the network and feature historical details drawn from the museum's own archives and collections.

=== Proposed line extensions ===
Proposed route, safeguarded by TfL in 2021

==== Bakerloo line extension to Lewisham ====
A southern extension of the Bakerloo line from Elephant & Castle has been proposed multiple times since the line opened. In the 2010s, consultation events and preliminary design work took place on an extension. A route from Elephant & Castle to Lewisham via Old Kent Road and New Cross Gate was chosen by Transport for London in 2019. The line could be extended further on the Hayes National Rail line in future. Estimated to cost between £4.7 billion to £7.9 billion (in 2017 prices), the extension would take around 7 years to construct. Owing to financial impacts of the COVID-19 pandemic, work to implement the extension is currently on hold.

==== Other proposed extensions and lines ====
Several other extensions have been proposed in recent years, including a further extension of the Northern line's Battersea branch to Clapham Junction. The long proposed Croxley Rail Link (an extension of the Metropolitan line) was cancelled in 2018 owing to higher than expected costs and lack of funding.

In 2019, the Canary Wharf Group suggested the construction of a new rail line between Euston and Canary Wharf, to improve connections to the future High Speed 2 railway.

In 2021, Harlow District Council proposed extending the Central line from its eastern terminus in Epping to Harlow. They argued this would reduce travel times to Epping and London, and help with efforts to add 19,000 new homes to the town and expand the population to 130,000. However, no funding has been allocated for this proposed extension.

=== Line improvements ===
==== Bakerloo line ====
The thirty-six 1972-stock trains on the Bakerloo line have already exceeded their original design life of 40 years. London Underground is therefore extending their operational life by making major repairs to many of the trains to maintain reliability. The Bakerloo line will receive new trains as part of the New Tube for London project. This will replace the existing fleet with new air-cooled articulated trains and a new signalling system to allow Automatic Train Operation. The line is predicted to run a maximum of 27 trains per hour, a 25% increase on the current 21 trains per hour during peak periods.

==== Central line ====
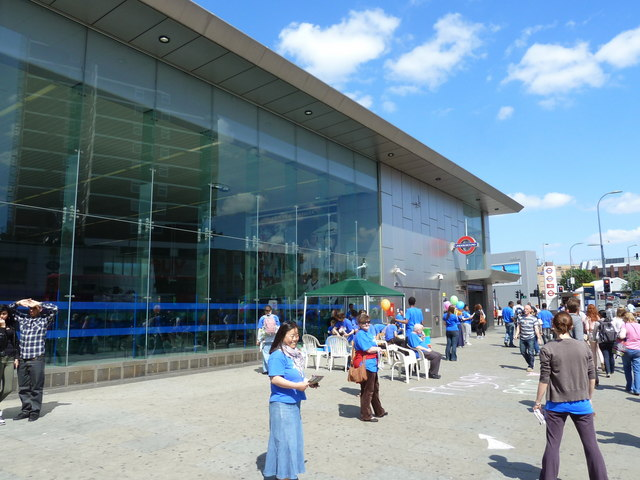
The new Shepherd's Bush station, part of a Central line improvement

The Central line was the first line to be modernised in the 1990s, with 85 new 1992-stock trains and a new automatic signalling system installed to allow Automatic Train Operation. The line runs 34 trains per hour for half an hour in the morning peak but is unable to operate more frequently because of a lack of additional trains. The 85 existing 1992-stock trains are the most unreliable on the London Underground as they are equipped with the first generation of solid-state direct-current thyristor-control traction equipment. The trains often break down, have to be withdrawn from service at short notice and at times are not available when required, leading to gaps in service at peak times. Although relatively modern and well within their design life, the trains need work in the medium term to ensure the continued reliability of the traction control equipment and maintain fleet serviceability until renewal, which is expected between 2028 and 2032. Major work is to be undertaken on the fleet to ensure their continued reliability with brakes, traction control systems, doors, automatic control systems being repaired or replaced, among other components. The Central line will be part of the New Tube for London Project. This will replace the existing fleet with new air-cooled walk-through trains and a new automatic signalling system. The line is predicted to run 36 trains per hour, a 25% increase compared to the present service of 34 trains for the busiest 30 minutes in the morning and evening peaks and 27–30 trains per hour during the rest of the peak.

==== Jubilee line ====
The signalling system on the Jubilee line has been replaced to increase capacity on the line by 20%—the line now runs 30 trains per hour at peak times, compared to the previous 24 trains per hour. As with the Victoria line, the service frequency is planned to increase to 36 trains per hour. To enable this, ventilation, power supply and control and signalling systems will be adapted and modified to allow the increase in frequency. London Underground also plans to add up to an additional 18 trains to the current fleet of 63 trains of 1996 stock.

==== Northern line ====
The signalling system on the Northern line has been replaced to increase capacity on the line by 20%, as the line now runs 24 trains per hour at peak times, compared to 20 previously. Capacity can be increased further if the operation of the Charing Cross and Bank branches is separated. To enable this up to 50 additional trains will be built in addition to the current 106 1995 stock. Five trains will be required for the Northern line extension and 45 to increase frequencies on the rest of the line. This, combined with segregation of trains at Camden Town junction, will allow 30–36 trains per hour compared to 24 trains per hour currently.

==== Piccadilly line ====
The eighty-six 1973 stock trains that operate on the Piccadilly line are some of the most reliable trains on the London Underground. The trains have exceeded their design life of around 40 years and are in need of replacement. The Piccadilly line will be part of the New Tube for London Project. This will replace the existing fleet with new air-cooled walk-through trains and a new signalling system to allow Automatic Train Operation. The line is predicted to run 30–36 trains per hour, up to a 50% increase compared to the 24–25 train per hour service provided today. The line will be the first to be upgraded as part of the New Tube for London Project, as passenger numbers have increased over recent years and are expected to increase further. This line is important in this project because it currently provides a less frequent service than other lines.

==== Victoria line ====
The signalling system on the Victoria line has been replaced to increase capacity on the line by around 25%; the line now runs up to 36 trains per hour compared to 27–28 previously. The trains have been replaced with 47 new higher-capacity 2009-stock trains. The peak frequency was increased to 36 trains per hour in 2016 after track works were completed to the layout of the points at Walthamstow Central crossover, which transfers northbound trains to the southbound line for their return journey. This resulted in a 40% increase in capacity between Seven Sisters and Walthamstow Central.

==== Waterloo & City line ====
The line was upgraded with five new 1992-stock trains in the early 1990s, at the same time as the Central line was upgraded. The line operates under traditional signalling and does not use Automatic Train Operation. The line will be part of the New Tube for London Project. This will replace the existing fleet with new air-cooled walk-through trains and a new signalling system to allow Automatic Train Operation. The line is predicted to run 30 trains per hour, an increase of up to 50% on the current 21 trains per hour. The line may also be one of the first to be upgraded, alongside the Piccadilly line, with new trains, systems and platform-edge doors to test the systems before the Central and Bakerloo lines are upgraded.

==== Sub-surface lines (District, Metropolitan, Hammersmith & City and Circle) ====
New S Stock trains have been introduced on the sub-surface (District, Metropolitan, Hammersmith & City and Circle) lines. These were all delivered by 2017. 191 trains have been introduced: 58 for the Metropolitan line and 133 for the Circle, District and Hammersmith & City lines. The track, electrical supply and signalling systems are also being upgraded in a programme to increase peak-hour capacity. The replacement of the signalling system and the introduction of Automatic Train Operation and Control is scheduled for 2019–22. A control room for the sub-surface network has been built in Hammersmith and an automatic train control (ATC) system is to replace ageing signalling equipment dating from between the mid-1920s and late 1980s, including the signal cabin at Edgware Road, the control room at Earl's Court, and the signalling centre at Baker Street. Bombardier won the contract in June 2011 but was released by agreement in December 2013, and London Underground has now issued another signalling contract, with Thales.

=== New trains for deep-level lines ===
In mid-2014, Transport for London issued a tender for up to 18 trains for the Jubilee line and up to 50 trains for the Northern line. These would be used to increase frequencies and cover the Battersea extension on the Northern line.

In early 2014, the Bakerloo, Central, Piccadilly and Waterloo & City line rolling-stock replacement project was renamed New Tube for London (NTfL) and moved from the feasibility stage to the design and specification stage. The study had shown that, with new generation trains and re-signalling:

- Piccadilly line capacity could be increased by 60% with 33 trains per hour (tph) at peak times by 2026.
- Central line capacity increased by 25% with 33 tph at peak times by 2030.
- Waterloo & City line capacity increased by 50% by 2032, after the track at Waterloo station is remodelled.
- Bakerloo line capacity could be increased by 25% with 27 tph at peak times by 2033.
- A redesign of the northern concourse and a new southern concourse at Waterloo.

The project is estimated to cost £16.42 billion (£9.86 billion at 2013 prices). A notice was published on 28 February 2014 in the Official Journal of the European Union asking for expressions of interest in building the trains. On 9 October 2014, TFL published a shortlist of those (Alstom, Siemens, Hitachi, CAF and Bombardier) who had expressed an interest in supplying 250 trains for between £1.0billion and £2.5billion, and on the same day opened an exhibition with a design by PriestmanGoode. The fully automated trains may be able to run without drivers, but the ASLEF and RMT trade unions that represent the drivers said they would "go to war" to stop driverless trains, saying it would affect safety. The invitation to tender for the trains was issued in January 2016; the specifications for the Piccadilly line infrastructure were expected in 2016, and the first train is due to run on the Piccadilly line between December 2026 and June 2027. Siemens Mobility's Inspiro design was selected in June 2018 in a £1.5billion contract.

=== Ventilation and cooling ===
When the Bakerloo line opened in 1906, it was advertised with a maximum temperature of 60 °F (16 °C), but over time the tube tunnels have warmed up. In 1938 approval was given for a ventilation improvement programme, and a refrigeration unit was installed in a lift shaft at Tottenham Court Road. Temperatures of 117 °F (47 °C) were reported in the 2006 European heat wave. It was claimed in 2002 that, if animals were being transported, temperatures on the Tube would break European Commission animal welfare laws. A 2000 study reported that air quality was 73 times worse than at street level, with a passenger inhaling the same mass of particulates during a twenty-minute journey on the Northern line as when smoking a cigarette. The main purpose of the London Underground's ventilation fans is to extract hot air from the tunnels, and fans across the network are being refurbished, although complaints of noise from local residents preclude their use at full power at night.

In June 2006 a groundwater cooling system was installed at Victoria station. In 2012, air-cooling units were installed on platforms at Green Park station using cool deep groundwater and at Oxford Circus using chiller units at the top of an adjacent building. New air-conditioned trains have been introduced on the sub-surface lines, but were initially ruled out for the tube trains owing to space being considered limited on tube trains for air-conditioning units and that these would heat the tunnels even more. The New Tube for London, which will replace the trains for the Bakerloo, Central, Waterloo and City and Piccadilly lines, is planned to have air conditioning for the new trains along with better energy conservation and regenerative braking.

In the original Tube design, trains passing through close fitting tunnels act as pistons to create air pressure gradients between stations. This pressure difference drives ventilation between platforms and the surface exits through the passenger foot network. This system depends on adequate cross-sectional area of the airspace above the passengers' heads in the foot tunnels and escalators, where laminar airflow is proportional to the fourth power of the radius, the Hagen–Poiseuille equation. It also depends on an absence of turbulence in the tunnel headspace. In many stations the ventilation system is now ineffective because of alterations that reduce tunnel diameters and increase turbulence. An example is Green Park tube station, where false ceiling panels attached to metal frames have been installed that reduce the above-head airspace diameter by more than half in many parts. This has the effect of reducing laminar airflow by 94%.

Originally, air turbulence was kept to a minimum by keeping all signage flat to the tunnel walls. Now, the ventilation space above head height is crowded with ducting, conduits, cameras, speakers and equipment acting as a baffle plates with predictable reductions in flow. Often, electronic signs have their flat surface at right angles to the main air flow, causing choked flow. Temporary sign boards that stand at the top of escalators also maximise turbulence. The alterations to the ventilation system are important, not only to heat exchange.

==== Air quality ====
The Committee on the Medical Effects of Air Pollutants (COMEAP) has reported on the relative risks of breathing air pollution in different situations. In January 2019, for example, it reported that pollution from particulates is up to 30 times higher on the London Underground than on streets in the roads above, with the Northern Line having the worst air quality.

=== Lifts and escalators ===
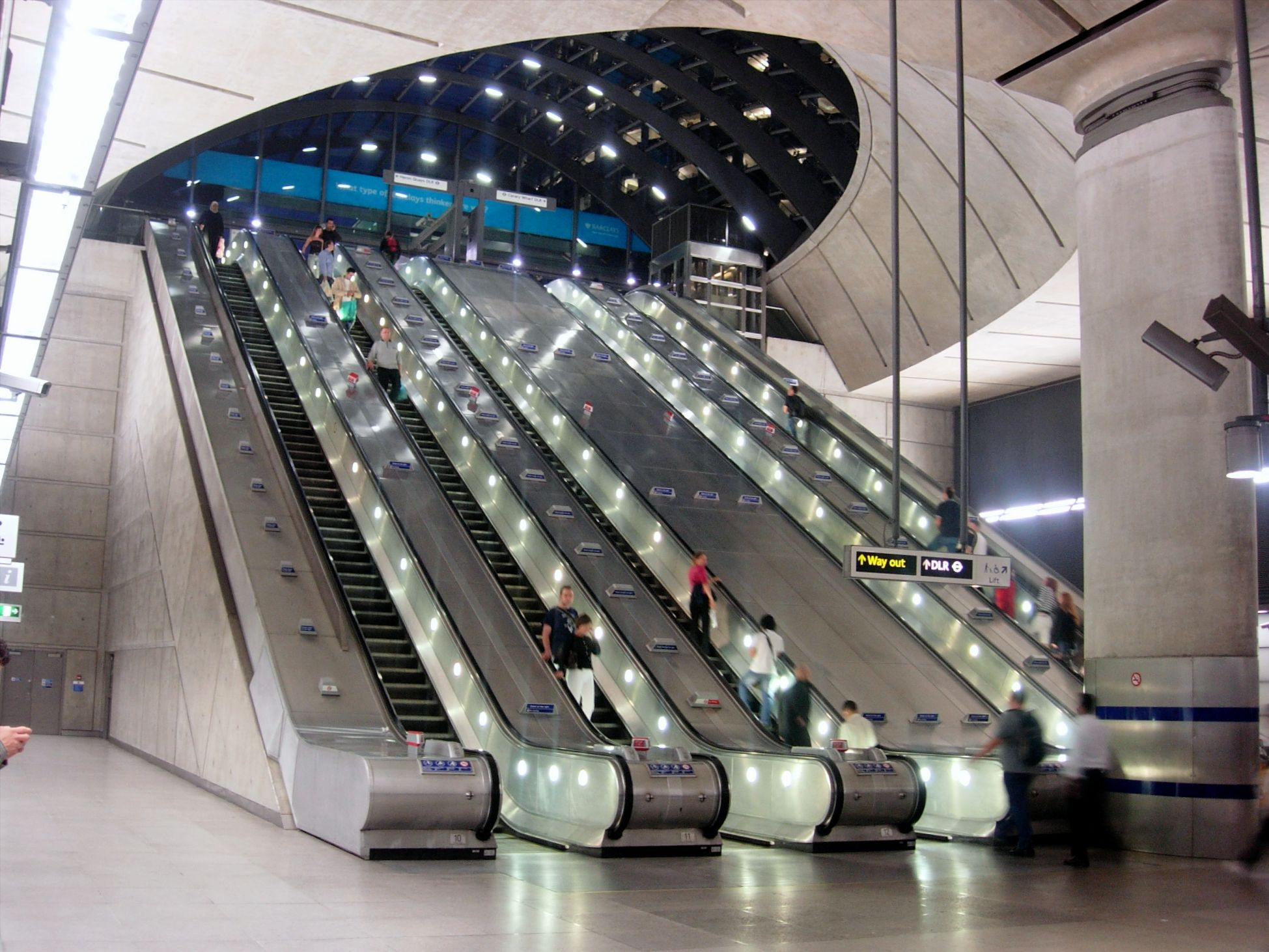
Escalators at Canary Wharf station

Originally access to the deep-tube platforms was by a lift. Each lift was staffed, and at some quiet stations in the 1920s the ticket office was moved into the lift, or it was arranged that the lift could be controlled from the ticket office. The first escalator on the London Underground was installed in 1911 between the District and Piccadilly platforms at Earl's Court and from the following year new deep-level stations were provided with escalators instead of lifts. The escalators had a diagonal shunt at the top landing. In 1921 a recorded voice instructed passengers to stand on the right and signs followed in the Second World War. Travellers were asked to stand on the right so that anyone wishing to overtake them would have a clear passage on the left side of the escalator. The first 'comb' type escalator was installed in 1924 at Clapham Common. In the 1920s and 1930s many lifts were replaced by escalators. After the fatal 1987 King's Cross fire, all wooden escalators were replaced with metal ones and the mechanisms are regularly degreased to lower the potential for fires. The only wooden escalator not to be replaced was at Greenford station, which remained until March 2014 when TfL replaced it with the first incline lift on the UK transport network in October 2015.

There are 426 escalators on the London Underground system and the longest, at 60 m (200 ft), is at Angel. The shortest, at Stratford, gives a vertical rise of 4.1 m (13 ft). There are 184 lifts, and numbers have increased in recent years because of investment in making tube stations accessible. More than 28 stations will have lifts installed over the next 10 years, bringing the total of step-free stations to more than 100. Lift and escalators are abundant with advertising posters which can be used for artistic purposes owing to the nature of their layout.

=== Wi-Fi and mobile phone reception ===
In mid-2012, London Underground, in partnership with Virgin Media, trialled Wi-Fi hotspots in many stations, but not in the tunnels, that allowed passengers free internet access. The free trial proved successful and was extended to the end of 2012, whereupon it switched to a service freely available to subscribers to Virgin Media and others, or as a paid-for service. It was not previously possible to use mobile phones on most parts of the Underground (excluding services running overground or occasionally sub-surface, depending on the phone and carrier) using native 2G, 3G or 4G networks, and a project to extend coverage before the 2012 Olympics was abandoned because of commercial and technical difficulties.

In March 2020, 2G, 3G and 4G signal was made available on parts of the Jubilee line, between Westminster and Canning Town, throughout the stations and tunnels as part of an initial trial.

In June 2021, Vodafone dropped London Underground Wi-Fi connectivity across the entire network. This was restored in April 2023 after control of the Wi-Fi connectivity moved from Virgin Media to Boldyn Networks as part of their 20-year concession deal with Transport for London, providing data connectivity across the entire network.

In December 2022, additional mobile coverage, including 5G connectivity, launched at a small subset of stations and tunnel segments on the Central line, with a view to expand to the full set of sub-surface stations and tunnels on the London Underground, and also the Elizabeth line, by the end of 2024. Further stations on the Northern line were launched from January 2023, with additional Northern line stations also being added in June 2023. Not all stations have identical coverage solutions, with some not having 5G connectivity present. As of June 2023, testing has begun on sections of the Bakerloo, Piccadilly and Victoria lines.

In November and December 2023, more mobile data coverage was launched on more stations on the Northern and Central Lines. On the Northern line: all stations from Tottenham Court Road to Euston. on the Central line: from Oxford Circus to Chancery Lane.

Mobile coverage availability on London Underground
Line	Sections of track or stations	Available from
Jubilee	Westminster – Canning Town	March 2020
Central	Holland Park – Queensway	December 2022
Central	Oxford Circus – Tottenham Court Road	September 2023
Northern	Archway – Kentish Town	January 2023
Northern	Tottenham Court Road	December 2023
Northern	Camden Town	December 2023
Northern	Kentish Town – Mornington Crescent	July 2023
Northern	Archway – East Finchley	January 2024 – Highgate platforms have service, not the tunnels. Expected from Spring 2024
Piccadilly	Russell Square – Covent Garden	Expected from Spring 2024
Northern	Euston – Belsize Park	November 2023
Central	Holland Park to Bank	February 2024
Northern	Golders Green – Hampstead	Expected from Spring 2024
Victoria	Euston – Oxford Circus	Expected from Spring 2024 (as of April 2024 there is service on all Euston platforms)

== Travelling ==
=== Ticketing ===
The Oyster card, a contactless smart card used across the London transport system

The Underground received £2.669 billion in fares in 2016/17 and uses Transport for London's zonal fare system to calculate fares. There are nine zones with zone 1 being the central zone, which includes the loop of the Circle line with a few stations to the south of River Thames. The only London Underground stations in Zones 7 to 9 are on the Metropolitan line beyond Moor Park, outside London region. Some stations are in two zones, and the cheapest fare applies. Paper tickets, the contactless Oyster cards, contactless debit or credit cards and Apple Pay and Android Pay smartphones and watches can be used for travel. Single and return tickets are available in either format, but Travelcards (season tickets) for longer than a day are available only on Oyster cards.

TfL introduced the Oyster card in 2003; this is a pre-payment smartcard with an embedded contactless RFID chip. It can be loaded with Travelcards and used on the Underground, the Overground, buses, trams, the Docklands Light Railway, and National Rail services within London. Fares for single journeys are cheaper than paper tickets, and a daily cap limits the total cost in a day to the price of a Day Travelcard. The Oyster card must be 'touched in' at the start and end of a journey, otherwise it is regarded as 'incomplete' and the maximum fare is charged. In March 2012 the cost of this in the previous year to travellers was £66.5million.

In 2014, TfL became the first public transport provider in the world to accept payment from contactless bank cards. The Underground first started accepting contactless debit and credit cards in September 2014. This was followed by the adoption of Apple Pay in 2015 and Android Pay in 2016, allowing payment using a contactless-enabled phone or smartwatch. More than 500 million journeys have taken place using contactless payments, and TfL has become one of Europe's largest contactless merchants, with around 1 in 10 contactless transactions in the UK taking place on the TfL network. This technology, developed in-house by TfL, has been licensed to other major cities like New York City and Boston.

A concessionary fare scheme is operated by London Councils for residents who are disabled or meet certain age criteria. Residents born before 1951 were eligible after their 60th birthday, whereas those born in 1955 will need to wait until they are 66. Called a "Freedom Pass", it allows free travel on TfL-operated routes at all times and is valid on some National Rail services within London at weekends and after 09:30 on Monday to Friday. Since 2010, the Freedom Pass has included an embedded holder's photograph; it lasts five years between renewals.

In addition to automatic and staffed faregates at stations, the Underground also operates on a proof-of-payment system. The system is patrolled by both uniformed and plain-clothes fare inspectors with hand-held Oyster card readers. Passengers travelling without a valid ticket must pay a penalty fare of £80 (£40 if paid within 21 days) and can be prosecuted for fare evasion under the Regulation of Railways Act 1889 and Transport for London Byelaws.

=== Hours of operation ===
All of the tube closes overnight during the week, but since 2016 (excluding 2020 and 2021 owing to the Coronavirus pandemic) parts of or all of the Central, Jubilee, Northern, Piccadilly, and Victoria lines, as well as a short section of the London Overground's Windrush line have operated all night on Friday and Saturday nights. The first trains run from about 05:00 and the last trains until just after 01:00, with later starting times on Sunday mornings. The nightly closures are used for maintenance, but some lines stay open on New Year's Eve and run for longer hours during major public events such as the 2012 London Olympics. Some lines are occasionally closed for scheduled engineering work at weekends.

The Underground runs a limited service on Christmas Eve with some lines closing early, and does not operate on Christmas Day. Since 2010 a dispute between London Underground and trade unions over holiday pay has resulted in a limited service on Boxing Day.

==== Night Tube ====
Route map of Night Tube

On 19 August 2016, London Underground launched a 24-hour service on the Victoria and Central lines with plans in place to extend this to the Piccadilly, Northern and Jubilee lines starting on Friday morning and continuing right through until Sunday evening. The Night Tube proposal was originally scheduled to start on 12 September 2015, following completion of upgrades, but in August 2015 it was announced that the start date for the Night Tube had been pushed back because of ongoing talks about contract terms between trade unions and London Underground. On 23 May 2016 it was announced that the night service would launch on 19 August 2016 for the Central and Victoria lines. The service operates on the following lines:

- Central line between Ealing Broadway and Hainault via Newbury Park or Loughton. No service on the West Ruislip Branch, between Woodford and Hainault via Grange Hill or between Loughton and Epping.
- Northern line between Morden and Edgware / High Barnet via Charing Cross. No service on Mill Hill East, Battersea or Bank branches.
- Piccadilly line between Cockfosters and Heathrow Terminals 1, 2, 3 and 5. No service to Terminal 4 or between Acton Town and Uxbridge.
- Jubilee line full line – Stratford to Stanmore.
- Victoria line full line – Walthamstow Central to Brixton.

The Jubilee, Piccadilly and Victoria lines, and the Central line between White City and Leytonstone, operate at 10-minute intervals. The Central line operates at 20-minute intervals between Leytonstone and Hainault, between Leytonstone and Loughton, and between White City and Ealing Broadway. The Northern line operates at roughly 8-minute intervals between Morden and Camden Town via Charing Cross, and at 15-minute intervals between Camden Town and Edgware and between Camden Town and High Barnet.

Night Tube services were suspended in March 2020 during the COVID-19 pandemic. They were reinstated partially in November 2021 and fully in July 2022.

=== Accessibility ===
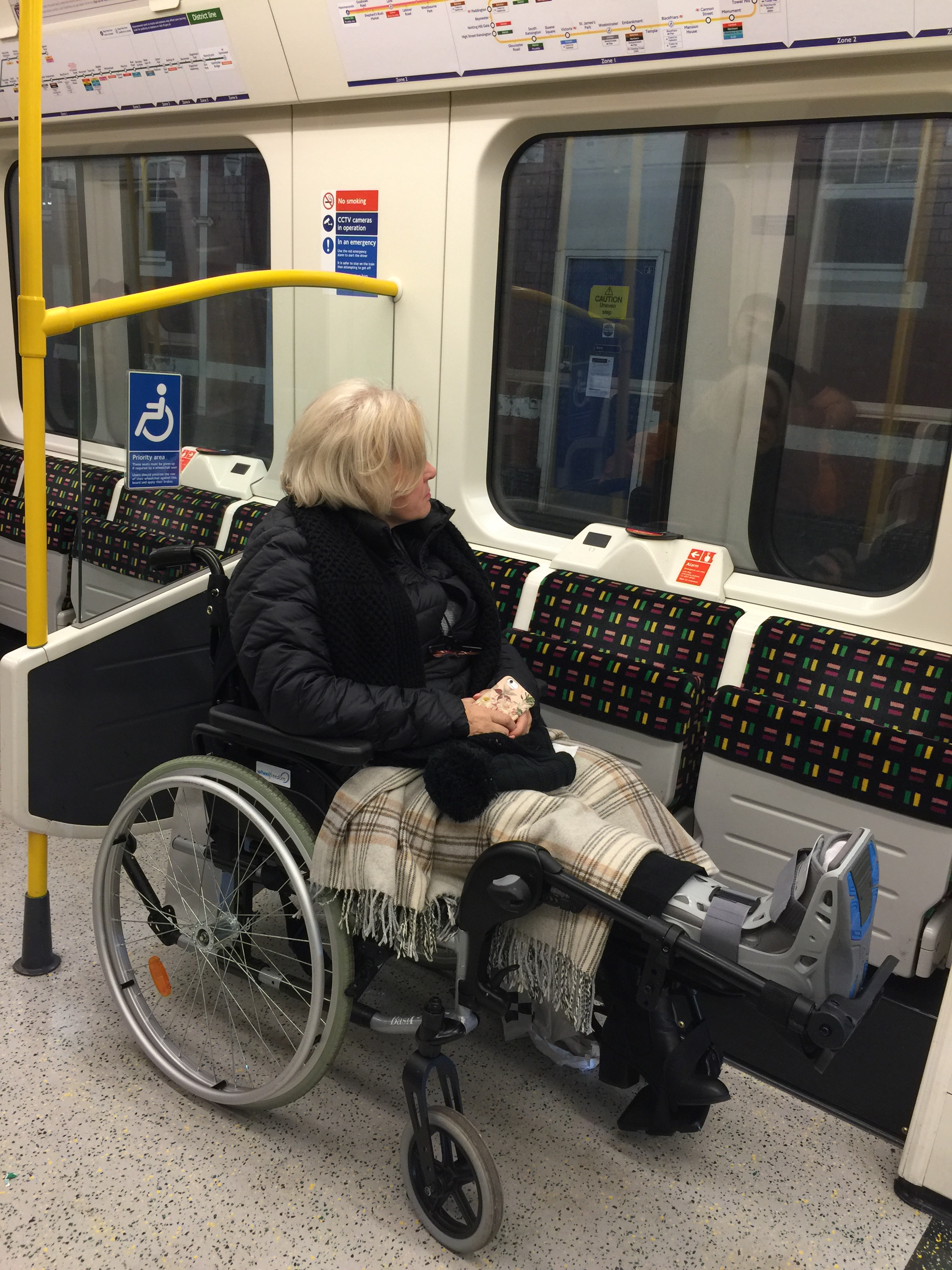
A wheelchair user on a S7 Stock Tube train

Accessibility of the public transport network allows people to travel freely at a time of their choice. Examples of disabled people that benefit from improved accessibility include people that use a wheelchair, people with limited mobility, people who are blind or visually impaired, people with impaired hearing and people with learning disabilities. Examples of other groups that benefit from improved accessibility include older people, people who have English as a second or foreign language, people with travelling with small children and people travelling with heavy luggage or shopping. As of the 2021 census, 1.2 million Londoners have a disability – a "physical or mental impairment that has a substantial and long-term negative effect on their ability to carry out normal day-to-day activities". The 2021 Census also indicated that there are 1 million people aged over 65 in London, and more than 137,000 people aged over 85.

Much of the London Underground was built before accessibility was a requirement, with wheelchair users banned from the deep-level tunnels on Underground lines until 1993. The stations on the Jubilee Line Extension, opened in 1999, were the first stations on the system designed with accessibility in mind. Since 2000, TfL has made substantial efforts to improve accessibility, with station upgrades increasing the number of step-free stations, including key interchanges such as King's Cross St Pancras, Victoria and Green Park becoming step-free.

As of December 2025, 94 Underground stations (34%) have step-free access. Step-free access is provided by using lifts, inclined lifts, level access and ramps as appropriate for each station. All stations on the network feature minor accessibility features such as tactile platform strips, audiovisual passenger information, wide ticket gates, clear signage and help points with hearing loops. Stations with large gaps between the train and the platform warn passengers with the iconic "Mind the gap" announcement.

Since 1999, all new Underground rolling stock has had to comply with accessibility regulations that require access and room for wheelchairs, and the size and location of door controls. All rolling stock has automated audio-visual station announcements. Newer rolling stock like the 2009 Stock and S Stock have a wide range of accessibility features including dedicated wheelchair spaces and priority seats for those that need them.

=== Delays and overcrowding ===
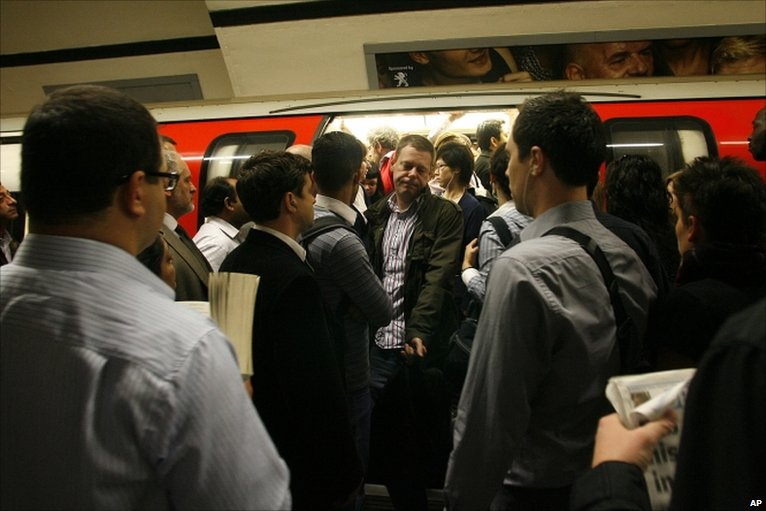
An overcrowded Northern line train. Overcrowding is a regular problem for Tube passengers, especially during peak hours.

During peak hours, stations can get so crowded that they need to be closed. Passengers may not get on the first train and the majority of passengers do not find a seat on their trains, some trains having more than four passengers every square metre. When asked, passengers report overcrowding as the aspect of the network that they are least satisfied with, and overcrowding has been linked to poor productivity and potential poor heart health. Capacity increases have been overtaken by increased demand, and peak overcrowding has increased by 16 per cent since 2004–05.

Compared with 2003–04, the reliability of the network had increased in 2010–11, with lost customer hours reduced from 54 million to 40 million. Passengers are entitled to a refund if their journey is delayed by 15 minutes or more owing to circumstances within the control of TfL, and in 2010, 330,000 passengers out of a potential 11 million Tube passengers claimed compensation for delays. Mobile phone apps and services have been developed to help passengers claim their refund more efficiently.

=== Safety ===
London Underground is authorised to operate trains by the Office of Rail and Road. As at 19 March 2013 there had been 310 days since the last major incident, when a passenger had died after falling on the track. As of 2015 there had been nine consecutive years in which no employee fatalities had occurred. A special staff training facility was opened in TFL's Ashfield House, West Kensington in 2010 at a cost of £800,000. Meanwhile, Mayor of London Boris Johnson decided it should be demolished along with the Earls Court Exhibition Centre as part of Europe's biggest regeneration scheme.

In November 2011 it was reported that 80 people had died by suicide in the previous year on the London Underground, up from 46 in 2000. Most platforms at deep tube stations have pits, often referred to as 'suicide pits', beneath the track. These were constructed in 1926 to aid drainage of water from the platforms, but also halve the likelihood of a fatality when a passenger falls or jumps in front of a train. According to the British Transport Police, hate crime on the Underground increased substantially between 2023 and 2025. Police linked elevated levels of hate crime to international events, including the Israel–Gaza conflict that began in late 2023, and the associated wave of pro-Palestinian protests in London. In a 2025 report, TfL also attributed the increased levels of hate crime to the conflict.

=== Tube Challenge ===
The Tube Challenge is the competition for the fastest time to travel to all London Underground stations, tracked by Guinness World Records since 1960. The goal is to visit all the stations on the system, but not necessarily using all the lines; participants may connect between stations on foot, or by using other forms of public transport.

As of 2021, the record for fastest completion was held by Steve Wilson (UK) and Andi James (Finland), who completed the challenge in 15 hours, 45 minutes and 38 seconds on 21 May 2015.

== Design and the arts ==
=== Map ===
The left side shows the 1933 Beck map and the right side the map in 2012.

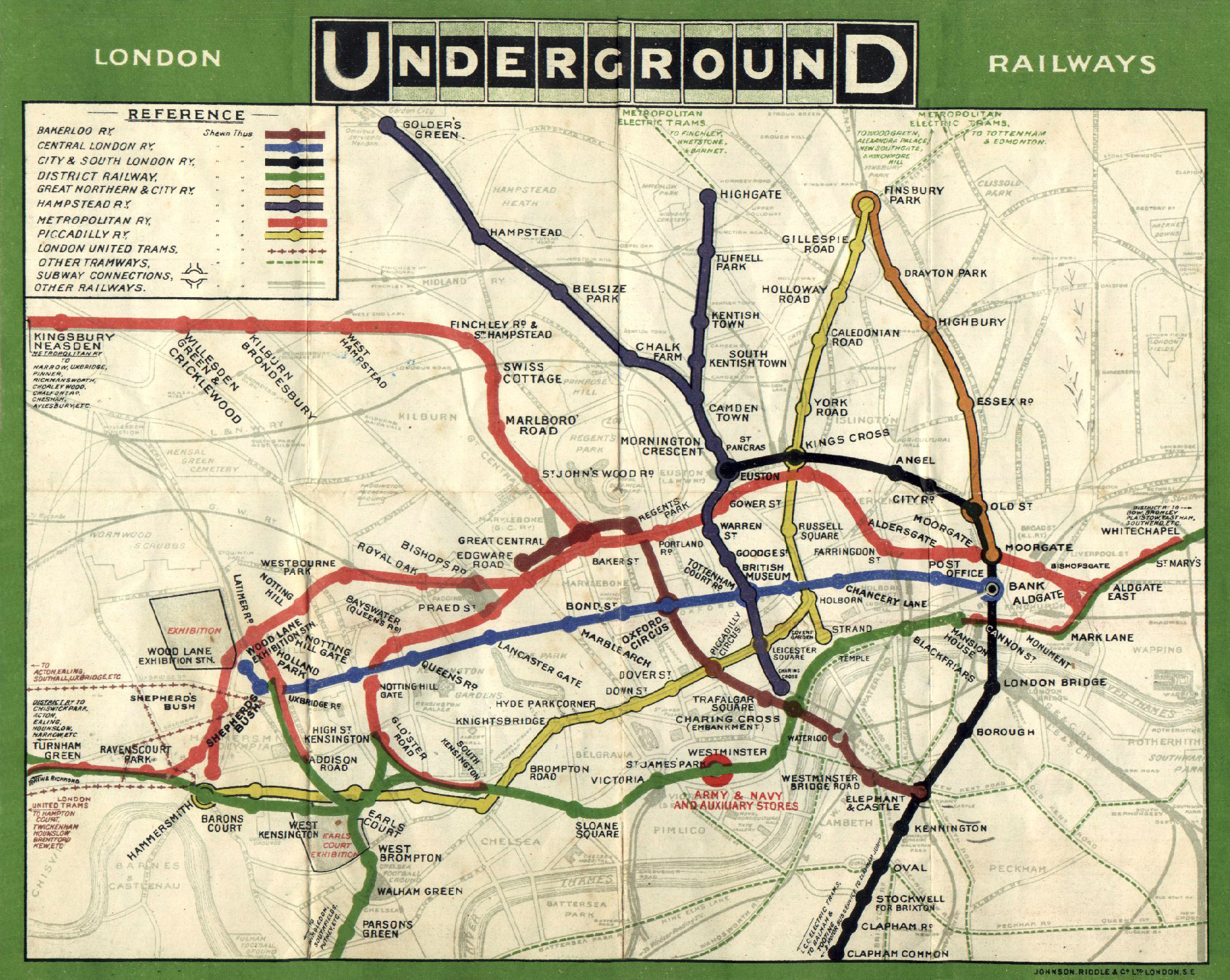
1908 map of the Underground overlaid on a city map

Early maps of the Metropolitan and District railways were city maps with the lines superimposed, and the District published a pocket map in 1897. A Central London Railway route diagram appears on a 1904 postcard and 1905 poster, similar maps appearing in District Railway cars in 1908. In the same year, following a marketing agreement between the operators, a joint central area map that included all the lines was published. A new map was published in 1921 without any background details, but the central area was squashed, requiring smaller letters and arrows. Although Fred H. Stingemore enlarged the central area of the map, it was Harry Beck who took this further by distorting geography and simplifying the map so that the railways appeared as straight lines with equally spaced stations. He presented his original draft in 1931, and after initial rejection it was first printed in 1933. Today's tube map is an evolution of that original design, and the ideas are used by many metro systems around the world.

The current standard Tube map shows the Docklands Light Railway, Thameslink, London Overground, IFS Cloud Cable Car, London Tramlink and the London Underground; a more detailed map covering a larger area, published by National Rail and Transport for London, includes suburban railway services. The tube map came second in a BBC and London Transport Museum poll asking for a favourite UK design icon of the 20th century and the underground's 150th anniversary was celebrated by a Google Doodle on the search engine.

Commissioned by Art on the Underground, the cover of the pocket map is designed by various British and international artists, one of the largest public art commissions in the UK.

=== Roundel ===
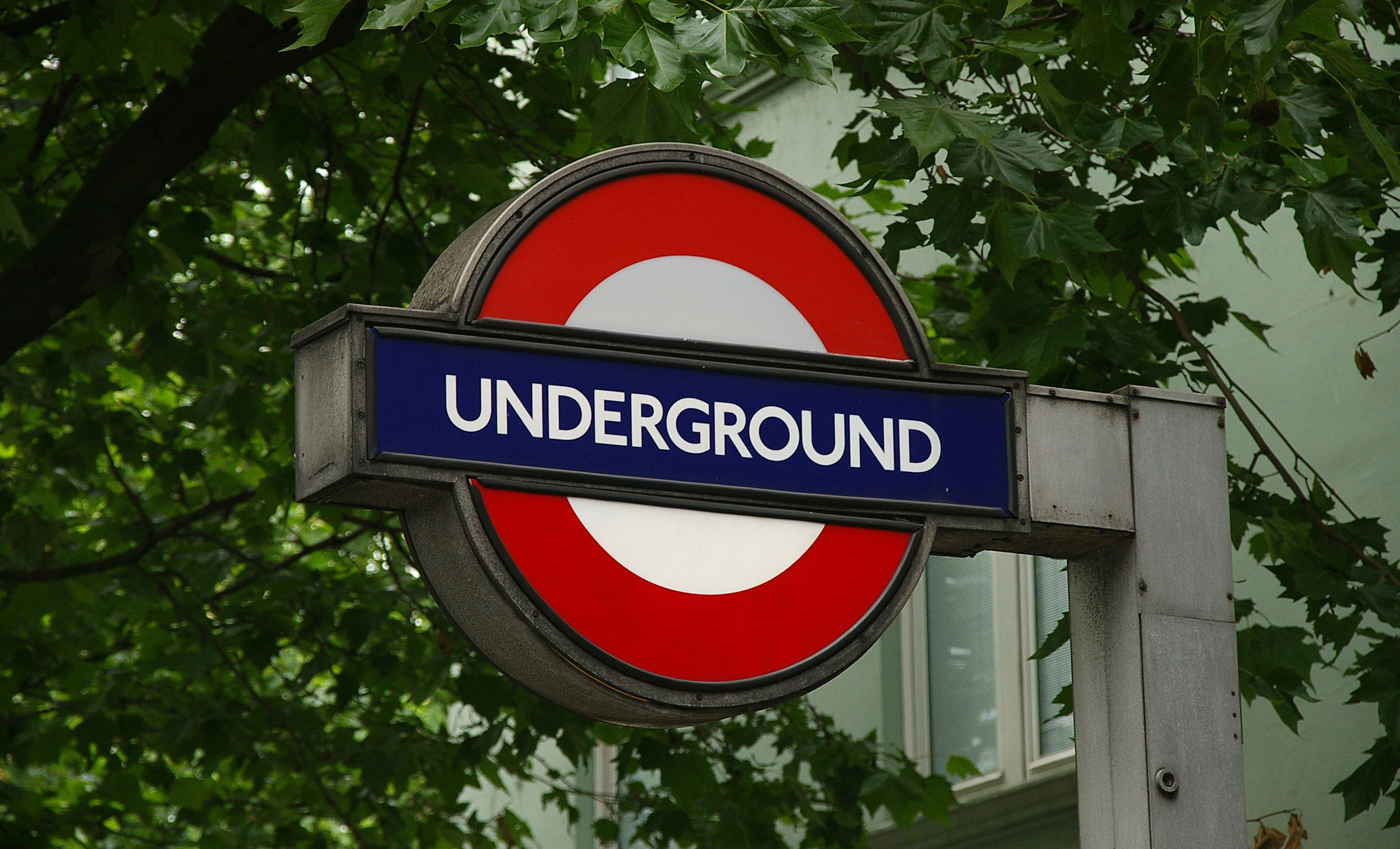
Roundel in Euston Square tube station. The ring was introduced by Frank Pick before he commissioned Edward Johnston to develop the final version of the symbol.

While the first use of a roundel in a London transport context was the trademark of the London General Omnibus Company registered in 1905, it was first used on the Underground in 1908 when the Underground Electric Railways Company of London (UERL) placed a solid red circle behind station nameboards on platforms to highlight the name. The word "UNDERGROUND" was placed in a roundel instead of a station name on posters in 1912 by Charles Sharland and Alfred France, as well as on undated and possibly earlier posters from the same period.

Transport administrator Frank Pick, wanting to establish a strong corporate identity and visual brand for the Underground, thought the solid red disc cumbersome and took a version where the disc became a ring from a 1915 Sharland poster and gave it to Edward Johnston to develop, and registered the symbol as a trademark in 1917. The roundel was first printed on a map cover using the Johnston typeface in June 1919, and printed in colour the following October.

After the UERL was absorbed into the London Passenger Transport Board in 1933, it used forms of the roundel for buses, trams and coaches, as well as the Underground. The words "London Transport" were added inside the ring, above and below the bar. The Carr-Edwards report, published in 1938 as possibly the first attempt at a graphics standards manual, introduced stricter guidelines. Between 1948 and 1957 the word "Underground" in the bar was replaced by "London Transport". As of 2013, forms of the roundel, with differing colours for the ring and bar, are used for other TfL services, such as London Buses, Tramlink, London Overground, London River Services and Docklands Light Railway. The Elizabeth line is identified with a purple roundel. The 100th anniversary of the roundel was celebrated in 2008 by TfL commissioning 100 artists to produce works that celebrate the design. Roundels are featured outside many underground stations; they are commonly mounted on a white pole known as a "Venetian mast".

In 2016, Tate Modern commissioned conceptual artist Michael Craig-Martin to "reimagine" the roundel, changing its colours for the first time since the sign was introduced. His design was displayed at Southwark Station in collaboration with Art on the Underground to mark the opening weekend of the new Tate Modern gallery situated near the station.

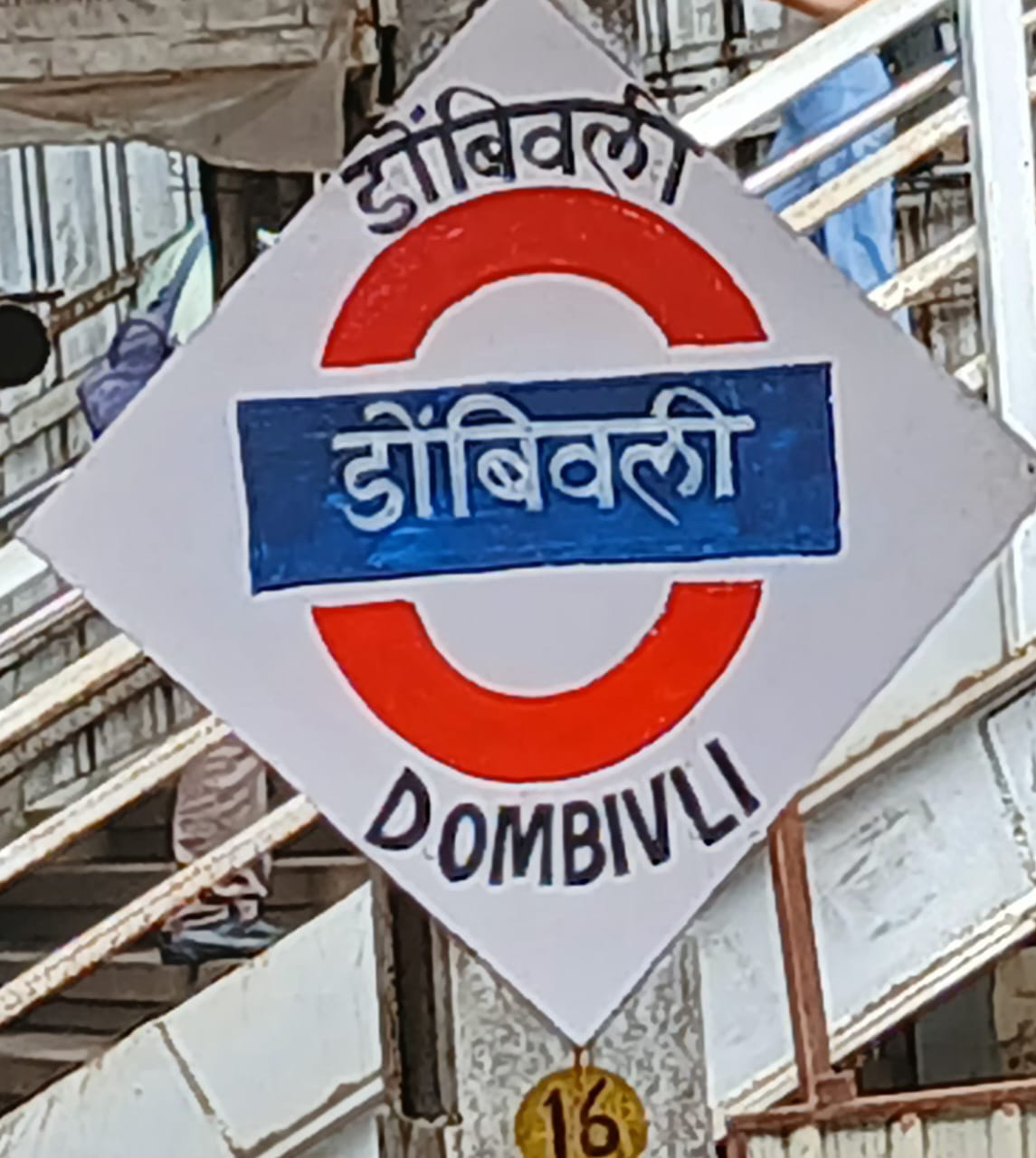
London Underground-style roundels are also used by railway stations in India, especially the stations in the Mumbai Suburban Railway Network

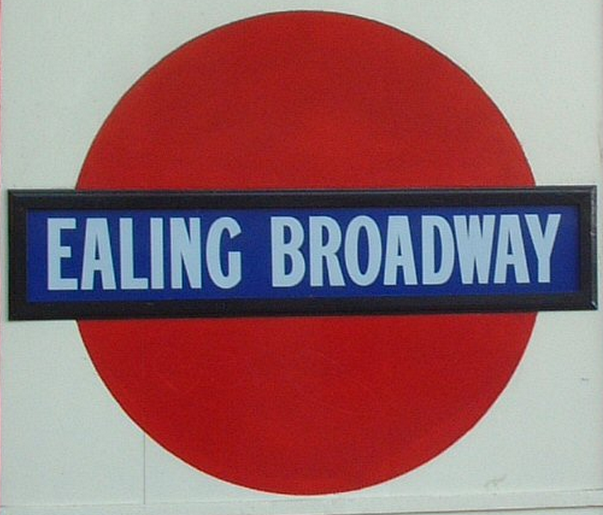
An early form of the roundel as used on the platform at Ealing Broadway

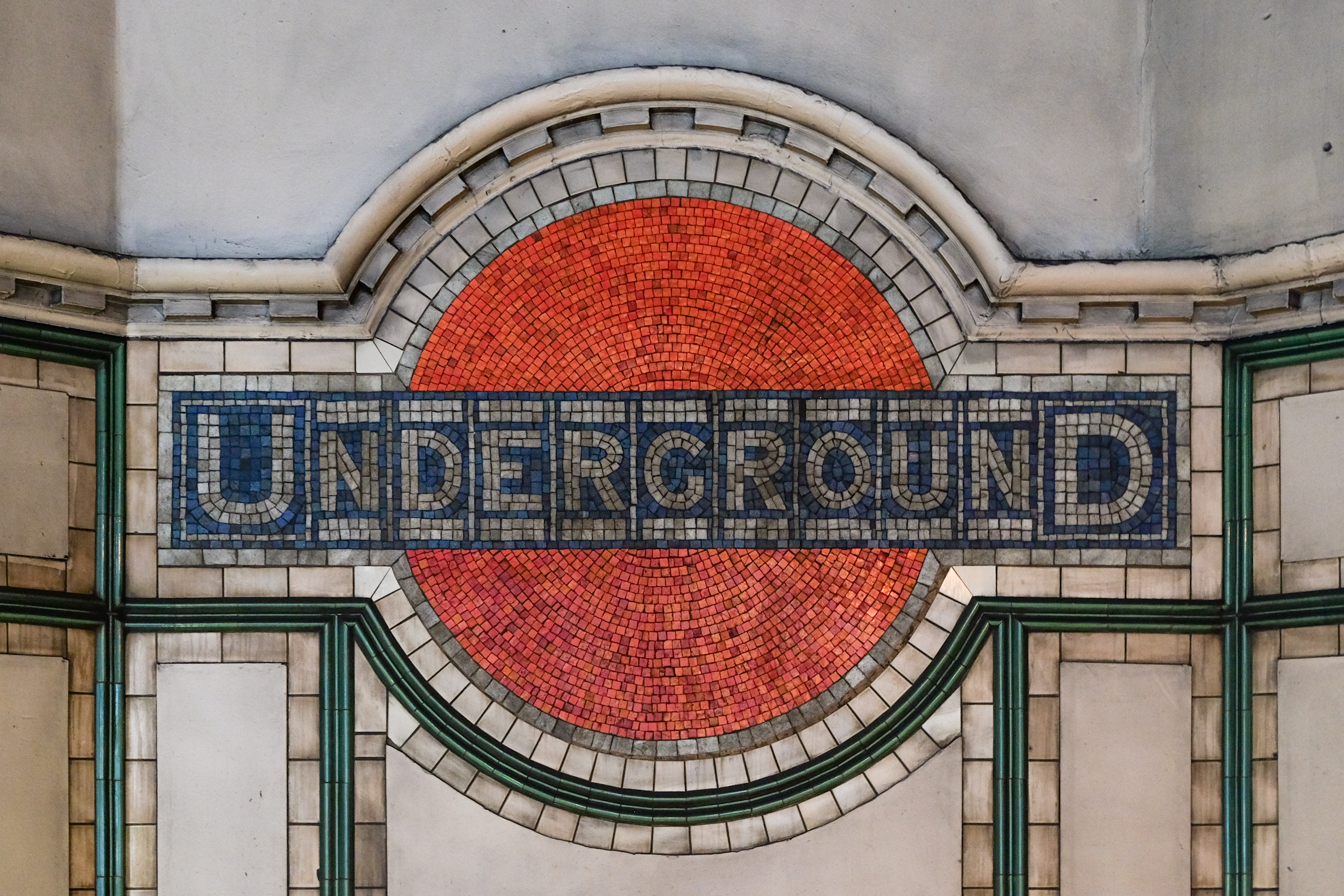
Mosaic roundel used at Maida Vale station

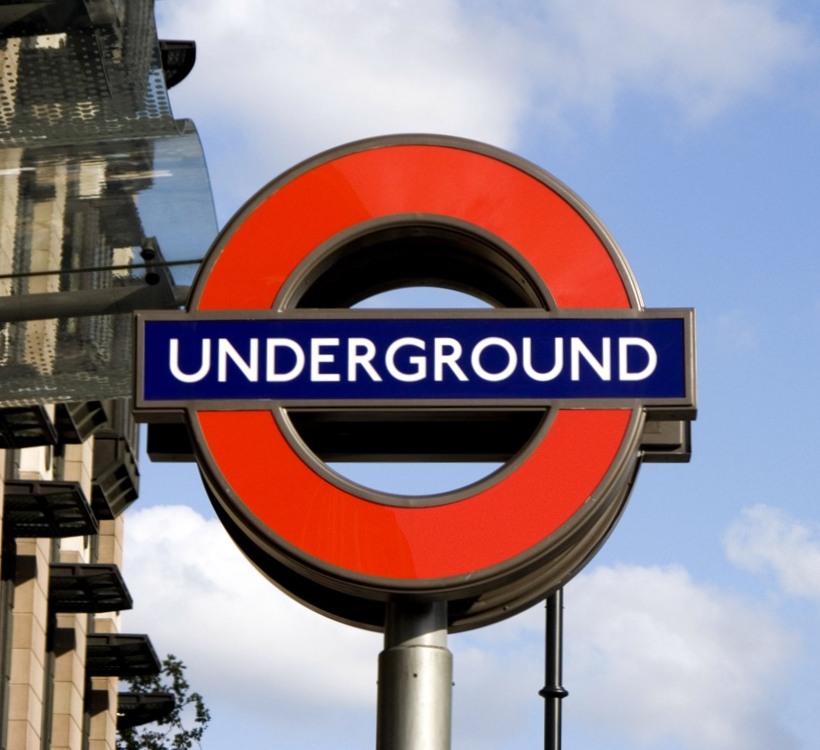
The form used today outside Westminster tube station

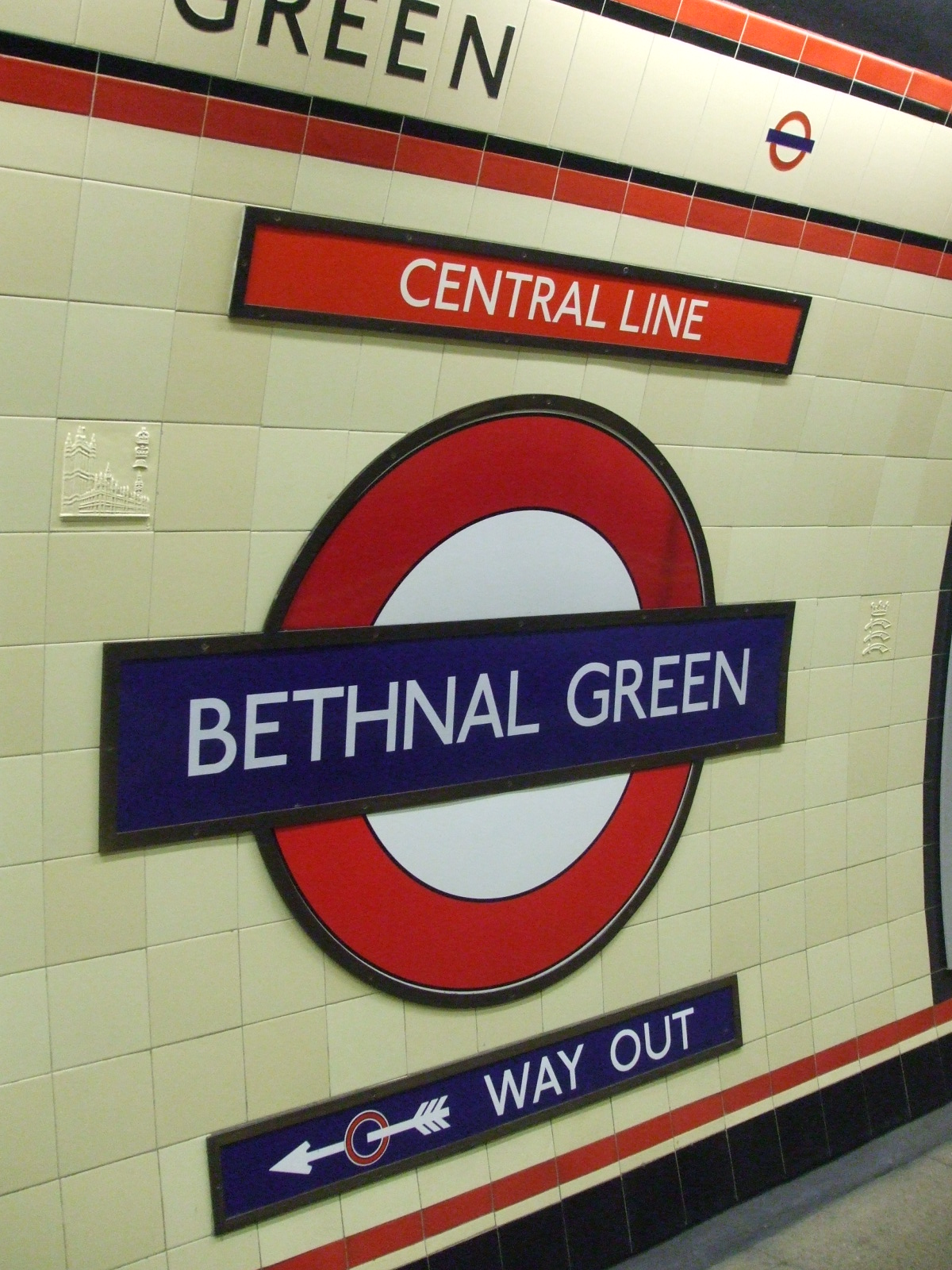
Roundel and "way out" arrow on a platform at Bethnal Green station

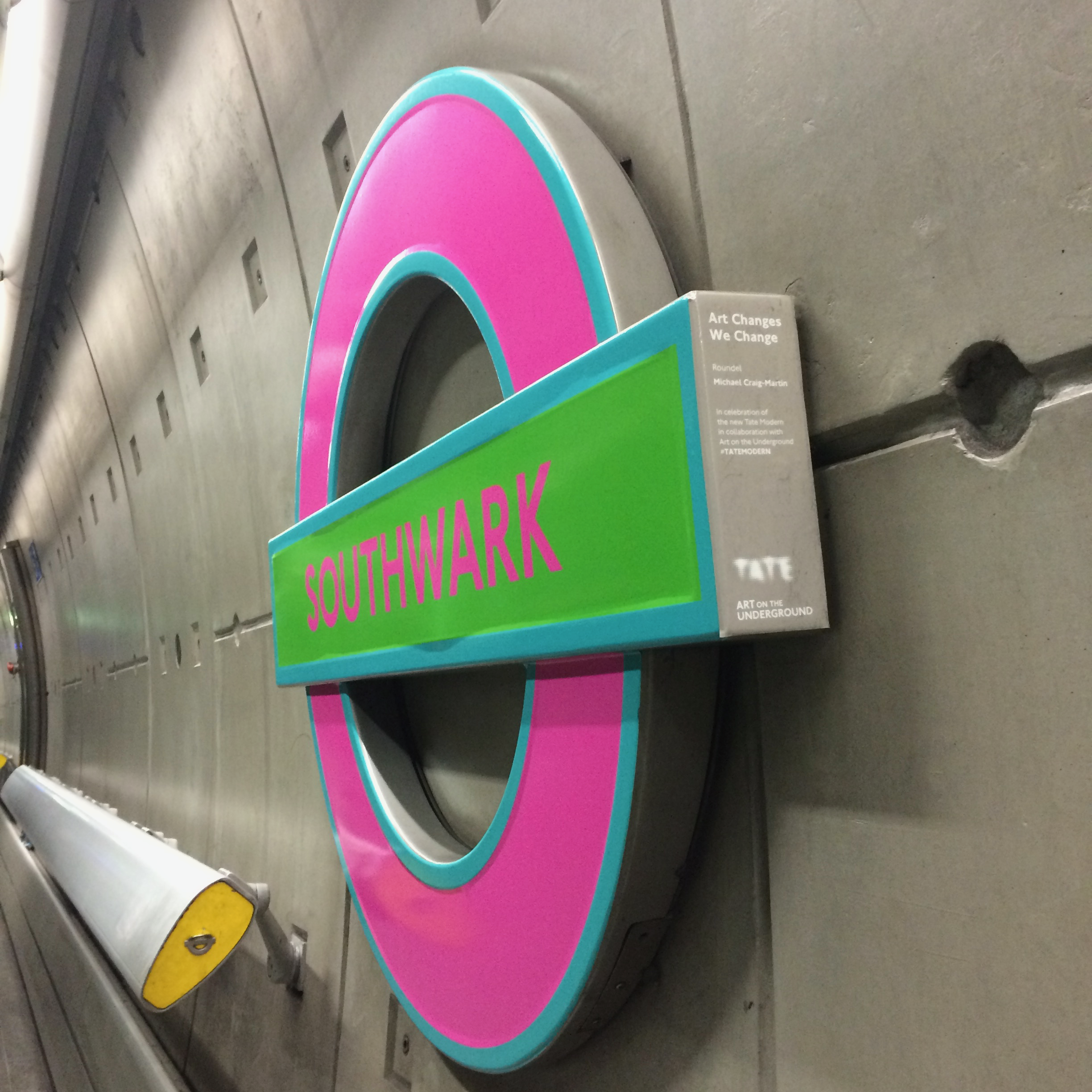
Michael Craig-Martin's 2016 roundel design

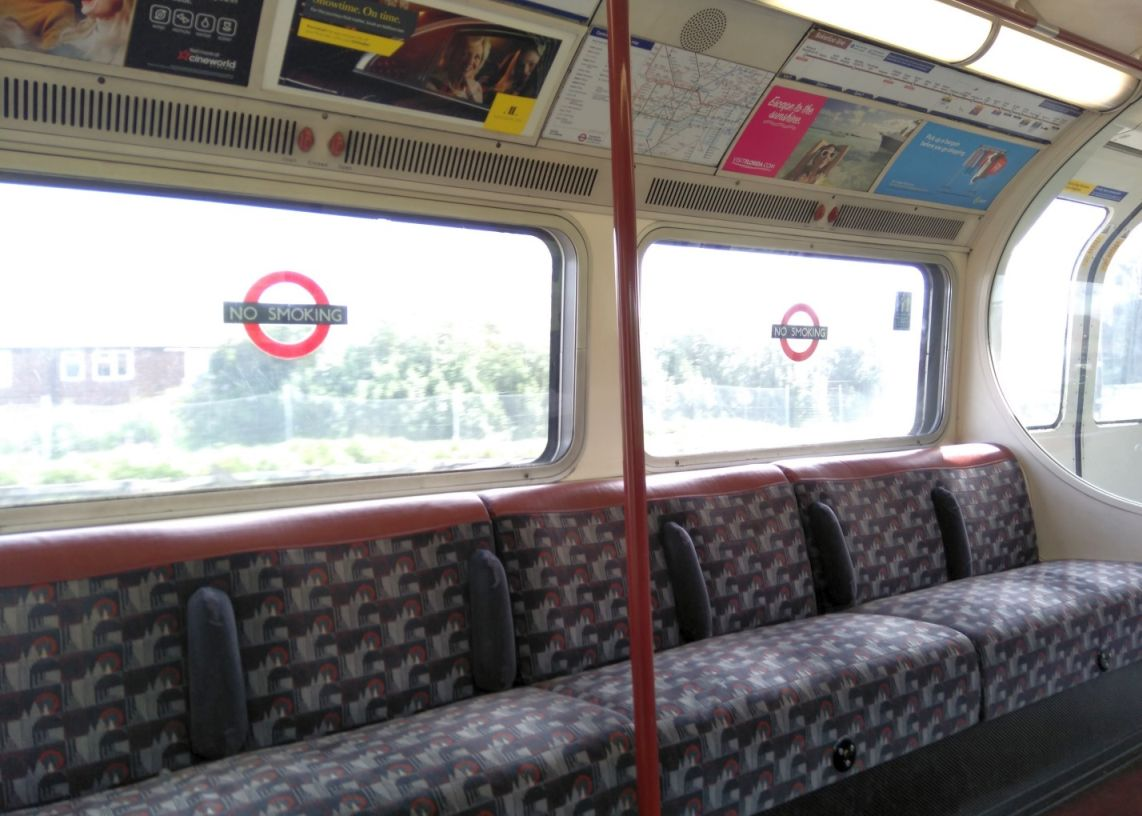
NO SMOKING signs using the roundel which are now present only on the 1972 stock trains of the Bakerloo line

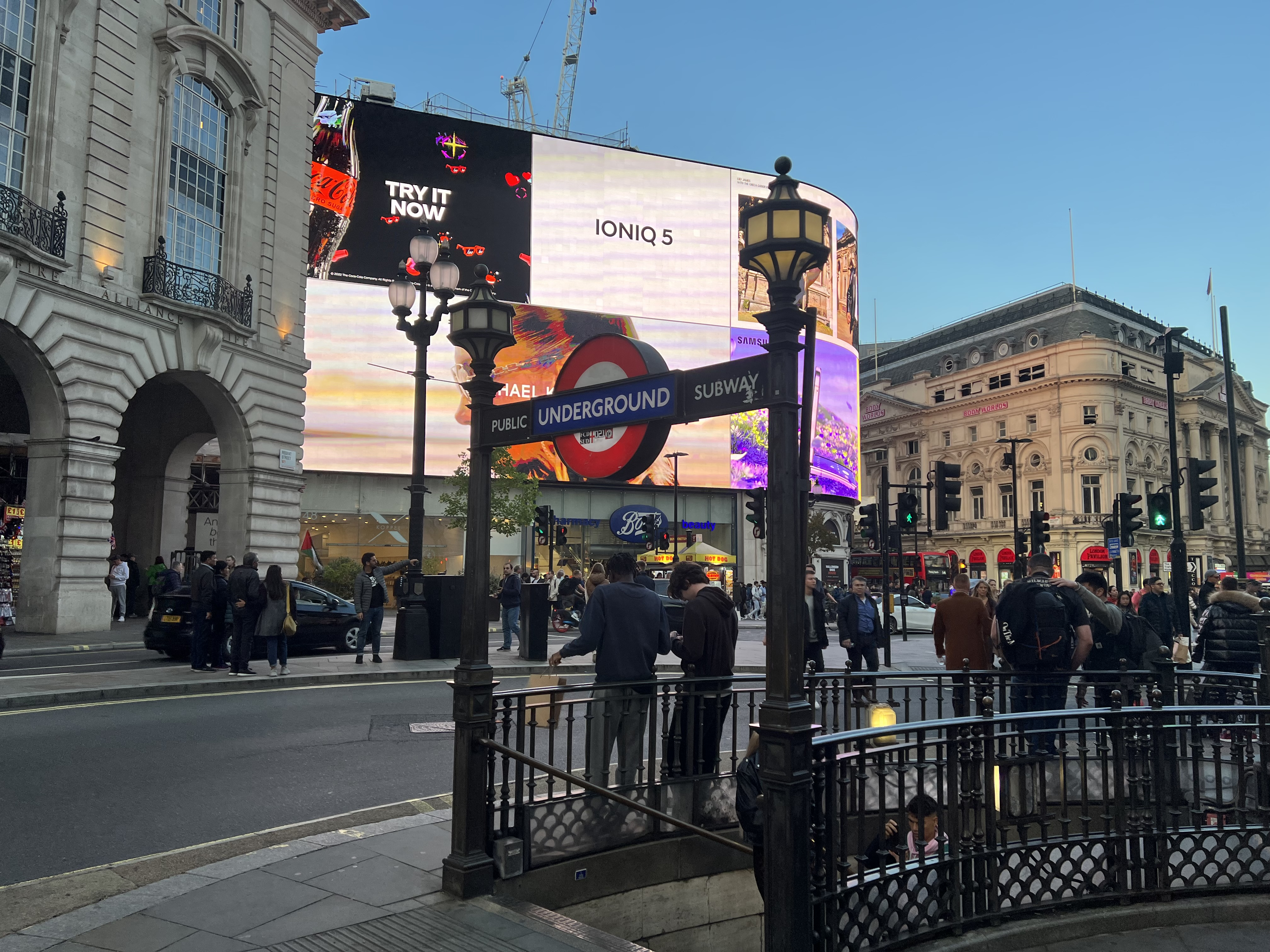
Subway entrance to Piccadilly Circus tube station

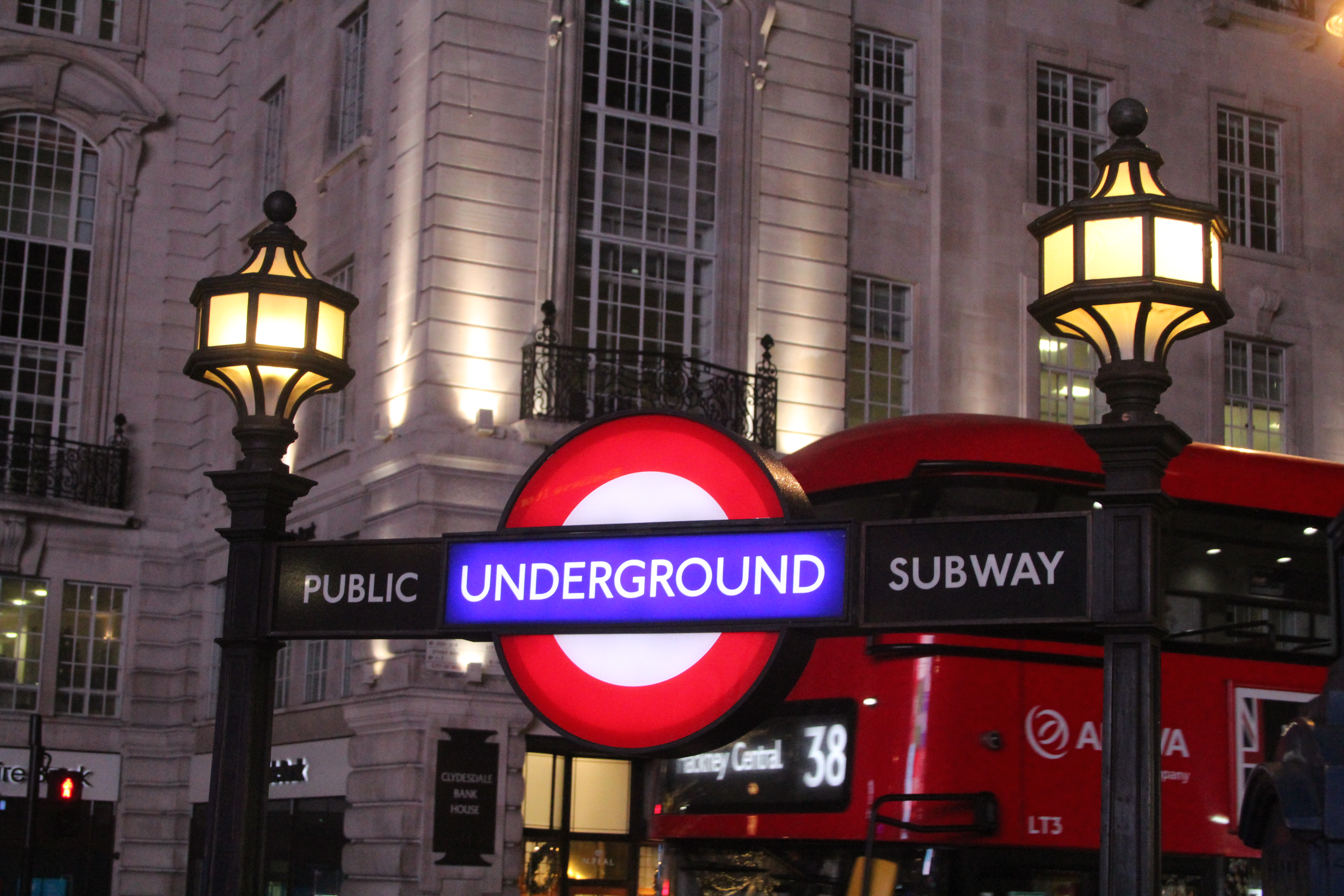
Close-up of sign at night

=== Architecture ===
Seventy-one of the 272 London Underground stations use buildings that are on the Statutory List of Buildings of Special Architectural or Historic Interest, and five have entrances in listed buildings. A further 55 have local listings, and 91 are located within conservation areas. The Metropolitan Railway's original seven stations were inspired by Italianate designs, with the platforms lit by daylight from above and by gas lights in large glass globes. Early District Railway stations were similar and on both railways the further from central London the station the simpler the construction. The City & South London Railway opened with red-brick buildings, designed by Thomas Phillips Figgis, topped with a lead-covered dome that contained the lift mechanism and weather vane (still visible at many stations, such as Clapham Common). The Central London Railway appointed Harry Bell Measures as architect, who designed its pinkish-brown steel-framed buildings with larger entrances.

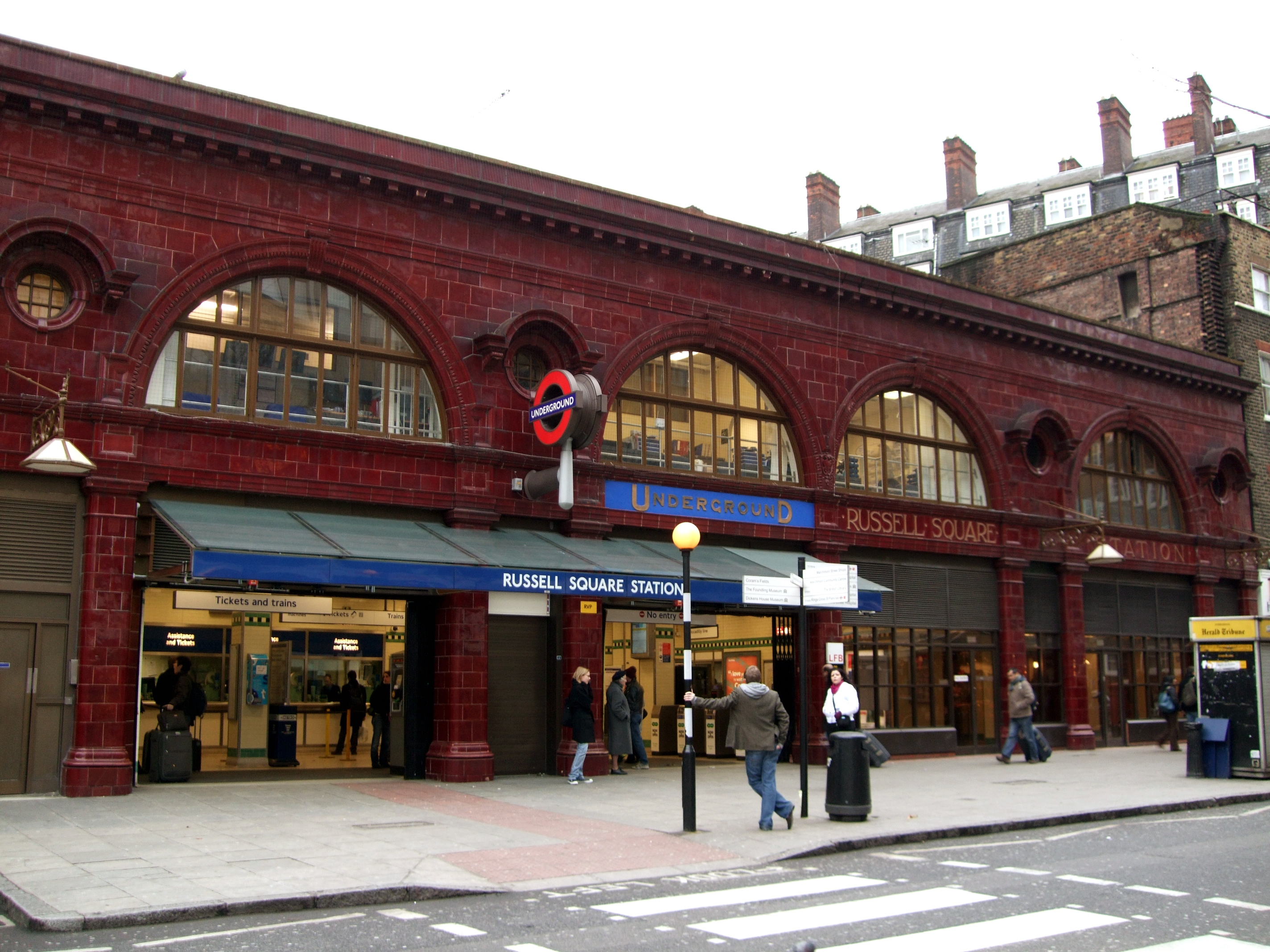
Russell Square, one of the UERL stations designed by Leslie Green clad in ox-blood tiles

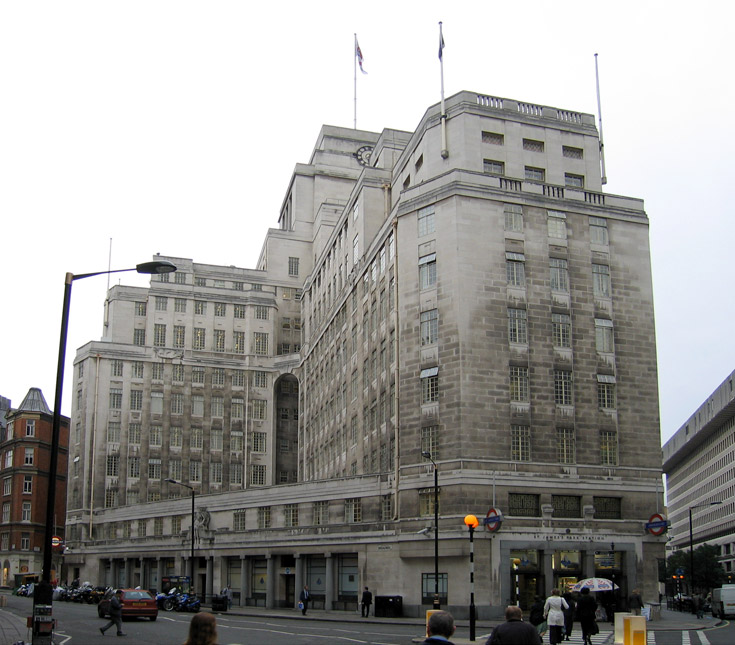
55 Broadway, above St James's Park station, was designed by Charles Holden in 1927 and is one of only two Grade I listed buildings on the Underground.

In the first decade of the 20th century Leslie Green established a house style for the tube stations built by the UERL, which were clad in ox-blood faience blocks. Green pioneered using building design to guide passengers with direction signs on tiled walls, with the stations given a unique identity with patterns on the platform walls. Many of these tile patterns survive, though a significant number of these are now replicas. Harry W. Ford was responsible for the design of at least 17 UERL and District Railway stations, including Barons Court and Embankment, and claimed to have first thought of enlarging the U and D in the UNDERGROUND wordmark. The Met's architect Charles Walter Clark had used a neo-classical design for rebuilding Baker Street and Paddington Praed Street stations before the First World War and, although the fashion had changed, continued with Farringdon in 1923. The buildings had metal lettering attached to pale walls. Clark would later design "Chiltern Court", the large, luxurious block of apartments at Baker Street, that opened in 1929. In the 1920s and 1930s, Charles Holden designed a series of modernist and art-deco stations some of which he described as his 'brick boxes with concrete lids'. Holden's design for the Underground's headquarters building at 55 Broadway included avant-garde sculptures by Jacob Epstein, Eric Gill and Henry Moore.

When the Central line was extended east, the stations were simplified Holden proto-Brutalist designs, and a cavernous concourse built at Gants Hill in honour of early Moscow Metro stations (for which the LPTB supplied engineers). Few new stations were built in the 50 years after 1948, but Misha Black was appointed design consultant for the 1960s Victoria line, contributing to the line's uniform look, with each station having an individual tile motif. Notable stations from this period include Moor Park, the stations of the Piccadilly line extension to Heathrow and Hillingdon.

In recent years, the stations of the 1990s Jubilee Line Extension were designed in a high-tech style by architects such as Norman Foster and Michael Hopkins. The project was critically acclaimed, with the Royal Fine Arts Commission describing the project as "an example of patronage at its best and most enlightened", and two stations shortlisted for the Stirling Prize. Stations were built to the latest standards, future proofed for growth, with innovations such as Platform screen doors. West Ham station was built as a homage to the red brick tube stations of the 1930s, using brick, concrete and glass.

Many platforms have unique interior designs to help passenger identification. The tiling at Baker Street incorporates repetitions of Sherlock Holmes's silhouette; at Tottenham Court Road semi-abstract mosaics by Eduardo Paolozzi feature musical instruments, tape machines and butterflies; and at Charing Cross, David Gentleman designed the mural depicting the construction of the Eleanor Cross. Robyn Denny designed the murals on the Northern line platforms at Embankment.

=== Johnston typeface ===
The first posters used various typefaces, as was contemporary practice, and station signs used sans serif block capitals. The Johnston typeface was developed in upper and lower case in 1916, and a complete set of blocks, marked Johnston Sans, was made by the printers the following year. A bold version of the capitals was developed by Johnston in 1929. The Metropolitan Railway changed to a serif letterform for its signs in the 1920s, used on the stations rebuilt by Clark. Johnston was adopted systemwide after the formation of the LPTB in 1933 and the LT wordmark was applied to locomotives and carriages. Johnston was redesigned, becoming New Johnston, for photo-typesetting in the early 1980s when Elichi Kono designed a range that included Light, Medium and Bold, each with its italic version. The typesetters P22 developed today's electronic version, sometimes called TfL Johnston, in 1997.

=== Posters and patronage of the arts ===
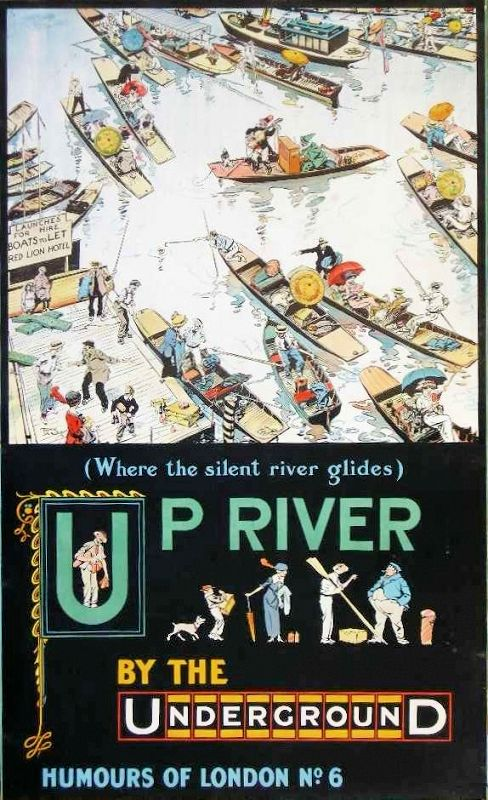
1913 Underground poster by Tony Sarg

Early advertising posters used various typefaces. Graphic posters first appeared in the 1890s, and it became possible to print colour images economically in the early 20th century. The Central London Railway used colour illustrations in their 1905 poster, and from 1908 the Underground Group, under Pick's direction, used images of country scenes, shopping and major events on posters to encourage use of the tube. Pick found he was limited by the commercial artists the printers used, and so commissioned work from artists and designers such as Dora Batty, Edward McKnight Kauffer, the cartoonist George Morrow, Herry (Heather) Perry, Graham Sutherland, Charles Sharland and the sisters Anna and Doris Zinkeisen. According to Ruth Artmonsky, more than 150 women artists were commissioned by Pick and latterly Christian Barman to design posters for London Underground, London Transport and London County Council Tramways.

The Johnston Sans letter font began appearing on posters from 1917. The Met, strongly independent, used images on timetables and on the cover of its Metro-land guide that promoted the country it served for the walker, visitor and later the house-hunter. By the time London Transport was formed in 1933 the UERL was considered a patron of the arts and more than 1000 works were commissioned in the 1930s, such as the cartoon images of Charles Burton and Kauffer's later abstract cubist and surrealist images. Harold Hutchison became London Transport publicity officer in 1947, after the Second World War and nationalisation, and introduced the "pair poster", where an image on a poster was paired with text on another. Numbers of commissions dropped, to eight a year in the 1950s and just four a year in the 1970s, with images from artists such Harry Stevens and Tom Eckersley.

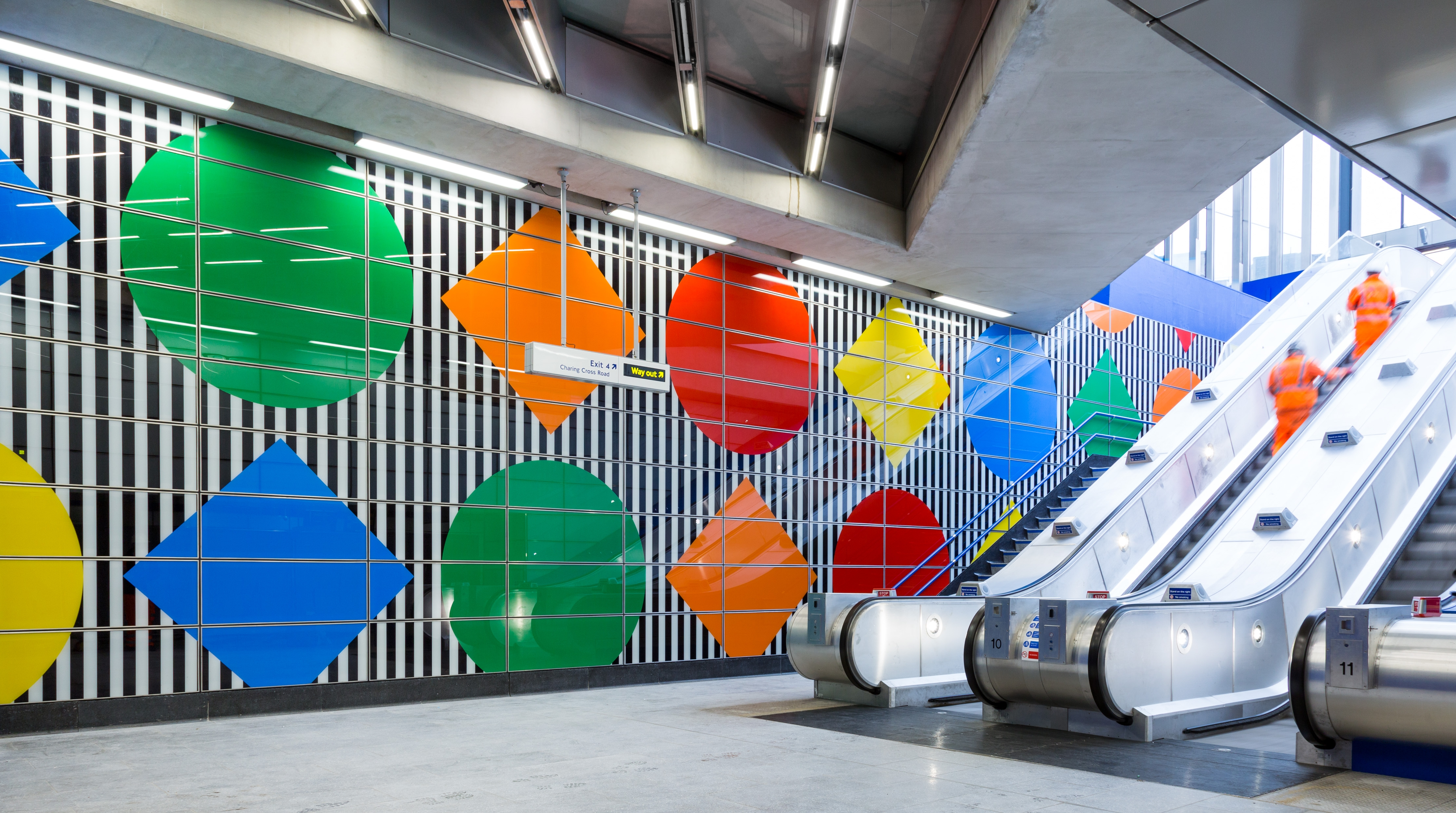
Artwork by Daniel Buren at Tottenham Court Road, commissioned by Art on the Underground

Art on the Underground was launched in 2000 to revive London Underground as a patron of the arts. Today, commissions range from the pocket Tube map cover, to temporary artworks, to large-scale permanent installations in stations. Major commissions by Art on the Underground in recent years have included Labyrinth by the Turner Prize–winning artist Mark Wallinger, to mark the 150th anniversary of the Underground; Diamonds and Circles, permanent works in situ by the French artist Daniel Buren at Tottenham Court Road; and Beauty < Immortality, a memorial to Frank Pick by Langlands & Bell at Piccadilly Circus.

Similarly, since 1986, Poems on the Underground has commissioned poetry that is displayed in trains.

=== In popular culture ===
The Underground (including several fictitious stations) has appeared in many movies and television shows, including Skyfall, Death Line, Die Another Day, Sliding Doors, An American Werewolf in London, Creep, Tube Tales, Sherlock and Neverwhere. The London Underground Film Office received more than 200 requests to film in 2000. The Underground has also featured in music such as the Jam's "Down in the Tube Station at Midnight" and in literature such as the graphic novel V for Vendetta. Popular legends about the Underground being haunted persist to this day. In 2016, British composer Daniel Liam Glyn released his concept album Changing Stations based on the 11 main tube lines of the London Underground network.

It has also served as the setting of several video games, including 2020 construction and management simulation game Overcrowd: A Commute 'Em Up, in which the player manages an underground station, and Call of Duty: Modern Warfare 3, which has a single-player level named Mind The Gap where most of the level takes place between the dockyards and Westminster while the player and a team of SAS attempt to take down terrorists attempting to escape using the London Underground via a hijacked train. The game also features the multiplayer map "Underground", in which players are combating in a fictitious Underground station. The London Underground map serves as a playing field for the conceptual game of Mornington Crescent (which is named after a station on the Northern line) and the board game The London Game.

In 1999, Carlton Television premiered a London Underground themed regional game show (Greater London area only) also called Mind the Gap.

In 2023, social media influencer Sabrina Bahsoon created the viral '#TubeGirl' trend on TikTok, which involved Bahsoon and other users lip-syncing and dancing while on-board trains in the Underground network.

=== Busking ===
The London Underground provides busking permits for up to 39 pitches across 25 central London stations, with more than 100,000 hours of live music performed each year. Performers are chosen by audition, with previous buskers including Ed Sheeran, George Michael and Rod Stewart.

== Notable people ==
- Harry Beck (1902–1974) designed the tube map, named in 2006 as a British design icon.
- Hannah Dadds (1941–2011), the first female train driver on the London Underground.
- John Fowler (1817–1898) was the railway engineer that designed the Metropolitan Railway.
- MacDonald Gill (1884–1947), cartographer credited with drawing, in 1914, "the map that saved the London Underground".
- James Henry Greathead (1844–1896) was the engineer that dug the Tower Subway using a wrought iron shield patented by Peter W. Barlow, and later used the same tunnelling shield to build the deep-tube City & South London and Central London railways.
- Edward Johnston (1872–1944) developed the Johnston Sans typeface, still in use today on the London Underground.
- Charles Pearson (1793–1862) suggested an underground railway in London in 1845 and from 1854 promoted a scheme that eventually became the Metropolitan Railway.
- Frank Pick (1878–1941) was UERL publicity officer from 1908, commercial manager from 1912 and joint managing director from 1928. He was chief executive and vice-chairman of the LPTB from 1933 to 1940. It was Pick that commissioned Edward Johnston to create the typeface and redesign the roundel, and established the Underground's reputation as patrons of the arts as users of the best in contemporary poster art and architecture.
- Robert Selbie (1868–1930) was manager of the Metropolitan Railway from 1908 until his death, marketing it using the Metro-land brand.
- Edgar Speyer (1862–1932) Financial backer of Yerkes who served as UERL chairman from 1906 to 1915 during its formative years.
- Albert Stanley (1874–1948) was manager of the UERL from 1907, and became the first chairman of the London Passenger Transport Board (LPTB) in 1933.
- Edward Watkin (1819–1901) was chairman of the Metropolitan Railway from 1872 to 1894.
- Charles Yerkes (1837–1905) was an American who founded the Underground Electric Railways Company of London (UERL) in 1902, which opened three tube lines and electrified the District Railway.

== See also ==
- Automation of the London Underground
- List of London Underground stations
- List of busiest London Underground stations
- London Underground mosquito
- London Underground strikes
- London UnderRound
- Timeline of the London Underground
