= London UnderRound =

Overground running course connecting underground stations

The London UnderRound Marathon, also sometimes referred to as the London Underground marathon, is an unofficial running route in London, between 42 Zone 1 London Underground stations. The route was created by runner Rory Coleman in 2008 and is between 42 km and 48 km depending on the route selection. Traditionally starting and finishing at Kings Cross Station, each runner is required to touch the yellow line of the underground platform at each station using only the stairs or escalators to reach the platform, which creates 914 meters of elevation change.

The fastest known time for the course was set by David Hellard in 2016 in a time of 3 hrs, 20 mins and 18 seconds.
