= London TravelWatch =

British consumer organisation

- London TravelWatch logo 2024
- Formation: July 2000
- Purpose: Transport watchdog
- Headquarters: London, SE1; United Kingdom
- Region served: Greater London and neighbouring areas
- Chair: Tricia Hayes
- Main organ: Board
- Website: www.londontravelwatch.org.uk

London TravelWatch is a statutory British consumer organisation that campaigns for improvements to transport in London. It deals with all complaints from passengers using any Transport for London modes including some cycling and pedestrian issues, Victoria coach station (but not coaches or coach journeys), passengers using Eurostar (but not Eurotunnel), the Heathrow Express rail service to Heathrow Airport and some aspects of rail travel including issues arising from the stations. It also deals with all rail complaints that are outside of the scope of the rail ombudsman and within its geographical remit. It is therefore in consumer representation terms an "appeals body". It is funded by the London Assembly and was established in its current form in July 2000.

== History ==
The origins of London TravelWatch can be traced back over 70 years to the time of nationalisation of parts of the public transport network under the postwar Labour Government. The creation of the state-owned British Transport Commission in 1947 was accompanied by a system for national and regional advisory committees set up to represent the public interest. London was represented by the "Transport Users Consultative Committee for London", which had a duty to consider and make recommendations relating to matters brought to its notice by users, transport providers, or which it considered merited investigation. This responsibility has remained broadly unaltered and is part of TravelWatch's statutory remit today. What has changed is the extent of the body's geographical and modal remit; responsibility for its appointment and remuneration; and on several occasions, its name.

These changes were due to changes in both the way transport was run and the way London was governed. By the 1970s a "London Transport Passengers Committee" existed, appointed and paid for by the Greater London Council (GLC). It represented passengers of London Transport services but not those of the railways (still nationalised at that time). Rail passengers had separate representation by a rail users regional committee, part of a national network of rail users' committees.

When the GLC was abolished in 1986, the "London Transport Passengers Committee" became the "London Regional Passengers Committee". Its remit was extended to British Rail passengers in and around London, so in effect it absorbed the rail users' regional committee for London.

When the Greater London Authority was established in 2000 it was renamed again, this time as the "London Transport Users Committee", which remains its legal name, and had its remit extended again to cover all activities of Transport for London, other than freight. In practice this included parts of the road network, so car users became part of its responsibility: there is also a duty to take particular account of the needs of pedestrians and cyclists.

In 2011, the Liberal Democrat, Labour and Conservative members of the London Assembly Transport Committee suggested abolishing the body, and folding it into the London Assembly itself.

== Remit ==
London TravelWatch's remit covers all services provided by Transport for London, including the London Underground, London Buses, the Docklands Light Railway, Tramlink, Dial-a-Ride services, London River Services and the Woolwich Ferry, the Public Carriage Office (taxis and private hire cars), Barclays Cycle Hire, and services operated by National Rail train operating companies starting or ending in London that are outside of the scope of the rail ombudsman and within our geographical remit, the Heathrow Express and Eurostar. The geographical area of the rail remit extends far beyond the boundaries of Greater London itself, and includes sizeable areas in the counties of certain areas outside of London from where passengers travel into and out of London. This means that over half of all rail journeys within Great Britain relate to the area covered by London TravelWatch.

The role of London TravelWatch is to:

- investigate suggestions and complaints from users who are dissatisfied with the response received from the service provider;
- conduct independent research and produce publications on issues affecting transport users
- maintain a regular dialogue with operators;
- assess the impact and make recommendations if proposals are made for the closure of a railway line or a station.

== Board ==
The full complement of the London TravelWatch board is a chair plus six ordinary members appointed for a four-year term. The board is appointed by the London Assembly Transport Committee. Members of the London Assembly may not be appointed to the board, but London Borough councillors may be. Vacancies are advertised when they arise, and the appointments are made from amongst applicants by the GLA according to the rules governing public appointments that are to be made on the basis of merit. Tricia Hayes was appointed to replace Arthur Leathley as chair in February 2024. Tricia Hayes was also appointed by the GLA to sit on the Board of Transport Focus (previously Passenger Focus) to represent London in national rail matters and to facilitate coordination between the two bodies.
