= IBus (London) =

Information system for buses in London

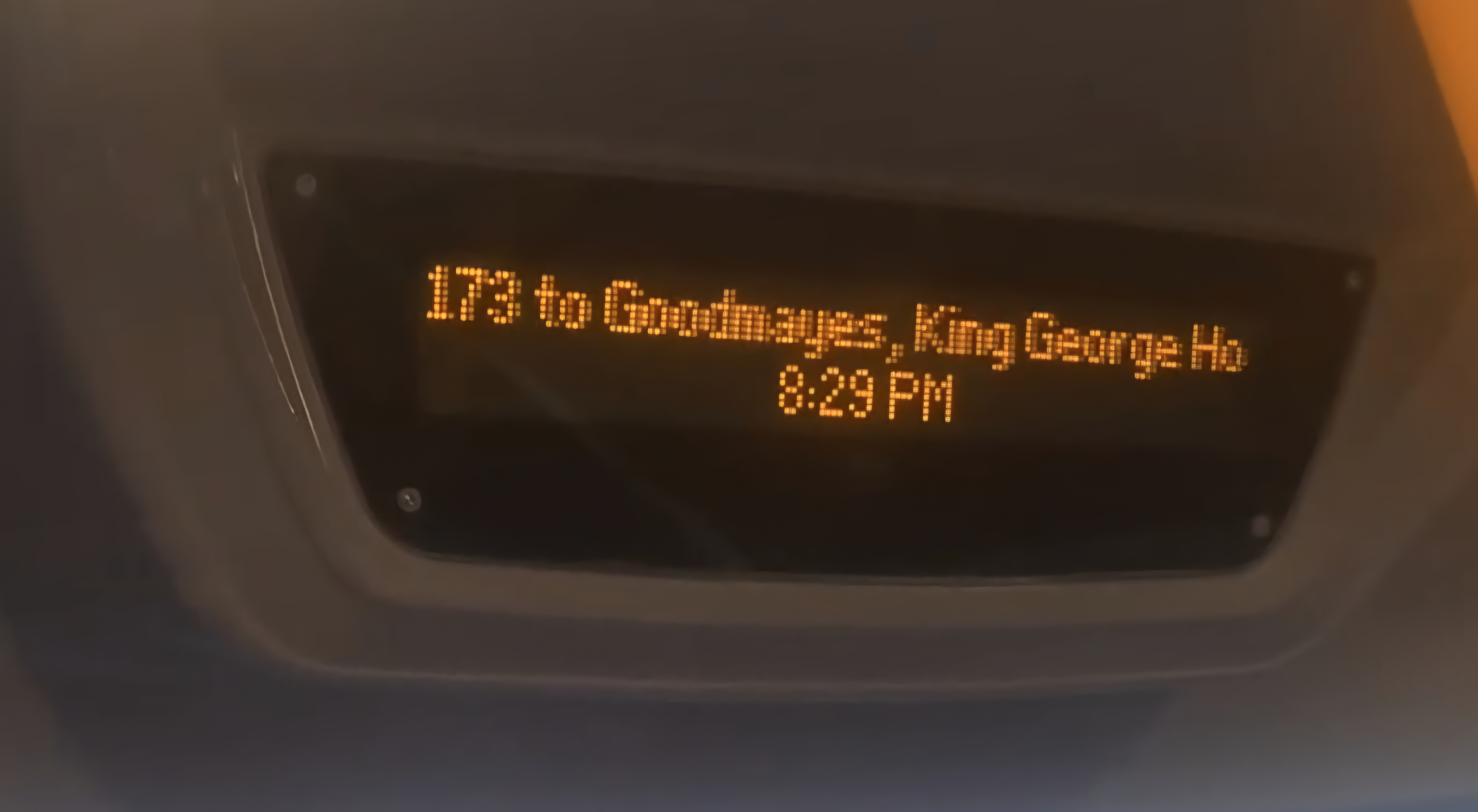
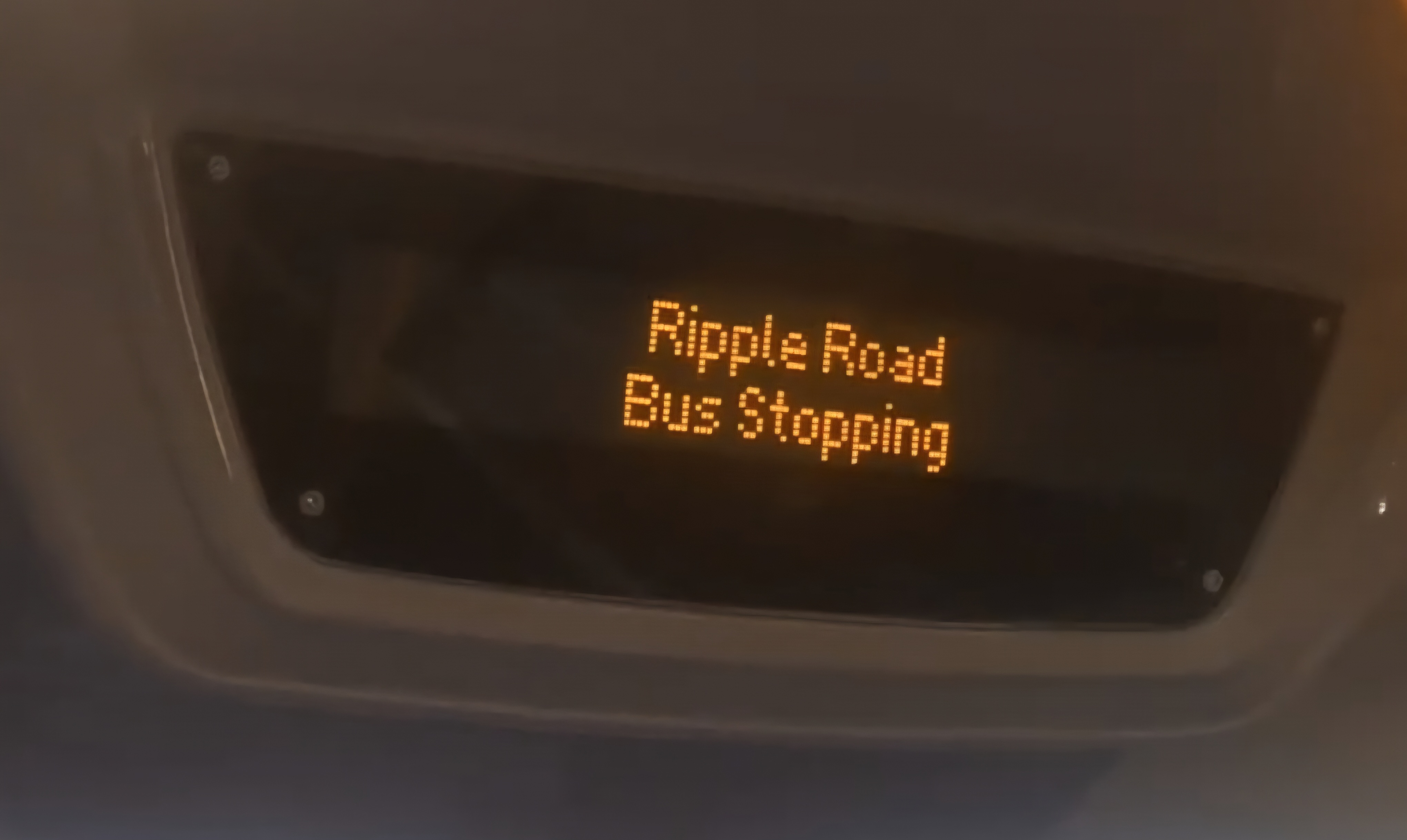
iBus displays on London Buses convey stop, destination and additional information to passengers

iBus is an Automatic Vehicle Location (AVL) system to improve London Buses using technology installed by Siemens. The system tracks all London's buses, providing passengers with audio-visual announcements and improved information on bus arrivals, as well as triggering bus priority at traffic lights.

The system was introduced following concerns in 2005 that London buses "fail deaf people". As a result, the iBus system was announced on 16 January 2006, initially being tried on route 149 for eight weeks. After successful initial tests in 2006, radio presenter Emma Hignett was chosen to record all announcements after popularity in a user survey, being rolled out on all London buses between 2007-09. As of 2024, Transport for London have begun to replace iBus with an improved system.

== Announcements ==
Upon boarding the bus, for example, route 177 serving Peckham, iBus plays the announcement: "177, to, Peckham" and corresponding text appears on the visual displays. As the bus approaches the stop, the on-board system will announce and display the bus stop name. Since March 2014, the space below this name shows the current time. When a passenger has rung the bell, this is replaced by the message "Bus Stopping". Sometimes when an Underground line is closed, or special events take place, the space below would also display information about that type of event occurring and to inform passengers to take alternative routes to reach their destination. When the approaching bus stop nears a cycle lane or slip road, additional announcements will be played to remind passengers cross them with care. For example, a bus arriving near St.Thomas' Hospital / County Hall will say: "St.Thomas Hospital / County Hall. For your safety, please cross the cycle lane with caution", and the following message will scroll across the dot matrix indicators:

St.Thomas Hospital/County Hall Cycle Lane - Caution

An example of another version being:

Aldgate East Station Cross cycle lane with caution

Similar to the London Underground, iBus has a feature that tells passengers to alight at a key stop, which is near a key place that the bus will not serve. For example, a bus arriving near the Tate Modern art gallery will say: "Lavington Street. Alight here for Tate Modern", and the following message will scroll across the dot matrix indicators:

Lavington Street for Tate Modern

Each bus contains a Microsoft Windows–based computer that has the details of all 19,000 bus stops in London. The system has over 30,000 announcements for 700 bus routes.

Alongside route information, iBus can also play 'operational' pre-recorded announcements to passengers on board the bus.

== Tracking ==
The iBus system aims to provide a better fix on bus locations than the old Selective Vehicle Detection (SVD) system. iBus can locate every bus to an accuracy of about ten metres, or its distance from the nearest stop by around ten seconds. It does this using several instruments:

- Global Positioning System (GPS)
- Odometers, including speedometer
- Turn-rate sensor
- Rate gyro

The essential part of the system relies on GPS satellite data that roughly determine the location of a bus down to 100 metres. Data collected from GPS is passed into a Kalman filter, and other data including velocity and temperature is calculated on the bus and transmitted every 30 seconds via GPRS. With the bus network map, this helps the Central System to make a "best guess" of the bus position and depicts the overall image derived from the data provided by all buses, even in areas with poor GPS reception. The Central System can update the countdown signs as before that now has a more accurate prediction derived from all this data. Knowing the location of the bus, controllers have the means to regulate the service more efficiently, and priority can be given to a bus at over 4000 traffic lights across London.

CentreComm, the 24/7 Emergency Command and Control Centre, is able to track the location of every bus in the fleet and can share this information immediately with the emergency services in the event of an emergency or accident.

== Other applications ==
Although iBus was rolled out in 2008, it was not until 2011 that the data was made available to other applications, such as text messaging and the Internet.

With text messaging, bus users can send a text with the bus stop code to receive real-time bus arrival times for that stop. Visually impaired passengers will be able to use the text-to-speech facility on their mobile phones to get the information too. However, users will have the pay the standard network rate for sending the text, plus an additional 12p charge to receive the response.

On the Internet, the latest service information is available using mobile web or the Internet.

Countdown signs are signs at bus stops giving users information about when the next bus is due. With iBus, Countdown is able to provide real-time information at 2,500 key bus stops in London. Communications improvements have also meant that Countdown can now display service updates, disruption information and network-wide messages. The rollout of the new signs at key locations was completed in June 2012. iBus was integrated with Countdown by Telent. And the signs were supplied, installed and maintenance by ACIS and Trueform. IVU.realtime from IVU Traffic Technologies AG, Germany, forms the central system of Countdown II.

iBus supplies data to the Transport for London open data systems in order to allow external websites, such as bustimes.org, to provide live bus position and countdown information.

== Cost ==
The cost of fitting iBus to buses and garages up to 3 January 2009 was £18.8m which was part of a Transport for London (TfL) £117m upgrade to the bus fleet communications system.

== Complaints ==
The number of complaints received from bus companies or TfL employees relating to the use of the iBus between 23 January 2008 and 11 February 2009 was 254. Most of these complaints were due to faults in iBus, with the majority stating there were no display data or no announcements being made. However, there were also complaints associated with incorrect display data and announcements.

In early 2018, TfL received criticism from both passengers and the media following the introduction of an iBus announcement warning passengers when the vehicle was about to start moving. The warning was added with the aim of reducing the number of injuries caused by passengers losing balance when the bus accelerated, but it was largely considered an annoyance because the announcement was repeated at every stop, usually after the bus had already been travelling for several seconds. TfL attempted to adjust the timing and wording of the announcement (from "Please hold on; the bus is about to move" to "Please hold on while the bus is moving") but the announcement was eventually removed at the end of a trial period.

== Replacement ==
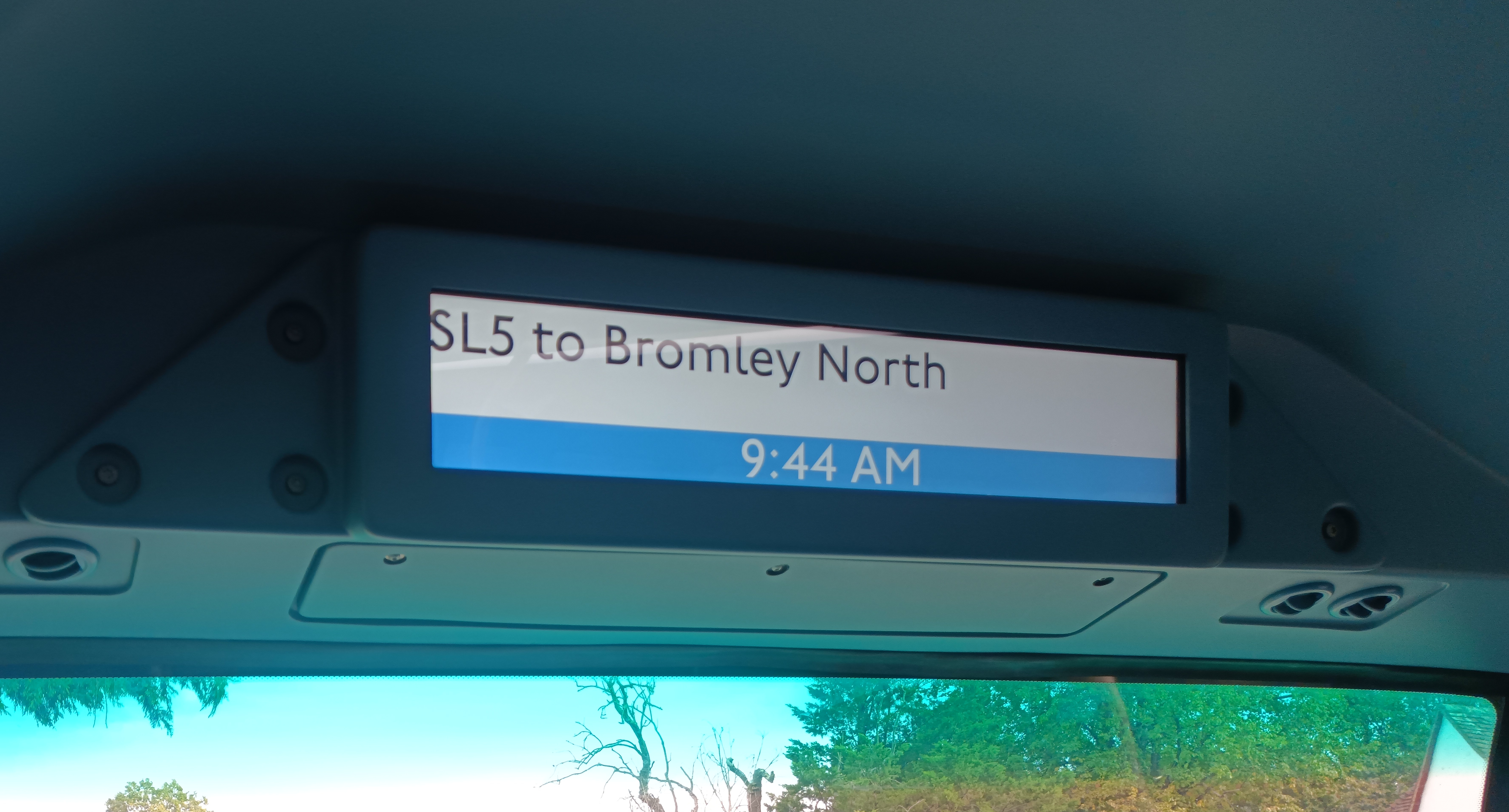
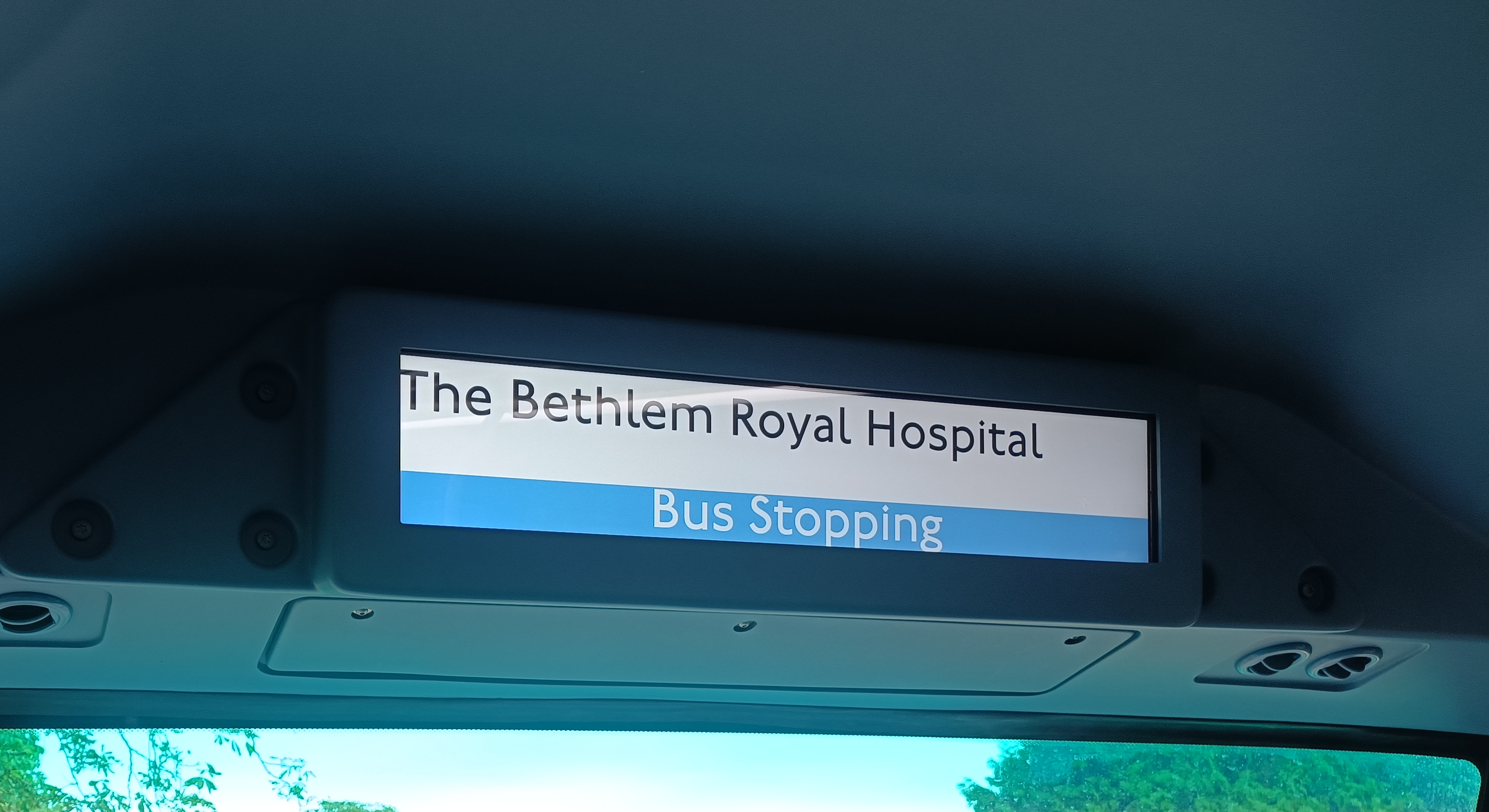
Newer iBus displays on London Buses convey stop, destination and additional information to passengers

In 2024, TfL signed a 10 year, £160 million contract with INIT to replace the current iBus system. The new system will improve the real-time tracking of buses, improving disruption and diversion information, as well as integrating information for bus drivers.

== See also ==
- Selective vehicle detection (previous bus priority system used by London Buses)
