= Art on the Underground =

Public art programme on the London Underground

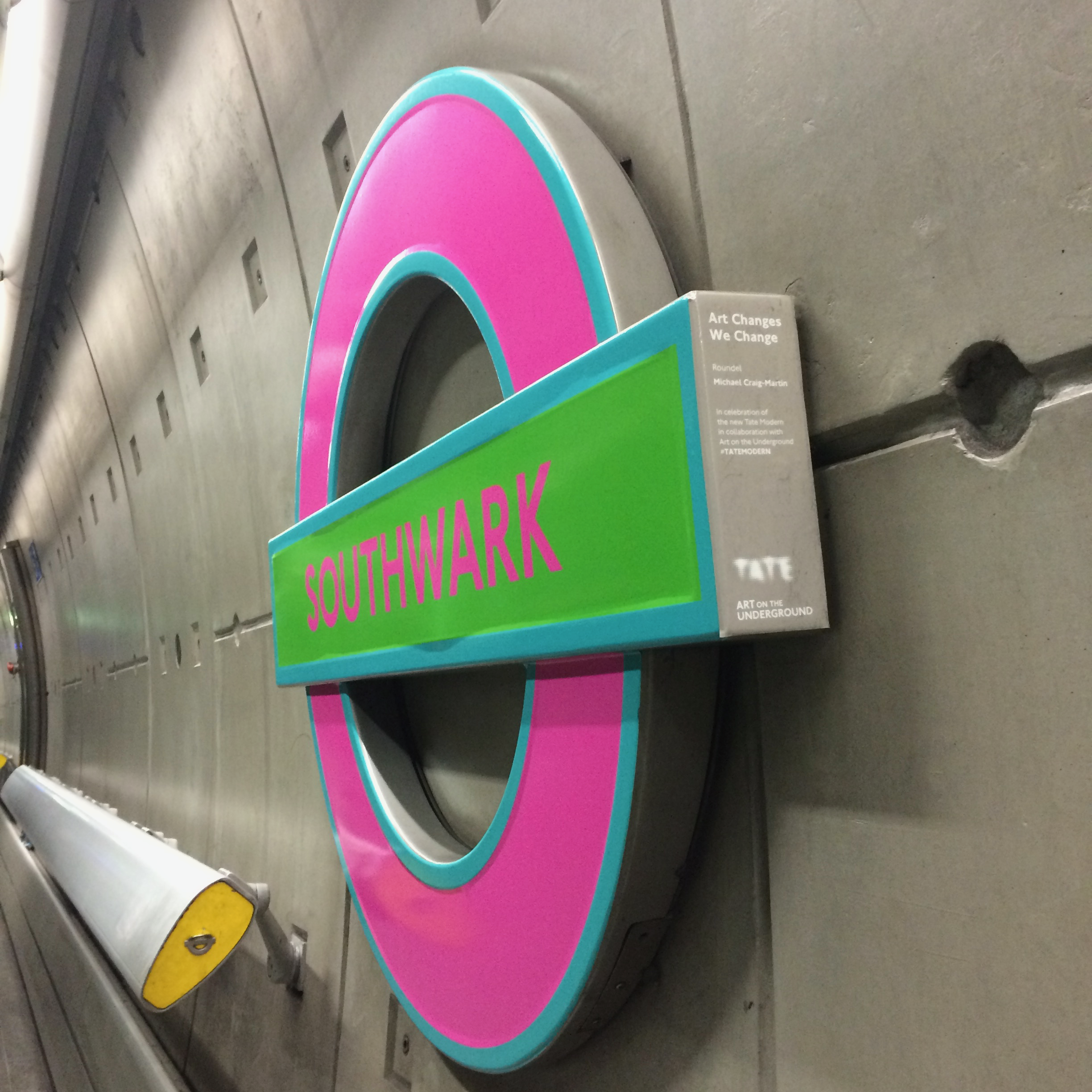
Roundel design by Michael Craig-Martin at Southwark tube station

Art on the Underground, previously called Platform for Art, is Transport for London's (TfL) contemporary public art programme. It commissions permanent and temporary artworks for London Underground, as well as commissioning artists to create covers for the Tube map, one of the largest public art commissions in the UK.

== History ==
From the late 1900s, London Underground's Managing Director Frank Pick began commissioning leading artists and designers to work on poster campaigns for the rapidly expanding network. Pick also steered the development of the London Underground's corporate identity, establishing a highly recognisable brand such as the Underground roundel, Johnston typeface and the tube map designed by Harry Beck.

Following Pick, London Underground continued to commission artists to design advertising posters, or pieces of artwork for stations. However, this work was ad hoc, and usually project-based. For example, as part of the building of the Victoria line in the 1960s, tiled artwork was installed in the seat recesses of all the stations – such as the cross containing a crown at King's Cross St Pancras, the "tonne of bricks" at Brixton and the Black Horse at Blackhorse Road.

In the late 1980s, London Underground began commissioning artists as part of a programme to fill unsold advertising space with artwork. The "Art on the Underground" series was usually focused on locations that could be reached by Underground. Posters were also available for purchase at the London Transport Museum, bringing in additional revenue.

In 2000, Platform for Art was launched, as a dedicated art programme for London Underground. Initially, the main focus was temporary artworks on the disused platform at Gloucester Road station. From 2004, artists have been commissioned to create covers for the Underground's Tube map.

In 2007, Platform for Art was rebranded as Art on the Underground, with the aim of expanding the art programme to other temporary sites, as well as the commissioning of permanent artworks. The programme and its artworks have been critically acclaimed, with the programme winning a culture award by the International Association of Public Transport in 2009.

== The programme ==
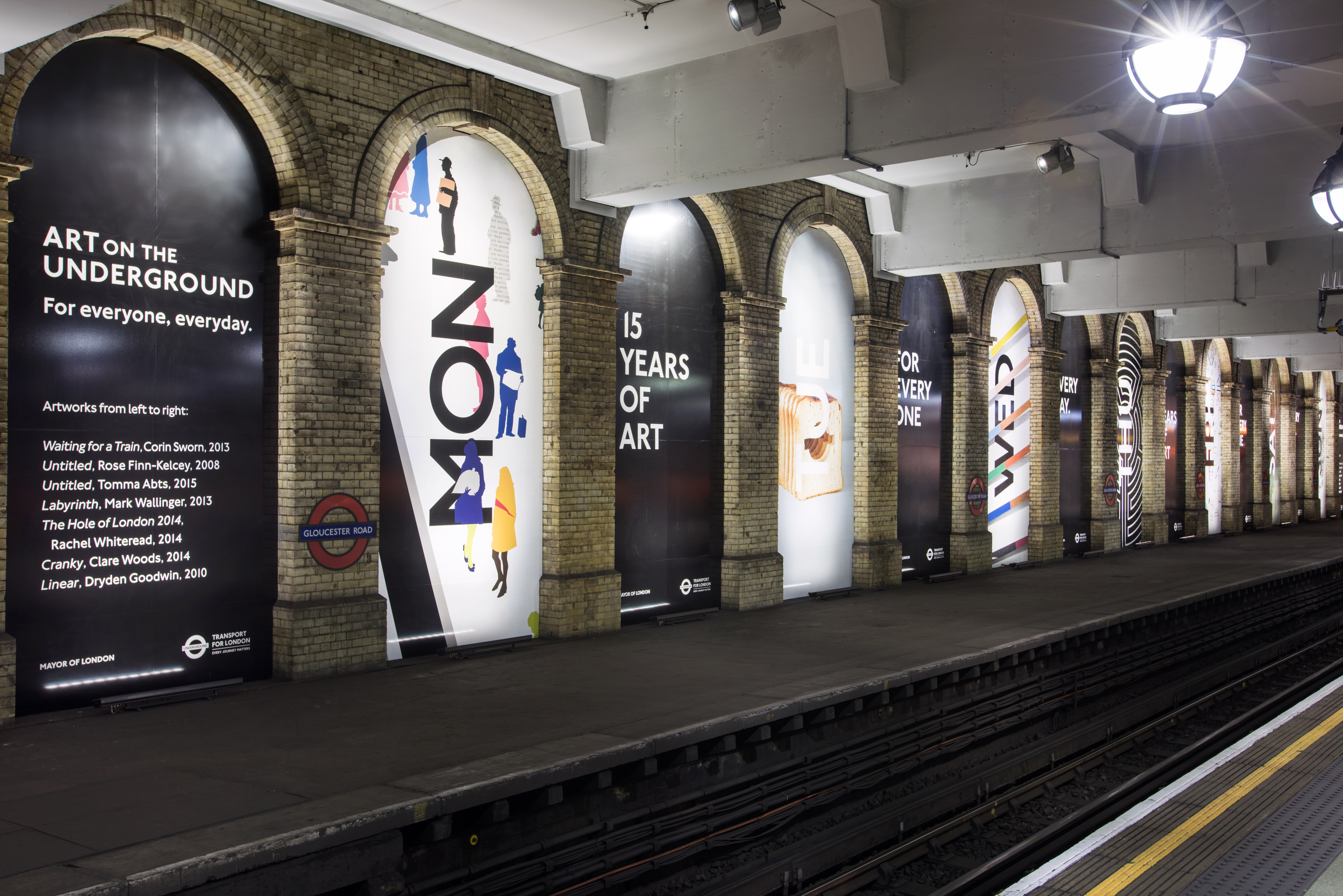
Murals celebrating the various artworks commissioned on the disused platform at Gloucester Road station

Art on the Underground commissions a wide range of temporary and permanent artworks, working with a wide range of British and international artists as well as the local community, passengers and TfL staff.

Proposed artworks are reviewed by an advisory board of TfL and Greater London Authority staff, as well as art experts. The programme is funded by Transport for London, although other funding sources such as Arts Council England and corporate sponsorship is used for some commissions.

=== Temporary artworks ===
Since 2000, an entire disused platform at Gloucester Road station has used as a backdrop for temporary exhibitions including sculptures, murals or photographs. The first piece commissioned for Gloucester Road was an Elephant sculpture by Kendra Haste, which is now on permanent display at Waterloo tube station. Artists displayed at Gloucester Road have included David Shrigley, Chiho Aoshima and Brian Griffiths. In 2018, British artist Heather Phillipson filled the 80m platform with egg sculptures and video screens in an installation titled "my name is lettie eggsyrub", to critical acclaim.

Since 2018, the Brixton station entrance known as the "Brixton Header Wall" has been the location of temporary murals, following the legacy of the Brixton murals in the 1980s. Artists have included Njideka Akunyili Crosby, Aliza Nisenbaum, Denzil Forrester and Joy Labinjo.

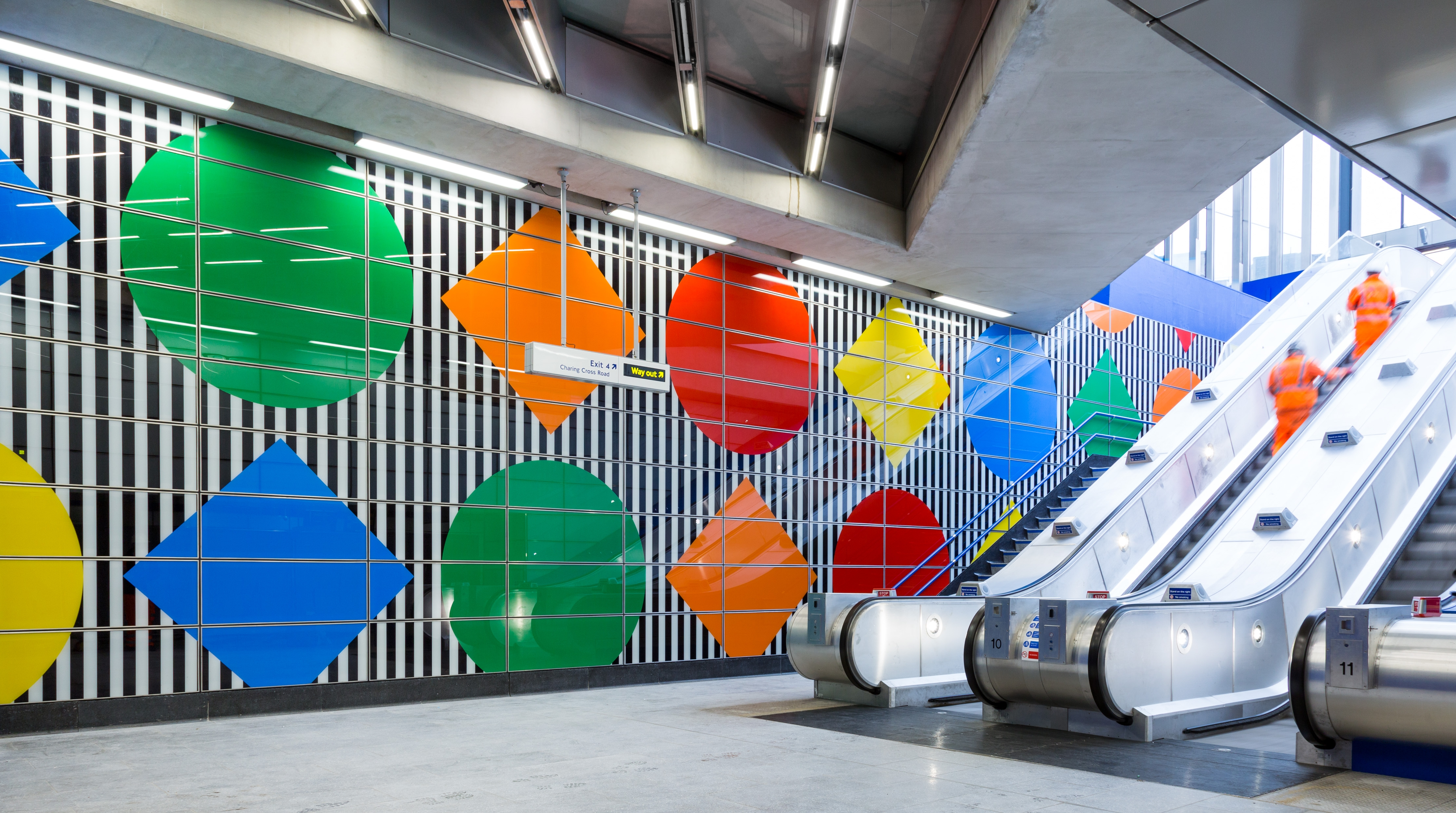
“Diamonds and Circle” permanent works “in situ” by Daniel Buren at Tottenham Court Road station

Other temporary works at stations have included the reimaging of the iconic Tube roundel in Pan African colours by Larry Achiampong at Westminster station, a temporary screen at Canary Wharf station showing video and films and "The Bower of Bliss" by Linder – a 85-metre-long billboard outside Southwark station. Other temporary works have been located across the network, such as Laure Prouvost's 2019 work that infiltrated advertising poster sites across all 270 stations, or the #LondonIsOpen campaign in the aftermath of the 2016 EU membership referendum.

Art on the Underground has also commissioned temporary artworks focused on one tube line. The most recent commission, "Underline" – Art & Music for the Victoria Line, was focused on the Victoria Line between 2015 and 2016, and featured artists and musicians such as Giles Round, Matt Rogers, Liam Gillick and Assemble. Previous line wide temporary projects include "Thin Cities" on the Piccadilly line, "One Thing Leads to Another – Everything is Connected" on the Jubilee line and the "Central Line Series" on the Central line.

In August 2023, a series of sound commissions by Art on the Underground was launched in a new strand of collaborative community engagement; the first work, by multidisciplinary artist Shenece Oretha, Route Words: Where are our voices aloud?, centred on the UK's oldest Black bookshop and publisher, New Beacon Books in Finsbury Park, and was shared via a poster campaign across the Tube network with a QR code allowing customers to listen to the audio on their journeys. Featuring extracts from the texts of Erna Brodber, Lorna Goodison, John La Rose, Kamau Brathwaite and Dennis Mitchell, writers published by New Beacon, the sound piece demonstrated the collective force of word and voice, "showcasing writing that speaks to the importance of space and language, to a range of communities, their histories and collective futures."

=== Permanent artworks ===
Art on the Underground also commissions new permanent pieces of artwork for London Underground – usually in conjunction with major expansion or upgrades of stations. The first permanent piece of artwork since the 1980s was commissioned in 2007, as part of the redevelopment of King's Cross St Pancras.

Other recent permanent pieces include "Diamonds and Circle" permanent works "in situ", a vast artwork in Tottenham Court Road by French conceptual artist Daniel Buren, "Beauty < Immortality", a memorial to Frank Pick by Langlands & Bell in Piccadilly Circus and "Pleasure's Inaccuracies" by Lucy McKenzie at Sudbury Town. Art on the Underground also promotes historical artwork pieces located across the Underground, such as Eduardo Paolozzi's 1980s mosaics at Tottenham Court Road.

In 2013, Turner Prize winning artist Mark Wallinger was commissioned to commemorate the 150th anniversary of the London Underground. The resulting piece – Labyrinth, is a multi-site artwork that was installed in all 270 Underground stations.

As part of the Northern line extension to Battersea, a permanent artwork was commissioned at Battersea Power Station from artist Alexandre da Cunha.

=== Tube map covers ===
The programme commissions artists to create covers for London Underground's pocket Tube map. These free maps are one of the largest public art commissions in the UK, with millions of copies printed. More than 40 different designs have been produced, from a wide variety of British and international artists such as Rachel Whiteread, Yayoi Kusama, Tracey Emin and Daniel Buren.

=== Community maps ===
A map of Art on the Underground artwork locations was published in 2016 as the Art Map. The project has also generated maps within local communities such as a Brixton Mural Map in 2018 and the Brixton Botanical Map in 2022. These were available for free at tube stations as well as being published as PDFs for download online.

== See also ==
- Poems on the Underground
- MTA Arts & Design, the public art programme of the New York City Subway
