= Selective vehicle detection =

Bus priority system used by London Buses

Selective vehicle detection was the name of a bus priority system used by London Buses to allow traffic signals to selectively favour buses' movement through intersection by changing traffic light sequences and timings as buses approach.

Following a successful large-scale trial in 1987, London Transport began introducing selective vehicle detection to shorten red lights or extend green lights in the 1990s. This delivered journey time savings, as well as increased service reliability and reduced costs, as a smaller number of vehicles were required to deliver the same frequency. For example, it was estimated that route 15 could have a journey time 4 minutes shorter, due to the number of selective vehicle detection points passed. The system worked using 'bus detectors' either mounted on lampposts by the side of the road or ground loops, which detect transmission made by transmitters aboard buses.

Selective vehicle detection was replaced by the iBus system in the late 2000s which tracks all London's buses, allowing passengers to be provided with audio-visual announcements and improved information on bus arrivals, as well as triggering bus priority at traffic lights. iBus uses the Global Positioning System instead of physical roadside equipment. All buses in London were fitted with the iBus system by 2009.

== See also ==
- London iBus system
- Bus priority and bus lanes in London
