= List of Art on the Underground Tube map covers =

Since 2004, Art on the Underground has commissioned artists to create covers for London Underground's pocket Tube map. These free maps are one of the largest public art commissions in the UK. Over 40 different designs have been produced, with designs from a wide variety of British and international artists. Around 2 million maps are printed for each cover, down from a high of around 12 million in the early 2010s. In 2014, The Guardian published a pictorial survey of the first 10 years' designs, and The Londonist has a survey up to 2017. Between 2016 and 2018, there were also a series of covers for Night Tube.

== Tube map covers ==
No	Year	Month	Artist	Title
1	2004	August	Emma Kay	You Are in London
2	2005	June	Gary Hume	Untitled
3	2006	February	David Shrigley	Untitled
4		June	Yinka Shonibare	Global Underground Map
5	2007	January	Liam Gillick	The Day Before (You Know What They'll Call It? They'll Call it the Tube)
6		July	Jeremy Deller and Paul Ryan	Portrait of John Hough (TfL's longest serving member of staff - 45 years of service)
7	2008	January	Cornelia Parker	Underground Abstract
8		March	Mark Wallinger	Going Underground
9		October	Pae White	...fragment of a Magic Carpet, circa 1213
10	2009	March	Paul Noble	Untitled
11		September	Richard Long	Earth
12	2010	May	Barbara Kruger	Untitled (Tube Map)
13	2011	March	Eva Rothschild	Good Times
14		August	Michael Landy	All My Lines in the Palm of Your Hand
15		December	Yayoi Kusama	Polka Dots Festival
16	2012	June	Tracey Emin	The Central Line
17		December	Sarah Morris	Petrobas (Rio)
18	2013	May	Mona Hatoum	London: The World
19		December	Iman Qureshi	All Time Would Be Perpetual Spring
20	2014	May	Rachel Whiteread	The Hole of London 2014
21		December	Daniel Buren	From A Single One To Millions: Ink On Paper
22	2015	May	Pablo Bronstein	Design for a magnificent London Underground Grand Pendulum in gilt bronze
23	2016	January	Tomma Abts	Untitled
24		June	Hew Locke	Tunnel Vision
25		December	Gillian Carnegie	Metropolitan Diamonds
26	2017	June	Lily van der Stokker	Out Next Stop
27	2018	January	Marc Camille Chaimowicz	Untitled
28		May	Geta Brătescu	Game of Forms
29		December	Linder	The Bower of Bliss
30	2019	June	Laure Prouvost	You are deeper than what you think
31		December	Bedwyr Williams	Morden
32	2020	May	Elisabeth Wild	Fantasías
33		December	Phyllida Barlow	helter skelter
34	2021	September	Helen Cammock	sit alongside and feel me breathe
35	2022	January	Larry Achiampong	What I Hear I Keep
36		May	Joy Labinjo	Twist Out
37		November	Do Ho Suh	Routes/Roots: London
38	2023	May	Sharon Hayes	Come Out, Come Out
39		December	Joy Gregory	A Little Slice of Paradise
40	2024	November (Note: Due to the TfL cyber attack in September 2024, release of the 40th cover was delayed from September 2024 to November 2024, with the map labelled as September 2024)	Rita Keegan	The Fabric of Time
41	2025	July	Agnes Denes	Map Projections
42	2026	July	Ellen Gallagher	Fast-Fish and Loose-Fish

== Night Tube map covers ==
Between 2016 and 2018, there were also a series of covers for Night Tube.

No	Year	Month	Artist	Title
1	2016	December	Samara Scott	Night Tube Map Commission
2	2017	May	Pio Abad	Eddie
3		December	Marianna Simnett	Wing-sleepers
4	2018	May	Marie Jacotey	You in my bedroom
5		December	Jade Montserrat	hand this piece to one Jacob Aston West (b. approx. 1941–43, Montserrat)
