= CentreComm =

Coordinates: 51.503861°N 0.103702°W

CentreComm, first renamed as the NMCC (Network Management Control Centre) and again to SCC (Surface Control Centre) is Transport for London's emergency control room for London Buses. CentreComm's primary purpose is to provide an emergency control centre for London Buses contracted bus network. It is co-located with Transport for London's LSTCC centre which control London's traffic lights and traffic flow.

Should an incident require an emergency response such as road closures, accidents, robberies, theft, vandalism or assault; CentreComm would activate an emergency response such as calling the emergency services or diverting buses as appropriate.

CentreComm was conceived in 1979 and consisted of a mere handful of people equipped with two-way radios and paper records. In 2013 they had constant radio contact with all 8500 buses on the network via the iBus radio system. Through GPS fitted to each of London's buses they can monitor their location at all times.

CentreComm is in operation 24 hours a day 364 days a year, with Christmas Day being the only day it is closed.

For bus drivers, conductors and passenger assistants their services are activated via the IBus (London) system by initiating a code red (emergency) or code blue (information) call. For garage-based bus operator staff they are contacted via the telephone or by email.
