= London Buses =

Transport for London subsidiary for bus services

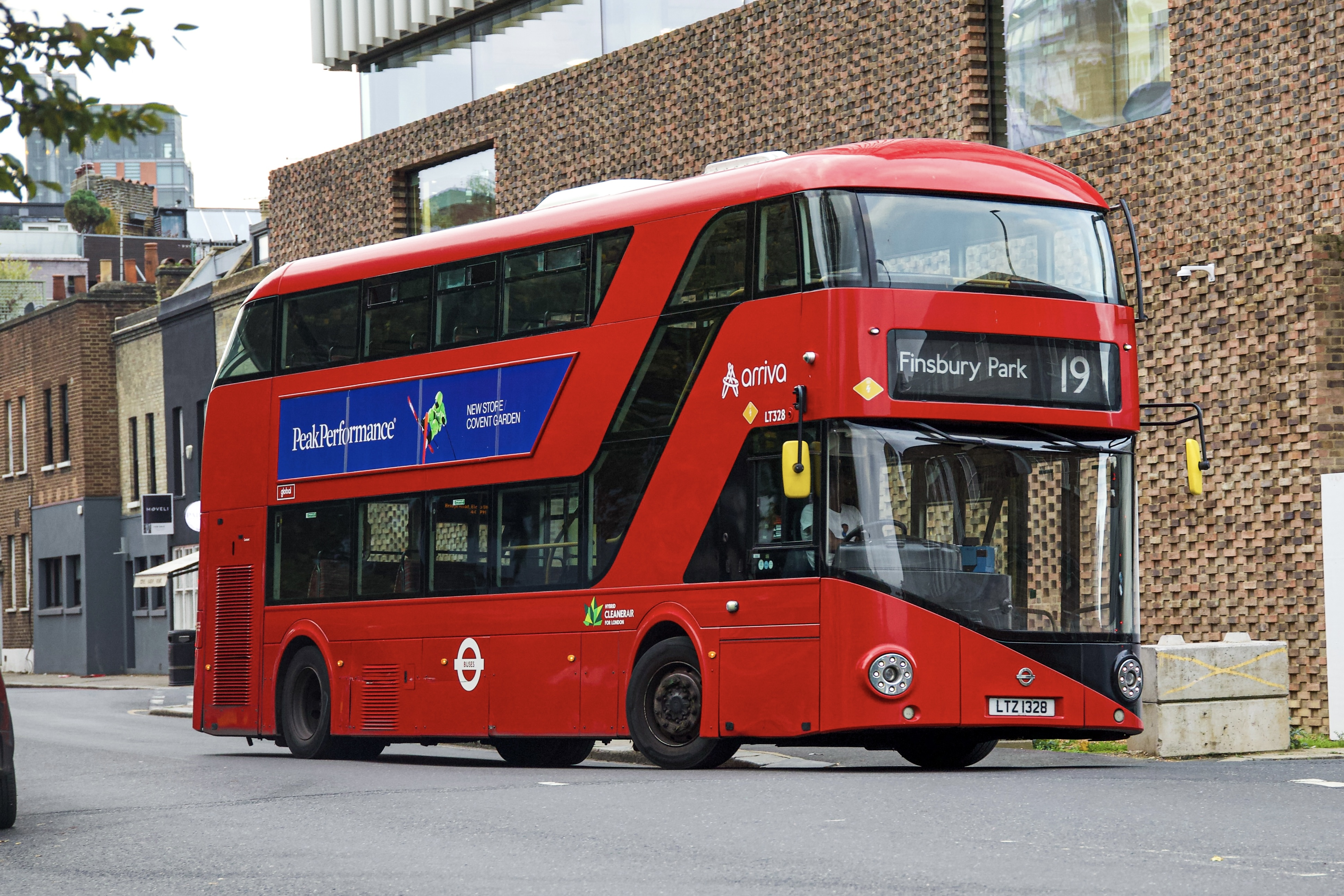
- New Routemaster on route 19 at Battersea
- Parent: Transport for London
- Founded: 11 November 1999
- Headquarters: London
- Service area: Greater London; Berkshire; Buckinghamshire; Essex; Hertfordshire; Kent; Surrey
- Service type: Bus transport network
- Routes: circa 670
- Stops: 19,607 (2023)
- Fleet: 8,982 (2026)
- Daily ridership: 5.7 million (2019/20)
- Fuel type: Diesel, Hybrid, Electric and Hydrogen fuel cell
- Website: tfl.gov.uk/modes/buses/

London Buses is the subsidiary of Transport for London (TfL) that manages most bus services in London, England. It was formed following the Greater London Authority Act 1999 that transferred control of London Regional Transport (LRT) bus services to TfL, controlled by the Mayor of London.

== Overview ==
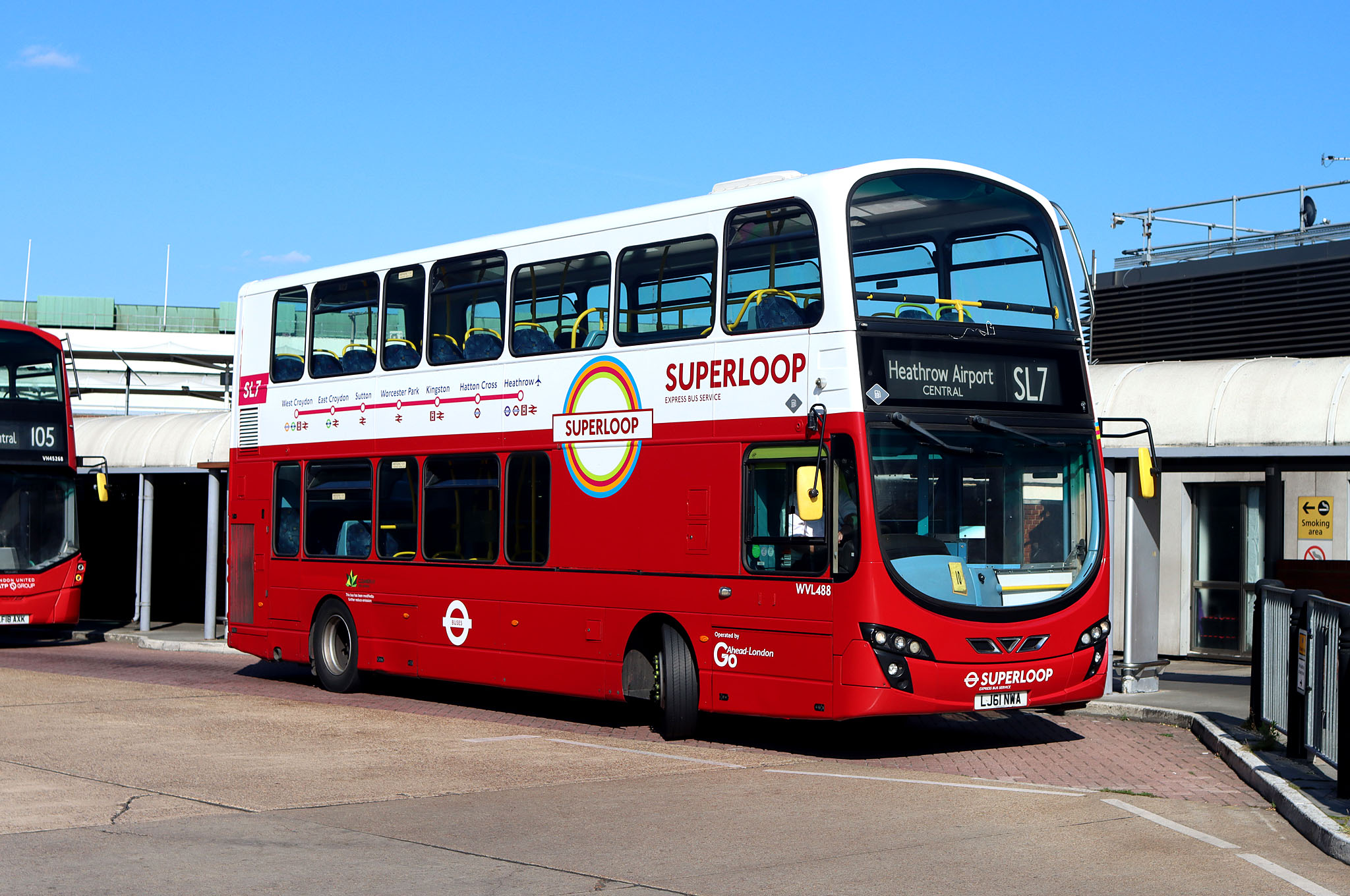
Go-Ahead London Volvo B9TL on route SL7 at Heathrow Airport in August 2023. It is currently the longest route in London Buses' network.

Transport for London's key areas of direct responsibility through London Buses are the following:

- planning new bus routes, and revising existing ones
- specifying service levels
- monitoring service quality
- management of bus stations and bus stops
- assistance in 'on ground' set up of diversions, bus driver assistance in situations over and above job requirements, for example Road Accidents
- providing information for passengers in the form of timetables and maps at bus stops and online, and an online route planning service
- producing leaflet maps, available from Travel Information Centres, libraries etc., and as online downloads.
- operating NMCC, London Buses' 24‑hour command-and-control centre based in Southwark

=== Bus operations ===
All bus operations are undertaken under a tendering system in which operators bid for routes in return for a set price per route operated. Until April 2022, contracts were normally for five years, with two-year extensions available if performance criteria were met. From April 2022, contracts will be for seven years with a performance based two year optional extension.

Routes are set up, controlled and tendered out by Transport for London (TfL) and they provide day to day assistance via CentreComm which coordinates a large scale network of Network Traffic Controllers to help with any traffic issues that may occur. Operators provide staff to drive the buses, provide the buses to operate and also adhere to set TfL guidelines. Operators are then in return paid per mile that each bus runs, the pricing is announced on new tenders.

=== Publications ===
London Buses publishes a variety of bus maps. In 2002, TfL introduced the first spider maps. Rather than attempting to cover the entire city, these maps are centred on a particular locality or bus station, and convey the route information in the schematic style of Harry Beck's influential Tube map, capitalising on TfL's iconic style of information design. The arachnoid form of bus routes radiating from a centre earned them the nickname spider maps, although TfL refer to them on their website as route maps. The maps are displayed at most major bus stops, and can be downloaded in PDF format via the Internet from the TfL website.

== Legal status ==
London Buses is the trading name of London Bus Services Limited (LBSL), a company established in 2000. It is a subsidiary of Transport for London.

There is also a separate company called London Buses Limited (LBL) that now runs the London Dial-a-Ride service. LBL was formed on 1 April 1985 as part of the privatisation of London bus services, and acted as an arm's-length subsidiary of TfL's precursor organisation, London Regional Transport (LRT), holding twelve bus operating units (from late 1988) and other assets. The operating units were sold off in 1994/95, and their purchasers make up the majority of companies awarded bus operating tenders from the current London Buses (LBSL). After 1994/95, the LBL company lay dormant, passing from LRT to TfL. It was resurrected when East Thames Buses was formed, separated by a Chinese wall from LBSL, and acted as a London bus operator by proxy.

== Scope ==
The local bus network in London is one of the largest and most comprehensive in the world. As of March 2024, 8,797 buses operate on over 670 different routes. In 2019/20, 2.09 billion passenger journeys were made.

== Fares and concessions ==
Buses in the London Buses network accept Travelcards, Oyster card products (including bus passes and Oyster pay as you go) and contactless debit and credit cards. Cash fares have not been available since 6 July 2014, but Day Bus passes (issued either as a single use Oyster card, or on paper from station ticket machines) were re-introduced on 2 January 2015. Single journey fares used to be charged in relation to length of journey (fare stages), but are now charged as single flat fares for any length of journey. From 2000, the flat fare was higher for journeys in Zone 1 than in outer zones, although from 2004 this difference was eliminated, the change coinciding with the introduction of Oyster card flat fares. As of 2025, the single fare is £1.75. In 2016, the hopper fare was introduced. This allows passengers to use any busses within 1 hour of touching in for no additional charge.

With Oyster pay as you go, users are charged a set amount for single journeys, although there is a "daily cap", which limits the maximum amount of money that will be deducted from the balance, regardless of how many buses are taken that day (from 04.30 to 04.29 the next day). Alternatively, weekly and monthly passes may also be purchased and loaded onto an Oyster card.

Passengers using contactless payment cards are charged the same fares as on Oyster pay as you go. Unlike Oyster cards, contactless cards also have a 7-day fare cap though it currently only operates on a Monday-Sunday basis.

Under 11s can travel free on London buses and trams at any time unaccompanied by an adult; they do not need an Oyster card or a ticket. Children aged 11 to 15 travel free on buses with an 11–15 Oyster photocard; without an Oyster card or Travelcard, they have to pay the full adult fare. Visitors can have a special discount added to an ordinary Oyster card at TfL's Travel Information Centres. There are also concessions for London residents aged 16 to 18.

The Freedom Pass scheme allows Greater London residents over state pension age, and those with a disability, to travel free at any time on buses and TfL's rail services. People who have concessionary bus passes issued by English local authorities travel free on TfL bus services at any time.

== Operators ==
=== Current ===
Bus services in London are operated by

- Arriva London
- Falcon Buses
- First Bus London
- Go-Ahead London
- Metroline
- Stagecoach London
- Transport UK London Bus
- Uno

=== Historic ===
- RATP Dev Transit London
- First London
- HCT Group
- Sullivan Buses
- Tower Transit

=== Future ===
- Buses for London (from 2027)

Each company has its own operating code, and every bus garage in London has its own garage code.

== Vehicles ==
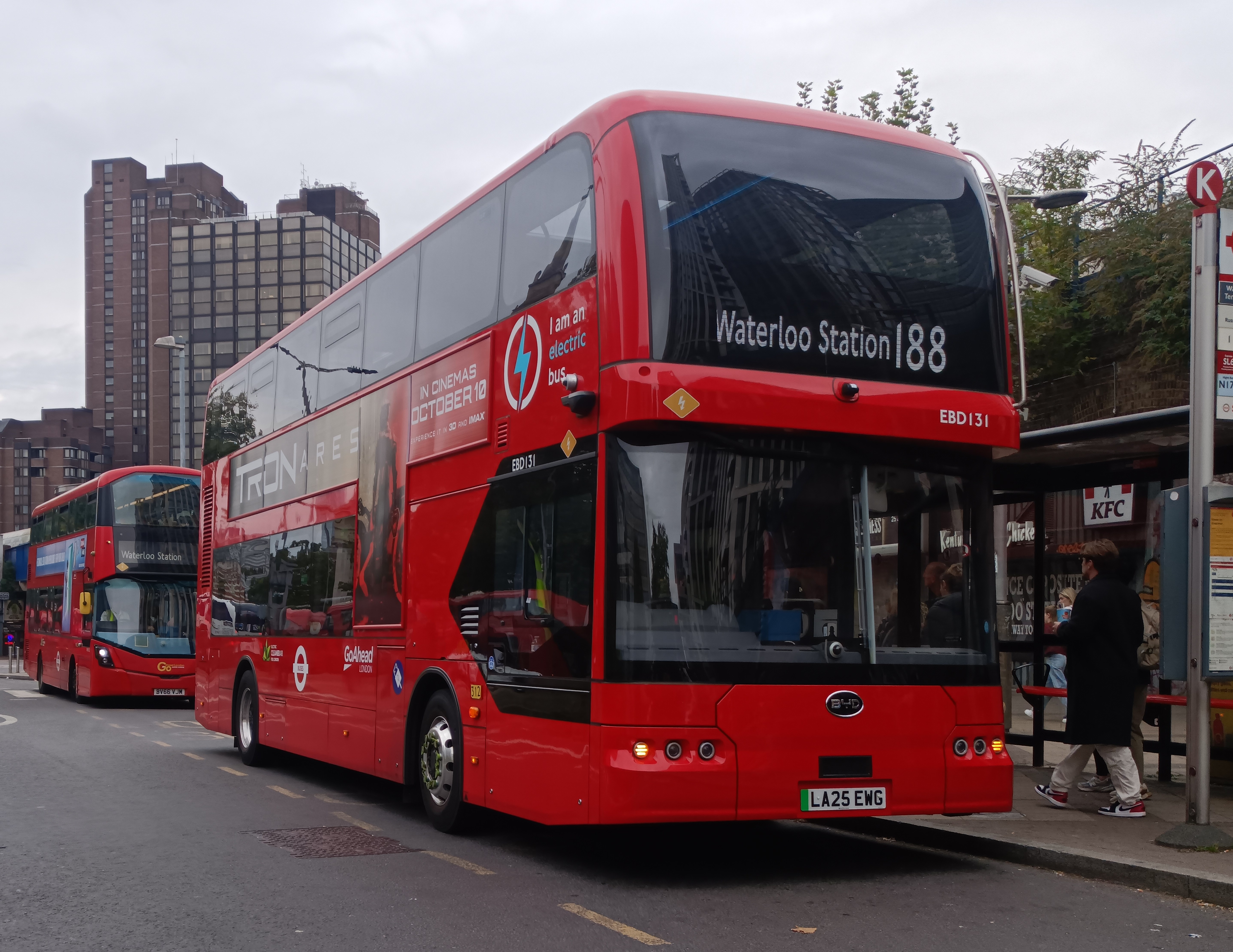
London Central BYD BD11 on route 188 at London Waterloo station in September 2025

As of March 2026, the London Buses fleet total of 8,982 buses includes 3,668 hybrid buses, 2,937 battery electric buses, and 20 hydrogen fuel cell buses. The zero emission fleet is the largest in Europe ahead of Moscow. All buses have been accessible and low floor since 2006, one of the first major cities in the world to achieve this.

The various bus operators providing services under contract to London Buses operate a wide variety of vehicles, about the only immediately obvious common feature being their use of a largely red livery, mandatory since 1997, as well as white-painted roofs featuring aerial roof markings to help cool down the bus during the summer, first introduced during 2006. For each bus route, London Buses sets a specification for buses to be used, with the choice of particular vehicle that meets the specification left up to the operator. Particular examples of London Buses specification include the use of separate exit doors (increasingly unusual on buses in the United Kingdom outside London) and, on double-deckers, the use of a straight staircase. Additionally, London Buses has previously specified that vehicles operating in London use traditional printed roller destination blinds, whereas in most other parts of the country, electronic dot matrix or LED displays are the norm on new buses.

Air conditioning is provided for the driver cab, and air cooling is provided on some buses. New electric single-decker buses use air conditioning with humidity extraction.

== iBus ==
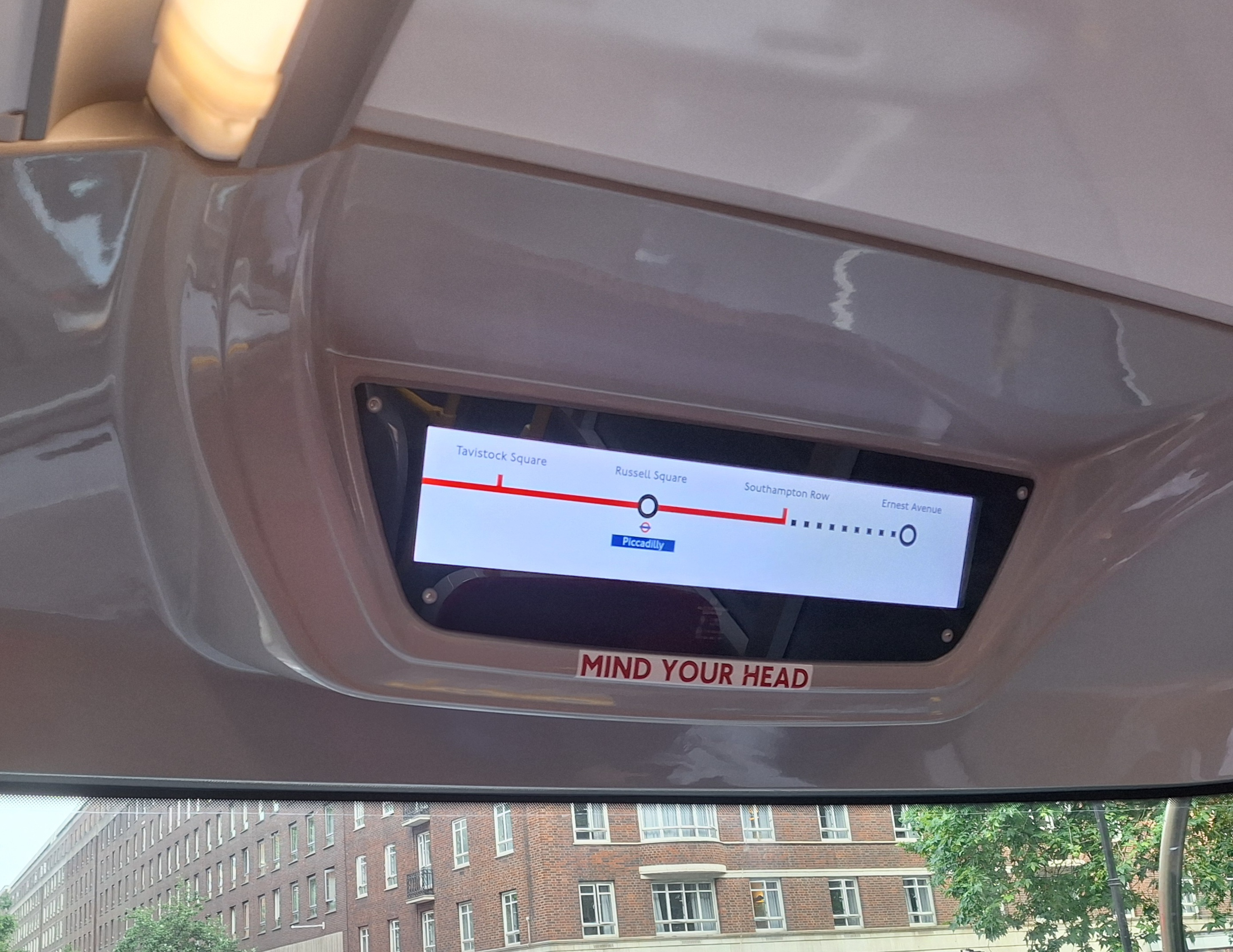
Newer iBus screen which shows upcoming stops on route 68

All of London's buses use the iBus system, an Automatic Vehicle Location system that provides passengers with audio visual announcements and is able to trigger priority at traffic junctions. The system was on trial in 2006, and was extended to all bus routes by 2009.
