= Tube map =

Schematic transport map of the London Underground network

The Tube map as of April 2026

The Tube map (sometimes called the London Underground map) is a schematic transport map of the lines, stations and services of the London Underground, known colloquially as "the Tube", hence the map's name. The first schematic Tube map was designed by Harry Beck in 1931. Since then, it has been expanded to include more of London's public transport systems, including the Docklands Light Railway, London Overground, the Elizabeth line, Tramlink, the London Cable Car and Thameslink.

As a schematic diagram, it shows not the geographic locations but the relative positions of the stations, lines, the stations' connective relations and fare zones. The basic design concepts have been widely adopted for other such maps around the world and for maps of other sorts of transport networks and even conceptual schematics.

A regularly updated version of the map is available from the official Transport for London website. In 2006, the Tube map was voted one of Britain's top 10 design icons which included Concorde, Mini, Supermarine Spitfire, K2 telephone box, World Wide Web and the AEC Routemaster bus. Since 2004, Art on the Underground has been commissioning artists to create covers for the pocket Tube map.

== History ==
=== Early maps ===
As London's early transport system was operated by a variety of independent companies, there were no complete maps of the network, just for the individual companies' routes. The maps were not typically schematic and were simply the line overlaid on a regular city map. There was no integration of the companies' services or any co-operation in advertising.

In 1907, The Evening News commissioned a pocket map, The Evening News London "Tube Map". It was the first map to show all of the lines with equal weight being given to each line, and it was the first map to use a different colour for each line.

Another early combined map was published in 1908 by the Underground Electric Railways Company of London (UERL) in conjunction with four other underground railway companies that used the "Underground" brand as part of a common advertising factor.

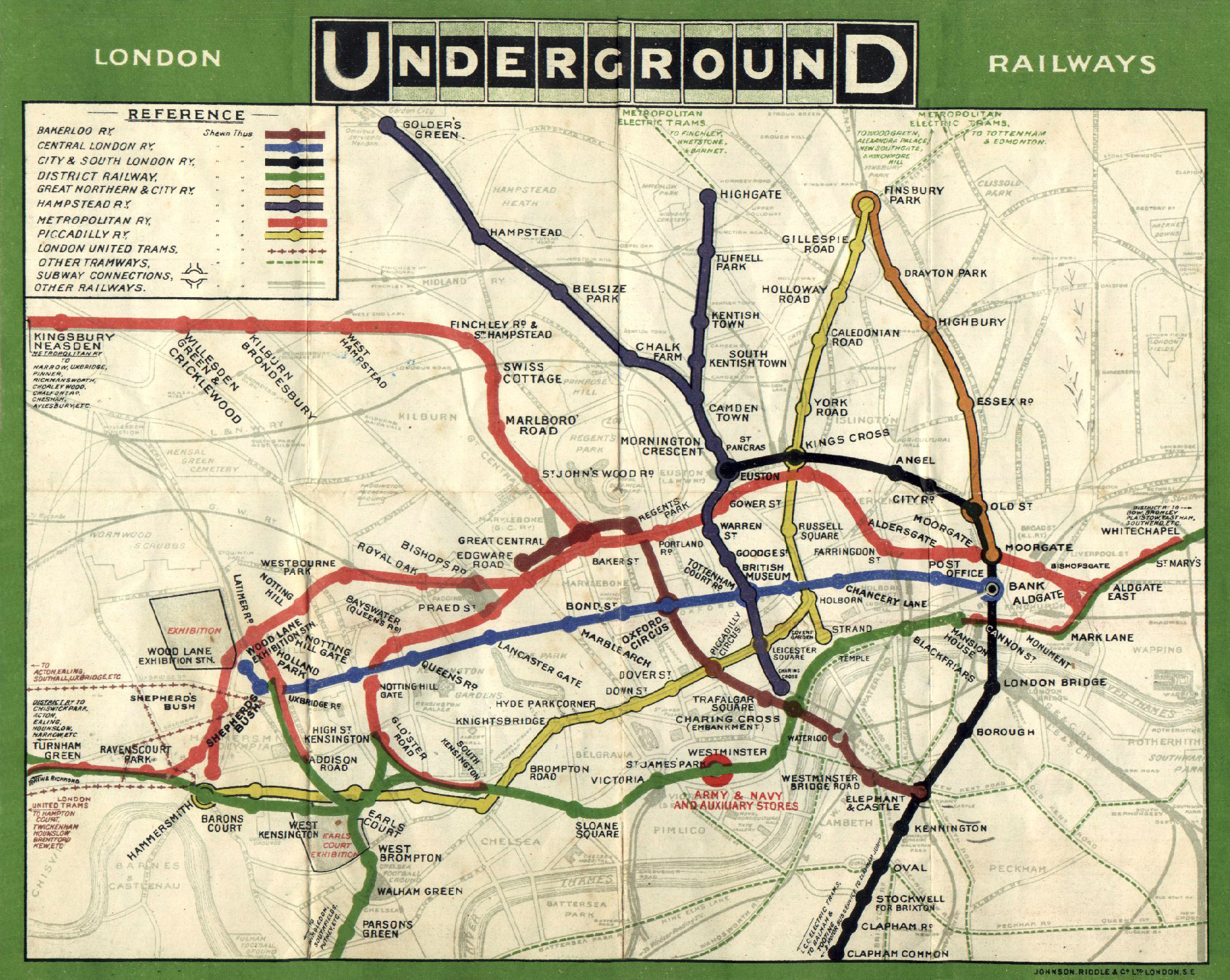
Map of Underground lines, 1908

The map showed eight routes – four operated by the UERL and one from each of the other four companies:

- UERL lines:
  - Bakerloo Railway – brown
  - Hampstead Railway – indigo
  - Piccadilly Railway – yellow
  - District Railway – green
- Other lines:
  - Central London Railway – blue
  - City and South London Railway – black
  - Great Northern and City Railway – orange
  - Metropolitan Railway – red

A geographical map presented restrictions since for sufficient clarity of detail in the crowded central area of the map required the extremities of the District and Metropolitan lines to be omitted and so a full network diagram was not provided. The problem of truncation remained for nearly half a century. Although all of the western branches of the District and Piccadilly lines were included for the first time in 1933 with Harry Beck's first proper Tube map, the portion of the Metropolitan line beyond Rickmansworth did not appear until 1938, and the eastern end of the District line did not appear until the mid-1950s.

The route map continued to be developed and was issued in various formats and artistic styles until 1920, when, for the first time, the geographic background detail was omitted in a map designed by MacDonald Gill. That freed the design to enable greater flexibility in the positioning of lines and stations. The routes became more stylised but the arrangement remained, largely, geographic in nature. The 1932 edition was the last geographic map to be published before Beck's diagrammatic map was introduced.

=== Beck's maps ===
Beck's map published in 1933

The first diagrammatic map of London's rapid transit network was designed by Harry Beck in 1931. He was a London Underground employee who realised that because the railway ran mostly underground, the physical locations of the stations were largely irrelevant to the traveller wanting to know how to get from one station to another; only the topology of the route mattered. That approach is similar to that of electrical circuit diagrams although they were not the inspiration for Beck's map. His colleagues pointed out the similarities, however, and he once produced a joke map with the stations replaced by electrical circuit symbols and names, with terminology such as "Bakerlite" for the Bakerloo line.

To that end, Beck devised a simplified map with stations, straight-line segments connecting them, and the River Thames; and lines running only vertically, horizontally, or on 45° diagonals. To make the map clearer and to emphasise connections, Beck differentiated between ordinary stations, marked with short ticks, and interchange stations, marked with diamonds. London Underground was initially sceptical of his proposal since it was an uncommissioned spare-time project and was tentatively introduced to the public in a small pamphlet in 1933. However, it immediately became popular, and the Underground has used topological maps to illustrate the network ever since.

The 1951 map had featured updated station names with an apostrophe added, like "St James's Park" and "Earl's Court", as opposed to the earlier version maps with station names like "St James' Park" and "Earls Court", as the apostrophes in the renamed stations were irregular until the revised 1954 map.

Despite the complexity of making the map, Beck was paid just ten guineas (equivalent to £650 in 2025) for the artwork and design of the card edition, and another five guineas (equivalent to £325 in 2025) for the poster. After its initial success, he continued to design the Tube map until 1960, a single (and unpopular) 1939 edition by Hans Schleger being the only exception. Meanwhile, as well as accommodating new lines and stations, Beck continually altered the design, such as changing the interchange symbol from a diamond to a circle and altering the line colours of the Central line from orange to red and of the Bakerloo line from red to brown. Beck's final design, in 1960, bears a strong resemblance to the current map. Beck lived in Finchley, North London, and a modified version of his first map is still preserved on the southbound platform at Finchley Central station, on the Northern line.

In 1997, Beck's importance was posthumously recognised, and as of 2022, this statement is printed on every Tube map: "This diagram is an evolution of the original design conceived in 1931 by Harry Beck".

=== After Beck ===
Unofficial map of fare zone 1 that shows the approximate geographic locations of the stations and lines. Note that this was before the Northern Line extension to Battersea Power Station, and the Elizabeth Line.

By 1960, Beck had fallen out with the Underground's publicity officer, Harold Hutchison, who was not a designer himself but drafted his own version of the Tube map that year. It removed the smoothed corners of Beck's design and created some highly cramped areas (most notably around Liverpool Street station), and the lines were generally less straight. However, Hutchison also introduced interchange symbols (circles for Underground-only, squares for connections with British Rail main line services) that were black and allowed multiple lines through them, as opposed to Beck, who used one circle for each line at an interchange, coloured according to the corresponding line.

In 1964, the design of the map was taken over by Paul Garbutt, who, like Beck, had produced a map in his spare time because of his dislike of the Hutchison design. Garbutt's map restored curves and bends to the diagram but retained Hutchison's black interchange circles, although squares were replaced with circles with a dot inside. Garbutt continued to produce Underground maps for at least another 20 years. Tube maps stopped bearing their designer's name in 1986, when the elements of the map then had a very strong resemblance to today's map. While the standard Tube map avoided representing most mainline services, a new variant of the map issued in 1973, the "London's Railways" map, was the first to depict Tube and above-ground mainline rail services in a diagrammatic style that closely matched Beck's designs. That version was created by Tim Demuth of the London Transport publicity office and was jointly sponsored by British Rail and London Transport. Demuth's map did not replace the standard Tube map but continued to be published as a supplementary resource, later known as the "London Connections" map.

=== Recent years ===
Some alterations have been made to the map over the years. More recent designs have incorporated changes to the network, such as the Docklands Light Railway and the extension to the Jubilee line. The map has also been expanded to include routes brought under Transport for London control such as TfL Rail and to note the Tube stops that connect with National Rail services, links to airports and River Services. In some cases, stations within short walking distance are now shown, often with the distance between them, such as Fenchurch Street's distance from Tower Hill (an evolution of the pedestrian route between Bank and Monument stations, which was once prominently marked on the map). Further, step-free access notations are also incorporated in the current map. In addition, the fare zones have been added to help passengers judge the cost of a journey. One of the major changes to be made to the revision of the Tube map put out in September 2009 was the removal of the River Thames. The river had been omitted from official maps on several previous occasions (for example, according to David Leboff and Tim Demuth's book, in 1907, 1908 and 1919), and from 1921 it was absent for several years on pocket maps designed by MacDonald Gill. The Thames-free 2009 version was the first time that the river did not appear on the Tube map since the Stingemore pocket map of 1926. The latest removal resulted in widespread international media attention, and general disapproval from most Londoners as well as from the then Mayor of London, Boris Johnson. Based on the reaction, the following edition of the diagram in December 2009 reinstated both the river and fare zones.

In more recent years, TfL has expanded its rail services, notably with the expansion of the London Overground network, which has taken over a number of National Rail lines and brought them into the TfL network, each of them being converted lines being added to the Tube map. Further additions have been made such as the London Cable Car and the boundaries of fare zones. Some commentators have suggested that Beck's design should be replaced with a new design that can incorporate the new lines more comfortably.

=== Pocket map covers ===
Since 2004, Art on the Underground has commissioned various British and international artists to create a cover for the pocket map. These free maps are one of the largest public art commissions in the UK, with millions of copies printed. Over 40 different designs have been produced, from a wide variety of British and international artists such as Rachel Whiteread, Yayoi Kusama, Tracey Emin and Daniel Buren.

== Technical aspects ==
The designers of the map have tackled a variety of problems in showing information as clearly as possible and have sometimes adopted different solutions.

The font for the map, including station names, is Johnston, which uses perfect circles for the letter 'O'. That is historic and the generic font for all TfL uses from station facades to bus destination blinds.

=== Line colours ===
The table below shows the changing use of colours since Beck's first map. The current colours are taken from Transport for London's colour standards guide, which defines the precise colours from the Pantone palette and also a colour naming scheme that is particular to TfL. Earlier maps were limited by the number of colours available that could be clearly distinguished in print. Improvements in colour printing technology have reduced that problem and the map has coped with the identification of new lines without great difficulty.

Line	TfL colour reference	Shown as							
Line	TfL colour reference	Notes							
Bakerloo	Pantone 470	brown 1934–present	red 1933–1934						brown UERL
Central	Corporate Red; Pantone 485	red 1934–present	orange 1933–1934						blue UERL
Circle	Corporate Yellow; Pantone 116	yellow 1987–present	yellow (black outline) 1949–1987	green (black outline) 1948	originally part of the Metropolitan and District lines; Not shown as a separate line until 1949				
District	Corporate Green; Pantone 356	green 1933–present							green UERL
Hammersmith & City	Pantone 197	pink 1990–present	maroon 1948–1988	green 1937–1948	maroon 1934–1937				
Hammersmith & City	Pantone 197	pink 1990–present	part of the Metropolitan line until 1990						
Jubilee	Corporate Grey; Pantone 430	grey 1979–present	opened 1979; Baker Street to Stanmore section previously part of the Bakerloo line						
Metropolitan	Pantone 235	maroon 1948–present	green 1937–1948	maroon 1934–1937	shown combined with the District line 1937–1948				red UERL
Northern	Corporate Black; Pantone Black	black 1933–present	Originally two separate lines, combined at Camden Town and Kennington in 1924 and 1926 respectively						grey (CCE&H) UERL
Northern	Corporate Black; Pantone Black	black 1933–present	Originally two separate lines, combined at Camden Town and Kennington in 1924 and 1926 respectively						black (C&SL) UERL
Piccadilly	Corporate Blue; Pantone 072	dark blue 1933–present							yellow (black outline) UERL
Victoria	Pantone 299	light blue 1968–present	opened 1968						
Waterloo & City	Pantone 338	turquoise 1994–present	white (black outline) 1949–1994	red (black outline) 1943–1948	white (black outline) 1938–1941	not shown before 1938			thin grey (main line) UERL
Waterloo & City	Pantone 338	turquoise 1994–present	part of British Rail until 1994						
Docklands; Light; Railway	Pantone 326	turquoise (double stripe) 1993–present	blue (double stripe) 1987–1993	opened 1987					
Tramlink	Pantone 368	green (double stripe) 2017–present	Opened 2000, not shown on the standard map until 2017						
Elizabeth line	Pantone 266	Purple (double stripe) 2022–present	blue (double stripe) 2015–2022		Not shown before 2015				thin grey (main line) UERL
Elizabeth line	Pantone 266		Paddington to Heathrow/Reading and Liverpool Street to Shenfield sections shown as TfL Rail before completion of Central Section		Not shown before 2015				thin grey (main line) UERL
Liberty line	Pantone 6215	dark grey (double stripe) 2024–present	orange (double stripe) 2015–Autumn 2024	not shown before 2015					
Liberty line	Pantone 6215	now part of London Overground		not shown before 2015					
Lioness line	Pantone 2012	light orange (double stripe) 2024–present	orange (double stripe) 2007–2024	not shown 1985–2007	white (black outline) 1984	brown (triple stripe) 1975–1983	brown/black/brown (triple stripe) 1973–1974		thin grey (main line) UERL
Lioness line	Pantone 2012	now part of London Overground		not shown 1985–2007	only Queen's Park–Watford shown 1973–1984 (Bakerloo peak hours service)				thin grey (main line) UERL
Mildmay line	Pantone 2383	blue (double stripe) 2024–present	orange (double stripe) 2007–2024	white (black outline) c.2000–2007	not shown 1943–2000	white (black outline) 1938–1941			thin grey (main line) UERL
Mildmay line	Pantone 2383	now part of London Overground		white (black outline) c.2000–2007	not shown 1943–2000	white (black outline) 1938–1941			thin grey (main line) UERL
Suffragette line	Pantone 6171	green (double stripe) 2024–present	orange (double stripe) 2007–2024	not shown before 2007					thin grey (main line) UERL
Suffragette line	Pantone 6171	now part of London Overground		not shown before 2007					thin grey (main line) UERL
Weaver line	Pantone 689	maroon (double stripe) 2024–present	orange (double stripe) 2015– 2024	not shown before 2015					thin grey (main line) UERL
Weaver line	Pantone 689	now part of London Overground		not shown before 2015					thin grey (main line) UERL
Windrush line	Pantone 1795	red (double stripe) 2024–present	orange (double stripe) 2010–2024	orange 1990–2010	maroon (double stripe) 1970–c.1990	maroon 1948–1969	green 1937–1948	maroon 1934–1937	white (red outline) 1933–1934
Windrush line	Pantone 1795	now part of London Overground, was formerly the East London line of London Underground until 2007, shown as part of the Metropolitan line until 1985							
Thameslink	Pantone 252	pink (dashed line) 2020–present	white (black outline) c.1990–1998	orange (double stripe) 1985-c.1990	white (black outline) 1977–1984				thin grey (main line) UERL
Thameslink	Pantone 252	part of National Rail; not shown between 1998 and 2020							thin grey (main line) UERL
London Cable Car	Pantone 186	red (triple stripe) 2012–present	Opened 2012						
Northern City	none	white (black outline) c.1990–1998	orange (double stripe) 1985-c.1990	white (black outline) 1975–1984	black (double stripe) 1970–1975	black 1937–1969	white (black outline) 1934–1937	white (maroon outline) 1933–1934	orange (black outline) UERL
Northern City	none	not shown since 1998; transferred to British Rail (now National Rail) in 1975							

Pecked lines have at various times indicated construction, limited service, or sections closed for renovation.

=== Station marks ===
From the start, interchange stations were given a special mark to indicate their importance, but its shape has changed over the years. In addition, since 1960, marks were used to identify stations that offered connections with British Rail (now National Rail). The following shapes have been used:

- Circle (one for each line or station, where convenient) – standard default mark
- Circle (one for each station) – 1938 experimental map
- Diamond (one for each line) – early 1930s
- Square – interchange with British Railways, 1960–1964
- Circle with a dot inside – interchange with British Rail, 1964–1970

Since 1970 the map has used a reversed (red on white) British Rail "double arrow" beside the station name to indicate main line interchanges. Where the main line station has a different name from the Underground station that it connects with, since 1977 this has been shown in a box. The distance between the Tube station and the main line station is now shown.

Contemporary maps have marked stations offering step-free access with a blue circle containing a wheelchair symbol in white.

Stations with links to airports (Heathrow Terminals 2 & 3, Terminal 4, and Terminal 5 for Heathrow Airport and the DLR station at City Airport) are shown with a black aeroplane symbol.

Since 2000, stations with a nearby interchange to river bus piers on the Thames have been marked with a small boat symbol to promote London River Services.

When Eurostar services used Waterloo International, the Eurostar logo was shown next to Waterloo station. In November 2007, the terminus was transferred to St Pancras International.

=== Lines or services ===
The Tube map aims to make the complicated network of services easy to understand, but it is not possible to have complete information about the services that operate on each line.

Limited-service routes have sometimes been identified with hatched lines, with some complications added to the map to show where peak-only services ran through to branches such as that to Chesham on the Metropolitan line. The number of routes with a limited service has declined in recent years, as patronage has recovered from its early-1980s low. As there are now fewer restrictions to show, most of the remaining ones are now indicated in the accompanying text, rather than by special line markings.

=== Official versions ===
The Tube map exists to help passengers navigate the London rapid transit network, and whether it should play a wider role in helping people navigate London itself has been questioned. The question has been raised as to whether mainline railways should be shown on the map, particularly those in Inner London. The Underground has largely resisted adding additional services to the standard Tube map and instead produces separate maps with different information, including:

- Standard Tube map: Shows all Underground, London Overground, DLR, Elizabeth line, Tramlink and Thameslink routes and stations, and fare zones.
- Large print Tube map: As above but with larger print.
- Walking distance map: Shows walking times between stations in the central London area.
- Toilet facilities map: Shows toilet facilities at stations.
- Bikes on trains map: Shows which routes allow bicycles to be taken on trains during peak times.
- Night Tube map: Shows Night Tube services.
- Step-free Tube Guide: Shows which stations have lifts, escalators or ramps to platforms.
- Tube Map Showing Tunnels: Shows sections of lines that are in tunnel. Designed to help users with claustrophobia or other anxiety conditions.
- London Connections map: Produced by the Association of Train Operating Companies (ATOC), this provided the same information as TfL's London fare zones map but extended further beyond fare zones 7–9. National Rail lines were emphasised by thicker lines and coloured according to their train operating company (TOC). This map was replaced by the Oyster Rail Services map.

Maps are produced in different sizes, the most common being Quad Royal (40 × 50 inches) poster size and Journey Planner pocket size. The maps showing all the National Rail routes provide useful additional information at the expense of considerably increased complexity, as they contain almost 700 stations.

=== Non-London Underground lines on standard map ===
Some non-Underground lines have appeared on the standard tube map:

- On the early maps that used a geographic background, mainline railways were shown as part of the background detail.
- Prior to its transfer to the London Underground in 1994, the Waterloo & City line was operated by British Rail and its mainline predecessors but has appeared on most Tube maps since the mid-1930s.
- For a short period in the late 1930s to 1940, the section of the West London line linking Willesden Junction to the Metropolitan line's Middle Circle route at Uxbridge Road was shown as a service operated by the Great Western Railway and the London, Midland and Scottish Railway. The service was removed when the line closed to passengers in 1940. This section of the line is today shown as part of the London Overground.
- The North London line was added to the map in 1977. Although run by British Rail and later by Silverlink, it was shown in British Rail/National Rail colours, but its appearance was intermittent and was omitted from some map editions over the years. In November 2007, the line was taken over by London Overground and changed to an orange double stripe. The semi-orbital route originally ran from Richmond to Broad Street and later Richmond to North Woolwich. The line runs now from Richmond to Stratford.
- The West London line, Watford DC line and Gospel Oak to Barking line (former British Rail/Silverlink lines) were all added to the standard map in 2007, when they were taken over by London Overground, and all are shown as an orange double stripe.
- The Northern City Line appeared on the original 1908 map as the Great Northern and City Railway. It later appeared as the Great Northern and City section of the Metropolitan Railway and then, from the late 1930s as part of the Northern line. The service was transferred to British Rail in 1975 and continued to appear until recently.
- Thameslink reopened in 1988 after it had been closed for many years. It offers some relief to the Northern line, as it connects King's Cross St Pancras to London Bridge. Only the central sections between Kentish Town and London Bridge/Elephant & Castle were shown. Its appearance on Tube maps had been intermittent since it had been omitted from some map editions over the years, before it was re-added to the official tube map in December 2020.
- The Docklands Light Railway, the automatic light rail system in the London Docklands area.
- The London Cable Car, linking Greenwich Peninsula and Royal Docks across the Thames, was added in December 2011.
- The first section of the Crossrail franchise, TfL Rail, was added in May 2015.
- Also in May 2015, the Chingford line, Enfield & Cheshunt line, and Romford–Upminster line were added to the London Overground network on the tube map.
- Tramlink, shown in 2016 as London Trams, was included on the map from June 2016.
- The Elizabeth line was added to the map in May 2022.

When Transport for London expanded its London Overground service to include the East London line in 2010, the East London line, extended to Croydon, changed from a solid orange line to a double orange stripe. According to 2007 proposals, the addition of the South London line to London Overground was supposed to cause the southern loop to be added to future Tube maps in late 2010, and, as of May 2013, it is up and running.

=== London Underground lines on geographically-accurate maps ===
Like many other rapid transit maps, because the Tube map ignores geography, it may not accurately depict the relative orientation and distance between stations.

Transport for London formerly published several bus maps that depicted the approximate paths of tube routes relative to major streets and London bus routes. The maps also show locations of certain cultural attractions and geographic landmarks.

Internet mapping services such as Google Maps offer a "Transit Layer" showing actual routes superimposed on the standard street map. A map shows Underground, London Overground, Elizabeth line, DLR lines and National Rail stations within Zone 1–2.

== Spin-offs and imitations ==
A London Buses "spider map" on display next to a Tube map at Waterloo Station

Google Doodle in January 2013 (150th anniversary of the Tube)

A Wikimedia schematic version of the Tube map. The locations of lines and stations are not geographically accurate.

The 'look' of the London Underground map (including 45° angles, evenly-spaced 'stations' and some geographic distortion) has been emulated by many other underground railway systems around the world. While London Underground have been protective of their copyright they have also allowed their concepts to be shared with other transport operators (Amsterdam's GVB even pays tribute on its map).

The success of the Tube map as a piece of information design has led to many imitations of its format. What is probably the earliest example is the Sydney Suburban and City Underground railway map of 1939. It follows Beck's styling cues, and in size, design and layout, it is nearly a clone of the London map of the late 1930s, right down to the use of the Underground roundel.

In 2002, Transport for London launched a series of London Buses "spider diagrams" to display at bus stops around the city, conveying bus route information in a schematic style similar to Beck's design, with straight lines and 45° angles depicting geographically distorted bus routes, coloured lines and numbers to differentiate services, and graphical markers to show bus stops. Tube and rail lines are not included, but interchanges are denoted with appropriate symbols by bus stop names, such as the Tube roundel. Unlike the traditional Tube map, the bus maps display services appropriate to specific transport hubs rather than a full network. Each map also contains a central rectangle of a simple geographically accurate street map to display the positions of bus stops; outside the rectangle, the only geographic feature to appear on the bus maps is the River Thames. The maps are also available for electronic download, with map collections ordered by London borough councils. The bus maps were designed for TfL by the cartographic design company T-Kartor group.

An isochrone map of the network was made available in 2007.

In 2009, British Waterways produced a map of London's waterways in a Tube-style diagrammatic map, depicting the River Thames, the various canals and subterranean rivers in the city.

Attempts to create alternative versions to the official Tube map have continued. In June 2011, the British designer Mark Noad unveiled his vision for a more 'geographically accurate' London Underground map. The map is an attempt to see if it is possible to create a geographically accurate representation of the Underground system and still retain some of the clarity of Beck's original diagram. It uses similar principles, fixed-line angles (30° and 60°, instead of 45°) and shortens the extremities of the lines to make it more compact. In 2013, Dr Max Roberts, a psychology lecturer at the University of Essex with a particular interest in usability, information design and schematic mapping, issued his own version of the Tube map. His design, based on a series of concentric circles, emphasised the concept of the newly completed orbital loop surrounding Central London with radial lines. A map created to illustrate Tube-related articles on Wikipedia in 2014 was praised for its clarity and for including future developments such as Crossrail.

In July 2015, a map of the network displaying walking calorie burn information for each leg was published by Metro newspaper.

=== Cultural references ===
The design has become so widely known that it is now instantly recognisable as representing London. It has been featured on T-shirts, postcards and other memorabilia. In 2006, the design came second in a televised search for the most well-known British design icon. It is widely cited by academics and designers as a 'design classic', and those cultural associations make London Underground not usually permit the design to be used or altered for any other purpose. That has been officially sanctioned only on a few occasions:

- David Booth's The Tate Gallery by Tube (1986) is one of a series of publicity posters for the Underground. His work showed the lines of the map squeezed out of tubes of paint (with the name of the gallery's nearest station, Pimlico, on a paint-tube) and has since been used on the cover of the pocket map.
- In Tate Modern hangs The Great Bear by Simon Patterson, a subtle parody of the contemporary map design, first displayed in 1992 in which the station names on the Tube map have been replaced by those of famous figures.
- In 2003, to coincide with the publication of a book about tube maps from all over the world, the London Transport Museum released a "World Metro Map" poster that was strongly based on the London diagram and approved by TfL.
- The shape of a pig seen in the lines of the London Underground map, from Paul Middlewick's Animals on the Underground
  Animals on the Underground is a collection of over 20 animal characters depicted using only lines, stations and interchange symbols on the London Underground map, created by illustrator Paul Middlewick in 1987. In 2003, the concept was used in a poster campaign by advertising agency McCann-Erickson to promote the London Zoo. In May 2010, a children's storybook was released that used the characters, "Lost Property". It is the story of an elephant called "Elephant & Castle" who loses his memory and is helped by Angel the angel fish. The book was illustrated by Middlewick and written by Jon Sayers, and its official launch took place at the London Transport Museum.
- Albus Dumbledore, a central character in the Harry Potter series, has a scar just above his left knee that is in the shape of a Tube map.
- In 2006, The Guardian published a design based on the tube map, purporting to show the relationships between musicians and musical genres in the 20th century.
- On 11 January 2007, Lord Adonis unveiled a depiction of the map featuring the names of successful schools and students at GCSE level as part of the London Student Awards 2007.
- The Royal Shakespeare Company produced a map in 2007 linking Shakespearean characters according to their traits in a diagram that resembles the map for complexity.
- The game development studio Dinosaur Polo Club created the game Mini Metro, whose main mechanic is to efficiently connect stations in a strict Harry Beck style.

Stylistic aspects of the London diagram, such as the line colours and styles and the station ticks or interchange symbols, are also frequently used in advertising.

== See also ==
- Paris Métro map
- New York City Subway map
