= Larry Achiampong =

British Ghanaian artist (born 1984)

- Born: 1984 (age 41–42); London, England
- Citizenship: United Kingdom and Ghana
- Education: Slade School of Fine Art
- Occupation: Artist
- Website: www.larryachiampong.co.uk

Larry Achiampong (born 1984) is a British Ghanaian artist whose work includes moving image; sculptural installation; photographic and painted collage; audio and visual archives; live performance; spoken word; recorded sound bytes and composed scores. Recurring themes within these works often explore postcolonial themes and the idea of a post-human existence.

He is known for his major public commissions for Somerset House and Transport for London. Both works focus on Pan-African histories and futures with a thematic focus on the ideas of Pan-Africanism in the form of flags and colour representation. He is currently represented by Copperfield Gallery, London.

== Selected solo shows ==
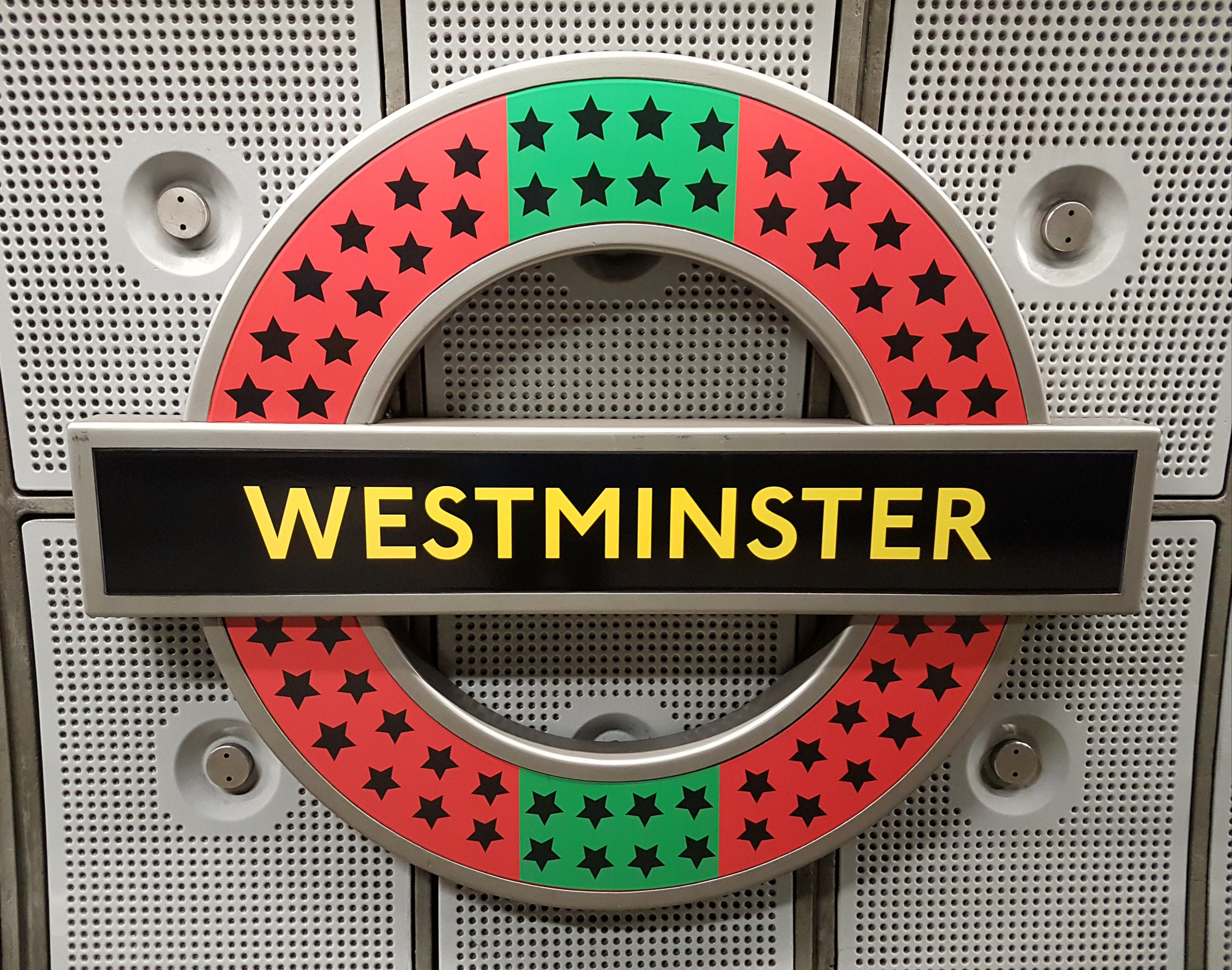
One of Achiampong's alternative roundels at Westminster tube station

- 2016: Larry Achiampong: Open Season (Logan Center, University of Chicago, Chicago)
- 2020: When the Sky Falls (John Hansard Gallery, Southampton)
- 2022: Wayfinder (Turner Contemporary)

=== Public commissions ===
- 2017: Pan African Flag for the Relic Travellers' Allicance (Ascension) – flag commission (Somerset House)
- 2019–2020: Art on The Underground: Westminster Station Commission – (Art on the Underground/Transport for London)
- 2022: Pan African Flag for the Relic Travellers' Alliance (Union) – permanent roundel at Westminster Underground Station

== Filmography ==
=== Feature film ===
Year	Title	Role	Ref(s)
2022	Wayfinder	Director, producer, writer, cinematographer, composer	

== Influences ==
Edge thought that his portraits of video game characters in his 2023 exhibition at Frieze London "countered the negative stereotypes that dog Black characters" within videogames. For example, Edge noted that his portrait depicting John Marston as Black "addresses the misrepresentation of cowboys in fiction" since one out of four cowboys was not white (although this is rarely presented in traditional media).
