= Harry Beck =

British graphic designer (1902–1974)

- Born: Henry Charles Beck; 4 June 1902; Leyton, Essex, England
- Died: 18 September 1974 (aged 72); Southampton, England
- Education: Grove House School, Highgate
- Occupations: Electrical designer, artist
- Known for: Tube map
- Spouse: Nora Beck (m. 1933)
- Parent(s): Joshua and Eleanor Louisa Beck

Henry Charles Beck (4 June 1902 – 18 September 1974), commonly known as Harry Beck, was an English technical draughtsman who created the first diagrammatic Tube map for the London Underground in 1931. Beck drew the diagram after being laid off by the Signalling Department of Underground Electric Railways of London.

Although his design was initially rejected, the Publicity Office of London Transport changed their minds after Beck resubmitted an updated copy. The map was first issued as a pocket edition in January 1933 and was immediately popular. The Underground has used topological maps to illustrate the network ever since. Harry Beck wanted to make the network easier to understand by colouring each train route and using only straight lines and 45 degree angles.

== Biography ==
Henry Charles Beck was born on 4 June 1902 at 14 Wesley Road, in Leyton, Essex, to Eleanor Louisa Beck (née Crouch) and Joshua Beck. He was brought up in Highgate and educated there at Grove House School, a boys' private school. He started his career in the 1920s as an engineering draughtsman with the London Underground Signals Office, where he primarily worked on schematics for electrical systems.

In 1931, while unemployed, he developed his simplified map of the London Underground system, which was initially rejected but later accepted. On 16 September 1933 he married Nora Beck, at St Michael and All Angels' church parish church in Mill Hill, Middlesex. They had no children. In 1947 he began teaching typography and colour design at the London School of Printing and Kindred Trades, where he remained until retirement. He died in Southampton, Hampshire on 18 September 1974.

== London Underground map ==
=== Before Beck ===
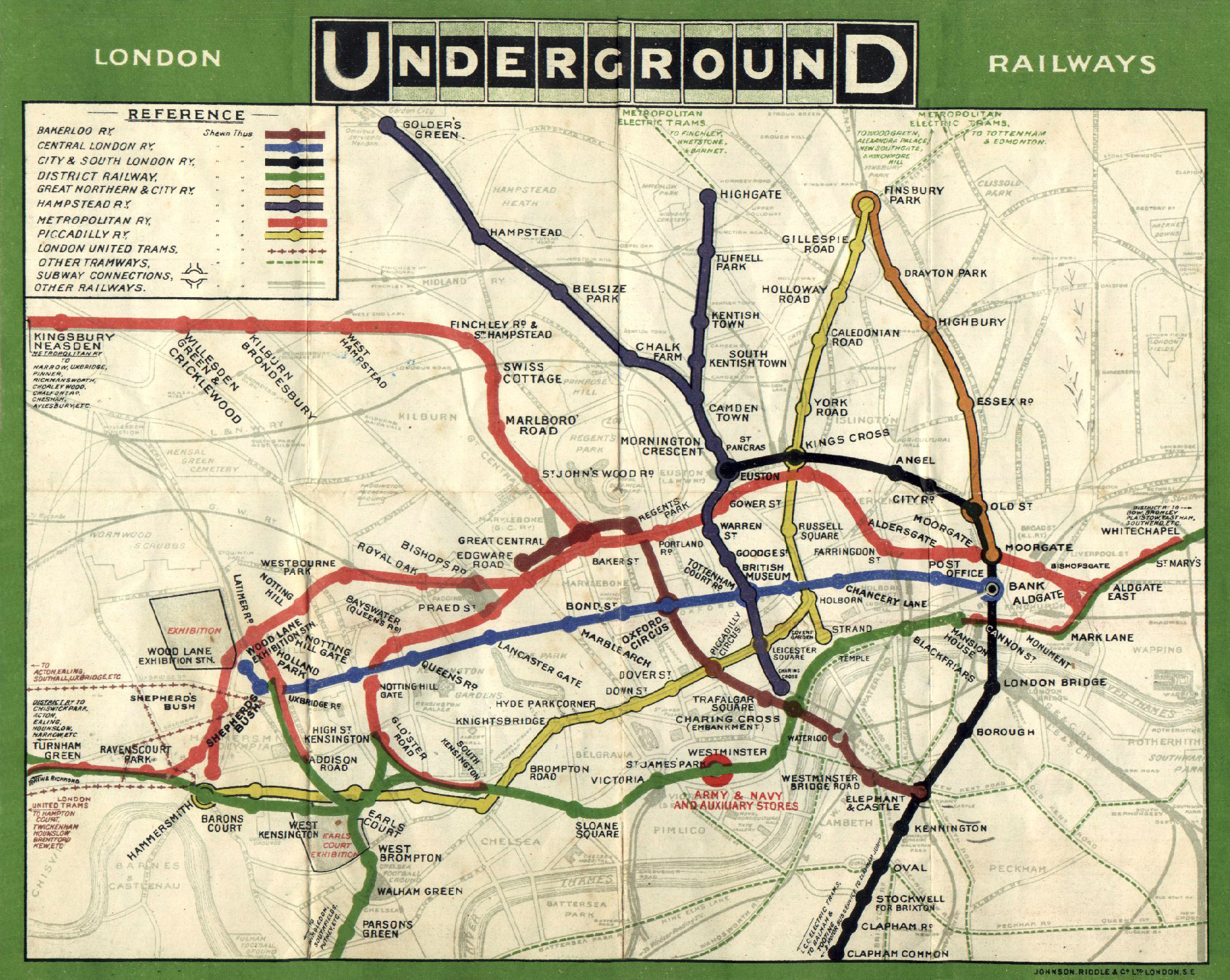
Map of underground lines, 1908

Before the Beck diagram (the underground map that he created), the various underground lines had been laid out geographically, often superimposed over the roadway of a city map. This meant the centrally located stations were shown very close together and the out-of-town stations spaced far apart. From around 1909 a new type of 'map' appeared inside the train cars; it was a non-geographic linear diagram, in most cases a simple straight horizontal line, which equalized the distances between stations.

By the late 1920s most Underground lines and some mainline (especially LNER) services displayed these, many of which had been drawn by George Dow. Some writers and broadcasters have speculated that Dow's maps partly inspired Beck's work. The geographical-based map, used immediately before Beck's, in 1932, was produced by the underground map designer for the period 1926–1932, F. H. Stingemore. It was Stingemore's idea to slightly expand the central area of the map for ease of reading.

=== Beck's concept ===
Beck's Underground Map of 1933

Beck had the idea of creating a full system map in colour. He believed that Underground passengers were not concerned with geographical accuracy and were more interested in how to get from one station to another and where to change trains. While drawing an electrical circuit diagram, Beck came up with a new idea for a map, based on the concept of an electrical schematic in which all the stations were more-or-less equally spaced rather than a geographic map. Beck first submitted his idea to Frank Pick of London Underground in 1931, but it was considered too radical as it did not show relative distances. The Publicity department rejected the design at first, but the designer persisted. So, after a successful trial of 500 copies in 1932, distributed via a few stations, the map was first fully published in 1933 (700,000 copies). The positive reaction from customers proved it was a sound design, and a large reprint was required after only one month.

Degani (2013) has suggested that one of the configuration techniques employed by Beck was that of an "underlying grid". In some cases the vertical and horizontal grid units are equalised, but on the whole the grid is rectilinear. The result is a "relaxed grid ... which has a certain rhythm and charm – somewhat similar to the grid used by modern artists (e.g. Piet Mondrian's painting Composition with Red, Blue and Yellow, 1937–42.)"

=== The map after Beck ===
The modern Tube map, based on the simplified topological design invented by Beck

Beck tried to regain control of the map through threatening legal action, but in 1965 he abandoned the attempt, "bitter and betrayed by the very organisation he had helped, so admirably, to promote." In 1997, Beck's importance was posthumously recognised, and currently (2022) the statement 'This diagram is an evolution of the original design conceived in 1931 by Harry Beck' is printed on every London Underground map.

=== Design Icon ===
As part of the Transported by Design programme of activities, on 15 October 2015, after two months of public voting, Harry Beck's tube map was elected by Londoners as number 3 of the 10 favourite transport design icons.

== Other works ==
In 1938 he produced a diagram of the entire rail system of the London region (as far as St Albans in the north, Ongar in the north east, Romford in the east, Bromley in the south east, Mitcham in the south, Hinchley Wood in the south west, Ashford in the west, and Tring in the north west). It included both the Underground and mainlines. It was not published at the time but was seen in Ken Garland's book, first published in 1994; it took until 1973 until any official attempt was made to replicate a rail diagram for the entire London region.

Beck produced at least one map for British Railways. After nationalisation, the Eastern Region commissioned Beck to produce a map of the suburban lines out of Marylebone, King's Cross, Liverpool Street and Fenchurch Street, similar in scope to earlier maps produced by George Dow for the London & North Eastern Railway.

Beck produced at least two versions of a diagram for the Paris Métro. The project, which Beck was never commissioned to do, may have been begun, according to Ken Garland, as early as before the start of World War II. A version dating from approximately 1946 is published in Garland's book. His second version was published for the first time in Mark Ovenden's book about the Paris Métro.

== Recognition ==
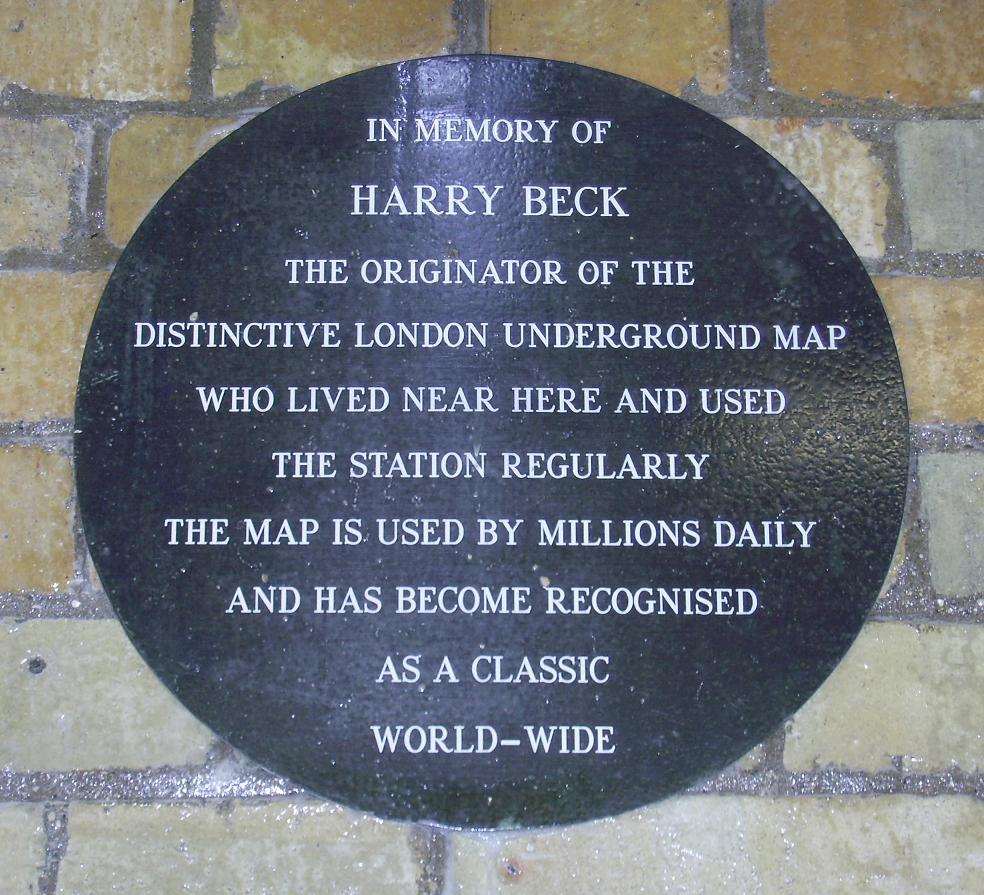
Memorial plaque at Finchley Central Underground station

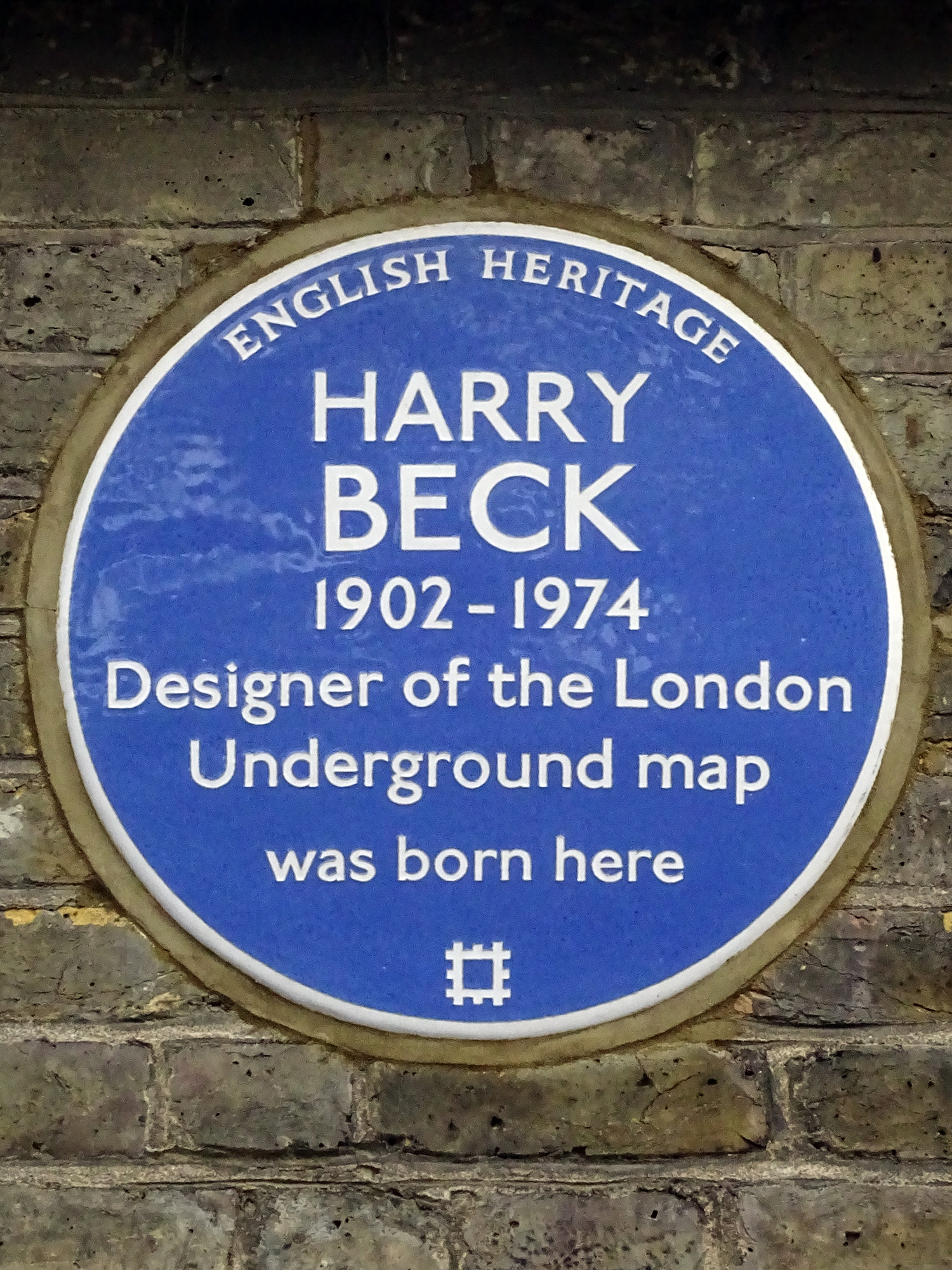
Blue plaque in Wesley Road, Leyton

According to some accounts, Beck was never formally commissioned to develop his initial idea, and worked on the map only in his spare time. He was thus never actually paid for the map. Other sources report that he was paid a fee of five or ten guineas.

London Regional Transport created the Beck gallery at the London Transport Museum in the early 1990s, where his works are displayed. A commemorative plaque was installed at Finchley Central Underground Station. Beck's home at 60 Court House Road, Finchley was marked with a plaque by the Finchley Society in 2003.

In March 2006 viewers of BBC2's The Culture Show and visitors to London's Design Museum voted Harry Beck's Tube map as their second-favourite British design of the 20th century in the Great British Design Quest. The winner was Concorde and in third place was the Supermarine Spitfire.

GB Railfreight named locomotive 66721 after Beck in January 2007.

In January 2009 the Royal Mail included Beck's map when it issued a set of postage stamps celebrating British design classics.

In March 2013 a blue plaque was unveiled on the house where Beck was born, in Wesley Road in Leyton, to mark the 80th anniversary of the Tube map.

In 2021 a play, The Truth About Harry Beck, was staged at the Theatre Royal Bath's Ustinov Studio. The play portrays Beck's journey to create the Tube map and the challenges he faced along the way, focusing on his commitment, and the role of his wife, Nora, in supporting his work. In 2024 the play was staged at the London Transport Museum's Cubic Theatre.
