= Spider map =

Schematic bus service diagram for an area

A "spider map" showing routes from a London bus stop

A spider map is a schematic diagram of bus services serving a particular locality, as used by Transport for London since 2002. The maps were designed by T-Kartor. Generally mounted on the vertical surfaces of bus shelters it enables potential travellers to select the correct stop to board a bus, and the correct one to alight at. The maps are designed to be self-explanatory in the same way as the London Underground tube map.

These maps are highly specific to a local area, and it would not be sensible to talk about a spider map for London. About 1500 are needed to describe the London Transport area. The term spider map seems to have come from its users, and although TfL have adopted the term, they are officially known as "bus route diagrams".

== Design ==
At the centre of the map is a rectangular area with a yellow background which shows the local street layout and bus stops labelled with letters (A to Z, and if necessary AA to ZZ) of all the bus-stops in the local area. Beyond this is a schematic bus map for an area about 2 kilometres (1.2 mi) radius with a pale yellow background, which shows all bus stops in their relative positions. Further out of the map shows the remainder of the route against a white background, but without showing all bus stops. Bus routes themselves are shown as distinctive coloured lines, and are clearly numbered.

In addition there is a table of routes (by route number, destination and local bus stop) leaving from that node, for either daytime or sometimes nighttime routes.
