= Topological map =

Type of map

A map of the New York City Subway, an example of a topological map.

An office environment consisting of two rooms connected by a hallway. A topological map is super-imposed.

In cartography, geology, and robotics, a topological map (sometimes schematic map) is a type of diagram that has been simplified so that only vital information remains and unnecessary detail has been removed. These maps lack scale, also distance and direction are subject to change and/or variation, but the topological relationship between points is maintained. A good example are the transit maps for the London Underground and the New York City Subway.

== See also ==
- Transit map
- Outline of cartography
