= London Dial-a-Ride =

Community transport service in London, England

Coordinates: 51°29′32.7″N 0°04′50.2″W

Dial-a-Ride logo

Dial-a-Ride is a service run by Transport for London (TfL) which is mainly a door-to-door community transport service for people with a permanent or long term disability or health problem who are unable, or virtually unable to use public transport. In 2019, there were around 40,000 members of the scheme.

== History ==
In December 1972, London Transport began operating a dial a ride service in Hampstead, aimed at both commuters and shoppers. This ended in 1976 due to high costs.

In 1982, Camden Council set up London's first dial a ride scheme for disabled residents, with funding from the Greater London Council (GLC). Several London councils including Greenwich soon followed. Following the successful development of GAD-about in Greenwich, a clone prototype project was developed for London Transport which was then handed over in a modular form to allow easy implementation and scaling up. By the late 1980s, there were over 25 dial a ride groups across London, subsidised by a £7.2m grant from London Regional Transport.

Map of the London Dial-a-Ride service areas before 2003.

Until 2002, the London Dial-a-Ride service consisted of six sectors, each of which had its own main colour on the Mercedes-Benz Sprinter minibuses:

Central London (Camden, Kensington & Chelsea, Hammersmith & Fulham, Westminster)
North London (Barnet, City of London, Enfield, Hackney, Haringey, Islington)
North East London (Barking & Dagenham, Havering, Newham, Redbridge, Tower Hamlets, Waltham Forest)
South East London (Bexley, Bromley, Greenwich, Lewisham, Southwark)
South London (Croydon, Kingston upon Thames, Lambeth, Merton, Sutton, Wandsworth)
West London (Brent, Ealing, Harrow, Hillingdon, Hounslow, Richmond upon Thames)

Since 2002, Dial-a-Ride has been run and funded solely by TfL. In 2012, TfL began replacing the entire Dial-a-Ride fleet at a cost of £3.9 million.

== Governance ==
Dial-a-Ride is a trading name of London Buses Limited. It is a subsidiary of Transport for London.

== Fleet ==
As of 2022, the fleet comprises 256 accessible vehicles, all Mellor Tucana low floor minibuses, built on the Volkswagen Transporter platform. The fleet meets Euro VI emission standards, and therefore is Ultra Low Emission Zone compliant. Historically, a range of vehicles have been used including Mercedes-Benz Sprinter and Vito minibuses.

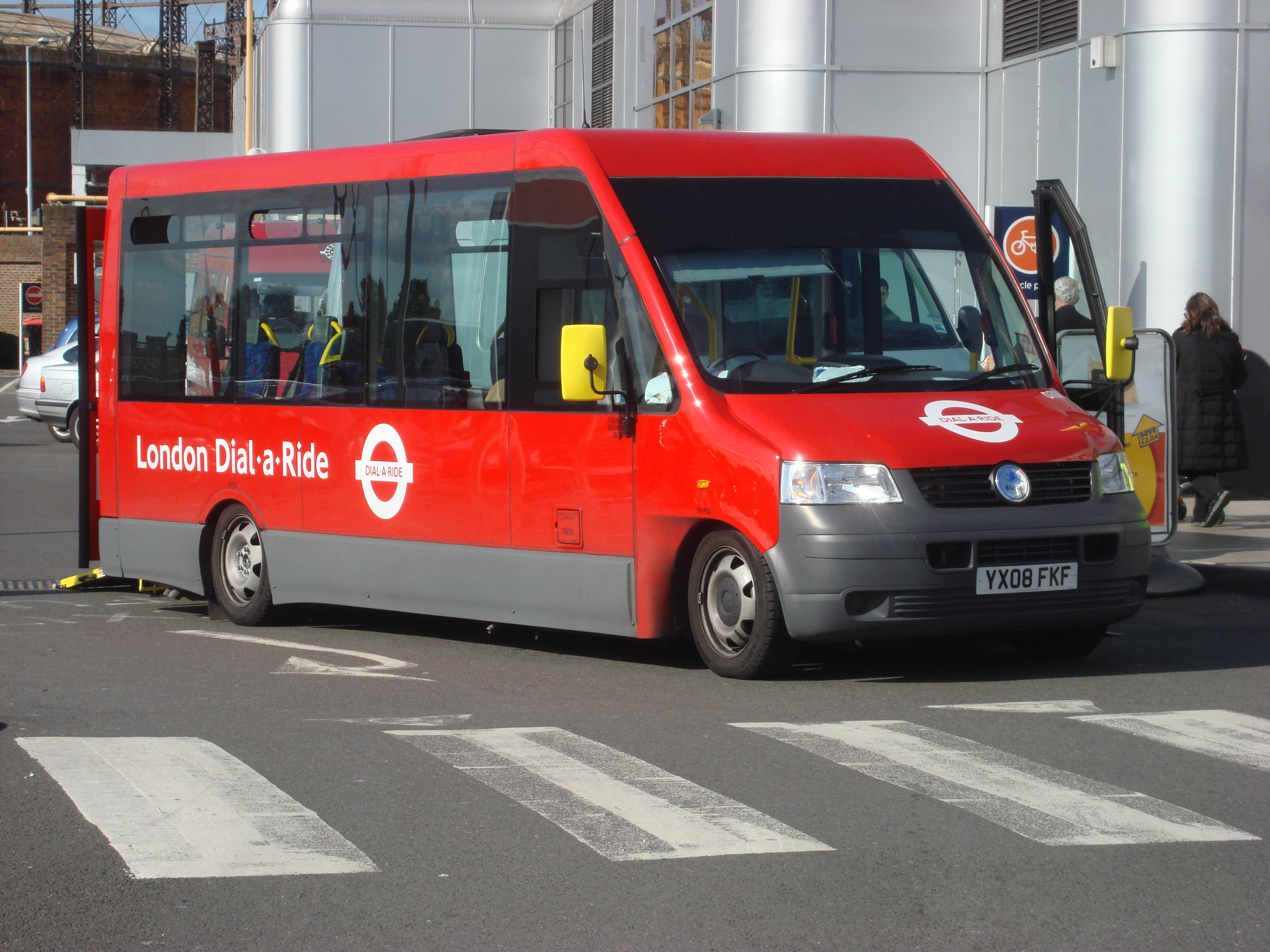
A Volkswagen Transporter (Mellor Tucana) low floor minibus.

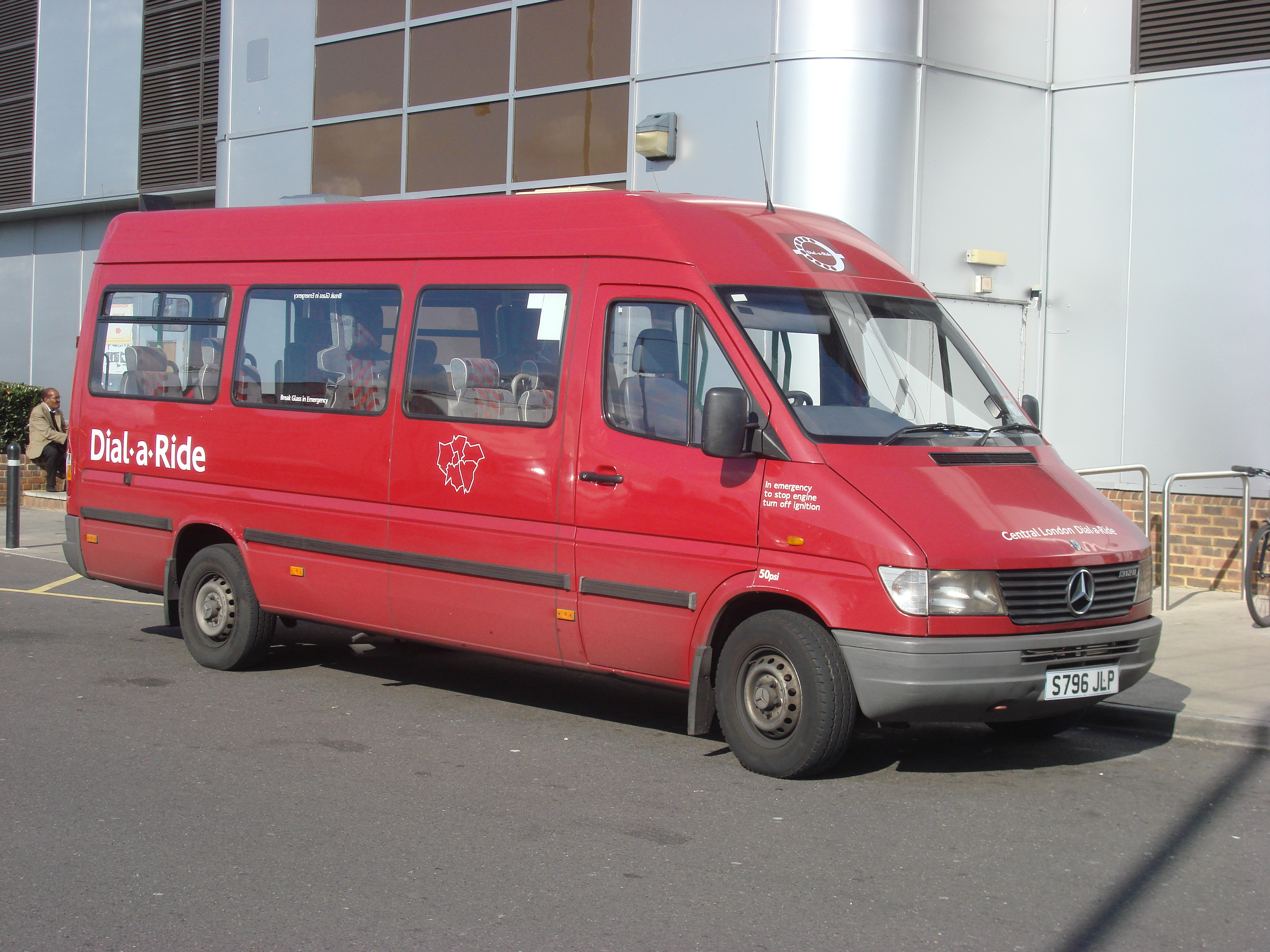
A Mercedes-Benz Sprinter minibus.

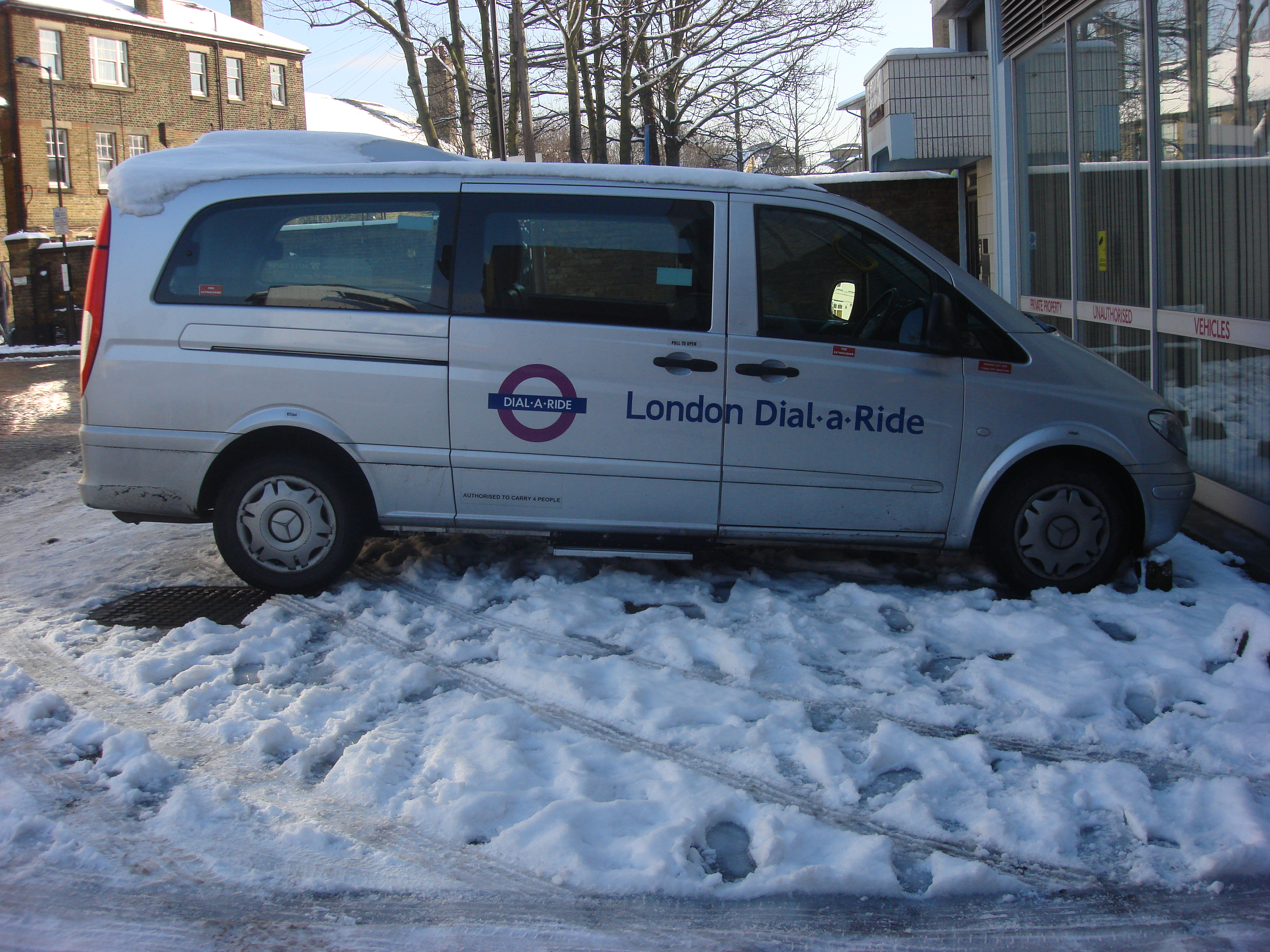
A Mercedes-Benz Vito minibus.

== Taxicard ==
The 'Taxicard' scheme provides subsidised taxi and private hire journeys for Londoners with serious mobility or visual issues, with around 60,000 members registered to the scheme. The scheme is run by London Councils.

== See also ==
- Accessibility of transport in London
- Paratransit
