= North Finchley =

Suburb of London, England

Coordinates: 51.617°N 0.174°W

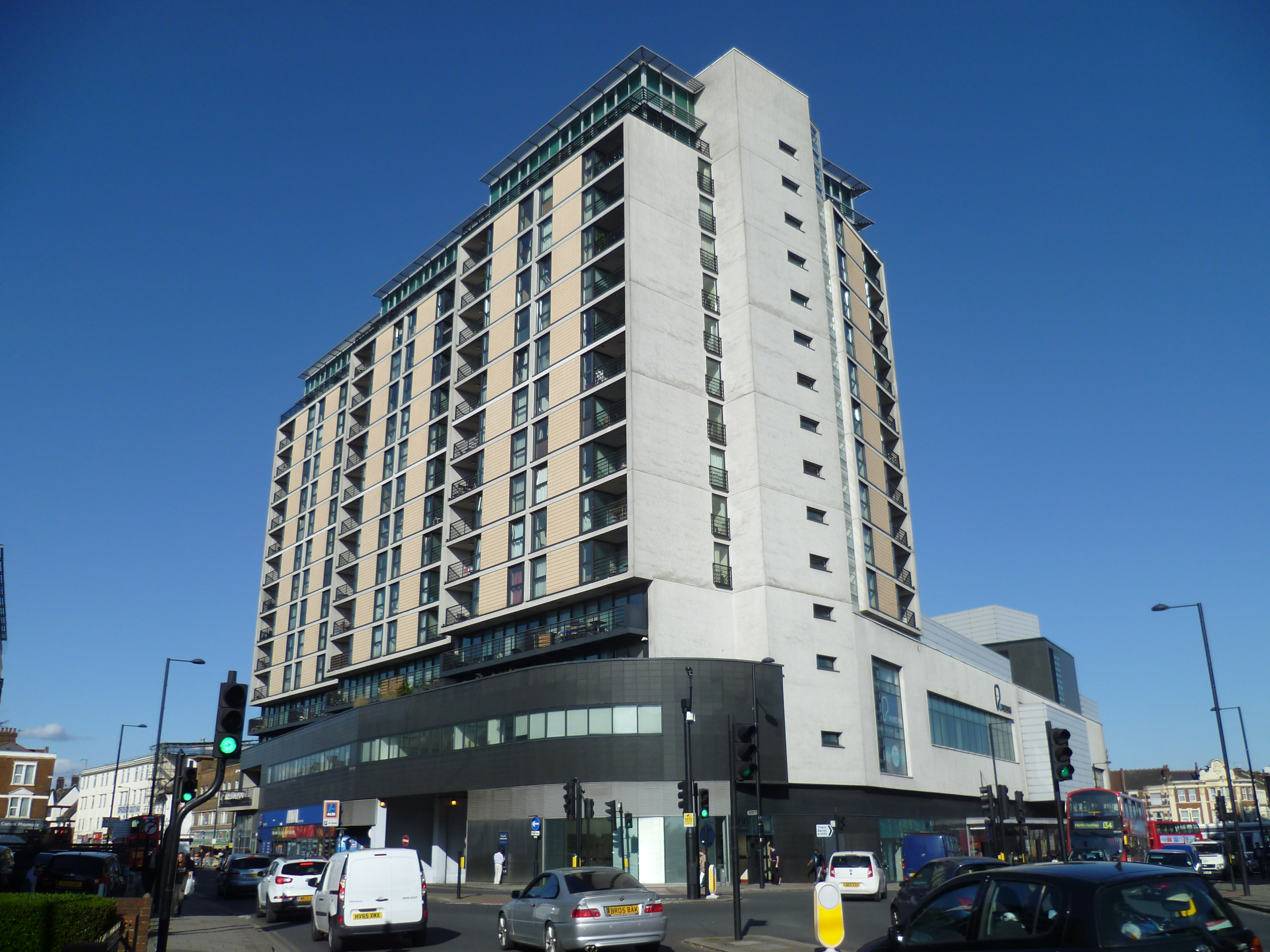
- High-rise at Tally Ho Corner

- Location within Greater London
- OS grid reference: TQ265925
- London borough: Barnet
- Ceremonial county: Greater London
- Region: London
- Country: England
- Sovereign state: United Kingdom
- Post town: LONDON
- Postcode district: N12
- Dialling code: 020
- Police: Metropolitan
- Fire: London
- Ambulance: London
- UK Parliament: Finchley & Golders Green
- London Assembly: Barnet and Camden

North Finchley is a suburb of London in the London Borough of Barnet, situated seven miles (11 km) north-northwest of Charing Cross. North Finchley is centred on Tally Ho Corner, the junction of the roads to East Finchley, Church End, Friern Barnet and Whetstone.

North Finchley offers an array of amenities, including parks such as Victoria Park, providing residents and visitors alike with spaces for relaxation and recreation. Excellent transport links, including bus routes and nearby tube stations like Woodside Park and Finchley Central, facilitate easy travel to and from central London and surrounding areas.

Lodge Lane has a large car park, part of which is used as a Friday market.

== Description ==
It is primarily a residential and shopping area, with several supermarkets and many restaurants. The artsdepot, a local community arts centre including a gallery, a studio and a theatre, was opened on 23 October 2004 in an attempt to revitalise the area, and in order to fill a gap created by the demolition of the Gaumont cinema and what had become an open-air market.

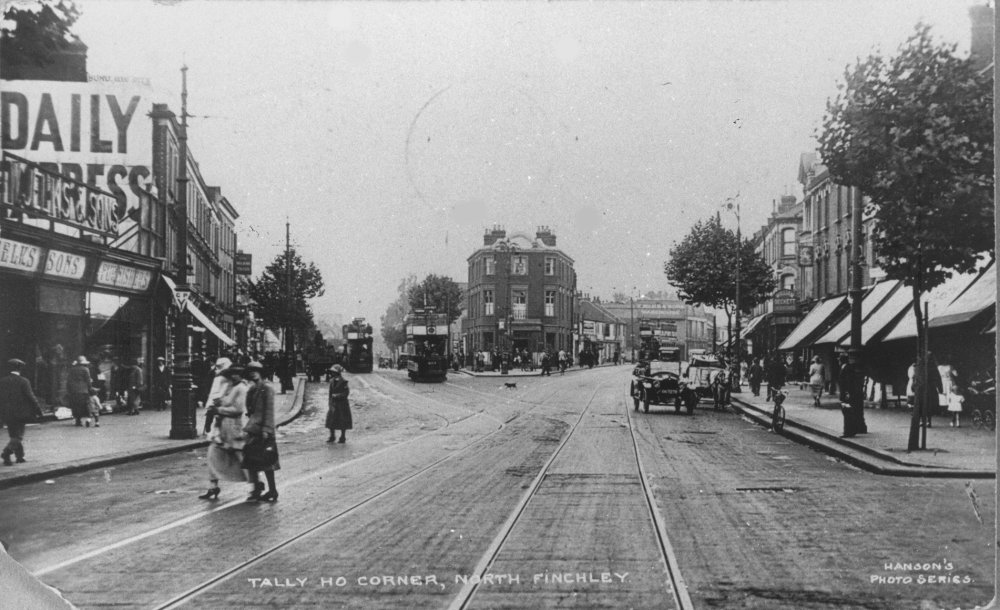
Tally Ho Corner in an old postcard.

The area has mainly 19th-century housing, ranging from Victorian cottages to substantially larger Victorian double-fronted houses. There is also a dominant Edwardian style toward Woodside Park and Nether Street, but with some modern houses—probably built between the 1930s and 1960s—towards Friern Barnet. There are some mansion-style properties on Friern Barnet Lane, and a development of luxury flats at Tally Ho Corner, above the artsdepot, with views over Mill Hill and Hertfordshire. There are few local authority estates in the area; the largest one is in Woodside Park.

== Transport ==
The new North Finchley bus station opened in 2004. However, it closed several months later owing to safety issues, after an 89-year-old pensioner walked into the shelter through the wrong entrance, was hit by a bus, and died. The bus station was reopened in March 2007 after safety improvements had been implemented.

The bus station is served by routes 13, 125, 221 (to Edgware only), 460, 683, as well as London Superloop express bus routes SL1 and SL10. From the stop on the Great North Road going south, it is served by routes 112, 134, 221 (to Turnpike Lane only), 263, 383, 626 and night bus route N263.

The area is served by West Finchley and Woodside Park Tube stations, both on the High Barnet branch of the Northern line.

== Balfour House bombing ==
On 26 July 1994 a bomb exploded outside Balfour House, a prominent building on North Finchley High Street and location of the offices of numerous Jewish charities. Earlier on the same day, a bomb had exploded outside the Israeli embassy. Two Palestinians, Samar Alami and Jawad Botmeh, were subsequently convicted of carrying out the Finchley bombing.

== History ==
An urban district of Finchley, part of the then county of Middlesex (since abolished) was created in 1894. In 1932 the Municipal Borough of Finchley was created, but in 1965 the municipal borough was abolished and its area became part of the London Borough of Barnet.

Margaret Thatcher was elected as MP for Finchley in 1959; she served until her retirement from the House of Commons in 1992.

=== Tally Ho Corner and the High Road ===
North ward of Finchley Urban District in the 1930s.

Wards of Finchley Municipal Borough in the 1950s.

North End, the old name for the area of North Finchley and Whetstone, was first recorded in 1462. North Finchley did not develop into an urban area until after the enclosure of Finchley Common after 1816. Prior to that, in 1627, Thomas Rawson was allowed to construct a windmill and house which by 1722 had also become an inn, the Windmill. By 1754 the inn was called the Swan with Two Nicks and had ceased as a mill. The site is now a police garage.

Ballards Lane is an ancient road which was probably named after the Ballard family of about 1300. It did not always connect with the High Road. For many centuries it terminated near where Victoria Park is today. In 1756 a raised way was constructed from the end of Ballards Lane to the High Road, then the Great North Road, making North Finchley a junction. This suggests that Ballards Lane had already become a link in a route from London via Hendon to the Great North Road. There was a beer house in 1814, licensed to provide gunpowder and shot, near the junction.

The name Tally Ho allegedly originates from the 1830s when a coaching company of the same name based a staging post of 16 horses on the corner, serving as a stop where the horses were changed on their way to Birmingham. There is, however, no direct evidence of the company ever having existed; local historians believe that it is unlikely that the company ever existed, or that the horses would have needed changing so early on in their journey from London to Birmingham. But it was later, with the enclosure of the Common after 1816 and the creation of the Finchley Road turnpike along Ballards Lane in the late 1820s, that beginnings of a suburb were sparked.

Charles Jacques built twenty-one cottages in Lodge Lane around 1824 and constructed Torrington Cottage as a residence. By the 1830s there were other houses and in 1837 a dissenting chapel, "Cottagers Chapel", which had been converted from the stables of Orchard Cottage.

By 1839 North Finchley had at least five retail outlets including a blacksmith called Elizabeth Humphreys. These were on Lodge Lane rather than on the High Road. Incidentally Lodge Lane was the home of Private John Parr the first British soldier to be killed in World War I, the composer David Pentecost and the actor David Jason.

In 1851, there was a regular 'bus service running from the Torrington to Charing Cross and railway connections had been established with London, first at New Southgate. During the 1850s and 1860s Woodside Lane, Torrington Park, Friern Park, Grove Road, Finsbury Road (now Finchley Park) had all been laid out. In 1872 the Edgware, Highgate and London Railway opened Torrington Park Station which was renamed Woodside Park in 1882. It was during the construction of a railway through Finchley from 1864 that a Reverend Henry Stephens opened a mission for the navvies working on the line. A church had been constructed by 1869 which was formally opened in 1870 as Christ Church. It became a new parish in 1872. By 1874 it was said that there were 350 dwellings within this ecclesiastical parish.

In 1905. the Metropolitan Electric Tramways (the M.E.T.) opened a tramline between Highgate and Whetstone and this was crossed by another from New Southgate to Golders Green from 1909. To facilitate this a tramway depot was opened in Woodberry Grove. Trams combined with motorbus services promoted the development of the retail district we see today. During the 1930s the old Ballards Lane, which terminated where the Embassy Lounge (formerly called the Purple Rain Bar, before that the Cherry Tree and previously the Coach Stop) is today, was replaced by a new road called Kingsway. In 1937 the new plot created by this diversion became the location for the Gaumont Cinema. This was demolished in 1987 to be replaced with the recently opened Arts Depot.

The Finchley Meeting House, the local Quaker place of worship, was built on Alexandra Grove in 1967. Quakers had met in the area since 1945.

=== Woodhouse and the Rough Lots ===
The Woodhouse area of Finchley began with three houses called the Woodhouses sometime before 1655. In the mid-18th century there was a single house of this name and it was home to the well-known plasterer Thomas Collins. It was reconstructed in 1888 and in 1925 it became Woodhouse Grammar School (Now Woodhouse College).

Summers Lane existed from at least the 18th century as a short cut from the main road through to Friern Barnet. Below it and to the east is a small pocket of woodland called Coppetts Wood, one of the last remnants of the medieval Finchley Wood. Close to Coppetts Wood a sewage farm was established by Finchley in 1885, of which, since the area's sewage was diverted to Deephams Sewage Treatment Works, Edmonton in 1961, only the manager's cottage remains.

A small isolation hospital with 18 beds was established: it evolved to become Coppetts Wood Hospital.

After enclosure the eastern end of Summers Lane was developed by Henry Dunger, owner of the Flower Pot brewery in Dunger Place (now Summers Place), from the 1830s until the 1870s.

The area popularly called the Rough Lots, officially called the Glebe Land, was the location (from 1879 until the early 20th century) of John Lawford's brick works. On a site where Summers Lane meets the High Road a gun battery was placed in World War I as a defence against early German air raids.

Finchley football club (now Wingate and Finchley F.C.), founded in 1874, started playing football on the Glebe Lands in 1932. Ken Aston, late president of the club, was the man who started the system of red and yellow cards use by referees.

The Finchley Lido was a swimming pool opened by Finchley Borough Council in September 1931. A tour de force of art deco, the main pool was heated until World War II. During the 1948 Olympic Games the pool was used for the water polo events. (Only a men's event in those days.) The pool was the first element in a Finchley complex which was to include a Town Hall for which plans were drawn up in 1936 but never realised.

In 1938 the War Office built a drill hall at the bottom of the hill for the 61 Heavy Anti-Aircraft Regt RA (TA), better known locally as the T.A. centre. The open air pool was closed in 1992 and replaced by the present complex in May 1996 The T.A. centre was demolished in 2004.

=== Fallow Corner ===
The area of Fallow Corner was recorded in 1429, probably Cobley's Farm (so called by the 17th century). By the 18th century there was a small hamlet of houses and the access roads from these to the main road formed the distinct Bow Road we see today.

Between 1806 and 1827 the clown Joseph Grimaldi lived here. It was whilst "ghost writing" Grimaldi's memoirs that Charles Dickens probably first stayed at the farm during 1836 and 1837. Later, in 1843, he returned and wrote portions of Martin Chuzzlewit, conceiving the character of 'Sairey' Gamp whilst out walking in Finchley. The Farm's fields were realised for building, as the Etchingham Park Estate, between 1878 and 1920, the farm itself disappearing in 1905.

Two institutions occupied the fields within the bow of Bow Lane. Finchley Cottage Hospital opened with 18 beds in 1908 and was renamed the Finchley Memorial Hospital in 1922. The original hospital was paid for out of subscriptions and the later extensions raised to form a memorial for the Finchley dead of World War I. Finchley County School was opened in 1903. Dame Evelyn Turner (1910–1993), on whose life the television series Tenko was partially based, went to school here. The building was demolished in 2004.

The Elephant Inn, formerly Moss Hall Tavern

=== Moss Hall and Woodside Park ===
On the north western edge of Finchley Common there were four houses by the 17th century. At Nether Street was Moss Hall, a name taken from a house in the area which may have existed in the 15th century (named after the Mosse family), and certainly in existence since the 18th century. The house was demolished in 1927 after much of the estate had been built on after the 1860s. The name survives in the names of streets such as Moss Hall Grove and, until the 1990s, a pub called the Moss Hall Tavern (the pub still exists but has been renamed the Elephant Inn).

Further up was Court House which may have been the house in 1664 owned by the Peacock Family who owned Frith Manor. Prior to the building of Frith manor house in 1790 the Court House was the main house of the estate and it is possible that the manorial courts were held here (hence the name). The house was demolished and the remnants of the estate sold in 1936.

Finchley Lodge (from which Lodge Lane takes its name) may have existed by 1564 and was certainly there by 1667. Finally there was Woodside House, again possibly a medieval property but certainly known by 1699, around which a small hamlet had developed by the 1750s. By the 1800s it was called Woodside Farm and when the estate was left to Henry Holden, after whom Holden Road is named, the estate was developed into housing as the Woodside Park Estate.

Holden built an assembly room, Woodside Hall, in 1885. In 1950 it was converted to a synagogue. St Barnabas church was established as a tin chapel in 1885 and as a proper church in 1912. Spike Milligan, the comedian, lived in Holden Road.

== See also ==
- List of people from Barnet
- London Studio Centre
