= Finchley tube station =

Finchley tube station could refer to one of a number of London Underground stations serving the Finchley area of north London:

- East Finchley
- Finchley Central
- West Finchley

Finchley Road station is located in Swiss Cottage.
