= Totteridge & Whetstone tube station =

London Underground station

Totteridge & Whetstone
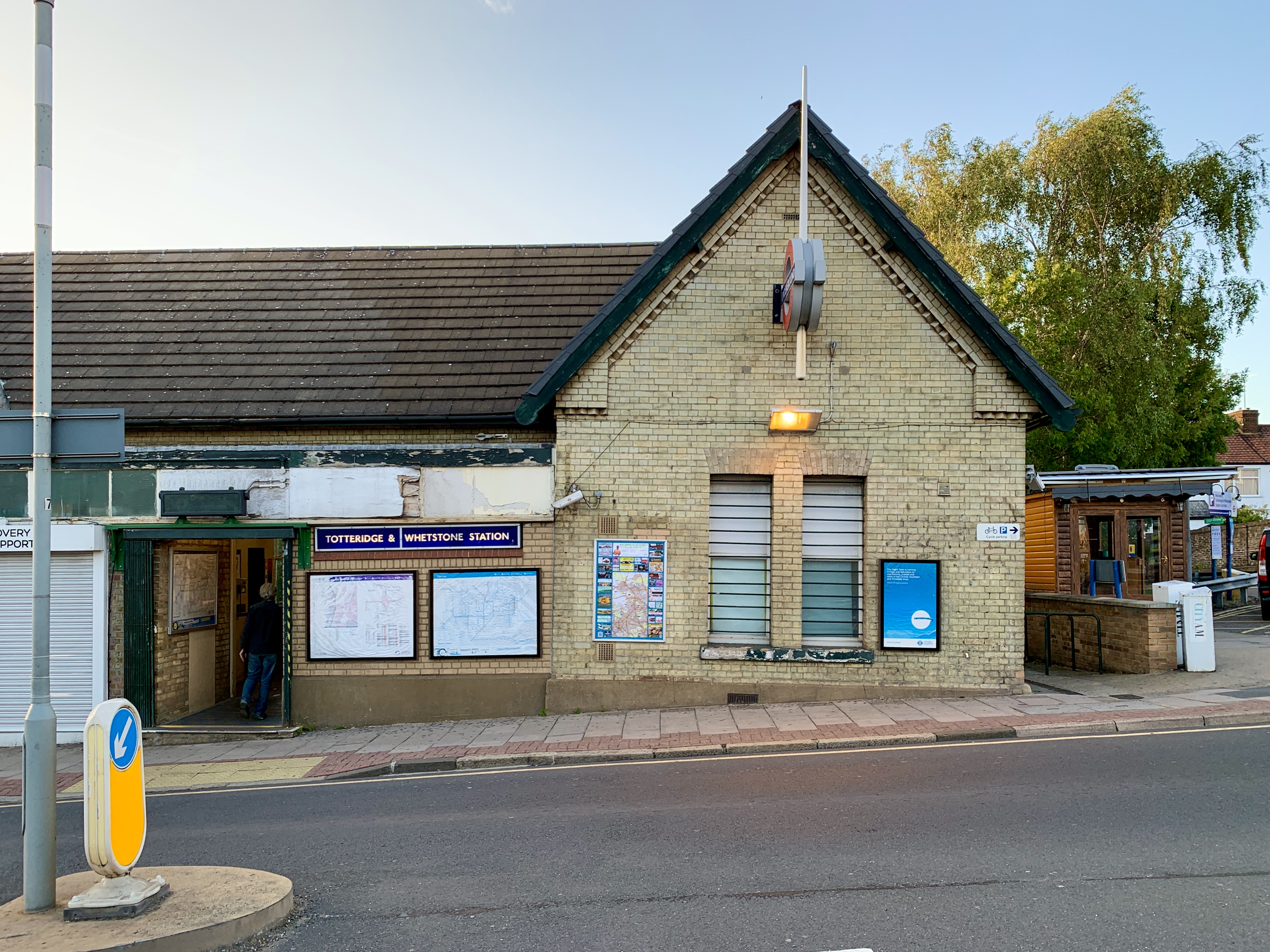
- Station entrance on the left
- Interactive map of Totteridge & Whetstone

General information
- Location: Whetstone
- Local authority: London Borough of Barnet
- Managed by: London Underground
- Number of platforms: 2
- Fare zone: 4

London Underground annual entry and exit
- 2021: ▲1.06 million
- 2022: ▲1.81 million
- 2023: ▲1.99 million
- 2024: ▼1.95 million
- 2025: ▲2.08 million

Key dates
- 1 April 1872: Opened (GNR)
- 14 April 1940: Started (Northern line)
- 1941: Ended (LNER)
- 1 October 1962: Goods yard closed

Other information
- External links: TfL station info page
- Coordinates: 51.63056°N 0.17917°W

Totteridge & Whetstone (/ˈtɒtərɪdʒ ənd ˈwɛtstoʊn/) is a London Underground station. Located on the eastern edge of Whetstone in the London Borough of Barnet, it serves both Whetstone and neighbouring Totteridge to the west. The station is on the High Barnet branch of the Northern line, between High Barnet and Woodside Park stations. It is in London fare zone 4. It opened in 1872.

The station is on the north side of Totteridge Lane (A5109), to the east of the Dollis Brook, the traditional boundary between Totteridge and Whetstone, so narrowly in the latter.

== History ==
The station was built by the Edgware, Highgate and London Railway (EH&LR) and was originally opened as Totteridge on 1 April 1872 by the Great Northern Railway which had taken over the EH&LR. The station was on a branch off of the line running from Finsbury Park to Edgware via Highgate. It was renamed Totteridge & Whetstone on 1 April 1874.

After the Railways Act 1921 created the Big Four railway companies the line was, from 1923, part of the London and North Eastern Railway (LNER). The section of the High Barnet branch north of East Finchley was incorporated into the London Underground network as part of the "Northern Heights" project which began in the late 1930s. Totteridge and Whetstone station was first served by Northern line trains on 14 April 1940 and, after a period where the station was serviced by both operators, LNER services ended in 1941.

British Railways (the successor to the LNER) freight trains continued to serve the station's goods yard until 1 October 1962, when it was closed. The goods yard was converted into the station's car park.

== Station facilities ==
The station retains much of its original Victorian architectural character. It is not wheelchair accessible owing to flights of stairs to the two platforms.

The station is only normally staffed during peak hours. It has a passenger hall, four gates, two toilets (a female toilet on the southbound platform and a male toilet on the northbound platform), a car park, and waiting rooms.

== Services ==
Totteridge & Whetstone station is on the High Barnet branch of the Northern line in London fare zone 4. It is between High Barnet to the north and Woodside Park to the south. The typical offpeak service at this station in trains per hour is as follows:

- 16tph Northbound to High Barnet
- 8tph Southbound to Battersea via Charing Cross
- 8tph Southbound to Morden via Bank

== Connections ==
London Bus routes 34, 125, 234, 251, 263, 326, 383, 605, 626, 628, 634 and 688 and night route N20 serve the station.

== See also ==
- Northern Line Embankment, High Barnet

| Preceding station | London Underground | Following station |
|---|---|---|
| High Barnet Terminus | Northern line High Barnet branch | Woodside Park towards Battersea Power Station, Morden or Kennington |
