= Woodside Park tube station =

London Underground station

Woodside Park
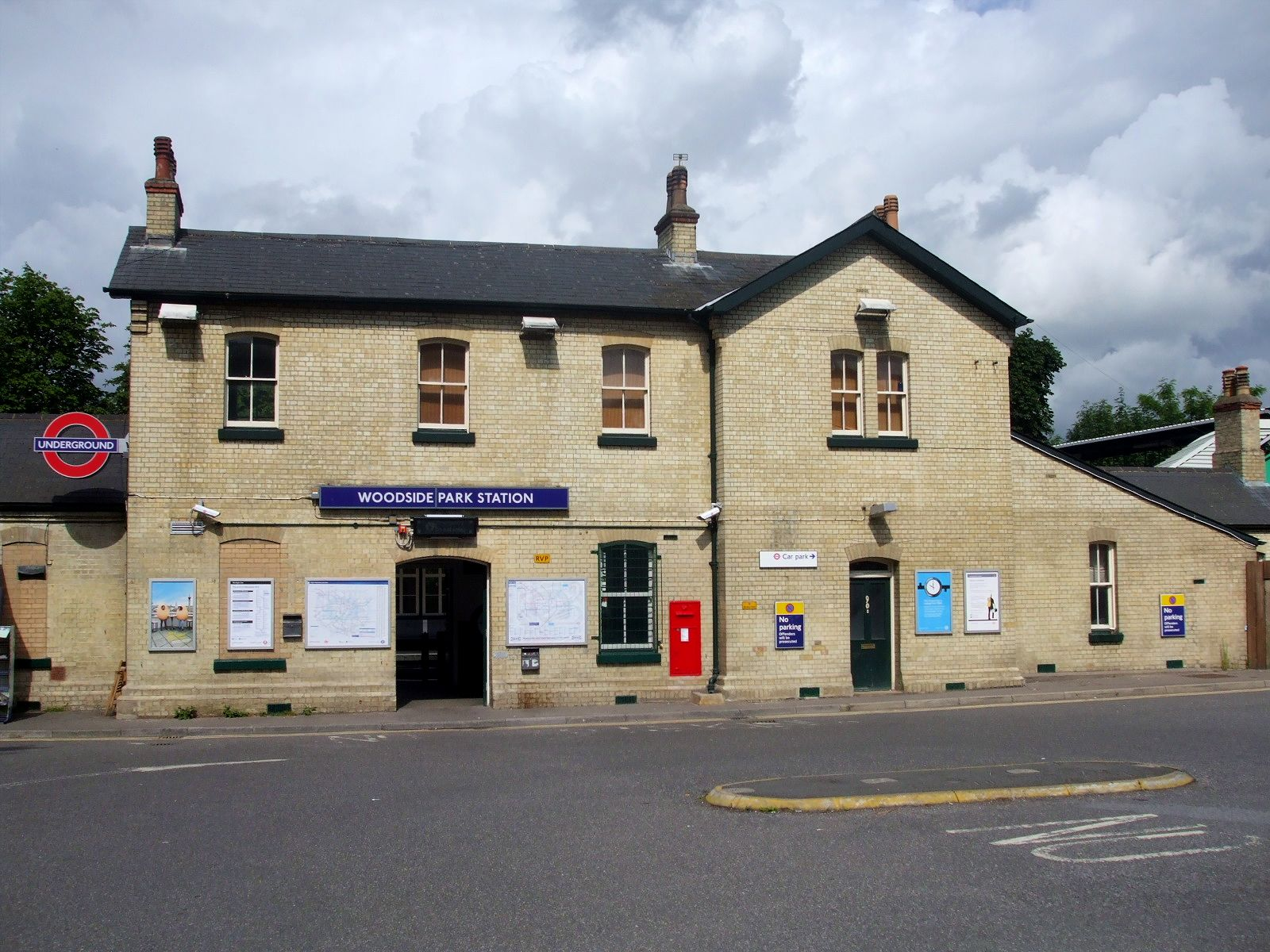
- Station building
- Interactive map of Woodside Park

General information
- Location: Woodside Park
- Local authority: London Borough of Barnet
- Managed by: London Underground
- Number of platforms: 2
- Fare zone: 4

London Underground annual entry and exit
- 2020: ▼1.96 million
- 2021: ▲2.02 million
- 2022: ▲3.47 million
- 2023: ▲3.66 million
- 2024: ▼3.10 million

Railway companies
- Original company: Edgware, Highgate and London Railway
- Pre-grouping: Great Northern Railway
- Post-grouping: LNER

Key dates
- 1 April 1872: Opened by EH&LR as Torrington Park
- 1872: Renamed as Torrington Park, Woodside
- 1882: Renamed as Woodside Park
- 14 April 1940: Northern line services started
- 1941: LNER services ended
- 1 October 1962: Goods yard closed

Other information
- External links: TfL station info page
- Coordinates: 51.61806°N 0.18556°W

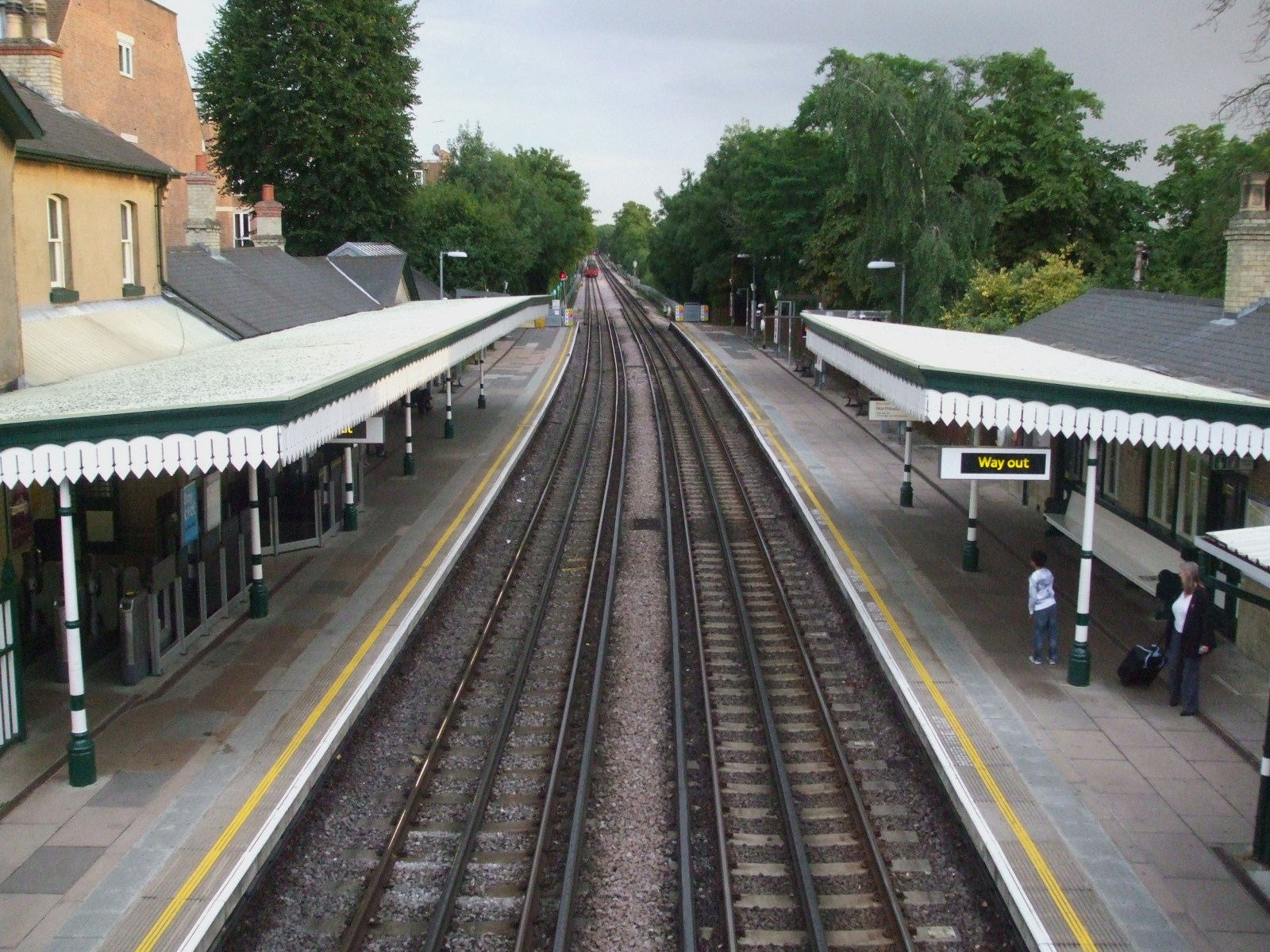
Northern line platforms viewed from the footbridge, facing south

Woodside Park is a London Underground station. It is located in Woodside Park. The station is on the High Barnet branch of the Northern line, between Totteridge & Whetstone and West Finchley stations. It is in London fare zone 4. Woodside Park is the last station in an alphabetical list of London Underground stations.

== History ==
Woodside Park station was planned by the Edgware, Highgate and London Railway (EH&LR) and was originally opened as Torrington Park on 1 April 1872 by the Great Northern Railway (which had taken over the EH&LR). The station was on a branch of a line that ran from Finsbury Park to Edgware via Highgate. The station was renamed within a month of opening, and again in 1882.

After the Railways Act 1921 created the Big Four railway companies the line was, from 1923, part of the London & North Eastern Railway (LNER). The section of the High Barnet branch north of East Finchley was incorporated into the London Underground network through the Northern Heights project begun in the late 1930s. The station was first served by Northern line trains on 14 April 1940 and, after a period where the station was serviced by both operators, LNER services ended in 1941. The station still retains much of its original Victorian architectural character today.

British Railways (the successor to the LNER) freight trains continued to serve the station's goods yard until 1 October 1962, when it was closed.

=== Incidents ===
The Provisional IRA exploded a bomb at the station's car park on 10 December 1992, during the afternoon rush hour. Commuters and residents were evacuated, though no-one was injured. The station is close to the Inglis Barracks, where a British soldier was killed by an IRA bombing in 1988.

== Connections ==
London Buses route 383 serves the station.

== Local information ==
The station has a large adjacent area, originally for storing coal and now used as a car park. Until about 2000, there was a second car park. A block of flats has now been built on this area.

The station is above ground. Both platforms are readily accessible from the street by wheelchair. The main entrance, with ticket office, is at the end of a cul-de-sac (Woodside Park Road), adjacent to the car park entrance. This leads on to the southbound platform. A Victorian post box is set into the front wall of the station.

The entrance leading on to the northbound platform is at the end of Station Road, a turning off Holden Road.

Preceding station	London Underground	Following station
Totteridge & Whetstone towards High Barnet	Northern line High Barnet branch	West Finchley towards Battersea Power Station, Morden or Kennington
