= Artsdepot =

Multi-purpose cultural centre in North Finchley, England

Coordinates: 51°36′47″N 0°10′37″W

artsdepot
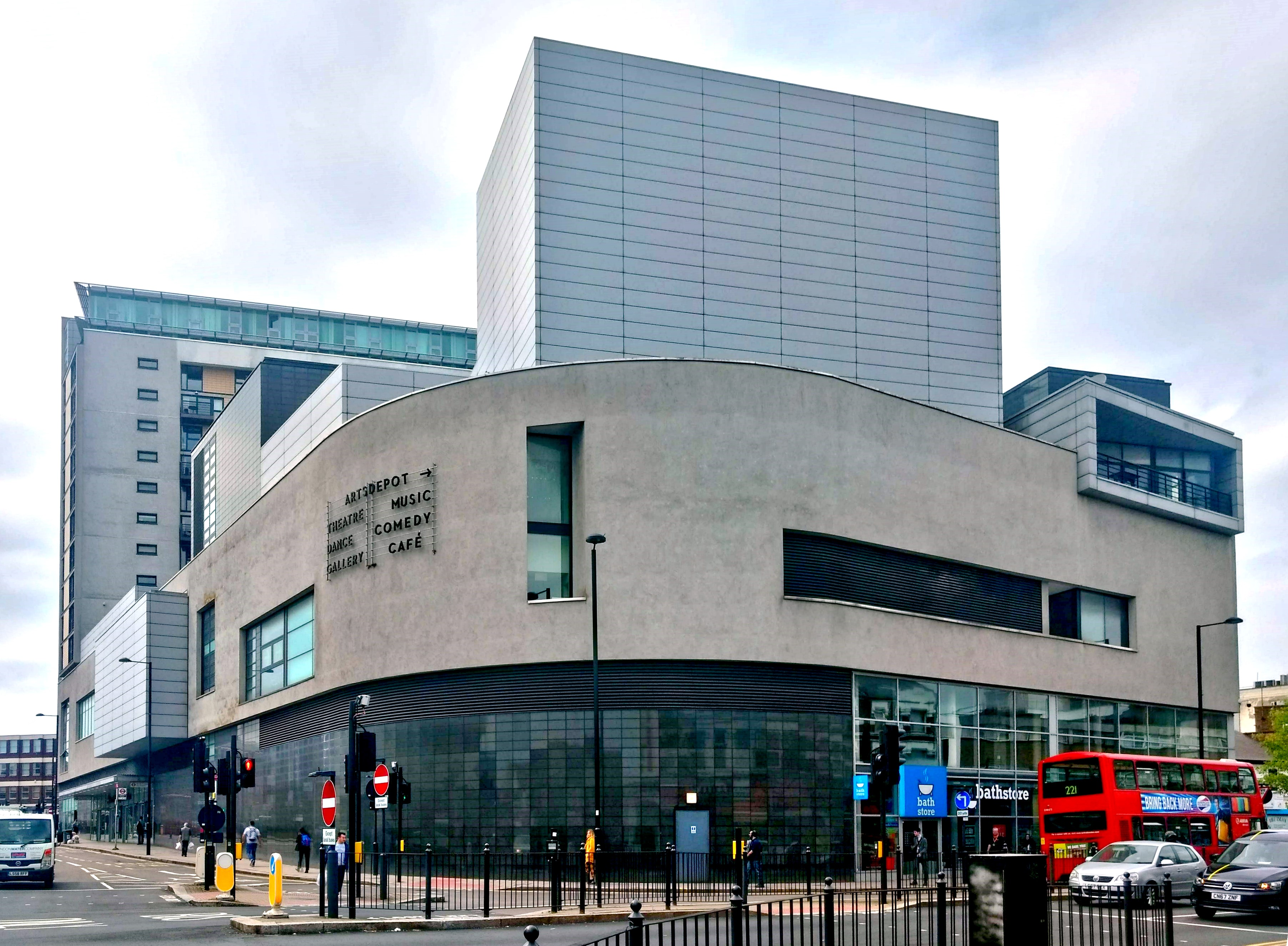
- Interactive map of artsdepot
- Address: Nether Street, London, N12
- Capacity: Pentland Theatre: 395; Studio Theatre: 148
- Public transit: West Finchley

Construction
- Opened: 23 October 2004; 21 years ago
- Architect: Ruddle Wilkinson

Website
- artsdepot.co.uk

The artsdepot is a multi-purpose cultural centre located in North Finchley, in the London borough of Barnet. It was officially opened on 23 October 2004 for the enjoyment and development of the arts in North London.

== Activities ==
The venue comprises two main theatre spaces, The Pentland Theatre with 395 seats and a Studio Theatre with 148 seats. The building also contains dance and drama studios, a gallery space and a cafe. The programme of performances ranges from theatre, to live music, comedy, dance, visual art, spoken word and children's events.

The London Studio Centre shares the artsdepot building. There is also a programme of an educational courses for children and adults. Outreach programmes include working with local schools, artistic companies, other venues, and festivals.

== History ==
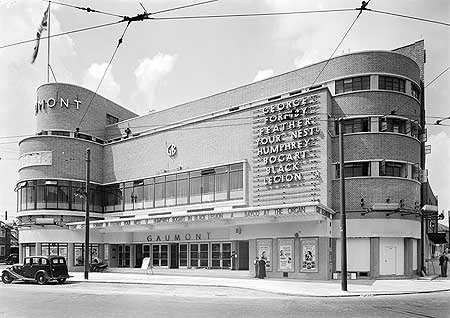
The Gaumont cinema was formerly on the site

The artsdepot was initially conceived in 1996 at the Barnet 2000 conference, which addressed what new and improved services the borough's residents would like to see in Barnet at the new Millennium. What emerged from Barnet 2000 was a need for more professional arts facilities to supplement the facilities at the existing Bull Arts Centre in High Barnet, which was at that time the only professional, if small, arts centre in the borough.

Barnet Council officers worked on the feasibility of using the Tally Ho site and brought together partners including Old Bull Arts Centre, Barnet College and Community Focus. After a capital lottery bid failed, The London Borough of Barnet sought a commercial developer to work with. They also contracted ACT theatre consultants to design the theatre spaces. The developers contracted architects Ruddle Wilkinson. The design was a result of close working with the main partners and the artistic vision was developed largely by The Bull Arts Centre's director, Alison Duthie. The developers Taylor Woodrow then developed plans for the Tally Ho regeneration in which artsdepot is located. Most of the construction costs came from the commercial development. The site on which artsdepot was built had been empty, apart from a weekly market that was relocated to the nearby Lodge Lane car park, for over 20 years since the Gaumont cinema closed down in 1980 (and later demolished in 1987).

In December 2001, the project was officially launched with the name "artsdepot" by the Secretary of State for Culture, Media and Sport, Tessa Jowell, when the building works began.

The venue was opened to the public for the first time on Saturday 23 October 2004 receiving over 2,500 visitors for its Community Open Day. The building was officially opened on 26 November 2004 by the Earl of Wessex.
