= West Finchley tube station =

London Underground station

West Finchley
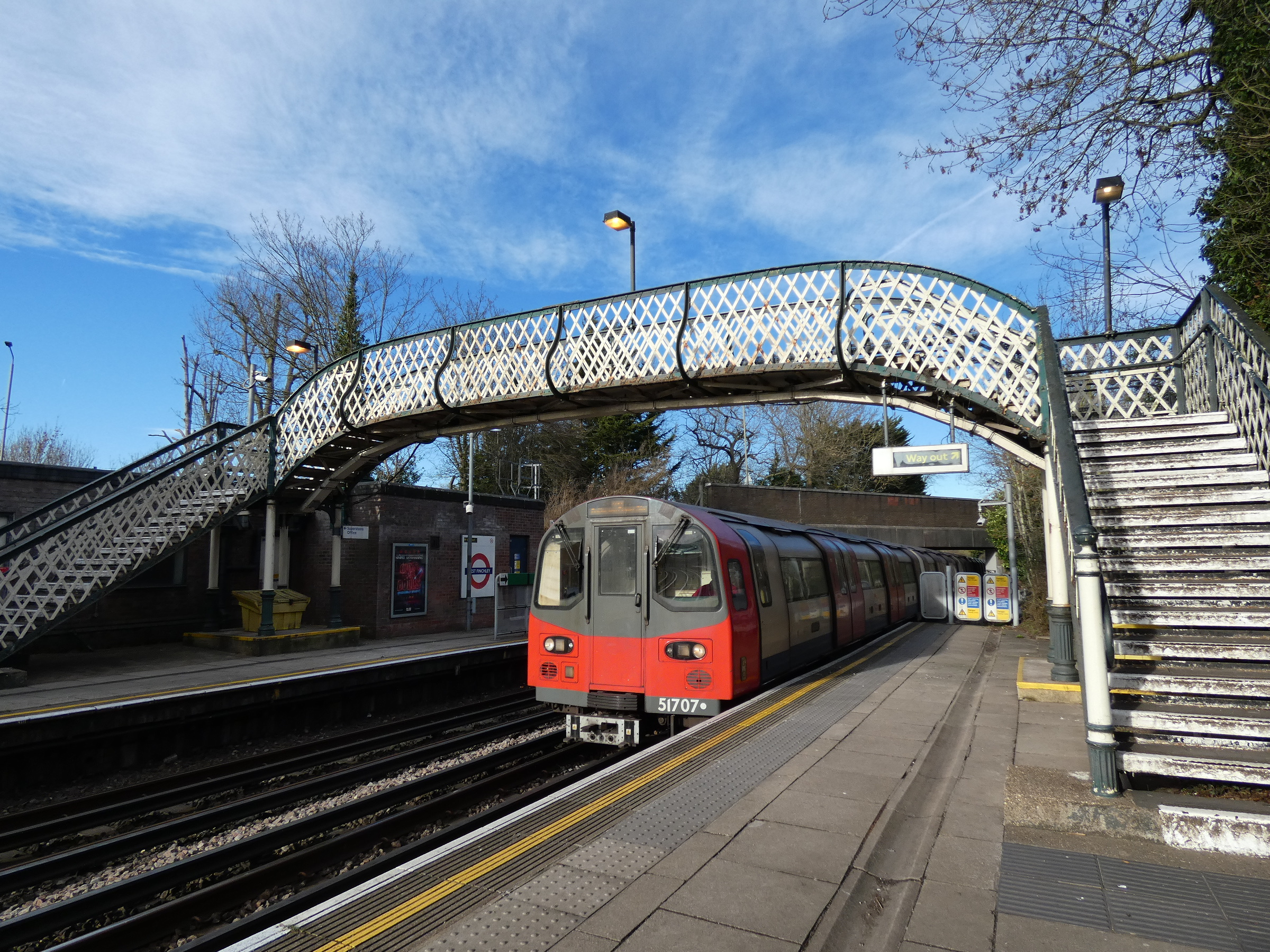
- Northern line train arriving in the southbound platform at West Finchley
- Interactive map of West Finchley

General information
- Location: Finchley
- Local authority: London Borough of Barnet
- Managed by: London Underground
- Number of platforms: 2
- Accessible: Yes
- Fare zone: 4

London Underground annual entry and exit
- 2020: ▼0.69 million
- 2021: ▲0.71 million
- 2022: ▲1.20 million
- 2023: ▲1.30 million
- 2024: ▲1.37 million

Railway companies
- Original company: London and North Eastern Railway
- Post-grouping: London and North Eastern Railway

Key dates
- 1 March 1933: Opened by LNER
- 14 April 1940: Northern line service commences
- 2 March 1941: LNER service ceased

Other information
- External links: TfL station info page
- Coordinates: 51.60944°N 0.18833°W

West Finchley is a London Underground station, located in the Finchley area of the London Borough of Barnet. It is on the High Barnet branch of the Northern line, between Woodside Park and Finchley Central stations. It is in London fare zone 4.

== History ==
The station was opened by the London & North Eastern Railway (LNER) on 1 March 1933 on its line to High Barnet. It opened to serve new housing developing in the area and was built with only modest station structures from the outset. Many fittings were taken from stations in the north of England. It has been written that the footbridge came from Wintersett and Ryhill on the Barnsley Coal Railway in Yorkshire, which had closed in 1930. However, that footbridge looks different and Jago Hazzard speculates that it actually came from the next station on that line, Notton and Royston.

The section of the High Barnet branch north of East Finchley was incorporated into the London Underground network through the Northern Heights project begun in the late 1930s. West Finchley station was first served by Northern line trains on 14 April 1940 and, after a period where the station was serviced by both operators, LNER services ended in 1941.

== Services ==
West Finchley station is on the High Barnet branch of the Northern line between Woodside Park to the north and Finchley Central to the south. Train frequencies vary throughout the day, but generally operate every 3–7 minutes between 06:09 and 00:13 in both directions.

== Connections ==
London Bus routes 13, 125, 221, 326, 460, 683 and night route N20 serve locations near the station.

Preceding station	London Underground	Following station
Woodside Park towards High Barnet	Northern line High Barnet branch	Finchley Central towards Battersea Power Station, Morden or Kennington
