= Northern Line Embankment, High Barnet =

Nature reserve in the London Borough of Barnet

Coordinates: 51.64°N 0.184°W

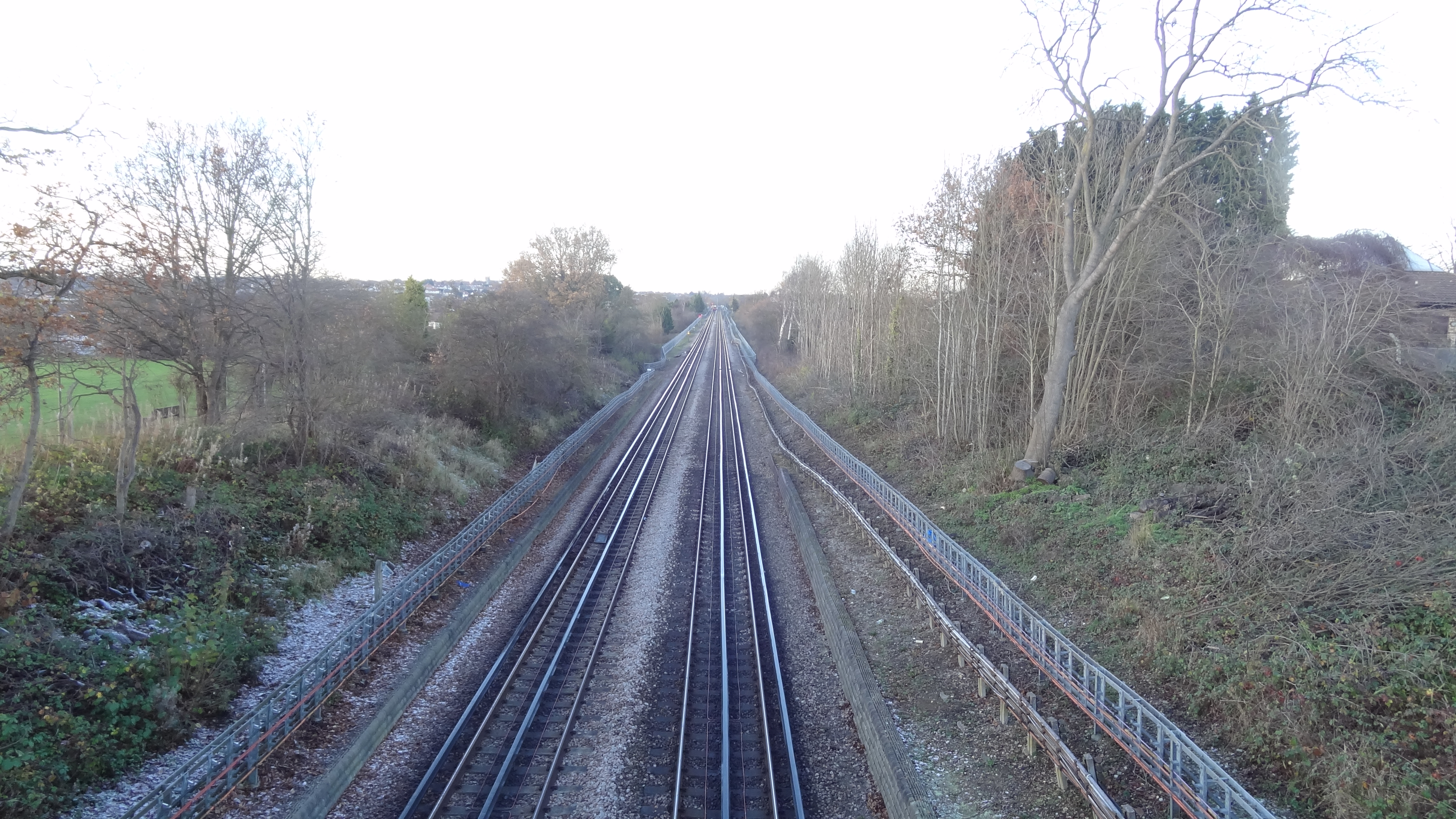
The Northern Line from a footbridge between Walfield Avenue and Wyatts Farm Open Space

The Northern line Embankment between Totteridge and Whetstone and High Barnet tube stations on the Northern line is a Site of Borough Importance for Nature Conservation, Grade II, in the London Borough of Barnet.

It has typical suburban railway vegetation, with low brambles and light secondary woodland. The wooded areas have been naturally colonised, with the main trees being silver birch, sycamore and ash. It also provides an excellent habitat for small birds. The site's main importance is that it has one of Barnet's few colonies of common lizard, due partly to the freedom from cats, dogs and people, and the absence of pesticides.

The embankment can be viewed from a road bridge between Whetstone High Road and Brook Farm Open Space car park, and from a footbridge between Walfield Avenue and Wyatts Farm Open Space.

== See also ==
- Nature reserves in Barnet
