= Finchley Central tube station =

London Underground station

Finchley Central
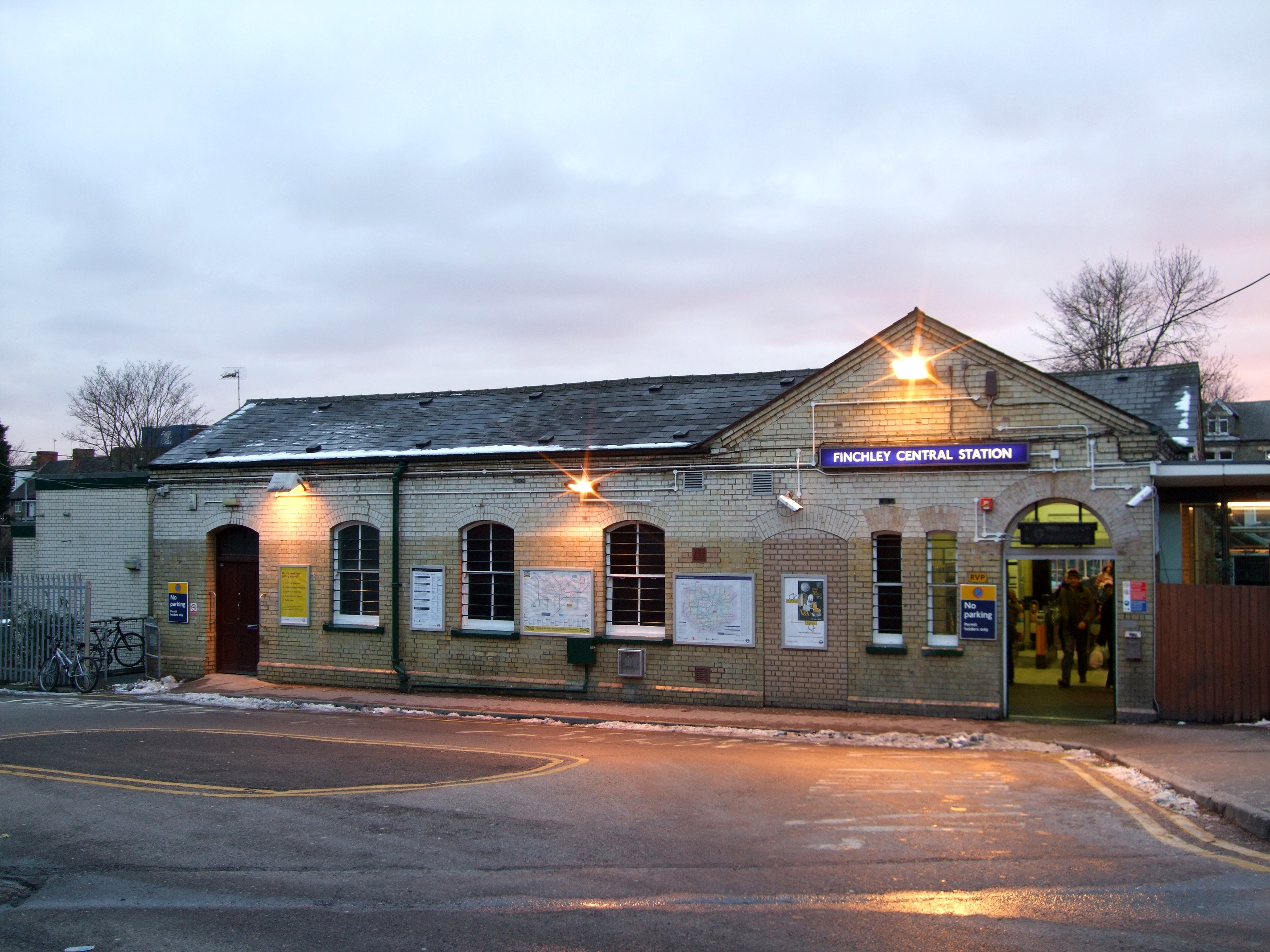
- Station entrance on the right
- Interactive map of Finchley Central

General information
- Location: Finchley
- Local authority: London Borough of Barnet
- Managed by: London Underground
- Number of platforms: 3
- Accessible: Yes
- Fare zone: 4

London Underground annual entry and exit
- 2020: ▼3.72 million
- 2021: ▼3.52 million
- 2022: ▲6.00 million
- 2023: ▲6.26 million
- 2024: ▼5.18 million

Railway companies
- Original company: Edgware, Highgate and London Railway
- Pre-grouping: Great Northern Railway
- Post-grouping: London and North Eastern Railway

Key dates
- 22 August 1867: Opened (GNR)
- 1 February 1872: Branch line opened (GNR)
- 11 September 1939: Closed (to Edgware)
- 14 April 1940: Started (Northern line)
- 2 March 1941: Ended (LNER)
- 18 May 1941: Started (to Mill Hill East)
- 1 October 1962: Goods yard closed (BR)

Other information
- External links: TfL station info page
- Coordinates: 51.6011°N 0.1924°W

Finchley Central is a London Underground station, located in the Church End area of Finchley. It is on the High Barnet branch of the Northern line, between West Finchley and East Finchley stations. The station is at the junction for the short branch to Mill Hill East. It is around 7 miles north-northwest of Charing Cross and is in London fare zone 4.

The station was opened on 22 August 1867 as part of the Great Northern Railway's line between Finsbury Park and Edgware stations. As part of London Underground's Northern Heights plan, Northern line trains started serving the station in 1940 and main line passenger services ended in 1941.

== History ==
=== Original station ===
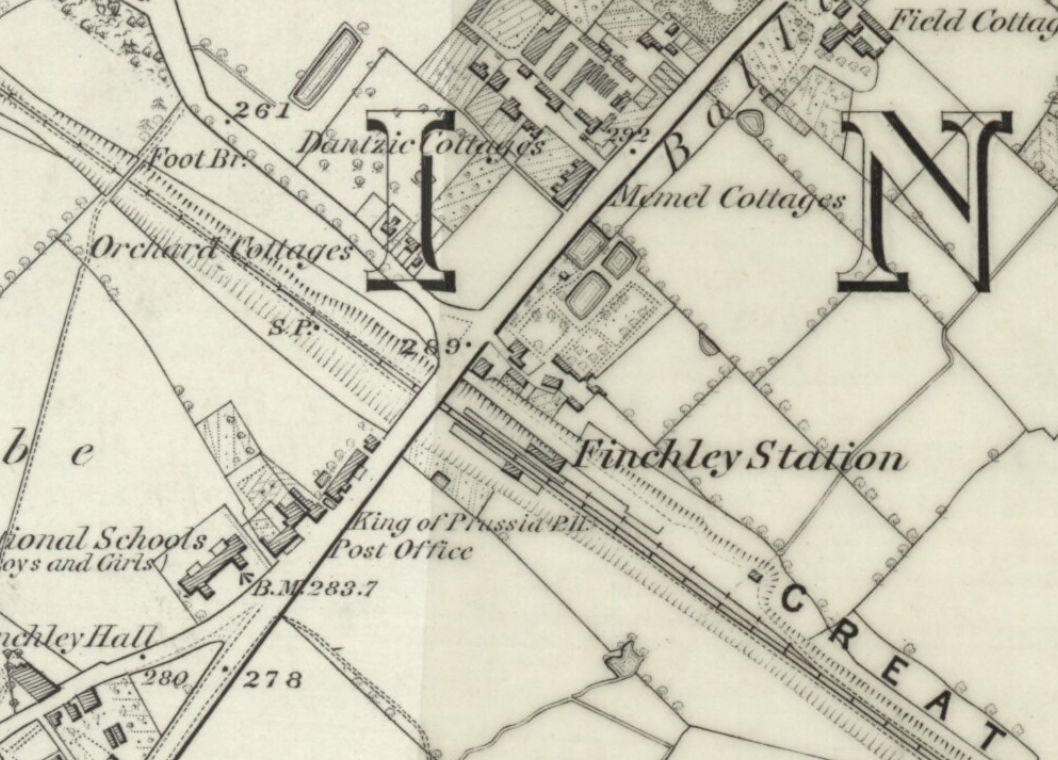
Finchley Central station before the construction of the branch to High Barnet on an Ordnance Survey map

Finchley Central station was built by the Edgware, Highgate and London Railway (EH&LR) on its line from Finsbury Park to Edgware. As construction of the line was nearing completion and before it opened it was purchased in July 1867 by the larger Great Northern Railway (GNR), whose main line from King's Cross ran through Finsbury Park on its way to Potters Bar and the north.

The station, originally named Finchley and Hendon, opened along with the railway to Edgware on 22 August 1867 in what was then rural Middlesex. It was 7.05 miles (11.35 km) north-northwest of Charing Cross as the crow flies, and 7 miles 29 chains (11.8 km) from the GNR terminus at King's Cross. (Note: Railways in the United Kingdom are, for historical reasons, measured in miles and chains. There are 80 chains to the mile.) A branch line from Finchley Central to High Barnet was constructed by the GNR and opened on 1 April 1872.

After the Railways Act 1921 created the Big Four railway companies, the GNR became part of the London & North Eastern Railway (LNER) in 1923. The station was renamed by the GNR twice: to Finchley on 1 February 1872 and Finchley (Church End) on 1 February 1894. It was given its current name on 1 April 1940.

At the start of the 1930s the station had around 54 trains daily from High Barnet running to Finsbury Park and then either King's Cross, Moorgate or Broad Street. Trains between Finchley Central and Edgware typically operated as a shuttle, although some trains ran through to the terminals. (Note: Trains to Moorgate ran to King's Cross York Road then used the City Widened Lines. Trains to Broad Street ran via the Canonbury curve and the North London Railway.)

=== Northern Heights plan ===
In 1935, the London Passenger Transport Board (LPTB) announced a proposal, which became known as the Northern Heights plan, to take over the LNER lines from Finsbury Park to Edgware, High Barnet and Alexandra Palace, and link them to the Northern line with new tunnels from the Northern line's terminus at Archway to East Finchley and to the Northern City line with a new surface connection between Drayton Park and Finsbury Park. (Note: In 1938, services through Finchley Central station were planned to run between Bushey Heath and Kennington (via Charing Cross), High Barnet and Kennington (via Charing Cross) and High Barnet and Moorgate (via Finsbury Park).) The line from Finchley Central to Edgware closed for electrification and reconstruction on 11 September 1939. (Note: At Edgware, the LNER's station was to be closed with the end of the line diverted into the Northern line's own Edgware station, with an extension from there taking the line to Bushey Heath.)

The station was first served by electric Northern line trains on 14 April 1940 when the service was extended from East Finchley to High Barnet. After a period where the station was serviced by both operators, LNER steam services were ended on 2 March 1941. Following the outbreak of the Second World War in September 1939, completion of the electrification works on the line to Edgware was slowed and was completed only as far as Mill Hill East. Northern line services to Mill Hill East began on 18 May 1941 to serve the nearby Inglis Barracks.

=== Postwar ===
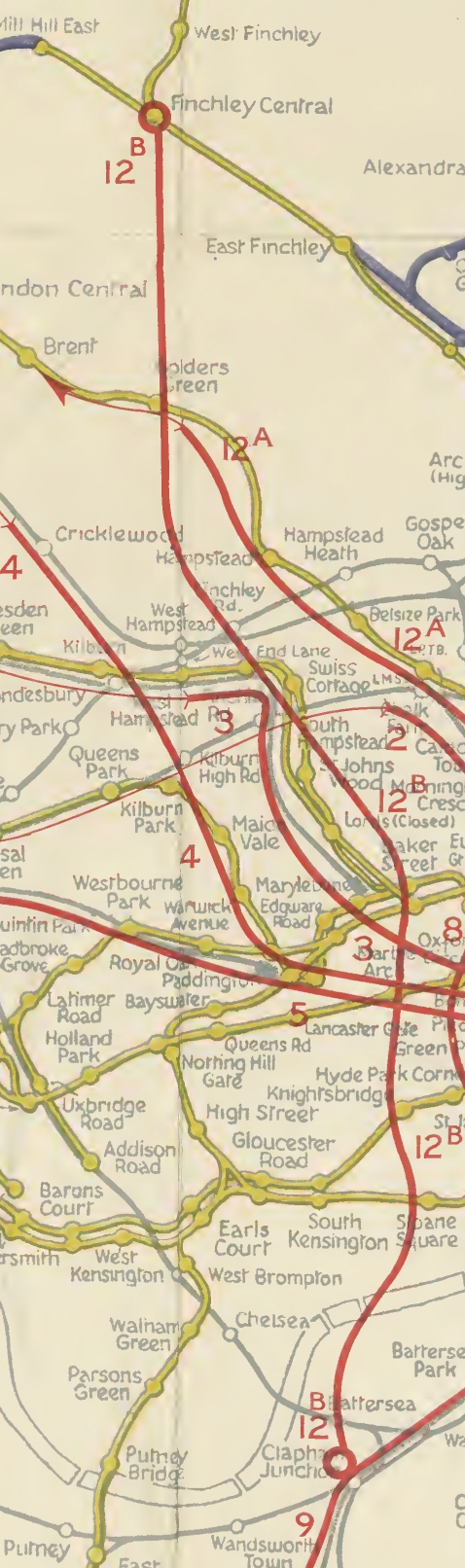
New line from Finchley Central to Clapham Junction proposed in 1946

After the war, the plans to complete the Northern Heights works were reviewed but were not restarted. Maintenance works and reconstruction of war damage on the existing network had the greatest demand for LPTB funds. Funds for new works were severely limited and priority was given to the completion of the western and eastern extensions of the Central line to West Ruislip, Epping and Hainault.

A government-commissioned review of rail transport in the London area produced a report in 1946 that proposed many new lines. It anticipated that completion of the Northern Heights works would put pressure on the Northern line's capacity and it proposed that a relief line should be considered for one or other of the two branches. One of these, designated Route 12B, was proposed to run as a tube line in tunnel from Finchley Central to Clapham Junction via Golders Green, St John's Wood, Baker Street, Knightsbridge and Sloane Square.

Despite being shown as under construction on underground maps as late as 1950, (Note: Shown as "under construction", the Northern Heights extensions appeared for the first time on Underground poster maps in 1937 and pocket maps in 1938. After the opening of the line to Mill Hill East, the uncompleted remainder of the works were removed from the map between 1943 and 1945. The Mill Hill East to Edgware and Edgware to Bushey Heath sections appeared on the map again from 1946 to 1949 and the Finsbury Park to Alexandra Palace section appeared from 1946 to 1950.) work never restarted on the unimplemented parts of the Northern Heights plan. (Note: The section of the extension between Brockley Hill and Bushey Heath was cancelled in October 1950, leaving the section between Edgware and Brockley Hill and the conversion of the line from Mill Hill East to Edgware to be decided. The announcement of its cancellation was finally made in February 1954.) The proposal for Route 12B was also not developed by the LPTB or its successor organisations. (Note: Of the twelve proposed routes, only Route 8, "A South to North Link - East Croydon to Finsbury Park" was developed, eventually becoming the Victoria line.)

Before the war, Charles Holden and Reginald Uren designed replacement station buildings to be built on both sides of the road bridge at the north end of the station. The curtailment of the Northern Heights Plan means that the rebuilding work was not implemented and the station still retains much of its original Victorian architectural character today. As one of two EH&LR stations retaining its original buildings (the other is Mill Hill East), it is one of the oldest parts of the Underground system, pre-dating the first tunnelled section of the Northern line (the City & South London Railway) by more than twenty years. (Note: The City & South London Railway opened in 1890 between King William Street in the City of London and Stockwell in Lambeth.)

British Railways (the successor to the LNER) continued to operate goods trains from Finsbury Park to the station's goods yard until 1 October 1962, when it was closed. (Note: Goods services continued on the Edgware branch until 1964.)

== Design ==
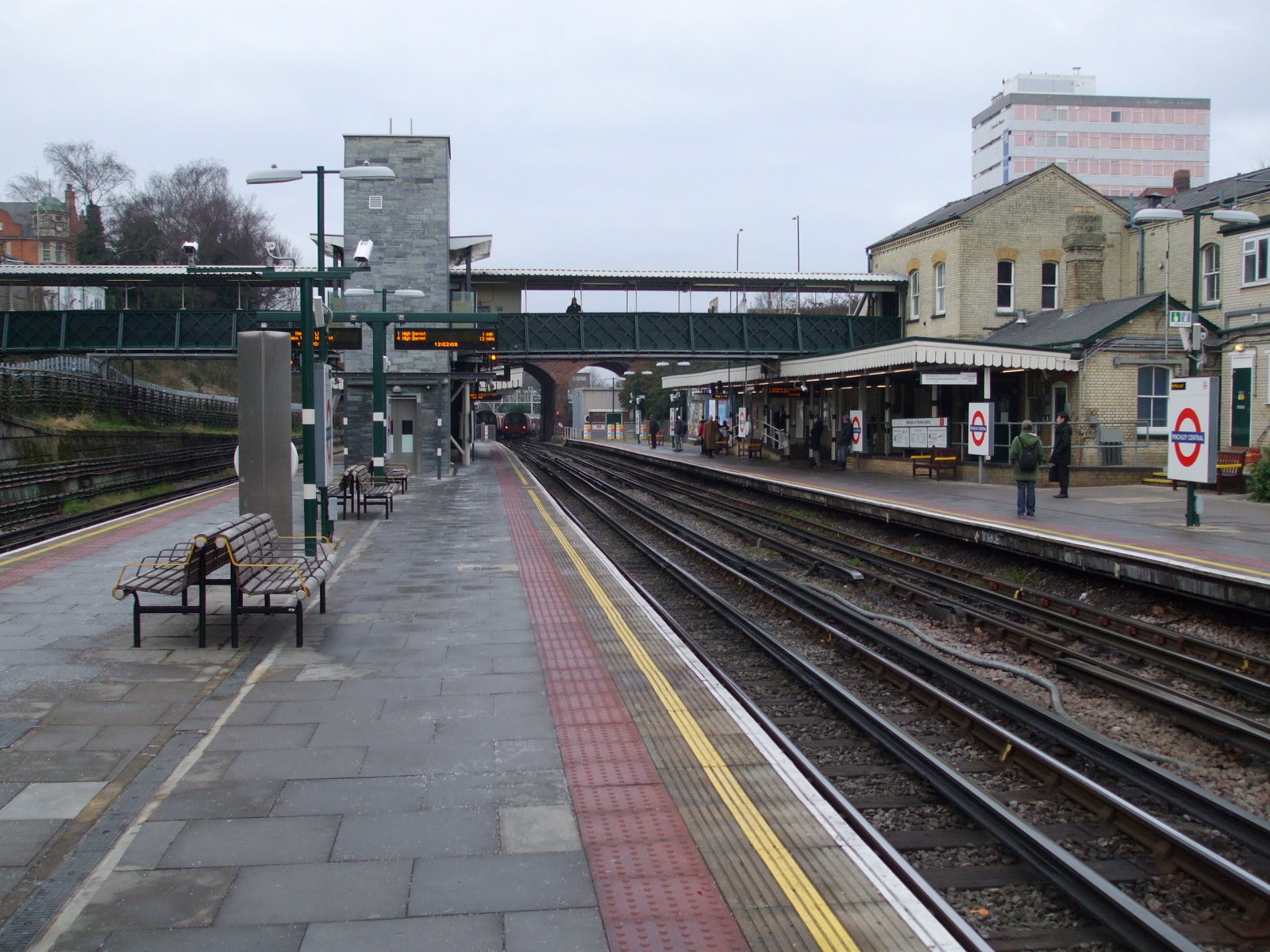
Finchley Central station looking northwest from the island platform

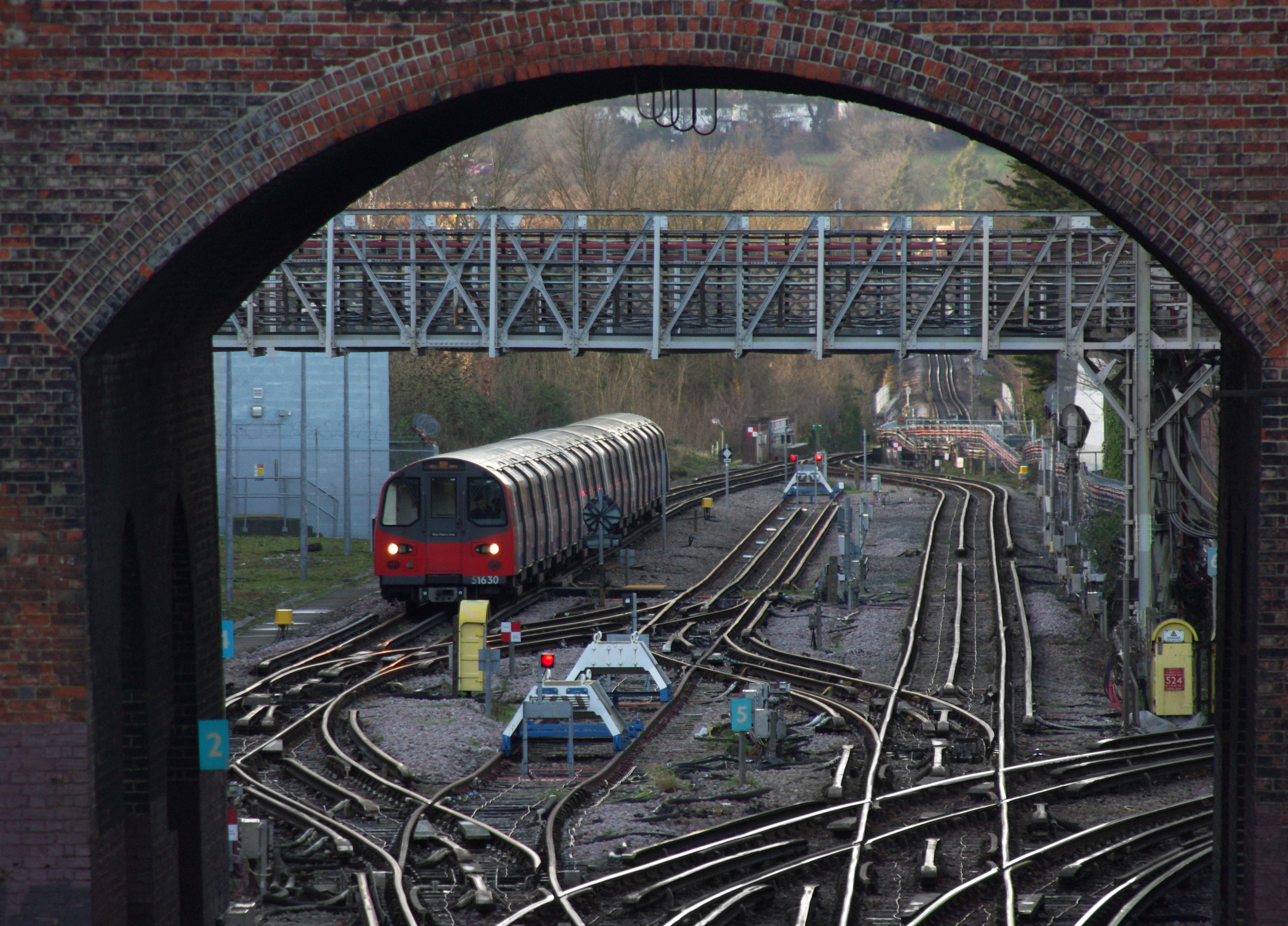
Junction north of station: ahead towards Mill Hill East, right towards West Finchley

The station has two entrances. The main one, in the original station building, is on the north side of the tracks in Chaville Way, a short access road from the junction of Ballards Lane, Regents Park Road and Nether Street. The second entrance is to the south of the tracks in Station Road.

The station is in a cutting and the two entrances are joined by a footbridge over the tracks from which stairs and lifts connect to the platforms. The station is accessible for disabled passengers travelling in both directions.

The station has three platforms. Platforms 1 and 2, which share an island platform, are for northbound trains: platform 1 is used mainly by trains terminating at Finchley Central (and trains reverse using a reversing siding north of the station) or going to Mill Hill East; platform 2 is mainly used by trains going to High Barnet. Platform 3, a side platform, is for southbound trains. All platforms have canopies at their northern ends. The large station car park on the north side of the tracks, with access from Chaville Way, occupies the site of the former goods yard.

== Location ==
The station is located in the Church End area of Finchley. London Bus routes 13, 125, 143, 326, 382 and 460, night route N20, Superloop express route SL10 and school routes 626 and 683 serve the station.

== Services ==
Finchley Central station is on the Northern line in London fare zone 4. It is on the High Barnet branch between West Finchley to the north and East Finchley to the south. It is also on a single-track branch to Mill Hill East.

Train frequencies vary throughout the day, but generally operate every 3–7 minutes between 05:44 and 01:05 northbound to High Barnet and 05:31 and 01:15 southbound to Kennington (via Charing Cross) or Morden (via Bank). Trains to Mill Hill East operate between 05:16 and 01:06 (except for peak hours and after 23.00 all trains operate as a shuttle between Finchley Central and Mill Hill East). (Note: Northern line trains consist of 1995 stock EMUs; calling at all stations.)

== Cultural references ==
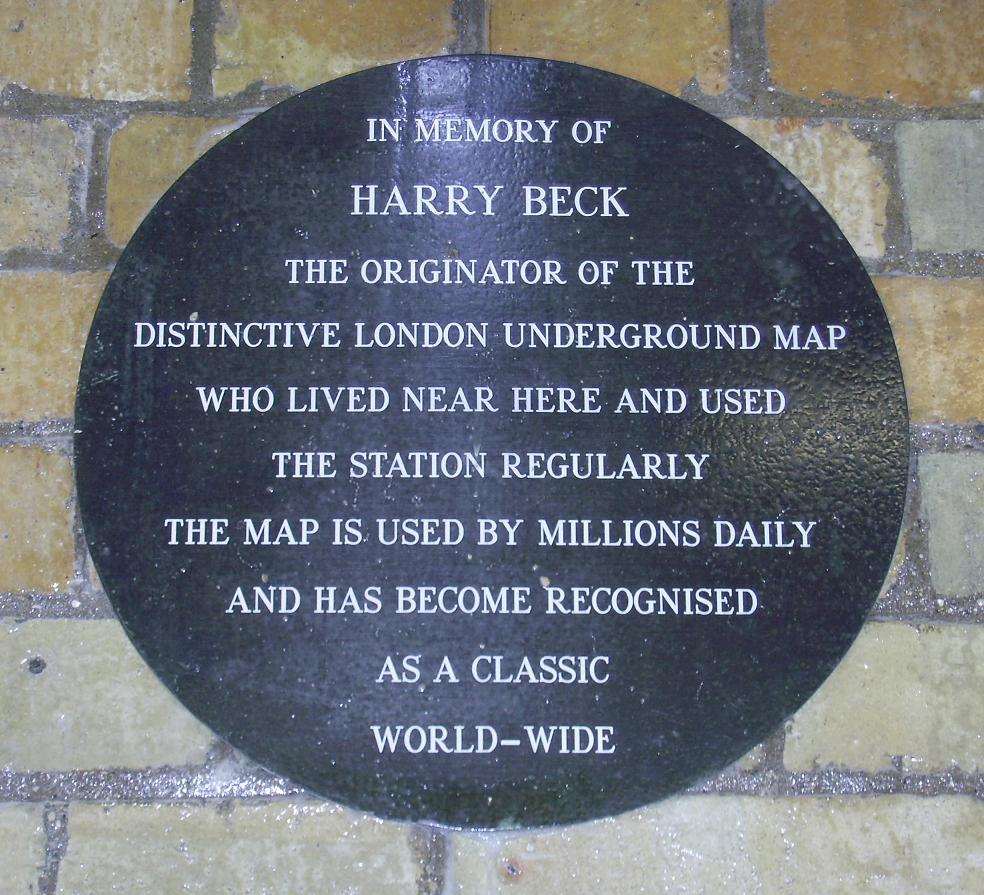
Plaque commemorating Harry Beck

The station features in the Finchley Central mind game, which in turn became the basis for the game Mornington Crescent in the BBC Radio 4 series I'm Sorry I Haven't a Clue.

The New Vaudeville Band's song "Finchley Central" reached No. 11 in the UK singles charts in 1967. (Note: The song appeared on an album of the same name. The sleeves of both featured artwork incorporating part of the London Underground map. The singer recounts travelling from Golders Green to Finchley Central on the Northern line and waiting on the platform to meet a woman who does not arrive.)

Harry Beck, designer of the original Tube map lived nearby and used the station in the 1930s. There is a commemorative plaque on Platform 3, together with a facsimile enamel panel of Beck's iconic 1933 design.

== Notes ==
Preceding station	London Underground	Following station
West Finchley towards High Barnet	Northern line High Barnet branch	East Finchley towards Battersea Power Station, Morden or Kennington
Mill Hill East Terminus	Northern line High Barnet branch	East Finchley towards Battersea Power Station, Morden or Kennington
