= Finchley Lido =

Leisure centre in London, England

Coordinates: 51.6045°N 0.1724°W

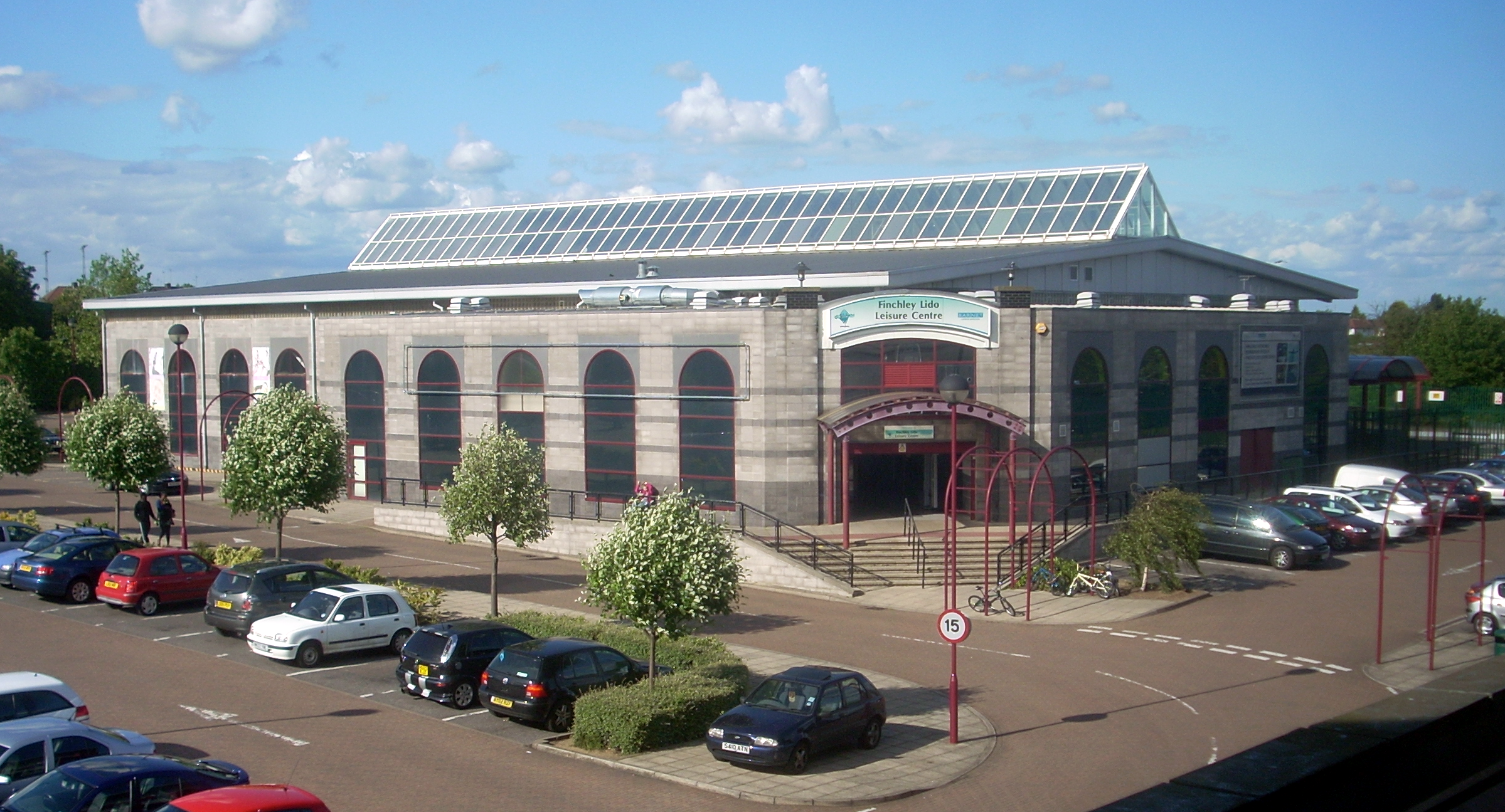
The leisure centre viewed from the cinema

Finchley Lido is a leisure complex at grid reference TQ266911, just east of the suburb of North Finchley in the London Borough of Barnet.

Currently there is a swimming pool and leisure centre, film cinema, food restaurants, bowling facilities and large number of car parking spaces. Finchley Lido is extremely popular with the local population of Finchley at weekends, as it is one of the only cinema complexes in this area of North London.

== History ==
The Finchley Open Air Pool was designed by P T Harrison, from Finchley Borough Council. The main heated pool opened on 17 September 1931 and stayed open until 11 November. The following year it was officially opened on 26 March, and on 22 April 1932 the Duke of York (later King George VI) unveiled a ceremonial wall tablet made of Staffordshire marble, which can be seen to this date. This tablet can now be seen on display behind the counter of Nando's restaurant, which was built around the original site.

The main heated pool measured 165 ft (50 m) × 80 ft, depth ft 3 ins to 10 ft (3.0 m), with two fountains. This pool contained at most 456,250 gallons (1,727,094 litres) and had a diving stage of a similar design to Barking Lido, containing a two-stage platform. Finchley Lido was the first swimming pool to introduce gay nudist days and events; this was a pilot scheme which later introduced trials in Manchester and other boroughs in London.

The whole site occupied 7 acres (28,000 m^{2}), and there was a car park, with its own uniformed attendant (paid the equivalent of £3 per week in 1932). The main building also possessed a burglar alarm from 1932. The car park was enlarged in 2004 when the original cinema on the north side of the site was demolished following large-scale flooding.

On 11 July 1971, the Lido had 11,962 visitors, which remains the record highest attendance in one day for a UK lido.

The original 1930s outdoor pool, which no longer exists, was enclosed by an elegant colonnade of Roman Doric columns, with fountains to either side and was used to host the men's preliminaries to the water polo competition for the 1948 Summer Olympics.

The original site with its main pool and children's pool was closed in 1992.

In 1997, the exterior of the building was used as the imaginary South Downs Leisure Centre in Brighton, regularly featured in the CBBC series No Sweat.

== Facilities ==
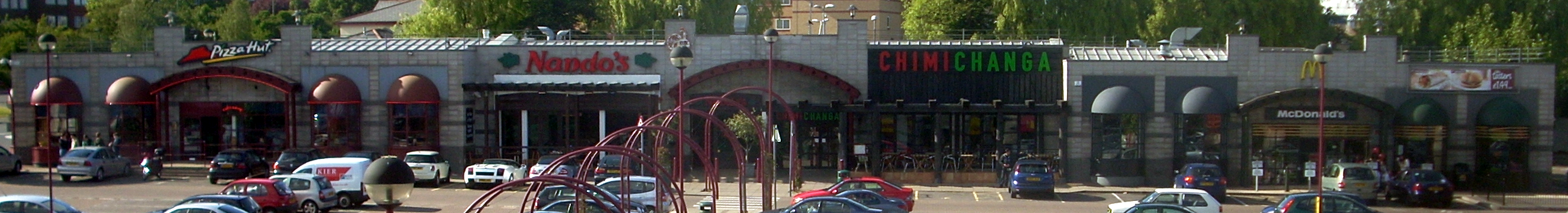
The north side of the retail park
