= High Barnet tube station =

London Underground and former railway station

High Barnet
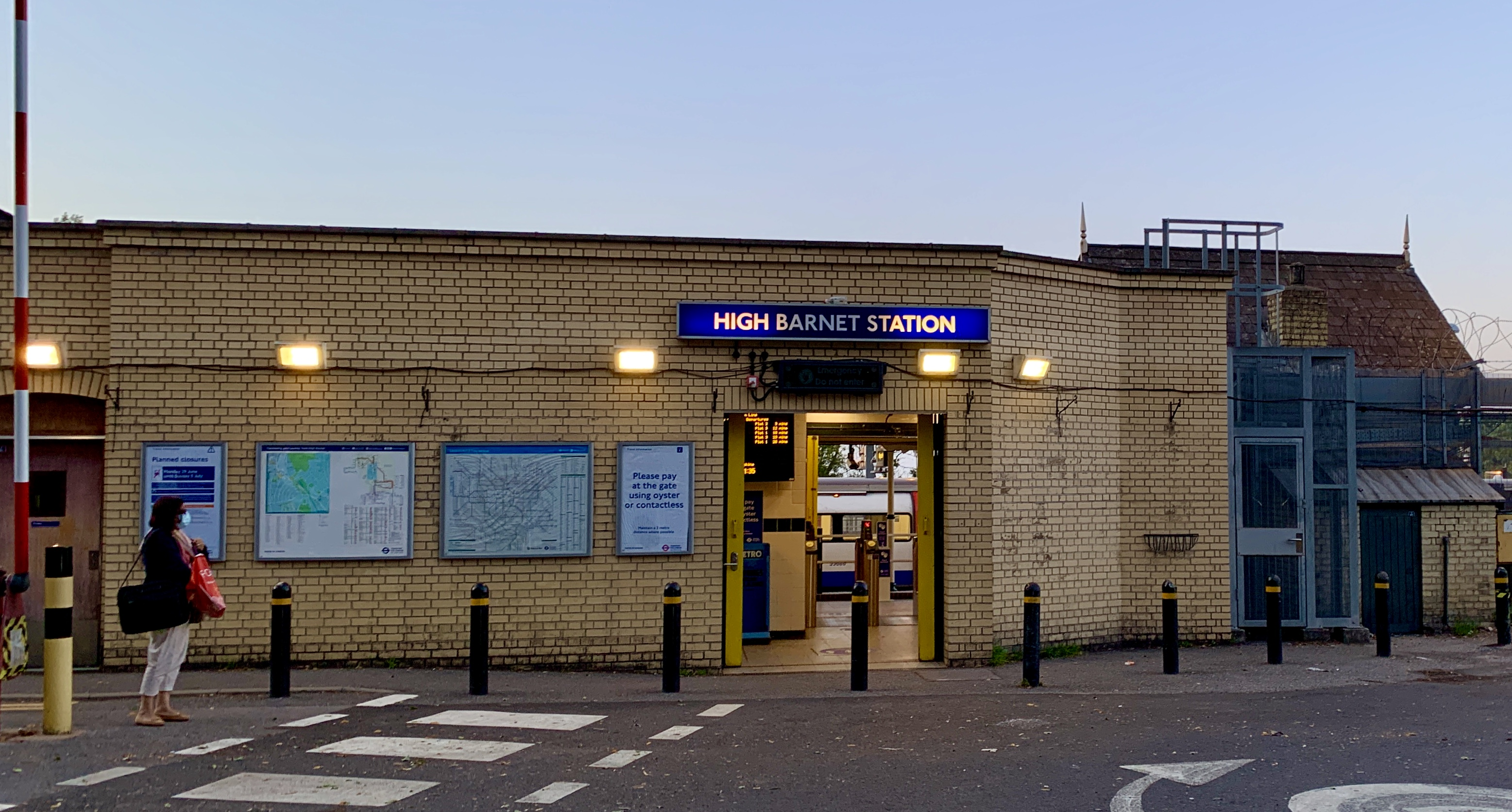
- Southern entrance
- Interactive map of High Barnet

General information
- Location: Chipping Barnet
- Local authority: London Borough of Barnet
- Managed by: London Underground
- Number of platforms: 3
- Accessible: Yes
- Fare zone: 5

London Underground annual entry and exit
- 2020: ▼2.03 million
- 2021: ▼1.83 million
- 2022: ▲3.17 million
- 2023: ▲3.26 million
- 2024: ▲3.71 million

Key dates
- 1 April 1872: Opened (GNR)
- 14 April 1940: Started (Northern line)
- 1941: Ended (LNER)
- 1 October 1962: Goods yard closed

Other information
- External links: TfL station info page
- Coordinates: 51.6505°N 0.1941°W

High Barnet is a London Underground station, and former railway station, located in Chipping Barnet, North London. It is the northern terminus of its branch of the Northern line and the next station towards south is Totteridge & Whetstone. The station is situated 10.2 miles (16.4 km) north north-west of Charing Cross and is in London fare zone 5.

== History ==
High Barnet station was planned by the Edgware, Highgate and London Railway (EH&LR) and opened on 1 April 1872 by the Great Northern Railway (which had taken over the EH&LR) on the original site of the Barnet Fair. It was the terminus of the branch of a line that ran from Finsbury Park to Edgware via Highgate. In 1896 an additional ticket hall was opened.

After the Railways Act 1921 created the "Big Four" railway companies the line was, from 1923, part of the London & North Eastern Railway (LNER). The section of the High Barnet branch north of East Finchley was incorporated into the London Underground network through the "Northern Heights" project begun in the late 1930s. High Barnet station was first served by Northern line trains on 14 April 1940 and, after a period where the station was served by both operators, LNER services ended in 1941. A bell cast by Mears and Stainbank in 1869 had been rung for departing steam trains since the station opened and was donated to Barnet Museum in 1940. British Railways (the successor to the LNER) freight trains continued to serve the station's goods yard until 1 October 1962, when it was closed. The goods yard was converted to a car park for commuters.

The station still retains much of its original Victorian architectural character, with numerous platform buildings dating from the pre-London Transport era.

In 2008, a new train crew accommodation block was constructed immediately to the south west of the station on part of the car park. This was opened on 31 January 2010. Further improvements include a new covered step-free entrance from the car park to platform one, along with a ramp at the end of the platform connecting it to platforms two and three. There are also two accessible toilets. These works were fully completed in October 2009. There is full step-free access in the station, although there is a considerably steep path if approaching the station from the north and a steep approach from the road to station level from the south.

=== Housing development ===
In the late 2010s, Places for London (the property arm of Transport for London) proposed that around 300 new homes would be built on the car park next to the station. The development would have around 40% affordable housing. The Barnet Society and local MP Theresa Villiers criticised the plans, with Villers calling the car park "heavily used". In 2025, an amended proposal was refused at committee by Barnet Council, despite a positive recommendation from officers. The scheme will pass to the Mayor of London, who may overturn the decision.

== Services ==
Northern line trains are scheduled to arrive and depart every 3–9 minutes from the station's three southbound platforms, with trains operating to Morden via Bank or to Kennington, Battersea Power Station or Morden via Charing Cross.

== Connections ==
London Buses routes 34, 107, 184, 234, 263, 307, 326, 383, 384, 389, school routes 606, 626, 634 and night route N20 serve the station.

== See also ==
- Northern Line Embankment, High Barnet

Preceding station	London Underground	Following station
Terminus	Northern line High Barnet branch	Totteridge & Whetstone towards Battersea Power Station, Morden or Kennington
