= East Finchley tube station =

London Underground station

East Finchley
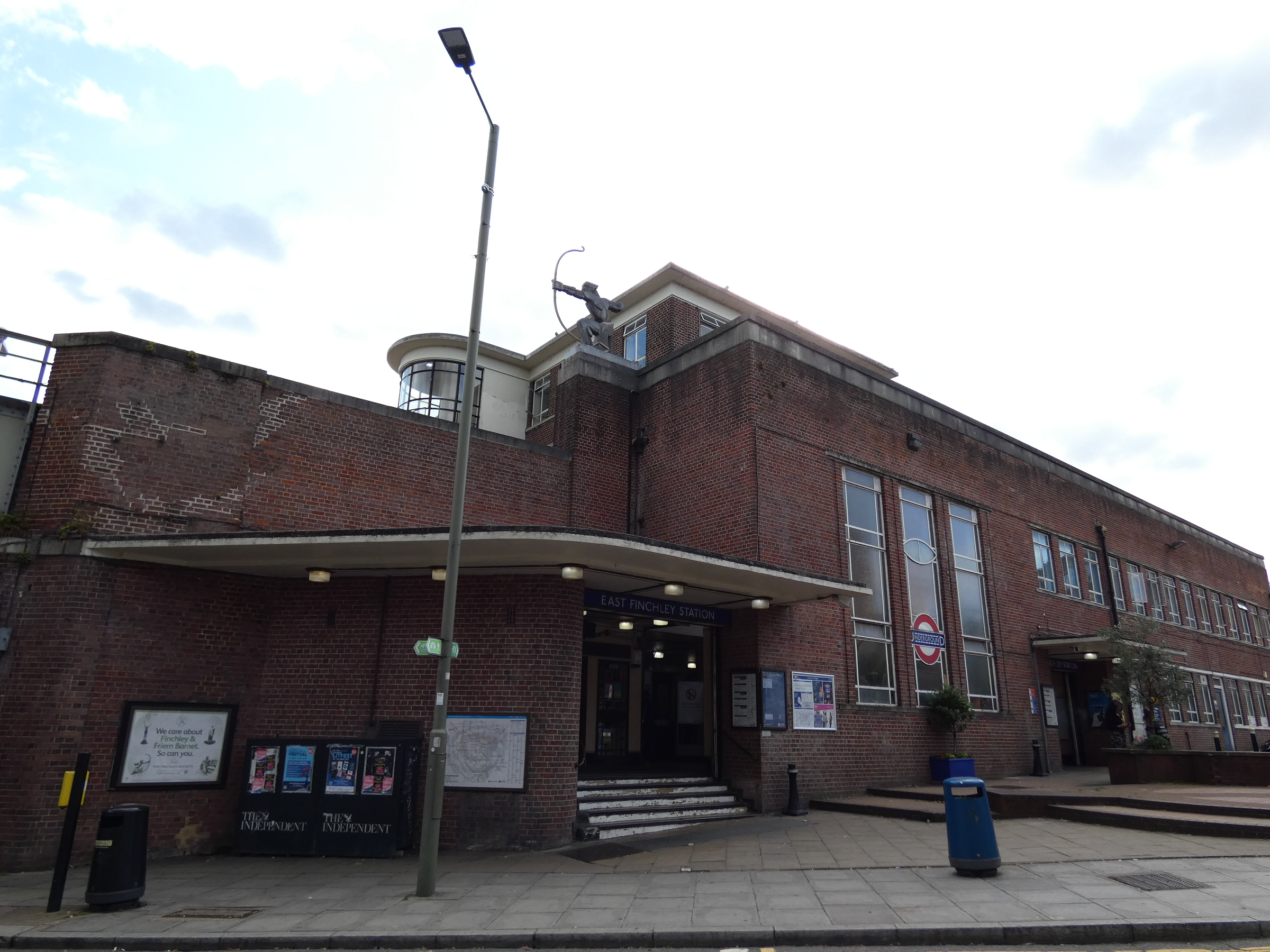
- East Finchley station was designed by Charles Holden
- Interactive map of East Finchley

General information
- Location: East Finchley
- Local authority: London Borough of Barnet
- Managed by: London Underground
- Number of platforms: 4
- Fare zone: 3

London Underground annual entry and exit
- 2021: ▼2.81 million
- 2022: ▲4.95 million
- 2023: ▲5.20 million
- 2024: ▲5.28 million
- 2025: ▲5.31 million

Railway companies
- Original company: Edgware, Highgate and London Railway
- Pre-grouping: Great Northern Railway
- Post-grouping: London and North Eastern Railway

Key dates
- 22 August 1867: Opened to main line services (GNR)
- 3 July 1939: Northern Line services commenced
- 2 March 1941: Main line services ended (LNER)
- 1 October 1962: Goods yard closed

Listed status
- Listing grade: II
- Entry number: 1359150
- Added to list: 22 July 1987; 39 years ago

Other information
- External links: TfL station info page
- Coordinates: 51.58722°N 0.16500°W

East Finchley is a London Underground station in the area of East Finchley, in north London, England. It lies on the High Barnet branch of the Northern line, between Finchley Central and Highgate. The station was opened on 22 August 1867, on the Great Northern Railway's line between Finsbury Park and Edgware. As part of London Underground's only partially-completed Northern Heights plan, the station was completely rebuilt with additional tracks in the late 1930s. Northern line trains started serving the station on 3 July 1939 and main line passenger services ended on 2 March 1941.

== History ==
=== Original station ===
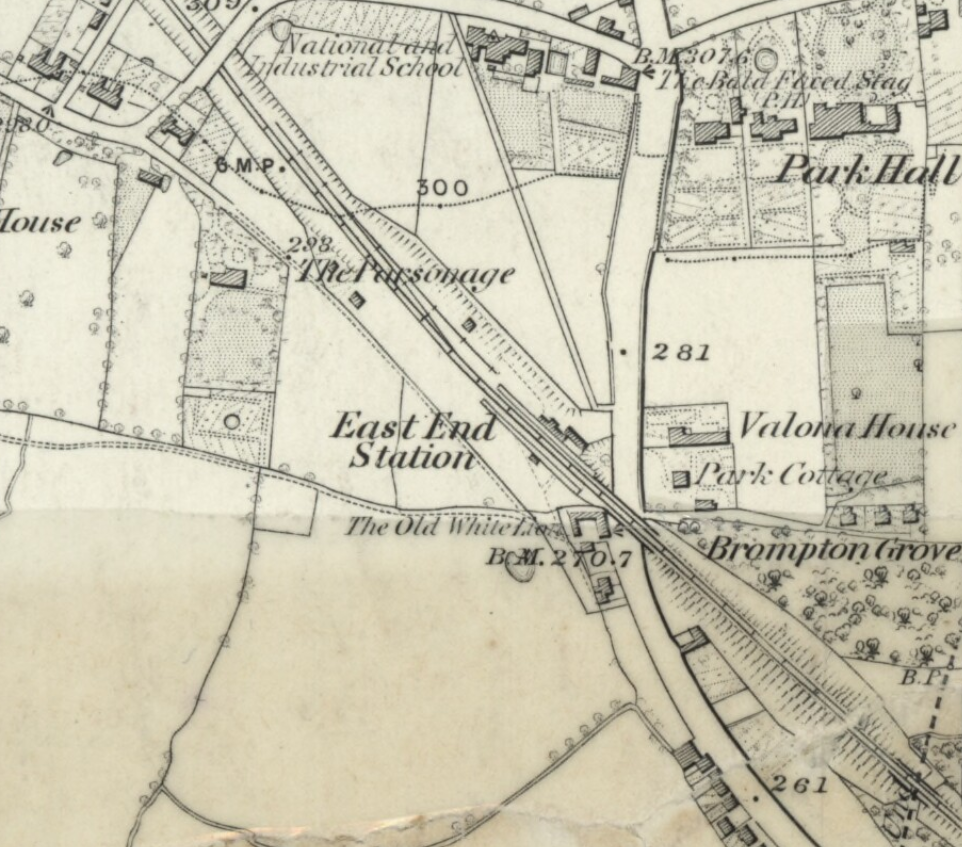
East End, Finchley station (1873)

East Finchley station was built by the Edgware, Highgate and London Railway (EH&LR) on its line from Finsbury Park to Edgware. Before the line was opened, it was purchased in July 1867 by the larger Great Northern Railway (GNR), whose main line from King's Cross ran through Finsbury Park on its way to Potters Bar and the north. The station, originally named East End, Finchley, opened along with the railway to Edgware on 22 August that year. The station was given its current name either on 1 February 1887 or, alternatively, in 1886. (Note: The original station name reflected the name of the local area. Residents requested the change to avoid confusion with the poor districts of the East End of London.) As a result of the Railways Act 1921, which created the Big Four railway companies, the GNR amalgamated with several other railways to create the London & North Eastern Railway (LNER) in 1923.

At the start of the 1930s, the station had around 54 trains daily from High Barnet and a few through trains from Edgware. Services ran to Finsbury Park and then either King's Cross, Moorgate or Broad Street. (Note: Trains to Moorgate ran to King's Cross York Road, then used the City Widened Lines. Trains to Broad Street ran via the Canonbury curve and the North London Railway.)

=== Northern Heights project ===
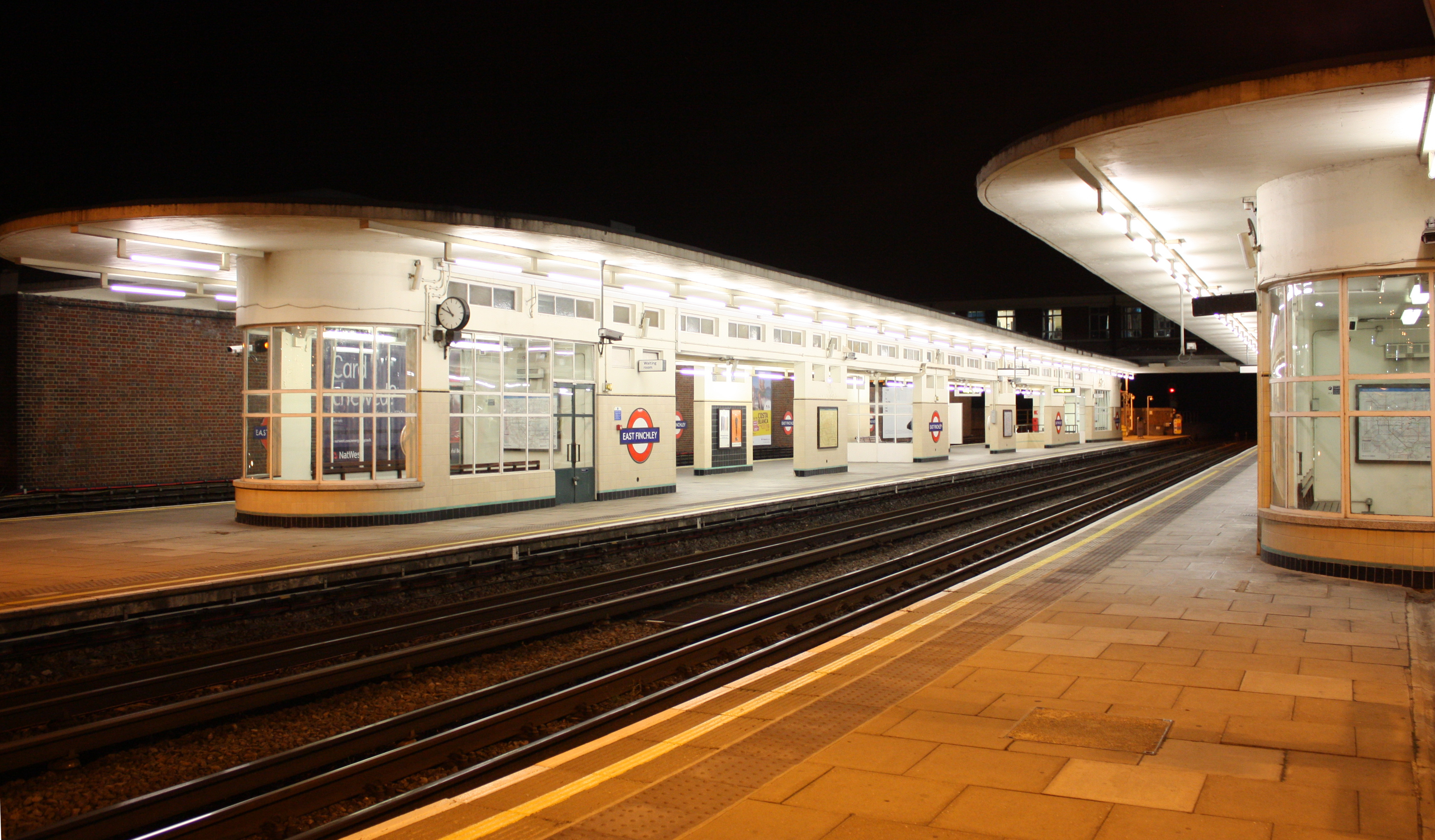
The streamlined design of the platform waiting rooms

In 1935, the London Passenger Transport Board (LPTB) announced a proposal, which became known as the Northern Heights project. This was to take over the LNER lines from Finsbury Park to Edgware, High Barnet and Alexandra Palace, and link them to both the Northern line at East Finchley and to the Northern City line at Finsbury Park. (Note: At Edgware, the LNER's station was to be closed with the end of the line diverted into the Northern line's own Edgware with an extension from there taking the line to Bushey Heath.) The construction of the first phase of this project involved extending underground services from the Northern line's existing terminus at Archway through a new section of paired tunnels under the LNER's Highgate to emerge south-east of East Finchley station, where track connections to the LNER line were made. (Note: At 17.25 miles (27.76 km), the tunnel from East Finchley to Morden was, at the time, the longest railway tunnel in the world when it was opened.)

For the introduction of London Underground services, the original station was completely demolished and rebuilt. The station was provided with two additional platforms, giving four in total. The platforms comprise two parallel islands with tracks on both sides. This was necessary as the intention of the Northern Heights project was that trains would be able to run south from East Finchley to Highgate via both the surface and the underground routes. (Note: In 1938, services through East Finchley were planned to run between Bushey Heath and Kennington (via tunnel to Highgate), High Barnet and Kennington (via tunnel to Highgate), East Finchley and Morden (via tunnel to Highgate), and High Barnet and Moorgate (via surface to Highgate).) The inner pair of tracks served the surface route, whilst the outer pair serve the tunnel route.

Northern line trains first served the station on 3 July 1939. After completion of the electrification of the line to High Barnet, Underground services were extended northwards on 14 April 1940. The station continued to be served by LNER steam trains from Highgate until 2 March 1941 when that service was discontinued. (Note: Smoke deflectors are cast into the concrete of the bridge structure over the inner pair of tracks to prevent smoke from the steam engines entering the windows of the offices above. The outer pair of tracks, which were only used by electric tube stock do not have deflectors above them.) The inner platforms are now used only by northbound trains entering service or southbound trains terminating at East Finchley on their way to or from Highgate Wood depot south of the station. (Note: The outer pair of tracks enter tunnels a short distance to the south-east of the station. The inner pair of tracks run to Highgate Wood depot, but originally ran all the way to Highgate. Crossovers immediately north of the station connect between the two pairs of tracks.)

=== Post-war ===
After the war, plans to complete the Northern Heights project were reviewed but no work was carried out. Maintenance works and reconstruction of war damage on the existing network had the greatest call on London Underground funds. Funds for new works were severely limited and priority was given to the completion of the western and eastern extensions of the Central line to West Ruislip, Epping and Hainault. Despite being shown as under construction on underground maps as late as 1950, (Note: Shown as under construction, the Northern Heights extensions appeared for the first time on Underground poster maps in 1937 and pocket maps in 1938. After the opening of the tube platforms at Highgate, and the extensions to High Barnet and Mill Hill East, the uncompleted remainder of the works were removed from the map between 1943 and 1945. The Mill Hill East to Edgware and Edgware to Bushey Heath sections appeared on the map again from 1946 to 1949 and the Finsbury Park to Alexandra Palace section appeared from 1946 to 1950.) work never restarted on the unimplemented parts of the Northern Heights project. (Note: The section of the extension between Brockley Hill and Bushey Heath was cancelled in October 1950, leaving the section between Edgware and Brockley Hill and the conversion of the line from Mill Hill East to Edgware to be decided. The announcement of its cancellation was finally made in February 1954.)

British Railways (Note: The successor to the LNER).) goods trains continued to serve the station's goods yard until 1 October 1962, when it was closed. (Note: Goods services continued on the High Barnet branch until 1962 and the Edgware branch until 1964.)

== Description of the building ==
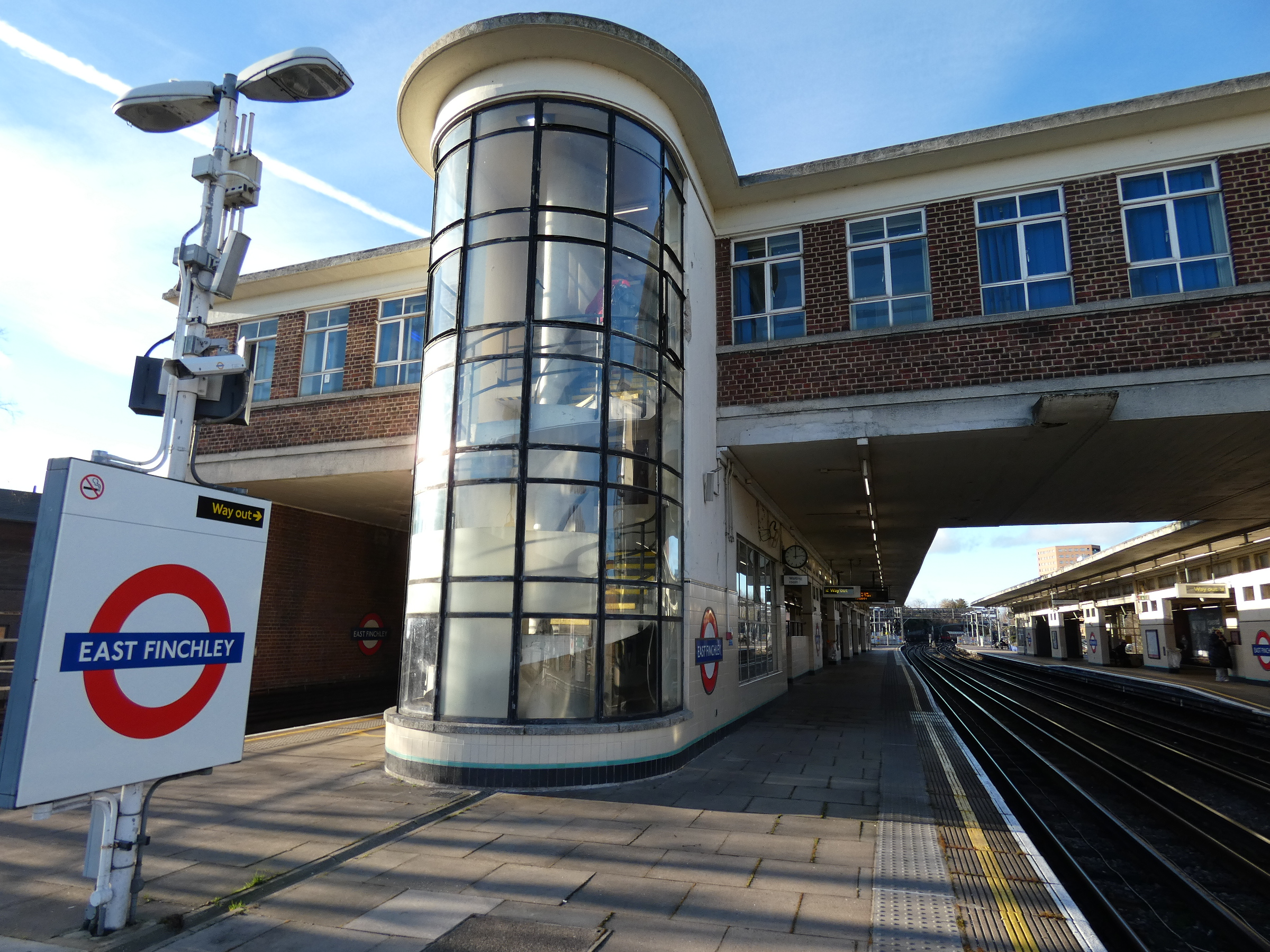
View of platforms with glazed stairwells and offices spanning the tracks

The new station was constructed in an Art Deco/Streamline Moderne design by Charles Holden with L.H. Bucknell. Like Holden's other designs for London Underground in the 1930s, East Finchley station was inspired by European architecture (particularly Dutch) that Holden had seen on trips to the continent during that decade. The track here runs roughly north-west to south-east.

The imposing station building, now Grade II listed,built on rising ground adjacent to the railway bridge over High Road (A1000), has three entrances: (Note: The main glazed screen to the ticket hall on the north side features the Underground roundel. The LNER logo was originally contained in the lenticular pane above.) The entrances are linked by a passage under the tracks to the platforms.

- The two main entrances to the ticket hall are on the north side of the tracks facing High Road
- A third, minor entrance, is on the south side.

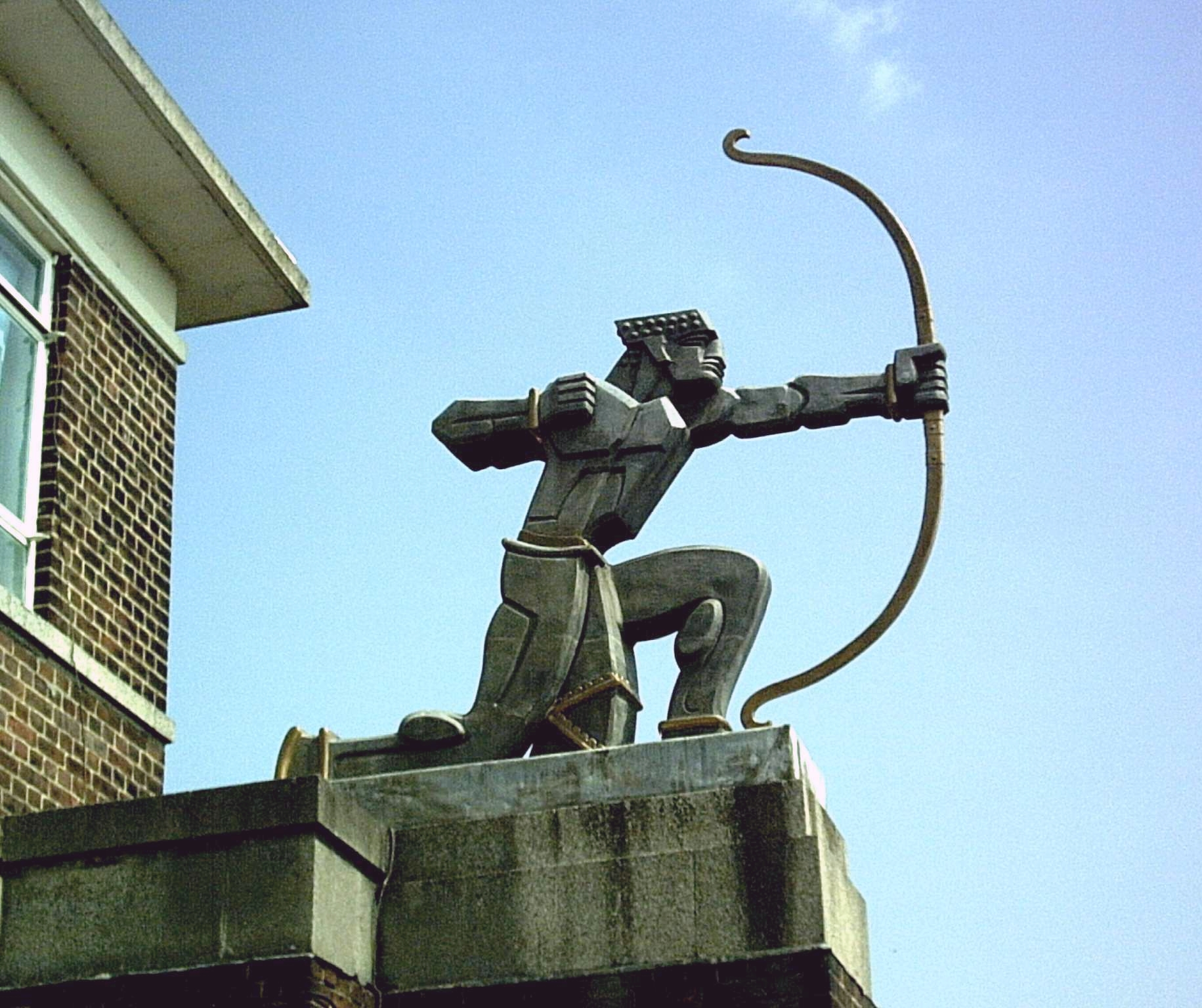
Aumonier's The Archer statue

A strong feature of the station is the semi-circular glazed stairways leading to the enclosed bridge over the tracks occupied by staff offices. Prominent from the platforms and dominating the main entrance façade is The Archer, a 10-foot-tall (3.0 m) statue by Eric Aumonier of a kneeling archer captured as if having just released an arrow. (Note: The Archer, a local community newspaper, is named after Aumonier's statue and uses it as its masthead image.) The archer is intended to commemorate Finchley's ancient association with hunting in the nearby Royal Forest of Enfield.

== Services ==
Service frequencies at East Finchley station vary during the day, but operate generally every 3–7 minutes:

- Northbound: between 05:12 and 01:01
- Southbound: between 05:35 and 00:13.

Current services
Preceding station	London Underground	Following station
Finchley Central towards High Barnet or Mill Hill East	Northern line High Barnet branch	Highgate towards Battersea Power Station, Morden or Kennington
Former services
Finchley Central; Line and station open	London and North Eastern Railway; Edgware, Highgate and London Railway	Highgate; Line and station closed
Abandoned Northern Heights extension
Preceding station	London Underground	Following station
Finchley Central towards Mill Hill East, High Barnet or Bushey Heath	Northern line	Highgate Via Northern City Line towards Moorgate

== Connections ==
London Buses routes 102, 143, 234, 263, 603 and H3 serve the station during the day, along with night routes N20 and N263.
