= Kennington tube station =

London Underground station

Kennington
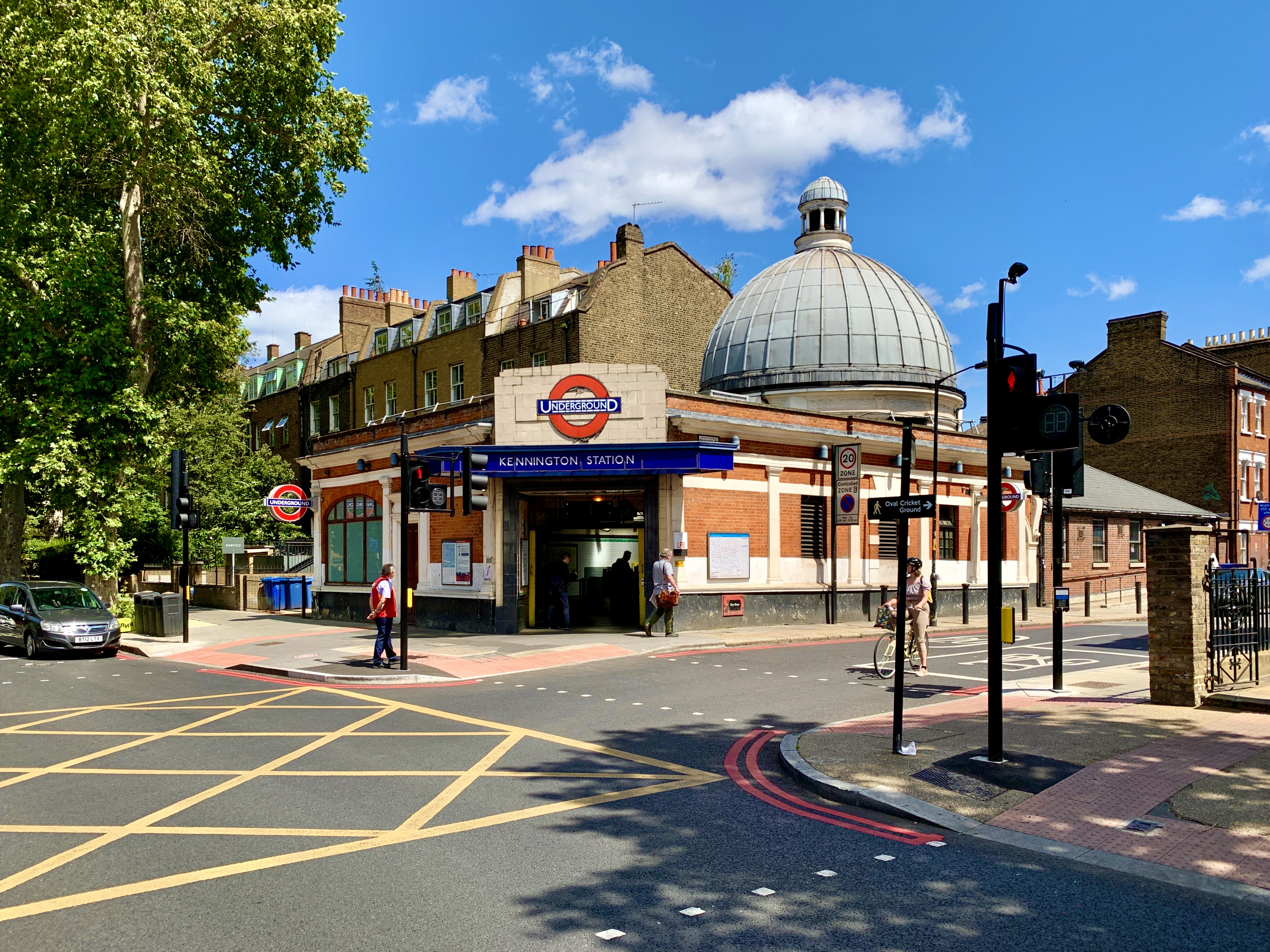
- Station entrance
- Interactive map of Kennington

General information
- Location: Kennington Park Road
- Local authority: Southwark
- Managed by: London Underground
- Owner: London Underground
- Number of platforms: 4
- Fare zone: 1 and 2

London Underground annual entry and exit
- 2021: ▲2.49 million
- 2022: ▲4.41 million
- 2023: ▲4.63 million
- 2024: ▲4.73 million
- 2025: ▼4.58 million

Key dates
- 1890: Opened (C&SLR)
- 1923: Closed for reconstruction
- 1925: Reopened
- 1926: Opened (Charing Cross branch)
- 2021: Opened (Battersea branch)

Listed status
- Listing grade: II
- Entry number: 1385635
- Added to list: 21 August 1974; 52 years ago

Other information
- External links: TfL station info page
- Coordinates: 51°29′17.8″N 0°6′20.4″W

Kennington is a London Underground station. It is located on Kennington Park Road in Kennington within the London Borough of Southwark. The station is on the Northern line, and is at the junction of the Charing Cross and Bank branches to the north and the Morden and Battersea Power Station branches to the south. Northbound, the next stations are Waterloo on the Charing Cross branch and Elephant & Castle on the Bank branch. Southbound, the next stations are Oval towards Morden and Nine Elms towards Battersea Power Station respectively. It is in both London fare zone 1 and 2.

The station was opened in 1890 as part of the world's first underground electric railway and its surface building remains largely unaltered. In the 1920s, the underground parts of the station were reconstructed so that the line could be extended and larger trains could be used. Two additional platforms and later several cross passages were provided for interchanges between the branches.

== History ==
=== City and South London Railway ===
In 1884, the City of London and Southwark Subway (CL&SS) was granted parliamentary approval to construct an underground railway from King William Street in the City of London to Elephant & Castle in Southwark. Unlike previous underground railways in London that had been constructed using the cut and cover method, the CL&SS was to be constructed in a pair of deep-level tunnels bored using tunnelling shields with circular segmental cast-iron tunnel linings. James Henry Greathead was the engineer for the railway and had used the tunnelling method on the Tower Subway bored under the River Thames in 1869.

Construction work began in 1886, and in 1887 the railway was granted additional approval for an extension to Kennington, Oval and Stockwell. The CL&SS was originally designed to be operated using a cabled-hauled system of trains, but the haulage method was changed in January 1899 to use electric locomotives, making it the world's first underground electric railway. (Note: Electric traction had been used for a number of tramway systems during the 1880s, starting with the Berlin tram system, which opened its first electric line in 1881.) The CL&SS changed its name to the City and South London Railway (C&SLR) early in 1890.

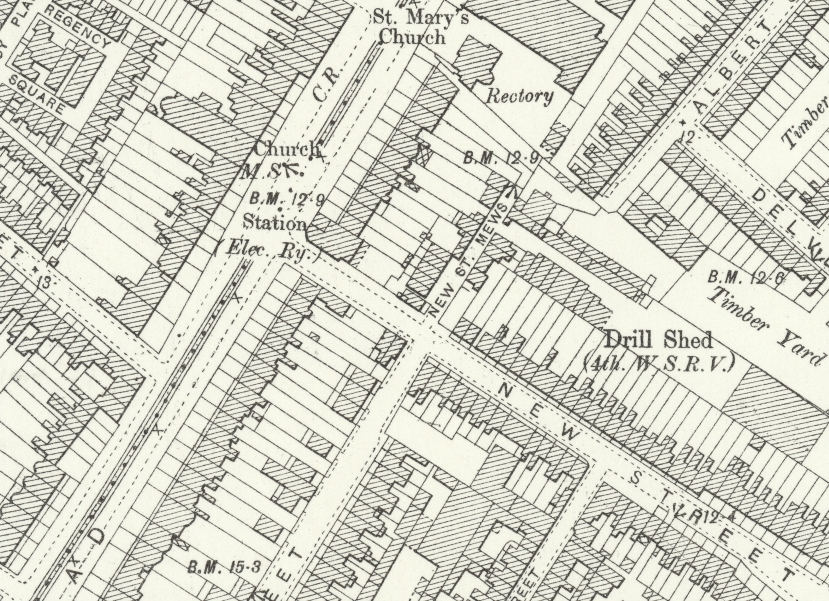
Kennington station on an 1890s Ordnance Survey map

From Elephant & Castle northwards, the CL&SS's running tunnels were bored to a diameter of 10 feet 2 inches (3.10 m); on the extension through Kennington they were bored to a larger diameter of 10 feet 6 inches (3.20 m). (Note: The diameter of the tunnels was recognised as a limitation on the capacity of the line and Greathead recommended a diameter of 12 feet (3.7 m) for future tube railways. Following a review in 1892 by a parliamentary joint committee, a minimum diameter of 11 feet 6 inches (3.51 m) was specified.) Station platform tunnels 200 feet (61 m) long and 20 by 16 feet (6.1 by 4.9 m) were formed in brick construction with an arched top and flat base. (Note: This was achieved by dismantling part of the lining to the running tunnels previously bored through the station and manually excavating the new tunnel profile before building a new lining of brick 3 feet (910 mm) thick. The station tunnels were constructed in brick because Greathead lacked experience in building tunnels this large and because he wanted to reduce the quantity of material to be excavated. The enlargement of the tunnels for the platforms caused subsidence above many of the stations damaging buildings, roadways and buried services. Near King William Street station, subsidence caused a gas main to crack and was blamed for damage to the Monument.) The platforms at Kennington and most of the other intermediate stations were constructed at different levels, with one side wall of the upper platform tunnel supported on the side wall of the lower platform tunnel. Travel between the surface and the platforms was by hydraulic lift or spiral stairs with the lower lift landing being at a level between the two platforms with steps or ramps up and down to the platforms.

The station building is a single-storey structure topped by a dome which originally housed the hydraulic equipment for the lifts. It was designed by T. P. Figgis and occupies the northern corner of the junction of Kennington Park Road and Braganza Street (previously New Street). Before opening, the C&SLR considered naming the station New Street. (Note: Between 1919 and 1927 the station was shown as "Kennington (New St)" or "Kennington (New Street)" on the Tube Map.) The station was opened on 18 December 1890 along with the rest of the line.

=== Reconstruction and connection to Hampstead Tube ===
The small diameter of the running tunnels meant that the train carriages were cramped compared to the deep-level tube railways that were constructed with larger diameter tunnels. In 1913, the C&SLR obtained permission to enlarge the tunnels to enable it to use new modern rolling stock, but World War I delayed the works. After the war, the C&SLR obtained renewed permission for the enlargement works. These were undertaken as part of a programme of works including an extension of the Hampstead Tube from Embankment to Kennington. (Note: The C&SLR and the Hampstead Tube were both subsidiaries of the Underground Electric Railways Company of London (UERL). The combined works planned by the UERL for the two railways also included the revival of a pre-war plan for an extension of the C&SLR from Euston to Camden Town where it connected to the Hampstead Tube (completed 1924), an extension of the Hampstead Tube from Golders Green to Edgware (completed 1924), and an extension of the C&SLR from Clapham Common to Morden (completed 1926).)

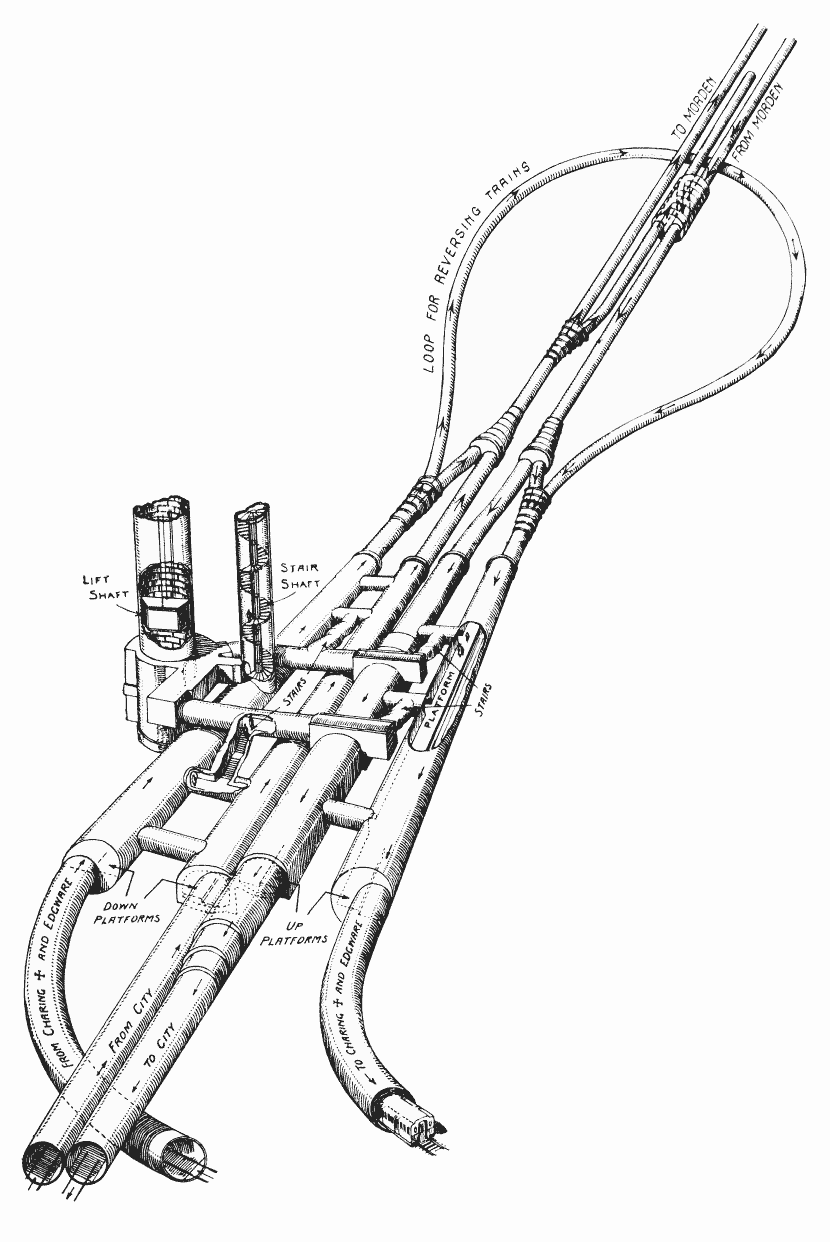
Layout of Kennington station following the reconstruction with additional platforms and reversing loop, before the extension to Battersea

The UERL planned to enlarge most of the C&SLR's tunnels whilst the railway remained in operation, with enlargement taking place at night and trains running during the day. Special tunnelling shields were constructed with openings that trains could run through. (Note: The section between Euston and Moorgate was closed on 8 August 1922.) To facilitate the enlargement works, Kennington station was closed on 1 June 1923 and used as a depot for the construction works. (Note: Borough and Stockwell stations were closed for the same purpose.) The platforms were removed and sidings installed for spoil wagons. A new shaft was sunk from the garden of an adjacent house to provide access to the tunnels and the passenger lifts were used to transfer the wagons between the tunnels and the surface.

To achieve a convenient arrangement for the interchange between the existing tunnels and the new ones to Embankment, several changes were made to the organisation of the station below ground. Two new platform tunnels were constructed parallel with and at the same level as the corresponding existing tunnels with the new tunnels on the outside of the existing ones. Linking passages were constructed between each pair of platforms to enable cross-platform interchanges. Both of the existing platforms had been accessed from the east, so, to make the link to the new northbound tunnel, the platform in the existing northbound tunnel was reconstructed on the other side, and the tracks were repositioned. (Note: A vestige of the change is a doorway in the trackside wall of the original northbound platform where the access passage formerly entered.)

The existing passage between the platforms and the lifts was severed by the new southbound platform so each pair of platforms was connected to new entrance and exit passages leading to and from the lifts. These passages were at a higher level than before, so the bottom landings of the lifts and the emergency stairs were raised by 11 feet (3.4 m) to match them. Along with the construction of the new tunnels, the existing station tunnels were increased in length to 350 feet (110 m) by enlarging the running tunnels. The enlargement was done with standard segmental iron linings, rather than the original brick.

At the lower levels of the station, the platform walls and passages were decorated with a new tiling scheme by Charles Holden, matching that used on new stations on the Morden extension and the new stations from Embankment. Other C&SLR stations were rebuilt during the 1920s modernisation (including the replacement of lifts with escalators at some), but the surface building at Kennington station was left largely unaltered. It is therefore the only station of the C&SLR's original section still in a condition close to its original design and the only one to be a listed building. (Note: Of the C&SLR's other five original stations nothing remains of the buildings at King William Street (demolished) or Borough, Elephant & Castle, Oval and Stockwell (all rebuilt).)

To enable trains from Waterloo to reverse, a loop tunnel was constructed connecting the new southbound and northbound platforms. A siding constructed between the two existing tunnels provided a reversing facility for trains coming from Elephant & Castle. Because the original southbound running tunnel was lower than the original northbound tunnel, a section of the siding was constructed at a 1:40 gradient to bring trains up to the level of the northbound tunnel before the reversing siding, which can accommodate two trains.

Following the completion of the extension and reconstruction works, the C&SLR and the Hampstead Tube operated as a single line, although they retained their own identities into the 1930s. A variety of names were used before "Northern line" was adopted in 1937. (Note: The combined route was shown on tube maps in black as it is today with the line names Hampstead and Highgate Line and City & South London Railway (for example, see 1926 tube map). The use of 'Northern line' as single name for the joint operation began on 28 August 1937.)

=== Post-war plans ===
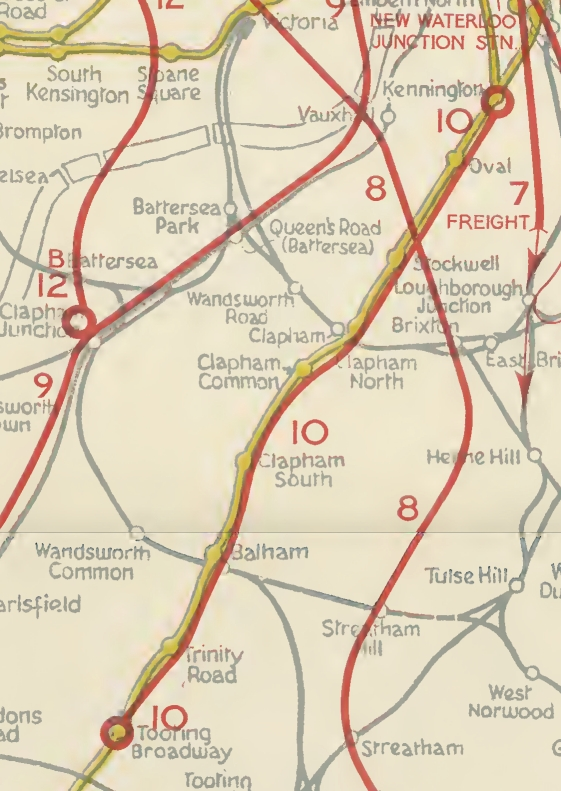
Duplication of tunnels from Kennington to Tooting Broadway proposed in 1946

After World War II, a review of rail transport in the London area produced a report in 1946 that proposed many new lines and identified the Morden branch as being the most overcrowded section of the London Underground, needing additional capacity. To relieve the congestion, the report recommended construction of a second pair of tunnels beneath the Northern line's tunnels between Kennington and Tooting Broadway to provide an express service. (Note: A duplication of parts of the Northern line's tunnels had first been considered in 1935 when new express tunnels were proposed between Camden Town and Waterloo and between Kennington and Balham. During the war, deep-level shelters were constructed beneath a number of Northern line stations so that they could be converted for use as part of the duplicate tunnels after the war.) Charing Cross branch trains would use the express tunnels and run to Morden. Trains using the existing tunnels would start and end at Tooting Broadway. Designated as routes 10, this proposal was not developed by the London Passenger Transport Board or its successor organisations. (Note: Of the twelve proposed routes, only Route 8, "A South to North Link – East Croydon to Finsbury Park" was developed, eventually becoming the Victoria line.)

=== Refurbishment ===
Refurbishment work at Kennington was completed in 2005. This included replacement of the 1920s tiles on platform and passage walls with matching tiles. Travel between surface and platform level continues to be via passenger lifts or stairs.

=== Extension to Battersea Power Station ===
In 2014, Transport for London (TfL) was granted parliamentary approval to construct an extension of the Charing Cross branch from Kennington to Battersea Power Station via Nine Elms. The new extension tunnels connect to the reversing loop tunnel in step plate junctions constructed from temporary construction shafts in Radcot Street and Harmsworth Street. (Note: The extension tunnels were bored between April and November 2017 using two tunnel boring machines starting at Battersea.) Two chambers were constructed on the line of the new tunnels at Kennington Green and Kennington Park for ventilation and emergency access.

TfL assessed that the Battersea extension would not significantly impact the number of passengers entering and exiting the station, but, to accommodate additional interchanges between the branches, additional cross-platform passageways were constructed between each pair of platforms. The 3 km (1.9 mi)-long extension opened on 20 September 2021.

== Services ==
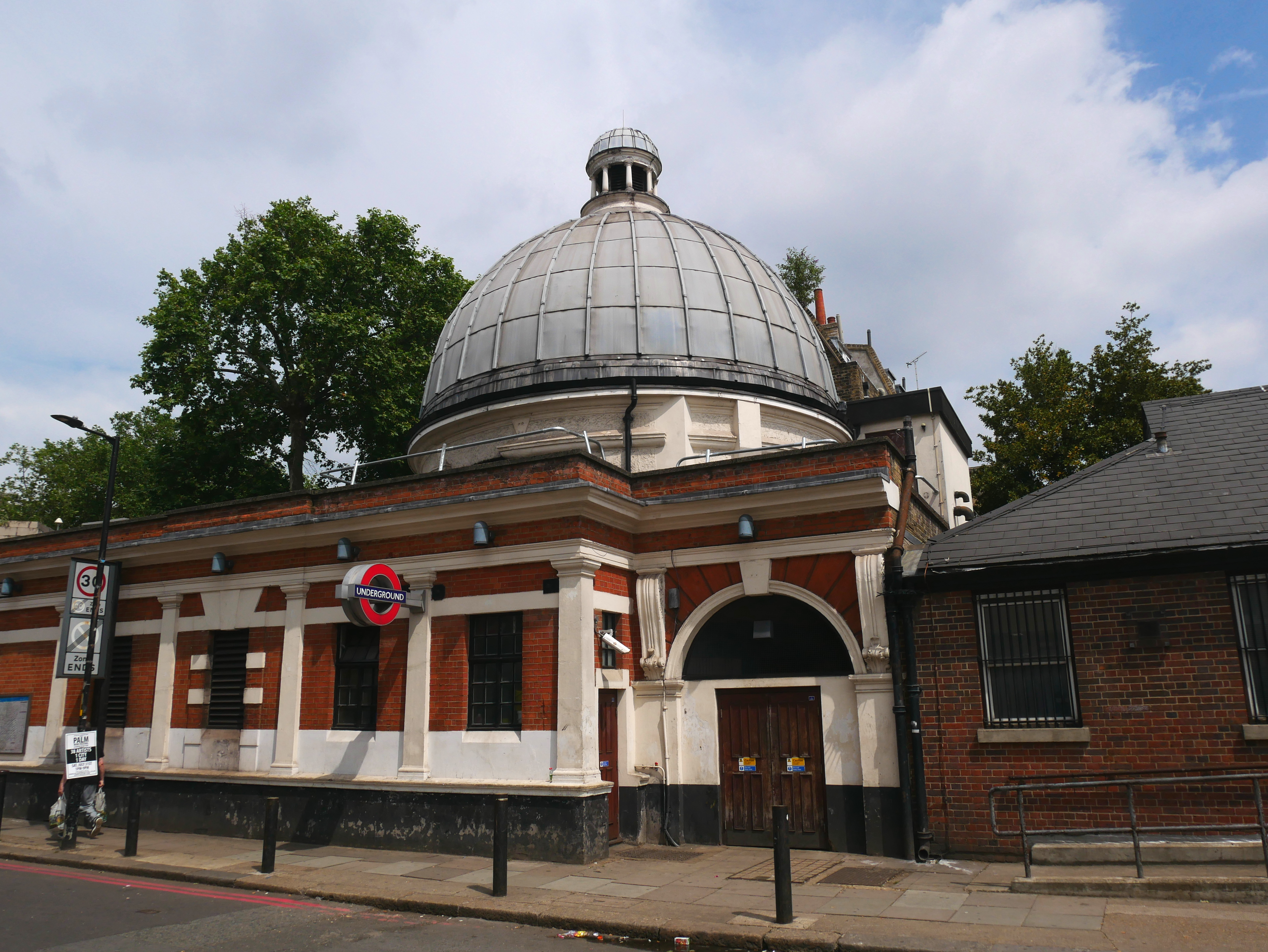
View of the station from the southeast

Kennington station is on the Northern line in London fare zones 1 and 2. It is between Waterloo (via Charing Cross) or Elephant & Castle (via Bank) to the north and Oval (towards Morden) or Nine Elms (towards Battersea Power Station) to the south. (Note: Before 16 May 2021, the station was in Zone 2 only. The stations on the Battersea Power Station extension are in Zone 1, so the station was reclassified as a joint zone 1 and 2 station so users of the extension would only pay a Zone 1 fare.) Train frequencies vary throughout the day but generally operate every 3–6 minutes between 05:37 and 00:33 northbound to Edgware, High Barnet or Mill Hill East via the Charing Cross or Bank branches and every 2–5 minutes between 06:01 and 00:46 southbound.

For most of the day, Charing Cross branch trains generally run to or from Battersea Power Station, or start or terminate at Kennington, using the Kennington loop, while Bank branch trains all run to or from Morden. During Peak hours, there are some limited Charing Cross branch trains that also run to or from Morden. During Night Tube operations, all Charing Cross branch trains run to and from Morden, while the Bank and Battersea branches don't run Night Tube services.

Preceding station	London Underground	Following station
Waterloo towards Edgware, Mill Hill East or High Barnet via Charing Cross	Northern line	Terminus
Waterloo towards Edgware, Mill Hill East or High Barnet via Charing Cross	Northern line	Nine Elms towards Battersea Power Station
Waterloo towards Edgware, Mill Hill East or High Barnet via Charing Cross	Northern line	Oval towards Morden
Elephant & Castle towards Edgware, Mill Hill East or High Barnet via Bank	Northern line	Oval towards Morden

== Connections ==
London Bus routes 133, 155, 333 and 415 with night routes N133 and N155 serve the station.

== Notes and references ==
=== Bibliography ===
- Day, John R; Reed, John (2010) [1963]. The Story of London's Underground (11th ed.). Capital Transport. ISBN 978-1-85414-341-9.
- Badsey-Ellis, Antony (2005). London's Lost Tube Schemes. Capital Transport. ISBN 1-85414-293-3.
- Badsey-Ellis, Antony (2016). Building London's Underground: From Cut-and Cover to Crossrail. Capital Transport. ISBN 978-1-8541-4397-6.
- Rose, Douglas (1999) [1980]. The London Underground, A Diagrammatic History (7th ed.). Douglas Rose/Capital Transport. ISBN 1-8541-4219-4.
- Emmerson, Andrew; Beard, Tony (2004). London's Secret Tubes. Capital Transport. ISBN 1-85414-283-6.
- Harris, Cyril M. (2006) [1977]. What's in a name?. Capital Transport. ISBN 1-8541-4241-0.
- Inglis, Charles (21 January 1946). Report to the Minister of War Transport. Ministry of War Transport/His Majesty's Stationery Office.
- Wolmar, Christian (2005) [2004]. The Subterranean Railway: How the London Underground Was Built and How It Changed the City Forever. Atlantic Books. ISBN 1-84354-023-1.
