= Edgware railway station =

Former railway station in London, England

Edgware
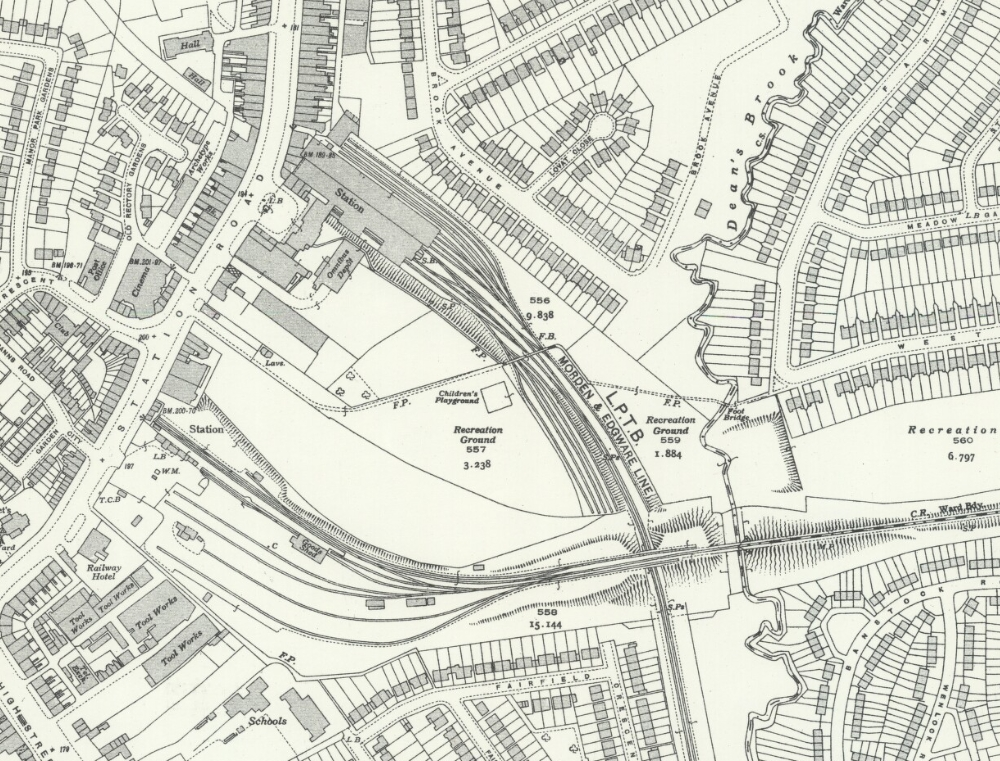
- Map of Edgware in 1937, showing the LNER station (bottom) and Underground station (top)
- Interactive map of Edgware

General information
- Location: Edgware, Greater London, (Note: It formed part of the historic county of Middlesex, when open.) England
- Owner: Great Northern Railway
- Number of platforms: 1

Key dates
- 22 August 1867: Opened
- 11 September 1939: Closed to passengers
- 1 June 1964: Closed to goods

Other information
- Coordinates: 51.61238°N 0.27700°W

Edgware railway station served the suburban town of Edgware, in north London, England. It was opened in 1867 and was in use as a passenger station by the London and North Eastern Railway (LNER) until 1939; it was then used as a goods yard until 1964. London Underground's Edgware tube station, which is served by the Northern line, is situated about 200 yards (180 m) to the north-east.

== History ==
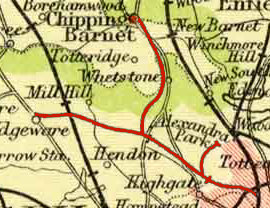
Map of Great Northern Railway's Edgware, High Barnet and Alexandra Palace branches (1900)

The station was built as the northern terminus of the single track Edgware, Highgate and London Railway (E&HLR) and was opened on 22 August 1867 by the Great Northern Railway (GNR), which had taken over the EH&LR, in what was then rural Middlesex.

The line ran from Finsbury Park to Edgware via Highgate. (Note: Branches from Finchley Central to High Barnet and Highgate to Alexandra Palace opened in 1872 and 1873 respectively.) At opening, the previous station on the line was Mill Hill East. In 1906, Mill Hill (The Hale) opened between them.

At first, services ran from Edgware to Finsbury Park, King's Cross and to Ludgate Hill, Blackfriars and Loughborough Road, via Snow Hill tunnel, on the south of the Thames. After 1869, trains terminated at Moorgate. Services could also run from Finsbury Park via the North London Railway to Broad Street after the Canonbury-Finsbury Park link opened in 1875; fourteen trains per day ran from Edgware to King's Cross.

In 1923, the line became part of the LNER after the Railways Act 1921 created the Big Four railway companies. In 1924, the London Underground's Hampstead Tube was extended north from Golders Green to its own station north of the LNER's. (Note: The Underground line's tracks passed under those of the LNER just east of the station.)

In 1935, the London Passenger Transport Board planned to take over the LNER's Edgware, High Barnet and Alexandra Palace branches as part of the Northern Heights part of the New Works Programme. The track would be electrified and modernised for use, with electric trains and amalgamated with the London Underground's Morden-Edgware line to form what is now the Northern line. (Note: The single track Edgware branch was to be provided with a second track from Finchley Central junction to the point of diversion into the Underground station.) The integration of the line meant the closure of Edgware railway station and the connection of its track to the Underground station, which was to be expanded to take the additional traffic. (Note: The Underground line was also to be extended from Edgware to Bushey Heath, in Hertfordshire, with three new stations at Brockley Hill, Elstree South and Bushey Heath.)

Works began in the late 1930s and were at an advanced stage when they were interrupted and halted by the Second World War. The section of line between Finchley Central and Edgware was closed to passenger services on 11 September 1939. (Note: On the Edgware branch of the line, only the works on the section from Finchley Central to Mill Hill East were completed. That section reopened with Underground services on 18 May 1941, as a one-station spur.)

After the war, a shortage of funds and the introduction of the Metropolitan Green Belt led to the cancellation of the unfinished Northern line elements of the New Works Programme in 1950. (Note: The extension of the line to Bushey Heath was no longer viable, as the new housing developments that it would have stimulated and served could no longer be constructed on land designated as Green Belt.) The goods yard at Edgware continued to operate with British Rail trains running from Finsbury Park until 1 June 1964, when it was completely closed. Afterwards, the track was removed, and the platforms and station buildings were demolished.

Preceding station	Disused railways	Following station
Terminus	London and North Eastern Railway; Edgware, Highgate and London Railway	Mill Hill (The Hale); Line and station closed

== The site today ==
The site of Edgware railway station is now occupied by a shopping centre, The Broadwalk Centre. Alongside part of the centre's car park runs a small stretch of the former trackbed, leading to the extant bridge over the Northern line tracks into the Underground station.
