= Watford and Edgware Railway =

Overview
- Locale: London
- Successor: Underground Electric Railways Company of London

The Watford and Edgware Railway (W&ER) was a company established in the 1860s in the United Kingdom to build a railway between Edgware in North London and Watford, Hertfordshire, via Bushey. Its planned 6.25-mile (10.06 km) route would have extended the railway line which forms part of the present-day Northern line on the London Underground network. Nothing substantial was constructed.

== History ==
Watford and Edgware Junction Railway Act 1864
- Act of Parliament
- Parliament of the United Kingdom
- Long title: An Act to authorize the Construction of a Railway from the Watford and Rickmansworth Railway at Watford to the Edgware, Highgate, and London Railway at Edgware.
- Citation: 27 & 28 Vict. c. ccv

Dates
- Royal assent: 14 July 1864

Text of statute as originally enacted

The W&ER had several proposed routes and stations but was generally intended to branch from the now closed Edgware, Highgate and London Railway (EH&LR) just before Edgware station and take a northerly route, with intermediate stations suggested at various times for Stanmore (London Road), Elstree (for Brockley Hill), Caldecott Hill (for Bushey Heath), Old Bushey, and Heathbourne Road. The line was planned to terminate at a station on the eastern side of Watford High Street, close to the site of Watford Central which was later planned by the Metropolitan Railway. One of the alternative proposals had it extend the Watford and Rickmansworth Railway from Rickmansworth in the direction of High Wycombe.

The company's continuing failure to raise the capital needed to construct its line may have been partly due to the competition that it would have offered to existing services. Opposition came from the London and North Western Railway to a junction at Watford and from the Midland Railway to a junction at Mill Hill Broadway. Eventually the Great Northern Railway (purchasers of the EH&LR before its opening) was authorised by the Great Northern Railway Act 1867 (30 & 31 Vict. c. cxxxi) to buy-out the W&ER and continued to develop proposals although nothing was built, and the railway was abandoned by the Great Northern Railway Act 1870 (33 & 34 Vict. c. lxxi).

Watford and Edgware Railway Act 1903
- Act of Parliament
- Parliament of the United Kingdom
- Long title: An Act to incorporate the Watford and Edgware Railway Company and for empowering them to construct a railway from Watford to Edgware and for other purposes.
- Citation: 3 Edw. 7. c. clxxxix

Dates
- Royal assent: 11 August 1903

Other legislation
- Amended by: Watford and Edgware Railway Act 1906

Text of statute as originally enacted

Watford and Edgware Railway Act 1906
- Act of Parliament
- Parliament of the United Kingdom
- Long title: An Act to extend the time limited by the Watford and Edgware Railway Act 1903 for the construction of works and the purchase of lands to authorise agreements between the Watford and Edgware Railway Company and other companies and for other purposes.
- Citation: 6 Edw. 7. c. cxcviii

Dates
- Royal assent: 4 August 1906

Other legislation
- Amends: Watford and Edgware Railway Act 1903

In 1922, the Underground Electric Railways Company of London (forerunner of most of the London Underground) purchased the W&ER with the intention of using its land and right of way to continue the extension of the Charing Cross, Euston & Hampstead Railway (CCE&HR, now part of the Northern line) that it was then building north from Golders Green to Edgware. Various plans were made but no construction took place.

Work on the route finally started in 1935 as part of Northern Heights plan, through which London Underground was to take over the EH&LR lines, then part of the London and North Eastern Railway, and join them to the Northern line.

This extension adopted much of the W&ER's concept, including the location of the junction between Edgware and Mill Hill, the location of the station at Edgware, and the route from Edgware to Old Bushey. The planned extension was to terminate at Bushey Heath due to funding limitations, but provision was made in the design of the station for a further extension to Old Bushey. Earthworks were underway and the tunnel near Elstree South station and the viaduct for Brockley Hill station had been partly constructed when the start of World War II caused works to cease.

Work did not restart immediately after the war as there were stronger demands on funds for works elsewhere including the reconstruction of many damaged stations and the extensions of the Central line. After the introduction of Metropolitan Green Belt the Elstree and Bushey areas were protected against development, so the need for new stations to serve new residential developments in the area disappeared and the project was cancelled in 1950.
