= Brockley Hill tube station =

Cancelled London Underground station

Brockley Hill
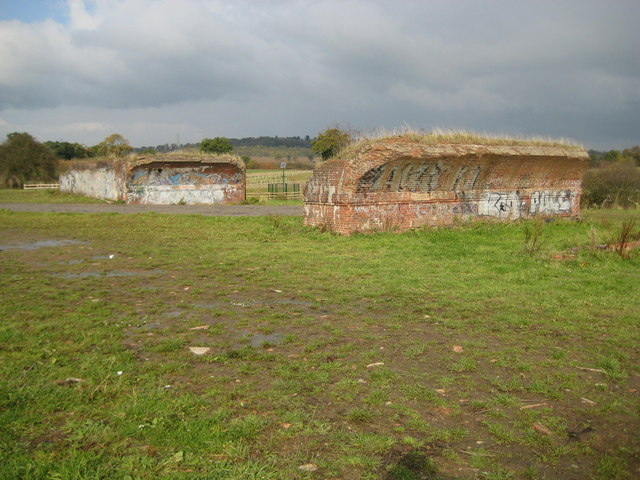
- Remains of viaduct built for Brockley Hill station
- Interactive map of Brockley Hill

General information
- Location: Brockley Hill
- Local authority: Barnet
- Grid reference: TQ187931
- Owner: Never Opened
- Number of platforms: 2

Railway companies
- Original company: London Underground

Other information
- Coordinates: 51.624°N 0.287°W

Brockley Hill was a proposed London Underground station that was going to be built at Brockley Hill in north London as part of the 1935-1940 New Works Programme for the London Passenger Transport Board. This station would have been the first of three to be built as part of a 1930s extension project (known as the "Northern Heights") to extend the Northern Line to Bushey Heath. The next stops being Elstree South and Bushey Heath, both would have been near the Aldenham Works, London Transport's main bus overhaul depot.

Brockley Hill station was never completed because project funding was withdrawn in December 1939 due to the outbreak of the Second World War. Post-war the project did not restart because the Town and Country Planning Act 1947 had created the Metropolitan Green Belt around London curtailing further urban expansion. Without the planned housing estates to serve the line, the Northern Heights extension project was permanently cancelled. Most of the pre-war brick foundations for Brockley Hill station and its approach viaduct were demolished in the subsequent decade. The station's location is in what is now Edgware Way Grassland close to Edgwarebury Park on the north side of the junction of Edgware Way / Watford Bypass (A41), and Spur Road (A410).

== History ==
=== Planning and construction ===
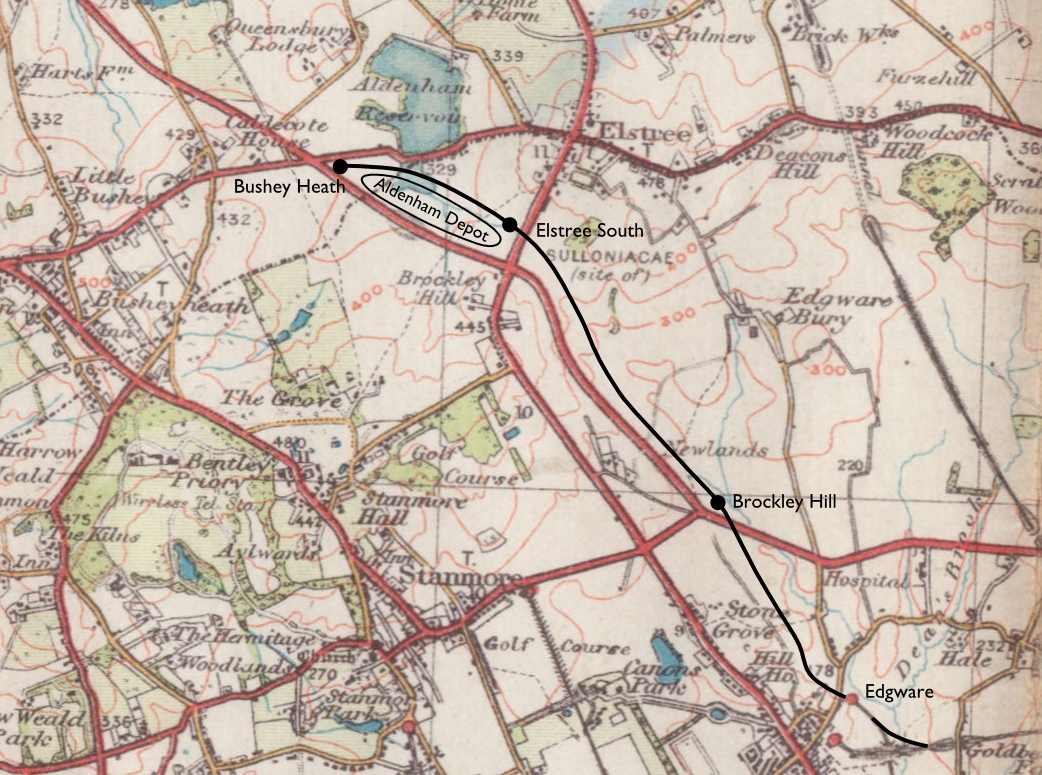
Planned route of the Bushey Heath extension superimposed on a 1934 map showing the rural nature of the area

The station was the first of three planned by London Passenger Transport Board (LPTB) in 1935 to extend the Northern line from Edgware to Bushey Heath. There was debate about the name for the station, with Edgwarebury, Edgebury, Canons, North Edgware and All Souls all being proposed. (Note: A protracted, series of discussions within the LPTB and with other interested parties took place during 1937 and 1938. The original name proposed and used during much of planning stages was "Edgwarebury", linked to the nearby village. This was disliked by LPTB chairman Lord Ashfield because it was three syllables. He proposed a shortening to "Edgebury" though All Souls College, owner of some of the land to be used, disliked this and preferred the name of the village or that of the local landmark Brockley Hill. LPTB managing director Frank Pick suggested "All Souls", but that was considered to be a depressing name by the Commercial Manager, Alec Valentine. "Canons" was considered by the LPTB due to the proximity of Canons Park. If adopted, the Metropolitan line (now Jubilee line) station of that name was to be renamed "Whitchurch".)

The extension was part of the Northern Heights project which was intended to electrify a number of steam-operated London and North Eastern Railway (LNER) branch lines and to incorporate them into the Northern line. Much of the land for the extension came from the purchase in 1922 by the LPTB's precursor, the Underground Electric Railways Company of London, of the unbuilt Watford and Edgware Railway (W&ER). The W&ER had planned an extension of the Edgware, Highgate and London Railway to Watford Junction via Bushey, but it had never raised the capital required and its powers to construct a line had expired in 1911. The specific route to Bushey Heath was approved by parliament in October 1937. The LPTB's principal purpose for the extension to Elstree was to stimulate the development of new residential areas to increase passenger numbers. A secondary purpose was to provide a location suitable for a large new depot that was required to accommodate and maintain the new fleet of 1938 Stock trains to be used across the existing Northern line and the lines taken over from the LNER. (Note: The Northern line's depot at Golders Green and the Northern City line's depot at Drayton Park were poorly arranged and unsuitable for the accommodation and maintenance of the new trains. The LPTB considered constructing a new depot alongside the LNER's line between Finchley Central and Edgware, but could not negotiate a deal with the local authority for a suitable site in time to enable the depot to be built before the new rolling stock was to be delivered.) (Note: The arrangement of the depot at Aldenham located between Elstree South and Bushey Heath was intended to be similar to that between Oakwood and Cockfosters on the recently opened Piccadilly line extension.)

Brockley Hill station was to be located on a viaduct to the north of the existing junction of Edgware Way and Spur Road. The T-junction was to be reconstructed as a roundabout to incorporate a forecourt for access to a curving range of shops and a continuation of Spur Road heading to the north-east to a new housing development. The station was designed by the LPTB's architectural department in conjunction with the estates department of All Souls College. (Note: At the same time, All Souls College was planning the development of a shopping centre along the existing section of Spur Road.) The station platforms were to be on the viaduct and on a bridge over Spur Road and were to be long enough for nine-car trains being planned for the new Northern line service. The ticket hall was to be located under the bridge with stairs up to the platforms and provision for escalators to be installed later. The station was to be provided with a car park for 20–25 cars.

Construction on the Northern Heights project began in the late 1930s but was interrupted by the Second World War. Most of the work to that date had been carried out on LNER branch tracks, but work between Edgware and Bushey Heath had started in June 1939. The route of the line had been cleared and laid out and some earthworks and tunnelling carried out between Edgware and Elstree South. At the site of Brockley Hill station and south of Edgware Way, construction of the piers of the viaduct had begun and three out of 12 arches at Brockley Hill station had been completed by August 1939. Following the outbreak of war in Europe, work on the station and the extension was suspended in September 1939 and was formally terminated in December of the same year as wartime funding restrictions would prevent completion. During the war years, the LPTB-owned land was used for farming vegetables for staff canteens.

=== Cancellation ===
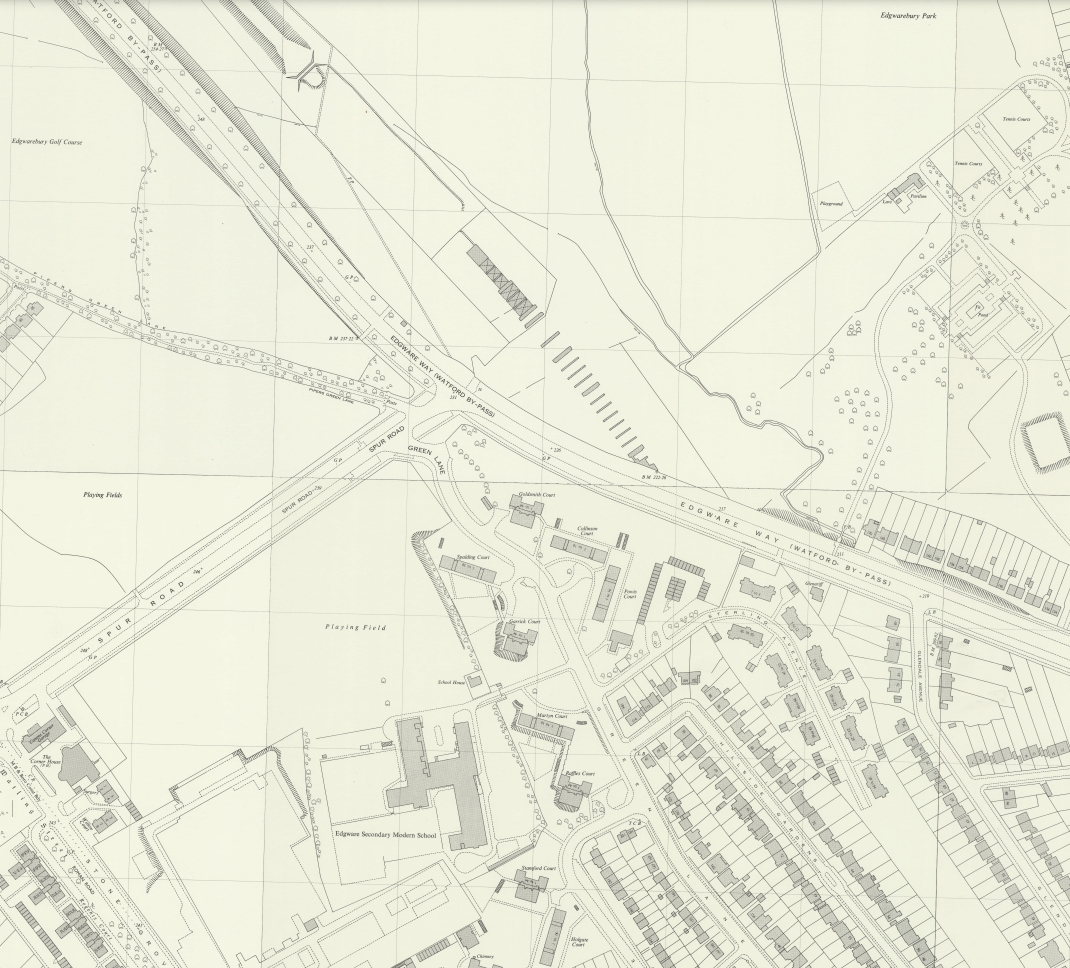
The remains of the incomplete viaduct at Brockley Hill, 1963 Ordnance Survey Map

The sites of the new stations were semi-rural and, as elsewhere, it was intended that the new section would stimulate the construction of housing estates that the stations would serve. After the war, new legislation limited expansion of urban areas into the countryside. This created the Metropolitan Green Belt around London and the area covered the Northern line extension. Without housing estates, the line had no purpose and the plans for the route north of Brockley Hill were cancelled in October 1950.

Some consideration was given to completing the extension as far as Brockley Hill, as it had some housing and the site lay just within the green belt. The line beyond to Bushey Heath would have been completed for access to the depot. Analysis showed the capacity needed without the Bushey Heath extension could be accommodated by developing LNER's former Highgate depot, and the final part of the route was abandoned on 26 November 1953. (Note: The public announcement of the cancellation was not made until February 1954.)

The viaduct piers south of Edgware Way were demolished in 1959 to make way for new housing. The completed arches of the station viaduct were partially demolished in the 1960s leaving stumps of brickwork in a field and part of the north abutment of the bridge adjacent to Edgware Way. Earthworks north of the station site parallel with the bypass indicate the route towards Elstree South.

=== Route between Edgware and Brockley Hill ===
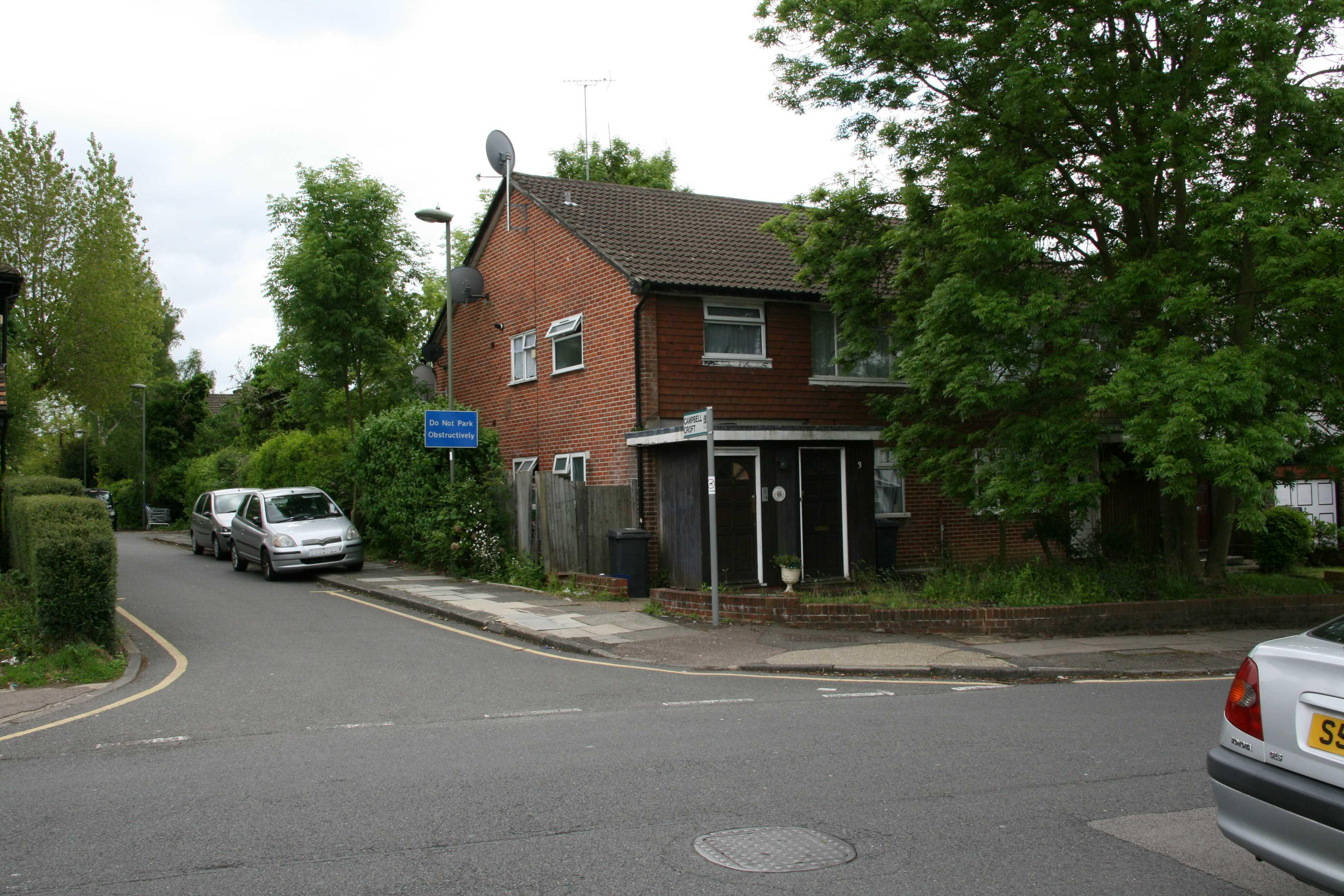
Campbell Croft

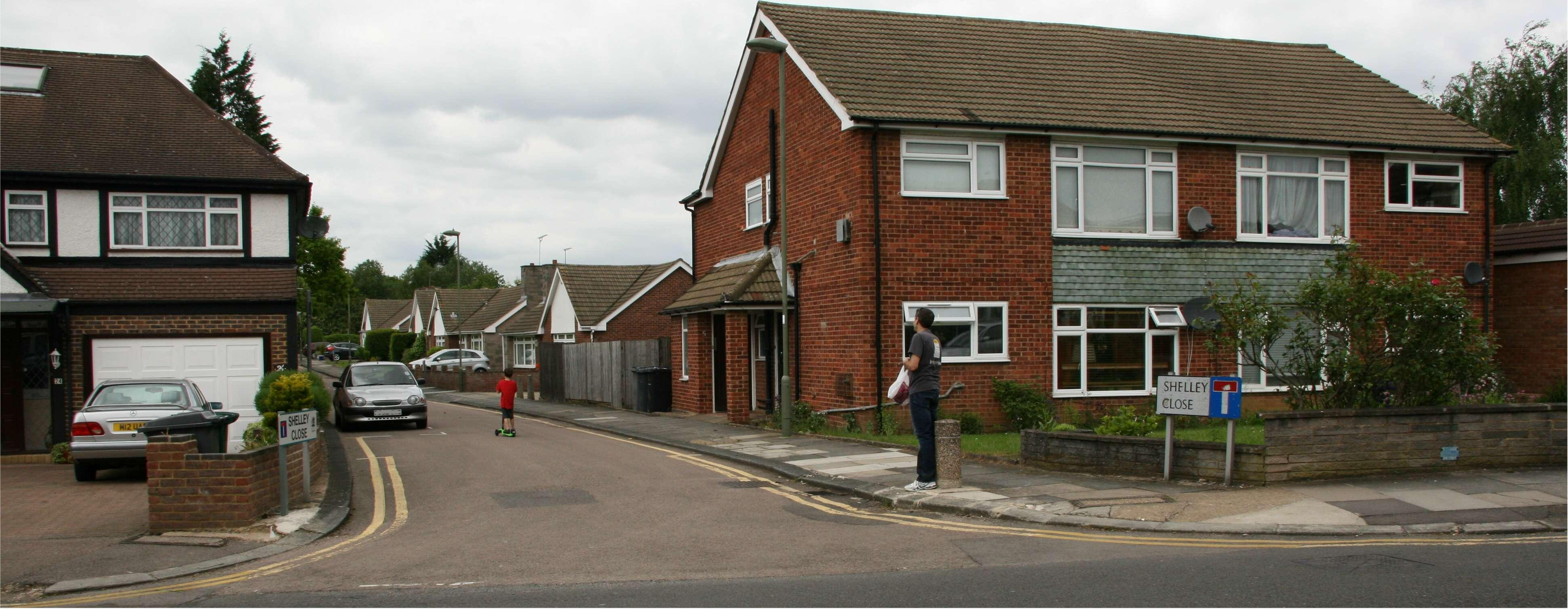
Shelley Close

Residential development along the abandoned route between Edgware and Brockley Hill stations

The route for the railway north from Edgware station had been reserved through the W&ER's right of way before Edgware station was built. As Edgware developed as a suburb of London following the opening of the Underground station in 1924, the route was left clear of housing.

The line was to pass under Station Road and Rectory Lane. It would have then run in a cutting north-west, before cutting Purcells Avenue in two, where a footbridge was to be provided to connect the severed ends. North of Purcells Avenue the tracks continued north-west, rising on to a viaduct to cross over Edgware Way on a bridge to meet the viaduct at the southern end of Brockley Hill station. Following the abandonment of the extension, the unused land between Edgware and Brockley Hill was developed for housing with the western end of Heronsgate, Campbell Croft, Shelley Close and the southern section of Sterling Avenue filling the space.

== Notes and references ==
How Brockley Hill station would appear on the London Underground Map if the Northern line extension to Bushey Heath and Mill Hill East had been completed

=== Bibliography ===
- Beard, Tony (2002). By Tube Beyond Edgware. Capital Transport. ISBN 978-1-85414-246-7.
- Horne, Mike (2009) [1990]. The Northern Line, An Illustrated History (3rd ed.). Capital Transport. ISBN 978-1-85414-326-6.
- Rose, Douglas (2016) [1980]. The London Underground, A Diagrammatic History (9th ed.). Douglas Rose/Capital Transport. ISBN 978-1-85414-404-1.

Abandoned Northern Heights Extension
Preceding station	London Underground	Following station
Elstree South towards Bushey Heath	Northern line	Edgware towards Morden or Kennington
