= Mill Hill (The Hale) railway station =

Former railway station in England

Mill Hill (The Hale)
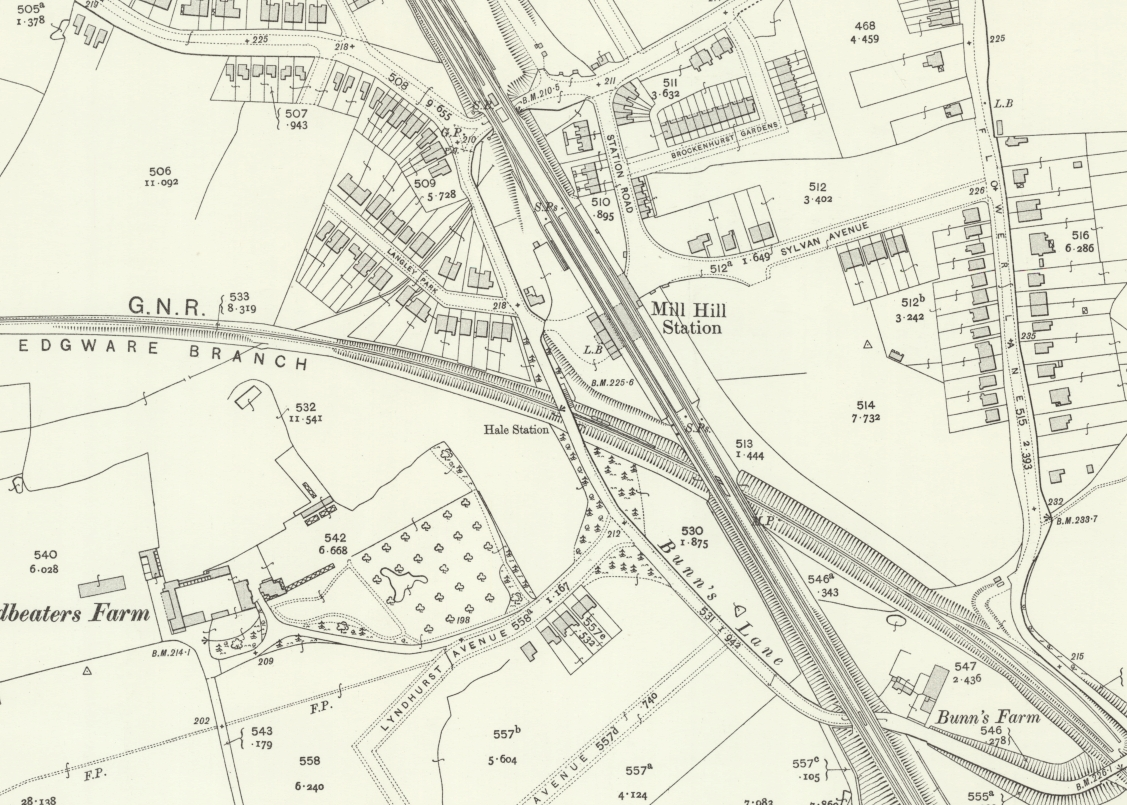
- The Hale station and Mill Hill station, 1913

- Location of Mill Hill (The Hale) in Greater London
- Location: Mill Hill
- Local authority: Barnet
- Owner: Great Northern Railway
- Number of platforms: 1

Key dates
- 1906: Opened (Passengers)
- 1910: Opened (Goods)
- 1939: Closed (Passengers)
- 1964: Closed (Goods)

Other information
- Coordinates: 51.6119°N 0.2492°W

Mill Hill (The Hale) was a station in Mill Hill in north London. It was on the now-removed railway between Mill Hill East station and Edgware railway station, near the junction of Bunns Lane and Lyndhurst Avenue.

== History ==
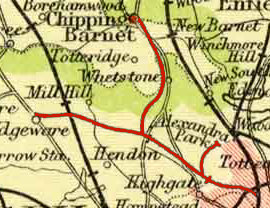
Edgware Highgate & London Railway, 1900

The railway line was built by the Edgware, Highgate and London Railway (EH&LR) and was opened on 22 August 1867, in what was then rural Middlesex, by the Great Northern Railway (GNR) (which had taken over the EH&LR). The station, then named The Hale Halt, was not opened until 11 June 1906, on the single track from Finchley Central to Edgware. The whole line ran from Finsbury Park to Edgware via Highgate with branches to Alexandra Palace and High Barnet. The station was adjacent to the Midland Railway's (MR's) Mill Hill station (now Mill Hill Broadway), with the GNR's track passing under those of the MR just to the south of Mill Hill station. A goods service opened on 18 July 1910.

After the Railways Act 1921 created the 'Big Four' railway companies, the line was, from 1923, part of the London and North Eastern Railway (LNER). The station was named Mill Hill (The Hale) in 1928.

In 1935, London Underground devised a five-year New Works Programme of improvements, and planned to take over the line from the LNER in its "Northern Heights plan". The line was to be modernised for use by electric trains on double track, and amalgamated with the Northern line. The two adjacent stations were to be provided with a new combined entrance building with a shared forecourt and shops.

Works began in the late 1930s and were at an advanced stage, with a second track laid between Finchley Central junction and Mill Hill (The Hale) when they were interrupted by the Second World War. The section of line between Finchley Central station and Edgware was closed to passenger services on 11 September 1939. (Note: The works on the section from Finchley Central to Mill Hill East were completed and opened for Underground trains on 18 May 1941, to allow access to and from the nearby army barracks.)

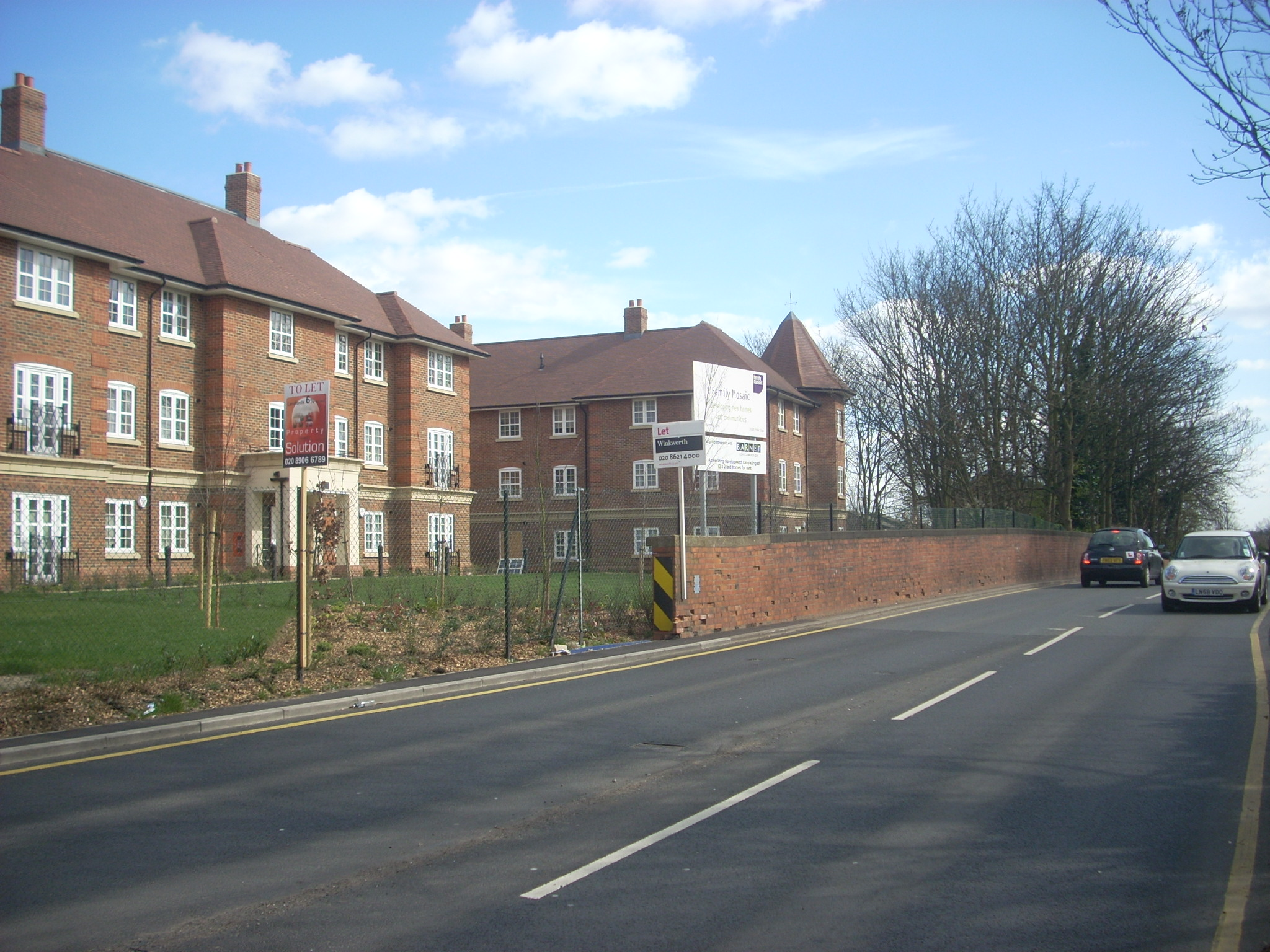
Left: flats built over the station site. Right: the bridge.

After the war, shortage of funds, then the Town & Country Planning Act (which led to the Bushey Heath area being made part of the Metropolitan Green Belt) led to the cancellation of the Northern Heights work in the early 1950s. Mill Hill (The Hale) was the only station between Edgware and Mill Hill East, and as Edgware was already served by the Underground from its own station in the town, and Mill Hill was served by the adjacent station, there was little need for the completion of the track modernisation works and the re-opening of the line for passenger services. The second track laid before the war was dismantled and removed without having been used. The goods services continued at Mill Hill (The Hale) until 29 February 1964, when it was completely closed. (Note: Goods services continued to Edgware until 1 June 1964 when the line closed for good.)

Until 1969, it was possible to buy an Underground ticket to "Mill Hill The Hale" even though no such station had existed for years. This enabled passengers to keep their tickets upon alighting at Mill Hill East and to travel onwards by 240A bus anywhere between Mill Hill and Edgware.

Today, the track has been removed and the platforms and station buildings have been demolished. The site of Mill Hill (The Hale) station was covered by material excavated for the construction of slip roads to the nearby section of the M1 motorway.

== Notes and references ==
How Mill Hill tube station would appear on the London Underground Map today if the Northern line extension from Edgware to Bushey Heath and Mill Hill East had been completed

=== Bibliography ===
- Brown, Joe (2015) [2006]. London Railway Atlas (4th ed.). Ian Allan. ISBN 978-0-7110-3819-6.
- Hardy, Brian, ed. (March 2011). "How it used to be - freight on The Underground 50 years ago". Underground News (591). London Underground Railway Society. ISSN 0306-8617.
- Horne, Mike (2009) [1990]. The Northern Line, An Illustrated History (3rd ed.). Capital Transport. ISBN 978-1-85414-326-6.

Disused railways
Edgware; Line and station closed	British Railways (Eastern Region); Edgware, Highgate and London Railway	Mill Hill East; Line closed, station open
Abandoned Northern Heights extension
Preceding station	London Underground	Following station
Edgware towards Bushey Heath	Northern line	Mill Hill East towards Morden or Kennington
