= Northern line =

London Underground line

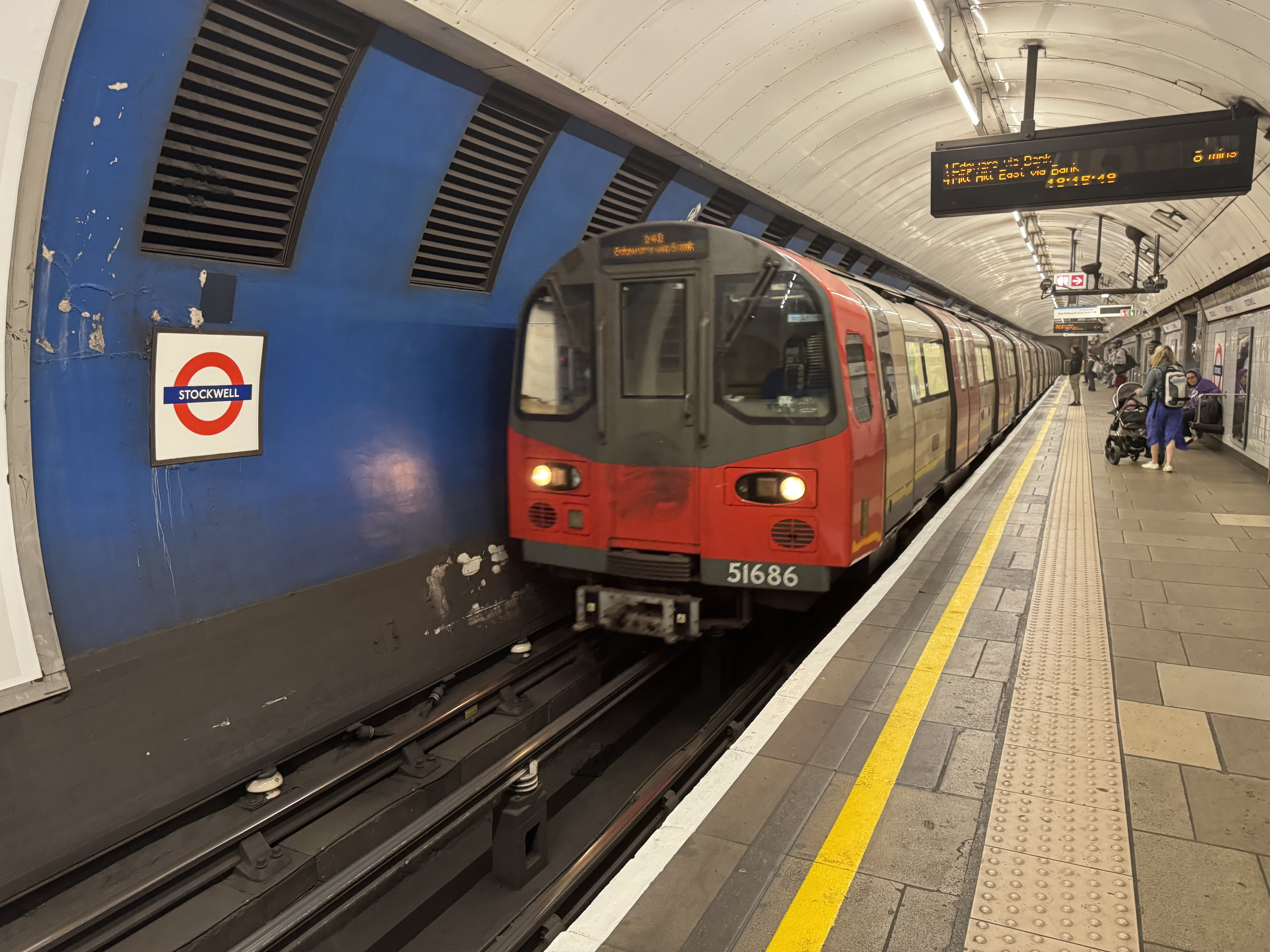
- 1995 Stock arrives at Stockwell tube station heading northbound to Edgware via Bank

Overview
- Termini: Kennington, Battersea Power Station, Morden; Edgware, High Barnet, Mill Hill East
- Stations: 52
- Colour on map: Black
- Website: tfl.gov.uk/tube/route/northern/

Service
- Type: Rapid transit
- System: London Underground
- Depots: Golders Green; Morden; Stabling Sidings: Highgate; Edgware; High Barnet
- Rolling stock: 1995 Stock
- Ridership: 339.7 million passenger journeys (2019)

History
- Opened: 18 December 1890; 135 years ago (Note: as City and South London Railway. Charing Cross, Euston & Hampstead Railway opened its section in 22 June 1907; 119 years ago. Lines merged in 13 September 1926; 100 years ago. Renamed to Northern line in 28 August 1937; 89 years ago)
- Last extension: 20 September 2021; 5 years ago

Technical
- Line length: 58 km (36 mi)
- Character: Deep-level tube
- Track gauge: 1,435 mm (4 ft 8 1/2 in) standard gauge
- Electrification: Fourth rail, 630 V DC
- Operating speed: 45 mph (72 km/h)
- Signalling: CBTC (SelTrac)
Transport for London rail lines
London Underground
Bakerloo
Central
Circle
District
Hammersmith & City
Jubilee
Metropolitan
Northern
Piccadilly
Victoria
Waterloo & City
London Overground
Liberty
Lioness
Mildmay
Suffragette
Weaver
Windrush
Other TfL Modes
DLR
Elizabeth line
London Trams

The Northern line is a London Underground line which runs between North London and South London. It is printed in black on the Tube map. It carries more passengers per year than any other Underground line – around 340 million in 2019 – making it the busiest tube line in London. The Northern line is unique on the network in having two routes through Central London, two northern branches and two southern branches. Despite its name, it does not serve the northernmost stations on the Underground, though it does serve the southernmost station at Morden, the terminus of one of the two southern branches.

The line's northern termini, all in the London Borough of Barnet, are at Edgware and High Barnet; Mill Hill East is the terminus of a single-station branch line off the High Barnet branch. The two main northern branches run south to join at Camden Town where two routes, one via Charing Cross in the West End and the other via Bank in the City, continue and then join at Kennington in Southwark. At Kennington the line again divides into two branches, one to each of the southern termini – at Morden, in the borough of Merton, and at Battersea Power Station in Wandsworth.

For most of its length the Northern line is a deep tube line. (Note: A "tube" railway is an underground railway constructed in a cylindrical tunnel by the use of a tunnelling shield, usually deep below ground level.) The portion between Stockwell and Borough opened in 1890 and is the oldest section of deep-level tube line on the network. Nearly 340 million passenger journeys were recorded in 2019 on the Northern line, making it the busiest on the Underground, although this is distorted due to having two branches within Central London, both of which are less busy than the core sections of other lines. Despite the line's name, it has 18 of the system's 31 stations south of the River Thames. There are 52 stations in total on the line, of which 38 have platforms below ground.

The line's structure of two northern branches (one with a further short branch), two central branches, and two southern branches reflects its complicated history. The core of the line, including the two central branches and the beginnings of the two northern branches, was constructed by two companies, the City and South London Railway and the Charing Cross, Euston and Hampstead Railway, in the 1890s and 1900s. The companies came under the same ownership in 1913, and were physically connected and operationally merged in the 1920s, while at the same time extensions to Edgware and Morden were completed.

In the 1930s and 1940s the Northern line took over and electrified the London and North Eastern Railway branches from Highgate to Mill Hill East and High Barnet, which were built as part of the Edgware, Highgate and London Railway. This was the final extension of the line for eight decades, though between the 1930s and 1970s the Northern City Line was branded and operated as part of the Northern line despite being disconnected from the rest of the line. The most recent extension, a second southern branch from Kennington to Battersea, opened on 20 September 2021. There are proposals to split the line into two lines.

== History ==
=== Formation ===
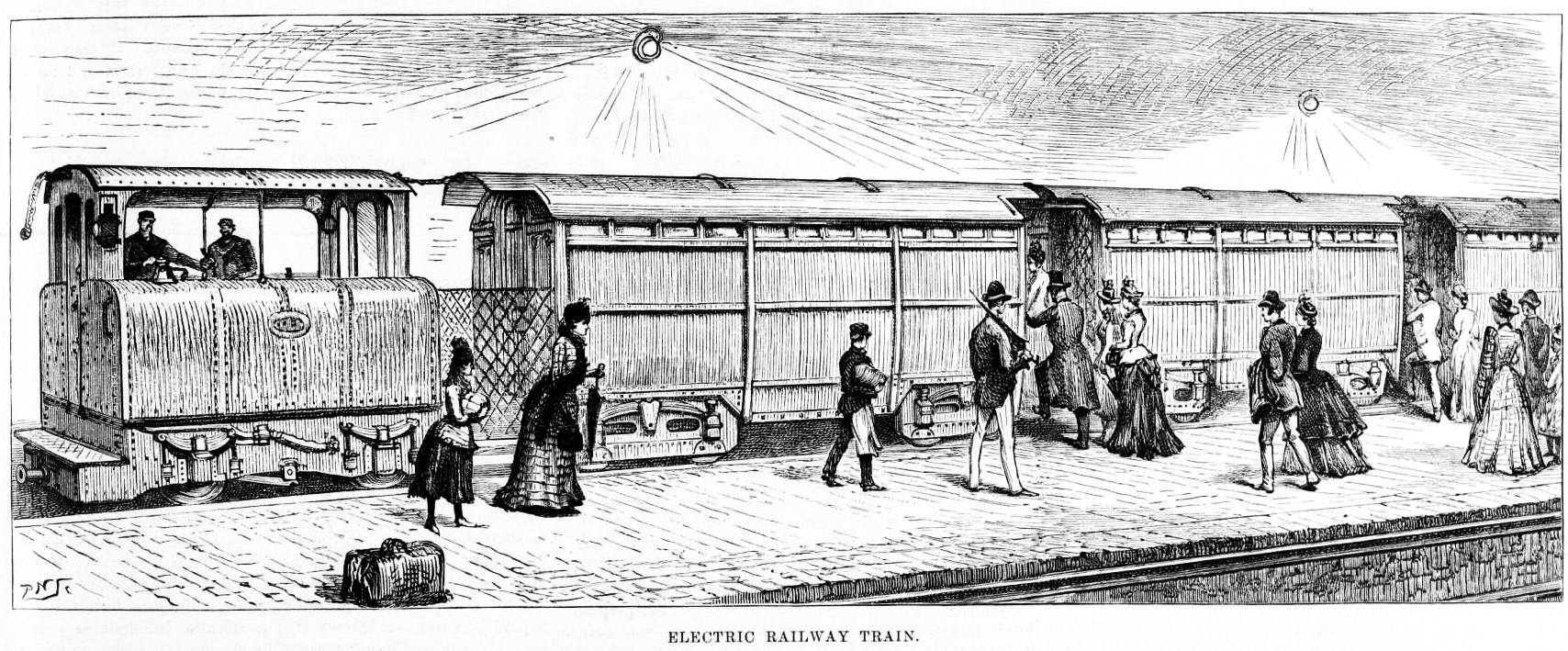
City & South London Railway train, 1890

The core of the Northern line evolved from two railway companies: the City & South London Railway (C&SLR) and the Charing Cross, Euston & Hampstead Railway (CCE&HR).

The C&SLR was London's first electric hauled deep-level tube railway. It was built under the supervision of James Henry Greathead, who had been responsible for the Tower Subway. It was the first of the Underground's lines to be constructed by boring deep below the surface and the first to be operated by electric traction. The railway opened in November 1890 from Stockwell to a now-disused station at King William Street. This was inconveniently placed and unable to cope with the company's traffic so in 1900 a new route to Moorgate via Bank was opened. By 1907, the C&SLR had been further extended at both ends to run from Clapham Common to Euston.

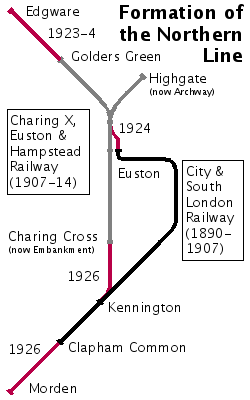
Formation of the Northern line up to the 1920s

The CCE&HR, commonly known as the "Hampstead Tube", was opened in 1907 and ran from Strand (nowadays Charing Cross) via Euston to Camden Town with branches splitting to Golders Green and Highgate (nowadays Archway). It was extended south by one stop to Charing Cross (nowadays Embankment) in 1914 to form an interchange with the Bakerloo and District lines. In 1913, the Underground Electric Railways Company of London (UERL), owner of the CCE&HR, took over the C&SLR although they remained separate companies for some time.

=== Integration ===
During the early 1920s a series of works were carried out to connect the C&SLR and CCE&HR tunnels to enable an integrated service to be operated. The first of these new tunnels between the C&SLR's Euston and CCE&HR's Camden Town stations had originally been planned in 1912 but was delayed by the First World War. Construction began in 1922 and this first tunnel opened in 1924. The second connection linking the CCE&HR's Embankment and C&SLR's Kennington stations opened in 1926. It provided a new intermediate station at Waterloo to connect to the main line station. The smaller diameter tunnels of the C&SLR were also enlarged to match the standard diameter of the CCE&HR and other deep tube lines. In conjunction with the works to integrate the two lines, two major extensions were undertaken: northwards to Edgware in Middlesex and southwards to Morden in Surrey.

The Edgware extension used plans dating back to 1901 for the Edgware and Hampstead Railway which the UERL's subsidiary, the London Electric Railway, had taken over in 1912. It extended the CCE&HR line from its terminus at Golders Green to Hendon Central in 1923 and to Edgware in 1924. The line crossed open countryside and ran mostly on viaduct from Golders Green to Brent and then on the surface, apart from a short tunnel north of Hendon Central. Five new stations were built to pavilion-style designs by Stanley Heaps, stimulating the rapid northward expansion of suburban developments in the following years.

The engineering of the Morden extension of the C&SLR from Clapham Common to Morden was more demanding, running in tunnel to Morden station which was then constructed in a cutting and the line continued a bit beyond to the depot. The extension was initially planned to continue to Sutton over part of the route of the unbuilt Wimbledon and Sutton Railway (in which the UERL held a stake) but agreements were made with Southern Railway (SR) to end the extension at Morden, the SR building a surface line from Wimbledon to Sutton in the 1930s via South Merton and St. Helier. (Note: The stations that the C&SLR were to serve on the W&SR, would not have included all those subsequently built by the Southern Railway. South Morden (not built), Sutton Common, Cheam (not built) and Sutton, would have been served, but Morden South, St Helier and West Sutton were not part of the UERL's plan.) The tube extension itself opened in 1926 with seven new stations all designed by Charles Holden in a modern style.

Owing to the complicated nature of the resulting line, it became known as the Morden–Edgware line, although a number of alternative portmanteau names were mooted in the fashion of the Baker Street and Waterloo Railway becoming the Bakerloo line, such as "Edgmor", "Mordenware", "Medgeway" and "Edgmorden" lines.

After the UERL and the Metropolitan Railway (MR) became unified under the London Passenger Transport Board (LPTB) in 1933, the MR's Great Northern & City Railway subsidiary, which ran mostly underground from Moorgate to Finsbury Park, transferred management to the Morden–Edgware line, branding itself as the Northern City line.

=== Northern Heights plan ===
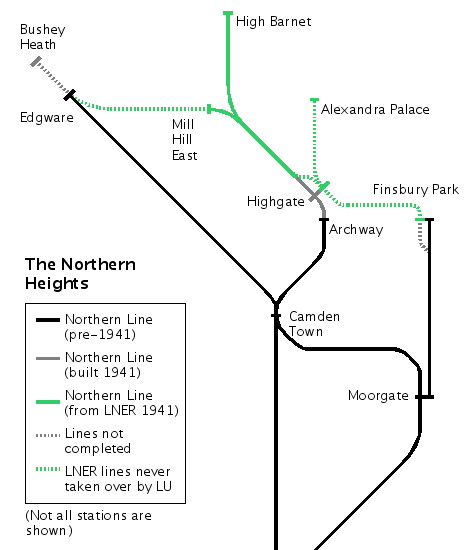
Line map of the abandoned Northern Heights plan

Geographic map of Northern line segments proposed under the Northern Heights plan Opened segments of the Northern line LNER segments never converted to the Northern line Unbuilt extension to Bushey Heath

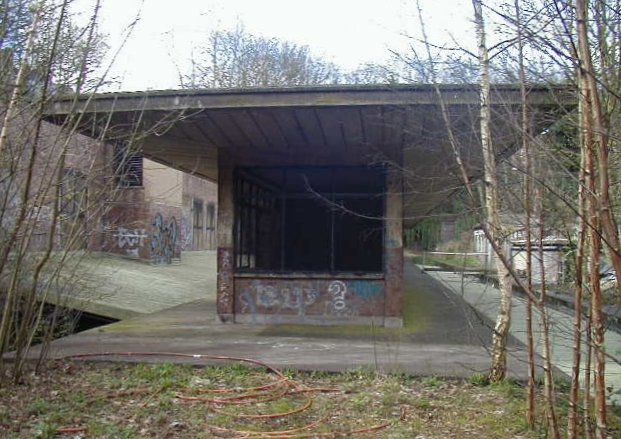
The abandoned high-level platforms at Highgate station, intended for Northern City line trains

Following the formation of the LPTB, in June 1935 the organisation proposed the New Works Programme, an ambitious plan to expand the Underground network in response to London's growing suburban population and to relieve congestion on the existing steam-operated suburban lines. In the case of the Morden–Edgware, these were the London and North Eastern Railway (LNER) suburban lines north of Highgate, built in 1867–73 by the Edgware, Highgate and London Railway (EH&LR) and its successors, running from Finsbury Park to Edgware via Highgate, with branches to Alexandra Palace and High Barnet.

The Morden–Edgware line's project, known as the Northern Heights plan owing to the high ground in north London, involved fourth-rail electrification of the surface lines and the double-tracking of the single-line section between Finchley (Church End) and Edgware. The Northern Heights plan also called for the construction of three new linking sections of track: between the Northern City line and new surface level platforms at Finsbury Park; a deep-level tunnel from Archway to East Finchley; and a diversion of the Mill Hill branch to the LPTB's Edgware station.

In addition, the Edgware branch would also be extended beyond the terminus to a site at Bushey Heath, the LPTB having retained planning rights of the unbuilt Watford and Edgware Railway, which had long intended an extension of the EH&LR's Edgware branch towards Watford. A new depot at Aldenham, just before the Bushey Heath terminus, would also be constructed to house additional trains. As a result of the project's name, the Morden–Edgware line was renamed as the Northern line on 28 August 1937.

Work began on the extensions in 1936, as did that on Bushey Heath following its authorisation in 1937, with completion projected by 1941. The tunnelling northwards from Archway was the first element to be completed and an initial service to the rebuilt East Finchley station commenced on 3 July 1939, though trains skipped the deep-level platforms at Highgate until its fitout was completed by 19 January 1941.

Further progress was disrupted by the start of the Second World War in September 1939; however enough development had been made to complete the electrification of the High Barnet branch, over which tube services started on 14 April 1940, and the single-track LNER line to Edgware being electrified as far as Mill Hill East, reopening as a tube service on 18 May 1941 to serve the nearby Inglis Barracks. The partially-complete depot at Aldenham was converted into an aircraft factory, constructing Handley Page Halifax bombers as part of the war effort. Other work on the extension that were eventually halted included the construction of a viaduct at Brockley Hill and a tunnel near Elstree South which started in June 1939, the laying of a second line as far as Mill Hill (The Hale) and the construction of its second platform.

Independent of the Northern Heights plan was an intention to introduce nine-car trains on the Northern line as a response to severe overcrowding. While several surface station platforms were lengthened to accommodate two additional cars, the deep-level platforms could not be easily rebuilt, although Highgate's new platforms were built with nine-car trains in mind, so selective door operation was introduced whereby two cars of the train had its doors locked in the tunnel. Nine-car operations began in November 1937 between Edgware and Kennington via Charing Cross, with ten new 1938 Stock trains being fitted with selective door operation. By the start of war, nine-car trains were discontinued and never revived.

After the war, much of the area beyond Edgware was made part of the Metropolitan Green Belt that largely prevented the anticipated residential development, thus the demand for services from Bushey Heath vanished. A compromise was offered to make Brockley Hill the line's terminus and retain a link to Aldenham Depot, but the Bushey Heath extension was cancelled in 1950. Despite efforts made to complete Aldenham Depot as an Underground facility, in December 1947 it was modified for use as a heavy repair works of bus bodies, supposedly temporarily until Aldenham was required for railway purposes. Following the extension's cancellation, the depot was converted into an overhaul facility for buses, serving this purpose until 1986.

The introduction of electric trains to High Barnet and Mill Hill East and improved bus services undermined passenger numbers on the remaining LNER-operated lines. Consequently, the Alexandra Palace branch line via the surface platforms at Highgate ceased to passenger traffic on 3 July 1954, with the last elements of the Northern Heights plan also being dropped that year, the available funds directed towards completing the eastern extension of the Central line instead. Passenger services to Mill Hill (The Hale) and Edgware, having been suspended in September 1939 to allow works to be completed, never resumed but tickets continued to be sold for Mill Hill (The Hale) until the late 1960s, with passengers being directed onto the 240 bus to connect with the Underground. Freight-hauled mainline trains continued to run on the branch lines until 1964.

The connection between Drayton Park and the surface platforms at Finsbury Park, which gave access onto the Finsbury Park–Highgate line, was retained for rolling stock transfers between the Northern City and Northern line until 29 September 1970, the incomplete electrification necessitating stock being hauled by battery-electric locomotives. Passenger services commenced on the Finsbury Park link in 1976 after the Northern City line transferred to British Rail ownership.

=== Recent developments ===
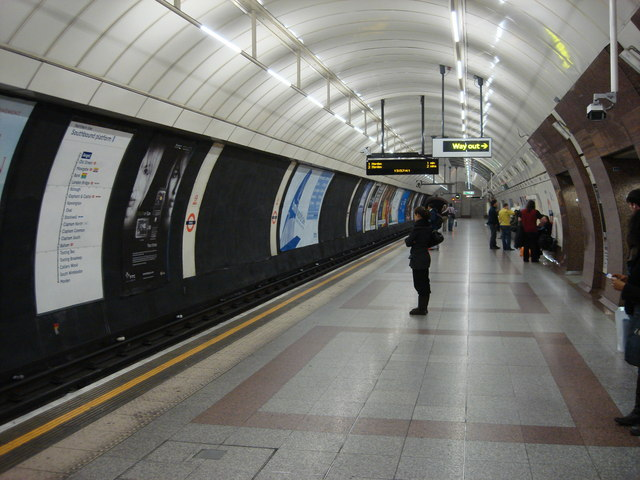
Southbound platform at Angel, the original northbound track having been filled in

In a separate proposal to the New Works Programme, the LPTB looked into extending the Northern line south of Morden to North Cheam as late as 1944 alongside a relief line from Kennington to Epsom via Morden. Further proposals included building additional tunnels between Kennington and Tooting Broadway to relieve congestion, with alternative duplication suggested between Golders Green and Waterloo. In the 1980s, an extension of the Northern line to Peckham Rye and Streatham Hill was proposed as part of a review of potential extensions of Underground lines.

Between 1989 and 1992, Angel tube station was rebuilt with a new northbound tunnel alongside the existing station platforms which were widened to become the new southbound platform, replacing the old narrow platforms which by then had become a safety hazard with increased passenger ridership. A similar project was undertaken at Euston in the 1960s in conjunction with the construction of the Victoria line and at Bank in the early 2020s in order to increase station capacity and improve accessibility.

By the early 1990s, the line had deteriorated due to years of under-investment and the use of old rolling stock, most of which dated back to the early 1960s. The line gained the nickname "Misery Line" due to its perceived unreliability. In 1995, a comprehensive refurbishment of the line began – including track replacement, power upgrades, station modernisation (such as Mornington Crescent) and the replacement of older rolling stock with new 1995 Stock thanks to a public–private partnership deal with Alstom.

The Northern line was originally scheduled to switch to automatic train operation in 2012, using the same SelTrac S40 system as used since 2009 on the Jubilee line and for a number of years on the Docklands Light Railway. Originally the work was to follow on from the Jubilee line so as to benefit from the experience of installing it there, but that project was not completed until spring 2011. Work on the Northern line was contracted to be completed before the 2012 Olympics. It was then undertaken in-house, and TfL predicted the upgrade would be complete by the end of 2014. The first section of the line (West Finchley to High Barnet) was transferred to the new signalling system on 26 February 2013 and the line became fully automated on 1 June 2014, with the Chalk Farm to Edgware via Golders Green section being the last part of the line to switch to ATO.

Since mid-autumn 2016, a 24-hour "Night Tube" service has run on Friday and Saturday nights from Edgware and High Barnet to Morden via the Charing Cross branch; service is suspended on the Bank branch during these times. Trains run every eight minutes between Morden and Camden Town and up to every 16 minutes on the Edgware and High Barnet branches. Labour disputes delayed the planned start date of September 2015.

In January 2018, Transport for London announced that it would double the period during which it runs peak evening services in the central London section to tackle overcrowding. There would now be 24 trains per hour on both central London branches and the northern branches, as well as 30 trains per hour on the Kennington to Morden section between 5 pm and 7 pm.

=== Battersea extension ===
Throughout the 2000s, no plans were considered for extending the Northern line, as the PPP contracts to upgrade the Underground did not include provision for line extensions. This prolonged period without an extension ultimately changed when the Northern line was extended to serve the redevelopment of Battersea Power Station in 2021. Partially funded by private developers, the £1.2bn project extended the Charing Cross branch of the line for 3.2 km (2.0 miles) from Kennington to Battersea Power Station, with an intermediate stop at Nine Elms. Approved by Wandsworth Council in 2010 and TfL in 2014, construction began in 2015. Tunnelling for the project was completed in 2017, and the extension opened on 20 September 2021. Provision has been made for a future extension to Clapham Junction.

== Services ==
=== Peak ===
As of September 2021, morning peak southbound services in trains per hour (tph) are:

- 4 tph from Edgware to Battersea Power Station via Charing Cross
- 2 tph from Edgware to Morden via Charing Cross
- 12 tph from Edgware to Morden via Bank
- 10 tph from High Barnet to Battersea Power Station via Charing Cross
- 2 tph from High Barnet to Morden via Charing Cross
- 8 tph from High Barnet to Morden via Bank
- 2 tph from Mill Hill East to Battersea Power Station via Charing Cross
- 2 tph from Mill Hill East to Morden via Bank

This service pattern provides 20 tph between Finchley Central and High Barnet, 4 tph between Finchley Central and Mill Hill East, 16 tph between Kennington and Battersea Power Station and 22 tph everywhere else on the line except between Kennington and Morden, between Camden Town and Finchley Central and on the Edgware branch where there are 24 tph.

=== Off-peak ===
As of November 2022, off-peak services are the similar to peak services, minus the four hourly trains that run from Morden to the northern branches via Charing Cross:

- 10 tph from Edgware to Battersea Power Station via Charing Cross
- 10 tph from Edgware to Morden via Bank
- 8 tph from High Barnet to Battersea Power Station via Charing Cross
- 8 tph from High Barnet to Morden via Bank
- 2 tph from Mill Hill East to Battersea Power Station via Charing Cross
- 2 tph from Mill Hill East to Morden via Bank

This service pattern provides 16 tph between Finchley Central and High Barnet, 4 tph between Finchley Central and Mill Hill East, and 20 tph everywhere else on the line.

=== Night ===
Since 2016, the Northern line has operated Night Tube services on Friday and Saturday nights between the Edgware and High Barnet termini and Morden via the Charing Cross branch only. Trains run every 15 minutes on each of the northern branches, combining to give eight trains per hour between Camden Town and Morden. There is no Night Tube service on the Mill Hill East, Bank or Battersea branches.

- 4 tph from High Barnet to Morden via Charing Cross
- 4 tph from Edgware to Morden via Charing Cross

=== Map ===
The route of the Northern line

== Stations ==
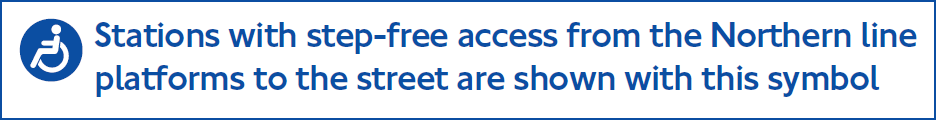
Notice explaining about step-free access. This can be found inside every Northern line train.

=== Open stations ===
==== High Barnet branch ====
Station	Image	Opened	Branch	Additional information
High Barnet		1 April 1872	High Barnet branch	Terminus. Northern line introduced 14 April 1940^{map 1}
Totteridge & Whetstone		1 April 1872	High Barnet branch	Northern line introduced 14 April 1940 ^{map 2}
Woodside Park		1 April 1872	High Barnet branch	Northern line introduced 14 April 1940^{map 3}
West Finchley		1 March 1933	High Barnet branch	Northern line introduced 14 April 1940^{map 4}
Mill Hill East		22 August 1867	Mill Hill branch	Closed 11 September 1939, reopened 18 May 1941^{map 5}
Finchley Central		22 August 1867	High Barnet & Mill Hill branches	First Northern line train was 14 April 1940^{map 6}
East Finchley		22 August 1867	High Barnet branch	First Northern line train was 3 July 1939^{map 7}
Highgate		19 January 1941	High Barnet branch	Disused surface station opened 22 August 1867^{map 8}
Archway		22 June 1907	High Barnet branch	Originally named Highgate^{map 9}
Tufnell Park		22 June 1907	High Barnet branch	^{map 10}
Kentish Town		22 June 1907	High Barnet branch	Mainline station opened 13 July 1868. Connects with National Rail services.^{map 11}

==== Edgware branch ====
Station	Image	Opened	Additional information
Edgware		18 August 1924	Terminus^{map 12}
Burnt Oak		27 October 1924	Opened with its current name, then renamed as "Burnt Oak (Watling)" approximately four years after its opening; was reverted to its original name in 1950.^{map 13}
Colindale		18 August 1924	Used as a terminus for some trains travelling north.^{map 14}
Hendon Central		19 November 1923	^{map 15}
Brent Cross		19 November 1923	Opened as "Brent"; renamed 20 July 1976.^{map 16}
Golders Green		22 June 1907	Originally a terminus; remains a terminus for some trains.^{map 17}
Hampstead		22 June 1907	Originally proposed to be named "Heath Street"; this name can still be seen on wall tilings on station platform walls.^{map 18}
Belsize Park		22 June 1907	One of eight London Underground stations that have deep-level air-raid shelters underneath them. The shelter was constructed in the Second World War to provide safe accommodation for service personnel.^{map 19}
Chalk Farm		22 June 1907	^{map 20}

==== Camden Town ====
Station	Image	Opened	Branch	Additional information
Camden Town		22 June 1907	Edgware, High Barnet, Charing Cross and Bank branches (Note: Charing Cross and Bank branches start immediately south of the station)	The junctions connecting the two northern branches of the Northern line to the two central branches are just south of Camden Town station. The station has a pair of platforms on each of the two northern branches, and southbound trains can depart toward either Charing Cross or Bank from either of the two southbound platforms without crossing over.^{map 21}

==== Charing Cross branch ====
Station	Image	Opened	Additional information
Mornington Crescent		22 June 1907	Was planned to be named "Seymour Street", but this was changed. It was closed on 23 October 1992 to replace the lifts and was reopened on 27 April 1998.^{map 22}
Euston (Charing Cross branch)		22 June 1907	Connects with southbound Northern line service via Bank from platform 6, Victoria line, Lioness line and National Rail services.^{map 23}
Warren Street		22 June 1907	Connects with Victoria line.^{map 24}
Goodge Street		22 June 1907	Opened as "Tottenham Court Road"; renamed 3 September 1908.^{map 25}
Tottenham Court Road		22 June 1907	Connects with Central line and the Elizabeth line.
Leicester Square		22 June 1907	Piccadilly line opened 15 December 1906. Connects with Piccadilly line.^{map 27}
Charing Cross		22 June 1907	Bakerloo line opened as Trafalgar Square 10 March 1906. Stations combined 1 May 1979. Connects with Bakerloo line and National Rail services.^{map 28}
Embankment ( Embankment Pier)		6 April 1914	District Railway opened 30 May 1870. Northern line extension from Charing Cross opened 6 April 1914. Extension from Kennington opened 13 September 1926. Connects with Bakerloo, Circle and District lines.^{map 29}
Waterloo ( Waterloo Pier, Festival Pier)		13 September 1926	Waterloo and City line opened 8 August 1898. Extension from Kennington opened 13 September 1926. Connects with Bakerloo, Jubilee and Waterloo & City lines, and National Rail services.^{map 30}

==== Bank branch ====
Station	Image	Opened	Additional information
Euston (Bank branch)		12 May 1907	Connects with southbound Northern line service via Charing Cross from platform 2, Victoria line, Lioness line and National Rail services.^{map 23}
King's Cross St Pancras ( Trains Gatwick and Luton)		12 May 1907	Metropolitan Railway station opened 10 January 1863. Connects with Circle, Hammersmith & City, Metropolitan, Piccadilly and Victoria lines, National Rail services and Eurostar.^{map 31}
Angel		17 November 1901	Have the longest escalators on the entire Underground network.^{map 32}
Old Street		17 November 1901	Northern line platforms opened February 1904. Connects with National Rail services.^{map 33}
Moorgate		25 February 1900	Metropolitan Railway station opened 23 December 1865. Connects with Circle, Hammersmith & City and Metropolitan lines, and National Rail services.^{map 34} Has an interchange with the Elizabeth line via Liverpool Street station.
Bank		25 February 1900	Linked with Monument by escalator on 18 September 1933. Connects with Central, Circle, District and Waterloo & City lines, and the Docklands Light Railway (DLR).^{map 35}
London Bridge ( Trains to Gatwick and Luton) ( London Bridge City Pier)		25 February 1900	Connects with Jubilee line and National Rail services.^{map 36}
Borough		18 December 1890	^{map 37}
Elephant & Castle		18 December 1890	Connects with Bakerloo line and National Rail services.^{map 38}

==== Kennington ====
Station	Image	Opened	Branch	Additional information
Kennington		18 December 1890	Charing Cross, Bank, Battersea and Morden branches (Note: Morden and Battersea branches start immediately south of the station)	The station has four platforms arranged in two pairs: one pair for northbound services to each central branch of the Northern line, the other pair for southbound services from each central branch. The junctions connecting the central branches to the southern branches are just south of Kennington station. Southbound trains from the Charing Cross branch can terminate at this station, which has a reversing loop, or join either southern branch; southbound trains from the Bank branch can proceed onto the Morden branch but not the Battersea branch.^{map 39}

==== Battersea branch ====
Station	Image	Opened	Additional information
Nine Elms		20 September 2021	
Battersea Power Station		20 September 2021	Terminus

==== Morden branch ====
Station	Image	Opened	Additional information
Oval		18 December 1890	^{map 40}
Stockwell		18 December 1890	Connects with Victoria line. Original terminus until 1900, when the line was extended to Clapham Common. The station platforms were resited south of the original island platform. Formerly a depot existed here; it was branched off from the current southbound track. It is one of the eight stations that have a deep level air-raid shelter.^{map 41}
Clapham North		3 June 1900	One of the two remaining stations to have an island platform underground. It is also one of the eight stations that have a deep level air-raid shelter.^{map 42}
Clapham Common		3 June 1900	Terminus from 1900 to 1926. It is also one of the two remaining stations to have an island platform underground. It is also one of the eight stations that have a deep level air-raid shelter.^{map 43}
Clapham South		13 September 1926	One of the eight stations that have a deep level air-raid shelter.^{map 44}
Balham		6 December 1926	Connects with National Rail services.^{map 45}
Tooting Bec		13 September 1926	Opened as "Trinity Road"; renamed 1 October 1950.^{map 46}
Tooting Broadway		13 September 1926	Used as a terminus for some trains heading south.^{map 47}
Colliers Wood		13 September 1926	^{map 48}
South Wimbledon		13 September 1926	Opened as "South Wimbledon (Merton)". The suffix gradually fell out of use, but still can be seen on some platform signage.^{map 49}
Morden		13 September 1926	Terminus.^{map 50}

=== Closed stations ===
==== Permanently closed stations ====
- King William Street (closed 1900; replaced by Bank)
- City Road (closed 1922)
- South Kentish Town (closed 1924)
- North End (also known as "Bull & Bush". Never opened; work stopped 1906)

==== Resited stations ====
- Stockwell – new platforms resited immediately to the south of its predecessor with the 1922–1924 upgrade of the line.
- London Bridge – the northbound tunnel and platform converted into a concourse, and a new northbound tunnel and platform built in the late 1990s to increase the platform and circulation areas in preparation for the opening of the Jubilee line.

==== Abandoned plans ====
===== Northern Heights stations not transferred from LNER =====
- Highgate – High-level only
- Stroud Green
- Crouch End
- Cranley Gardens
- Muswell Hill
- Alexandra Palace
- Mill Hill (The Hale)

===== Bushey Extension stations not constructed =====
- Brockley Hill
- Elstree South
- Bushey Heath

== Infrastructure ==
=== Rolling stock ===
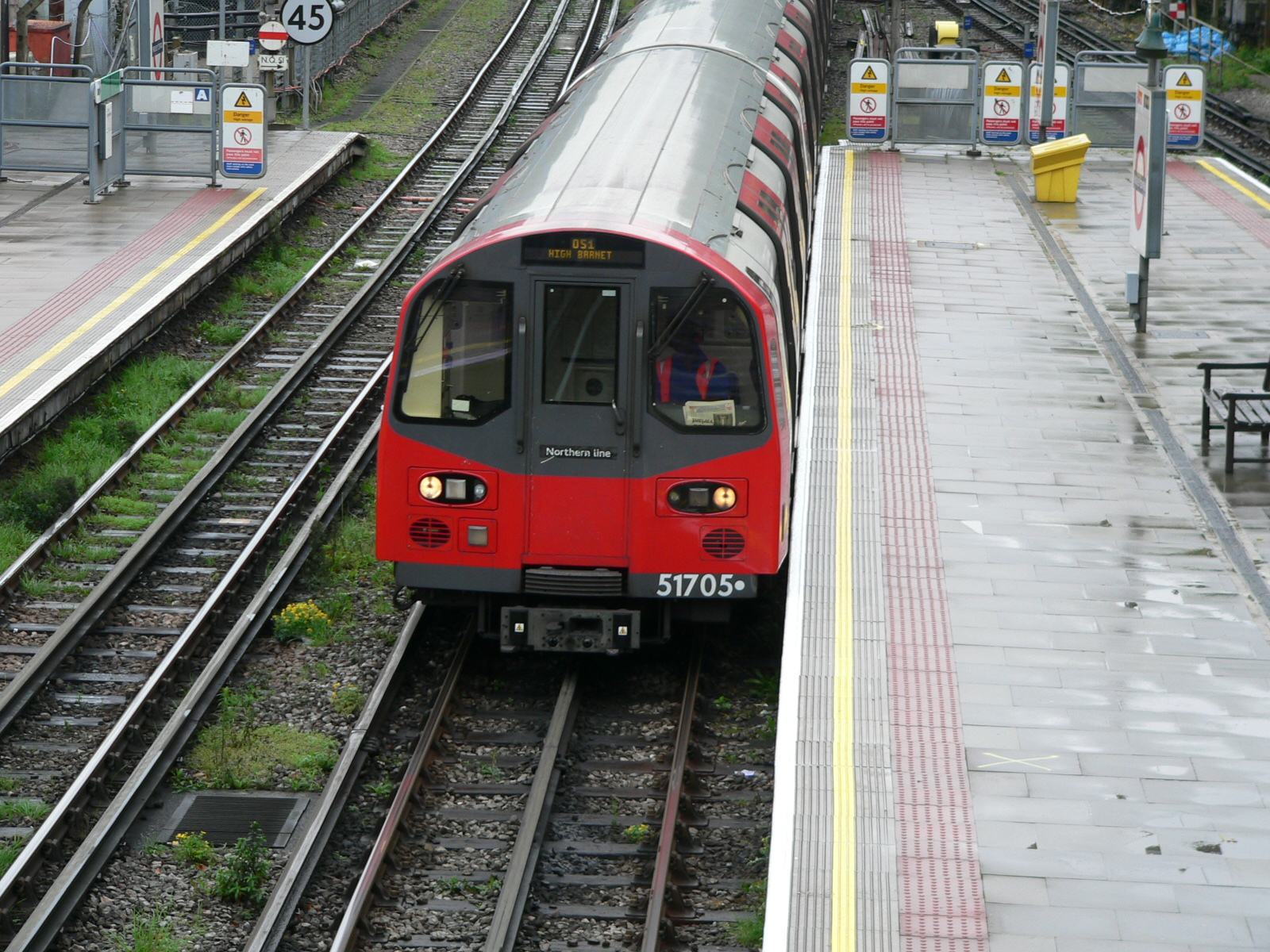
A High Barnet-bound Northern line train arriving at Finchley Central

When the City & South London Railway opened, it was served by small electric locomotives hauling wooden-bodied coaches. These, however, were deemed underpowered and the coaches had poor interior design, combined with lengthy dwell times at termini for turning the train around. Meanwhile, the "Hampstead Tube" used electric multiple units known as the Gate Stock or later the 1906 Stock. Both of these were replaced by the "Standard Stock", a series of 1920s-built multiple units which also catered for the extension works to Edgware and Morden.

As part of the New Works Programme, a total of 1121 cars of 1938 Stock trains were built between 1938 and 1940 to equip the Northern line and its intended extensions with additional capacity, allowing a cascade of Standard Stock trains onto other lines to replace older rolling stock. These were supplemented with identical trailer and non-driving motor cars in 1949 which allowed a reformation of the stock to ensure seven-car trains were kept throughout the fleet.

From the late 1960s, the 1938 Stock began to show reliability issues and long-term industrial action at Acton Works, which supplied the air compressors for them, led to cancellations of up to one-third of Northern line trains and short-formations becoming frequent. In prospect of the Piccadilly line extension to Heathrow Airport and a new fleet of trains for that line (coming in the form of the 1973 Stock), the existing 1956 and 1959 Stock trains were planned to be transferred to the Northern line, with thirty remaining 1938 Stock trains being refurbished to make up the shortfall. However, the relatively short timeframe of rolling stock cascades, owing to the imminent start of the Piccadilly line extension, meant that an equivalent number of new trains were instead ordered based on the Victoria line's 1967 Stock, these becoming known as the 1972 "Mark I" Stock which also entered service that year. The coexisting construction of the Jubilee line also prompted an additional 33 trains of 1972 "Mark II" Stock to run on the Northern line.

Transfers of 1956 and 1959 Stock began in 1975, which coincided with the 1972 Mark II Stock being transferred onto the Bakerloo line prior to the Jubilee line's opening in 1979. With the introduction of the first batch of 1983 Stock on the Jubilee line, half of the 1972 Mark II Stock returned to the Northern line to enable the some 1959 Stocks to transfer to the Bakerloo line as a stopgap to replace the final remainder of the 1938 Stock in November 1985. However, resurgence in passenger numbers from the mid-1980s ironically resulted in five 1938 Stock trains to be renovated and returned to service on the Northern line from 1986. The introduction of the second batch of 1983 Stock prompted the transfer of all 1972 Mark II Stocks onto the Bakerloo line which handed the 1959 Stocks back to the Northern line for the final withdrawal of 1938 Stock trains in May 1988.

Following the introduction of the 1992 Stock on the Central line, some 1962 Stock trains transferred to the Northern line in 1994 to replace the non-standard 1956 Stock trains. While a new fleet of trains were looked upon by the Underground, budget constraints and the mid-life age of the 1972 Mark I Stock gave way to the idea of retaining and refurbishing the latter while running alongside the new trains. The 1972 Stock began to be refurbished in 1994 to a similar level to those of the Mark II Stock except for the immediate conversion to one-person operation which was expected to occur later. However, only three trains were completed before a Private finance initiative deal between London Underground and Alstom was made for the procurement of 106 new trains coming in the form of the 1995 Stock which eliminated any non-standard fleets. Their introduction began in 1998 and withdrawals of the existing stock took place from that year, with the final "Silver train" being a 1959 Stock train running in service on 27 January 2000.

Today, all Northern line trains consist of the 1995 Stock. In common with the other deep-level lines, the trains are the smaller of the two loading gauges used on the system. If the proposed split of the line takes place (initial estimates of 2018 having been abandoned to focus on completion of the Battersea and Nine Elms extension work), 19 new trains will be added to the existing fleet of 106 trains, though additional trains beyond the extra 19 trains may be required to provide a full service for the new Battersea extension.

=== Tunnels ===
Although two other London Underground lines operate fully underground, the Northern line is unusual in that it is a deep-level tube line that serves the outer suburbs of South London yet there is only one station above ground (Morden tube station) while the rest of this part of the line is deep below ground. The short section to Morden depot is also above ground. This is partly because its southern extension into the outer suburbs was not done by taking over an existing surface line as was generally the case with routes such as the Central, Jubilee and Piccadilly lines. Apart from the core central underground tunnels, part of the section between Hendon and Colindale is also underground. As bicycles are not allowed in tunnel sections (even if no station is in that section) as they would hinder evacuation, they are limited to High Barnet – East Finchley, the Mill Hill East branch, Edgware – Colindale and Hendon Central – Golders Green. There are also time-based restrictions for the sections where bicycles are allowed.

The tunnel from Morden to East Finchley via Bank, 17 miles 528 yards (27.841 km), was for a time the longest rail tunnel in the world. Other tunnels, including the Channel Tunnel that links the UK and France, are now longer.

=== Depots ===
The Northern line is serviced by four depots. The main one is at Golders Green^{map 51}, adjacent to Golders Green tube station, while the second, at Morden,^{map 52} is south of Morden tube station and is the larger of the two. The other two are at Edgware and Highgate. The Highgate depot is on the former LNER branch to Alexandra Palace. There was originally a depot at Stockwell, but this closed in 1915. There are sidings at High Barnet for stabling trains overnight.

== Potential splitting ==
Since the 2000s, TfL has aspired to split the Northern line into two routes. Running trains between all combinations of branches and the two central sections, as at present, means only 24 trains an hour can run through each of the central sections at peak times, because merging trains have to wait for each other at the junctions at Camden Town and Kennington. Completely segregating the routes could allow 36 trains an hour on all parts of the line, increasing capacity by around 25%.

TfL has already separated the Charing Cross and Bank branches during off-peak periods; however, four trains per hour still run to and from Morden via Charing Cross in the peak; the northern branches to Edgware and High Barnet cannot be separated until Camden Town station is upgraded to cope with the numbers of passengers changing trains. The extension to Battersea would allow the Charing Cross branch to terminate at Battersea Power Station.

The proposed split of the Northern line would require Camden Town station to be expanded and upgraded, as the station is already severely overcrowded at weekend peak times, and a split would increase the number of passengers wishing to change trains at the station. In 2005, London Underground failed to secure planning permission for a comprehensive upgrade plan for Camden Town tube station that would have involved demolition of the existing station entrance and several other surface-level buildings, all within a conservation area. New redevelopment plans were first announced in 2013 by TfL, which proposed avoiding the existing station entrance and the conservation area by building a second entrance and interchange tunnels to the north, mostly on the site of a subsequently vacated infant school. In 2018, plans to upgrade and rebuild Camden Town station were placed indefinitely on hold, due to TfL's financial situation. As of 2024, TfL said they still "aspire" to split the line. A partial separation was proposed in which all trains from Morden would operate via Bank, while those starting at Kennington (or Battersea) would serve the Charing Cross branch. The High Barnet and Edgware branches would remain served by trains from both routes.

== Incidents and accidents ==
In October 2003, a train derailed at Camden Town. Although no one was hurt, points, signals and carriages were damaged. Concern was raised about the safety of the Tube, given the derailment at Chancery Lane earlier in 2003. A joint report by the Underground and its maintenance contractor Tube Lines concluded that poor track geometry was the main cause, and therefore extra friction arising out of striations (scratches) on a newly installed set of points had allowed the leading wheel of the last carriage to climb the rail and derail. The track geometry at the derailment site is a very tight bend and tight tunnel bore, which precludes the normal solution for this sort of geometry of canting the track by raising the height of one rail relative to the other.

In August 2010, a defective rail grinding train caused disruption on the Charing Cross branch, after it travelled four miles in 13 minutes without a driver. The train was being towed to the depot after becoming faulty. At Archway station, the defective train became detached and ran driverless until coming to a stop at an incline near Warren Street station. This caused morning rush-hour services to be suspended on this branch. All passenger trains were diverted via the Bank branch, with several not stopping at stations until they were safely on the Bank branch.

== In popular culture ==
- In his debut novel Ghostwritten, David Mitchell characterises the Northern line as "the psycho of the family".
- The Bloc Party song "Waiting For the 7.18" references the Northern line as "the loudest".
- As part of a series of twelve books tied to the twelve lines of the London Underground, A Northern Line Minute focuses on the Northern line.
- The New Vaudeville Band's 1967 song "Finchley Central" ("On Tour" in the US) mentions several stations on the line.
- The Nick Drake song "Parasite" references the Northern Line.
- The 1982 Robyn Hitchcock song "Fifty Two Stations" begins, "There's fifty-two stations on the Northern Line/None of them is yours, one of them is mine."
- The 2021 Maisie Peters song "Elvis Song" begins, "Cold bench on a platform/Last train on the Northern Line."

== Maps ==
- ^map 1High Barnet – 51°39′02″N 000°11′39″W
- ^map 2Totteridge & Whetstone – 51°37′50″N 000°10′45″W
- ^map 3Woodside Park – 51°37′05″N 000°11′08″W
- ^map 4West Finchley – 51°36′34″N 000°11′18″W
- ^map 5Mill Hill East – 51°36′30″N 000°12′37″W
- ^map 6Finchley Central – 51°36′04″N 000°11′33″W
- ^map 7East Finchley – 51°35′14″N 000°09′54″W
- ^map 8Highgate – 51°34′40″N 000°08′45″W
- ^map 9Archway – 51°33′56″N 000°08′06″W
- ^map 10Tufnell Park – 51°33′24″N 000°08′17″W
- ^map 11Kentish Town – 51°33′01″N 000°08′26″W
- ^map 12Edgware – 51°36′50″N 000°16′30″W
- ^map 13Burnt Oak – 51°36′10″N 000°15′50″W
- ^map 14Colindale – 51°35′44″N 000°15′00″W
- ^map 15Hendon Central – 51°34′59″N 000°13′34″W
- ^map 16Brent Cross – 51°34′36″N 000°12′49″W
- ^map 17Golders Green – 51°34′19″N 000°11′38″W
- ^map 18Hampstead – 51°33′25″N 000°10′42″W
- ^map 19Belsize Park – 51°33′01″N 000°09′52″W
- ^map 20Chalk Farm – 51°32′39″N 000°09′12″W
- ^map 21Camden Town – 51°32′22″N 000°08′34″W
- ^map 22Mornington Crescent – 51°32′04″N 000°08′19″W
- ^map 23Euston – 51°31′42″N 000°07′59″W
- ^map 24Warren Street – 51°31′29″N 000°08′18″W
- ^map 25Goodge Street – 51°31′15″N 000°08′04″W
- ^map 26Tottenham Court Road – 51°30′58″N 000°07′51″W
- ^map 27Leicester Square – 51°30′41″N 000°07′41″W
- ^map 28Charing Cross – 51°30′29″N 000°07′29″W
- ^map 29Embankment – 51°30′25″N 000°07′19″W
- ^map 30Waterloo – 51°30′09″N 000°06′47″W
- ^map 31King's Cross St Pancras – 51°31′49″N 000°07′27″W
- ^map 32Angel – 51°31′55″N 000°06′22″W
- ^map 33Old Street – 51°31′33″N 000°05′14″W
- ^map 34Moorgate – 51°31′07″N 000°05′19″W
- ^map 35Bank-Monument – 51°30′47″N 000°05′17″W
- ^map 36London Bridge – 51°30′18″N 000°05′10″W
- ^map 37Borough – 51°30′04″N 000°05′35″W
- ^map 38Elephant & Castle – 51°29′40″N 000°05′59″W
- ^map 39Kennington – 51°29′19″N 000°06′20″W
- ^map 40Oval – 51°28′55″N 000°06′45″W
- ^map 41Stockwell – 51°28′21″N 000°07′20″W
- ^map 42Clapham North – 51°27′54″N 000°07′48″W
- ^map 43Clapham Common – 51°27′42″N 000°08′19″W
- ^map 44Clapham South – 51°27′10″N 000°08′51″W
- ^map 45Balham – 51°26′33″N 000°09′07″W
- ^map 46Tooting Bec – 51°26′09″N 000°09′35″W
- ^map 47Tooting Broadway – 51°25′40″N 000°10′06″W
- ^map 48Colliers Wood – 51°25′06″N 000°10′42″W
- ^map 49South Wimbledon – 51°24′56″N 000°11′31″W
- ^map 50Morden – 51°24′08″N 000°11′42″W
- ^map 51Golders Green depot – 51°34′22″N 000°11′35″W
- ^map 52Morden depot – 51°23′51″N 000°11′49″W

== See also ==
- T. P. Figgis, architect of the City and South London Railway's original stations
- Leslie Green, architect of the Charing Cross, Euston and Hampstead Railway's early stations
- List of crossings of the River Thames
- London deep-level shelters, most of which are under Northern line stations
- Tunnels underneath the River Thames
