= King's Cross station =

King's Cross station or Kings Cross station may refer to:

== England ==
- London King's Cross railway station, a mainline terminus in London
- King's Cross St Pancras tube station, a London Underground station
- King's Cross Thameslink railway station, a disused railway station in London

== Other places ==
- Kings Cross railway station, Sydney, in Sydney, Australia
- King's Cross station, on the Hogwarts Express railway within the Universal Orlando Resort, in Florida, United States

== See also ==
- King's Cross (disambiguation)
