= Elstree South tube station =

Cancelled London Underground station

Elstree South
- Interactive map of Elstree South

General information
- Location: Elstree
- Local authority: Hertsmere
- Grid reference: TQ175946
- Number of platforms: 2 (planned but not built)

Railway companies
- Original company: London Underground

Other information
- Coordinates: 51.63794°N 0.30349°W

Elstree South (usually just Elstree on Underground maps) was a proposed London Underground station in Elstree, Hertfordshire. It was designed by Charles Holden. The planned location of the station was adjacent to the A5183, north of the junction with the A41 and where junction 4 of the M1 motorway was subsequently built.

== History ==
=== Planning and construction ===
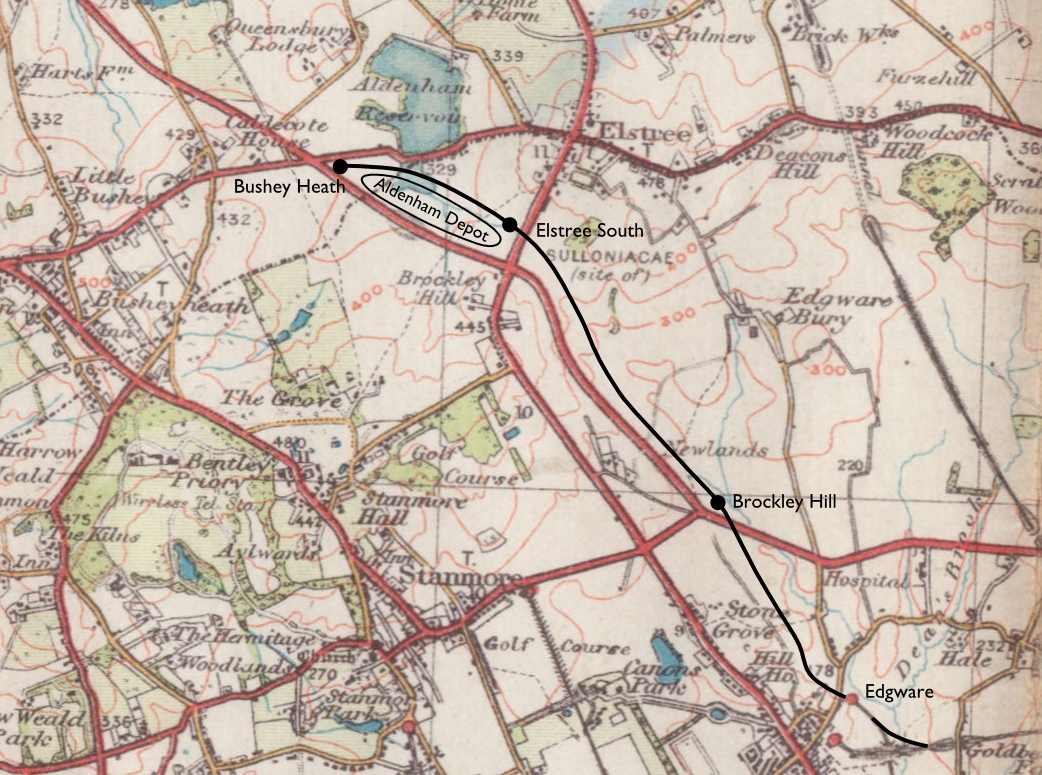
Planned route of the Bushey Heath extension superimposed on a 1934 map showing the rural nature of the area

The station was the second of three planned by London Passenger Transport Board (LPTB) in 1935 for an extension of the Northern line from Edgware to Bushey Heath. There was debate about the name for the station, with Elstree Hill and Elstree being proposed. (Note: A protracted, series of discussions within the LPTB and with other interested parties took place during 1937 and 1938. The name used during much of planning stages was "Elstree", linked to the nearby village. The final choice of Elstree South was made in May 1938 to avoid confusion with the mainline station at Elstree & Borehamwood)

The extension was part of the Northern Heights project which was intended to electrify a number of steam-operated London and North Eastern Railway (LNER) branch lines and to incorporate them into the Northern line. Much of the land for the extension came from the purchase in 1922 by the LPTB's precursor, the Underground Electric Railways Company of London, of the unbuilt Watford and Edgware Railway (W&ER). The W&ER had planned an extension of the Edgware, Highgate and London Railway to Watford Junction via Bushey, but it had never raised the capital required and its powers to construct a line had expired in 1911. The specific route to Bushey Heath was approved by parliament in October 1937. The LPTB's principal purpose for the extension to Elstree was to stimulate the development of new residential areas to increase passenger numbers. A secondary purpose was to provide a location suitable for a large new depot that was required to accommodate and maintain the new fleet of 1938 Stock trains to be used across the existing Northern line and the lines taken over from the LNER. (Note: The Northern line's depot at Golders Green and the Northern City line's depot at Drayton Park were poorly arranged and unsuitable for the accommodation and maintenance of the new trains. The LPTB considered constructing a new depot alongside the LNER's line between Finchley Central and Edgware, but could not negotiate a deal with the local authority for a suitable site in time to enable the depot to be built before the new rolling stock was to be delivered.) (Note: The arrangement of the depot at Aldenham located between Elstree South and Bushey Heath was intended to be similar to that between Oakwood and Cockfosters on the recently opened Piccadilly line extension.)

Elstree South station was to be located in a cutting with the platforms immediately north of the portals for a pair of 1,575-foot (480 m) long tunnels through a hill towards Brockley Hill. Immediately north of the station were the junctions to the depot and a pair of depot sidings would have occupied the station cutting on the south side. The station building, designed by Charles Holden, would have had a statue of a Roman Centurion at one end reflecting, inspired by the nearby site of the Roman settlement of Sulloniacae.

As part of the station works, the road in front of the station, Elstree Hill (now Elstree Hill South), was to be widened to 100 feet (30 m) to accommodate a planned trunk road improvement scheme for the A5 road (now renumbered the A5183 at this point).

How Elstree South station might have appeared on the London Underground Map if the Northern line extension from Edgware to Bushey Heath and Mill Hill East had been built

Construction works on the Northern Heights project began in the late 1930s but were interrupted by the outbreak of the Second World War. Most of the work undertaken to that date had been carried out on the existing LNER branch tracks but work between Edgware and Bushey Heath had started in June 1939. The route of the line had been cleared and laid out and some earthworks and tunnelling carried out between Edgware and Elstree South. (Note: The tunnels were partly bored and reused cast iron tunnel segments removed from Central line and Bakerloo line tunnels when they had been enlarged to provide longer platforms. The lines' tunnels had originally been constructed by the Central London Railway and the Baker Street and Waterloo Railway in the late 1890s and early 1900s and the diameter was 3.75 inches (9.5 cm) smaller than that being used by the LPTB in the 1930s. To increase the diameter, the segments were packed-out with inserts of treated wood and cast iron at four points in each ring.)

Following the outbreak of war in Europe, work on the extension was suspended in September 1939 and was formally terminated in December of the same year as wartime funding restrictions would prevent completion. (Note: When the works stopped, 160 feet (49 m) of the north-bound tunnel and 70 feet (21 m) of the southbound tunnel had been bored from the south end. At Elstree South, the only work undertaken was the start of construction of an electrical sub-station.) During the war years, the LPTB-owned land was used for farming vegetables for staff canteens.

=== Cancellation ===
The sites of all three new stations were in semi-rural locations and, as it had elsewhere, it was intended that the opening of the new section of Underground line would stimulate the construction of new residential estates that the stations would then serve. After the war, new legislation was introduced to limit the continuing expansion of urban areas into their surrounding countryside. This legislation created the Metropolitan Green Belt around London and the area designated included the area covered by the new Northern line extension. Without the possibility of constructing the new housing estates, the new line had no purpose and the plans for the extension were cancelled in 1950.

The tunnelling shields were removed in 1949 and the tunnels sealed. The entrances were finally buried in the 1960s when the M1 motorway was constructed and today nothing is visible on the surface.

== See also ==
- Edgware, Highgate and London Railway - LNER branch line taken over by London Underground as part of the Northern Heights project

== Notes and references ==
=== Bibliography ===
- Beard, Tony (2002). By Tube Beyond Edgware. Capital Transport. ISBN 978-1-85414-246-7.
- Horne, Mike (2009) [1990]. The Northern Line, An Illustrated History (3rd ed.). Capital Transport. ISBN 978-1-85414-326-6.

Abandoned Northern Heights Extension
Preceding station	London Underground	Following station
Bushey Heath Terminus	Northern line	Brockley Hill towards Morden or Kennington
