= New Works Programme =

1930s London transport investment programme

The New Works Programme of 1935–1940 was the major investment programme delivered by the London Passenger Transport Board (LPTB), commonly known as London Transport, which had been created in 1933 to coordinate underground train, tram, trolleybus and bus services in the capital and the surrounding areas. The programme was to develop many aspects of the public transport services run by the LPTB and the suburban rail services of the Great Western Railway (GWR) and London and North Eastern Railway (LNER). The investment was largely backed by government assistance as well as by the issuing of financial bonds and was estimated to cost £42,286,000 in 1936 (approximately £2.58 billion today).

== London Underground ==
The Programme saw major reconstructions of many central area Underground stations, with escalators being installed to replace lifts; extensions of several tube lines; and connection to and electrification of a number of suburban lines. These included:

- Metropolitan line (The majority of projects had been initially planned by the Metropolitan Railway, the owner of the line prior to absorption into the LPTB in 1933.)
  - provision of additional parallel tracks between Harrow-on-the-Hill and Rickmansworth
  - electrification of the tracks from Rickmansworth to Aylesbury and Chesham
  - installation of colourlight signals on the line between Rickmansworth and Aylesbury and platform extensions for stations on this stretch of the line
- Bakerloo line
  - new tunnels to form a branch from Baker Street to Finchley Road, where they connected with and took over the realigned slow tracks of the Metropolitan line to Wembley Park and the Stanmore branch
  - new Bakerloo line stations at St John's Wood and Swiss Cottage between Finchley Road and Baker Street, to replace three closing stations on the Metropolitan line
- Northern line (The Northern Heights Plan)
  - transfer of the Metropolitan line's Great Northern & City (GN&C) branch to Northern line operation
  - connection of the GN&C branch at Finsbury Park to the LNER's line to Edgware, High Barnet and Alexandra Palace
  - construction of new tunnels from Archway (then Highgate) to Highgate and East Finchley to connect to the Edgware and High Barnet branches
  - extension from Edgware to Bushey Heath

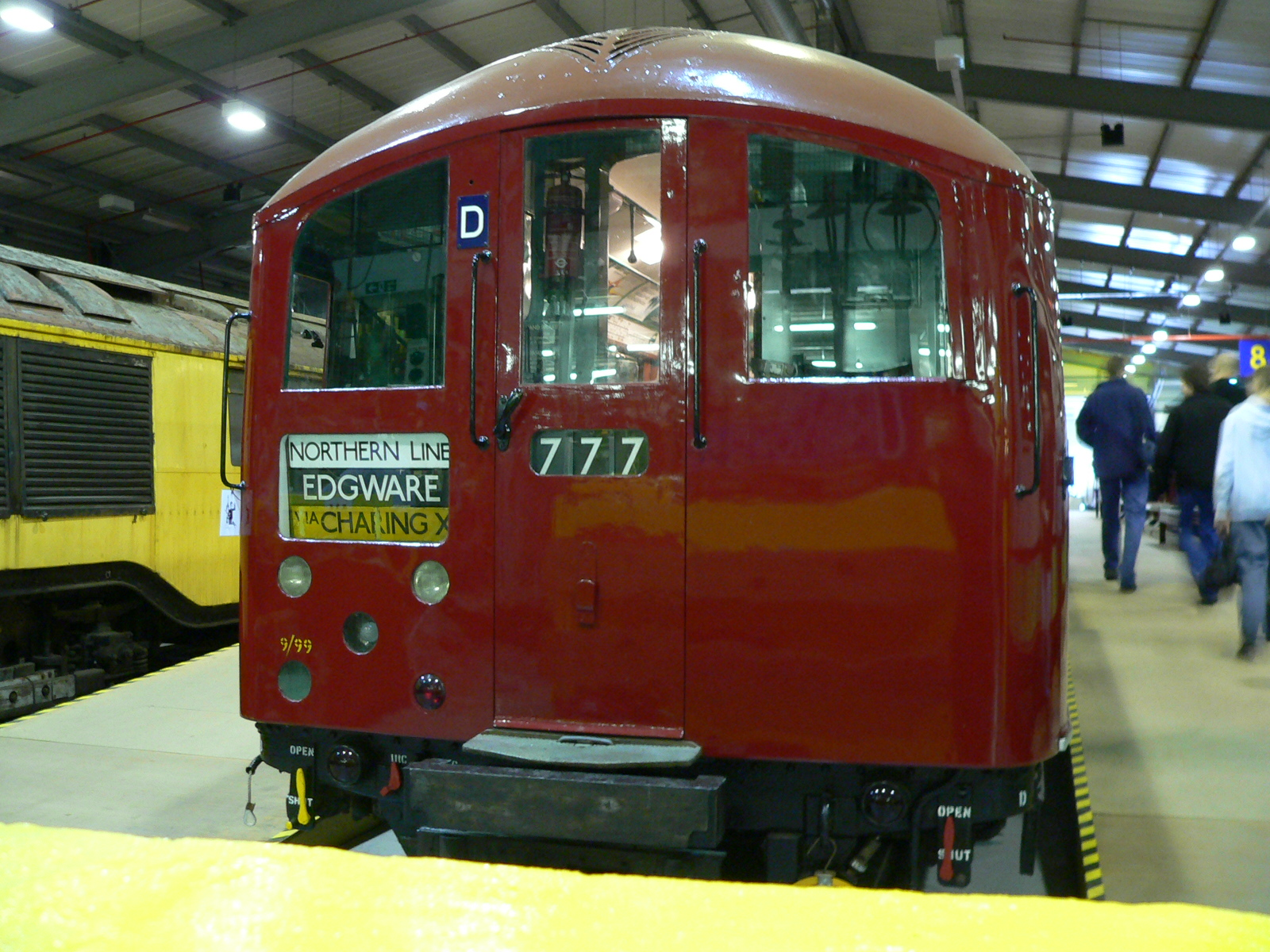
1938 tube train, one aspect of the New Works Programme

- Central line
  - relining of the tunnels and lengthening of station platforms between Shepherd's Bush and Liverpool Street to increase speeds and allow longer trains
  - replacement of the line's non-standard track power supply with the Underground's normal fourth rail system
  - western extension from North Acton to connect to and take over the GWR's suburban line to Denham
  - eastern extension from Liverpool Street via Stratford to connect to and take over the LNER's lines to Epping, Ongar and Hainault
- Rolling stock
  - design and construction of a new fleet of trains, the 1938 stock, to operate on the Central line and Northern line extensions
  - further conversion of existing locomotive-hauled "Dreadnought" coaches to electric working for the newly electrified Metropolitan Mainline to Aylesbury. Extra "T" stock driving motor coaches had been constructed to allow for this. This scheme was abandoned and later new stock was designed. When rolled out, this was to be the A60 stock
  - Design and construction of a new fleet of trains for the Hammersmith and City Line, the "O" stock
  - Provision of similar new trains for the Metropolitan line to Uxbridge, the "P" stock
  - Conversion of existing hand-worked-door stock to air-door operation and the construction of some new stock for the District line, the "Q" stock programme
- Infrastructure
  - improvements to the power supply system from Lots Road Power Station
  - improvements to and rebuilding of many busy central area stations including the installation of escalators to replace lifts

== Road transport ==
On the city's roads, the programme was to see the large-scale abandonment of trams and their replacement by trolleybuses, creating the world's largest trolleybus system at that date.

== Results and interruption ==
=== Before and during World War II ===
Substantial and rapid progress was made on the network across the capital before the advent of World War II delayed, then prevented its completion. The Central line tunnel relining works were completed in 1938 and the replacement of the line's power supply was completed in 1940. The Bakerloo line service to Stanmore started on 20 November 1939. The 1938 tube stock came into operation as intended although the extensions they were built for were not completed at once.

Progress on the Northern line works enabled the extension from Archway to come into service as far as East Finchley on 3 July 1939 (excluding Highgate station), where interchanges were made with the LNER services. Underground services to High Barnet commenced on 14 April 1940. Highgate station came into use on 19 January 1941 and services started operating on the branch to Mill Hill East on 18 May 1941. This latter section was finished, exceptionally, to serve Inglis Barracks. The outstanding electrification works on the remainder of the LNER's branch from Finsbury Park to Highgate, from Highgate to Alexandra Palace and from Mill Hill East to Edgware were halted. Works on the extension beyond Edgware were also stopped, although the construction of the new tube depot at Aldenham was completed and the buildings were used to construct Halifax bomber aircraft for the RAF. Other parts of the land purchased for the Bushey Heath extension were farmed during the war to provide food for London Transport canteens.

On the Central line, works on the eastern extension had progressed furthest with tunnels constructed to Leyton and from Leytonstone to Newbury Park. These were put into service as air-raid shelters (with disastrous results at Bethnal Green) and as underground factories operated by Plessey.

=== Postwar changes ===
After the war, a prioritisation of the limited resources available to London Transport saw the Central line extensions progressed, with the first new section in the east opening to Stratford in 1946 and the services to West Ruislip and Epping starting in 1948 and 1949. Initially, plans were put in place to complete the Northern Heights project during 1947 and 1948 and the plans for the extension to Bushey Heath were revised and legal powers granted by the act of Parliament were renewed in 1947 for most of the outstanding New Works Programme.

The cases for the Northern line extension to Bushey Heath and the continuation of the Central line extension beyond West Ruislip to Denham were damaged by the introduction of the Town and Country Planning Act 1947, which led to the creation of Metropolitan Green Belt around the capital including areas of land through which the new lines were planned and which had been intended for development as housing. Plans for the Bushey Heath Extension were reduced to an extension to Brockley Hill in 1949. In 1953 the decision was made to cancel this part as well.

The GN&C branch had transferred to the Northern line before the war and remained under its control after the war, but it was never integrated into the rest of the line. The completion of the electrification of the LNER's remaining tracks from Finsbury Park to Alexandra Palace and from Mill Hill East to Edgware was abandoned, and equipment already installed was removed for reuse elsewhere. The bridge, just east of Mill Hill East, was rebuilt with provision for a second track, which was never laid. The Finsbury Park-to-Alexandra Palace section remained with the LNER, and then British Railways, until it was closed in 1954. The Mill Hill-to-Edgware section, which had been closed to passenger traffic, remained in use as a single-track goods line until closed in 1964.

The electrification of the Metropolitan line from Rickmansworth to Amersham and Chesham was not completed until 12 September 1960. and the quadrupling of the tracks was not completed until 1961, but only to a point north of Moor Park. The complete re-signalling of the line north of Rickmansworth was done by 1959. As electrification did not take place all the way north to Aylesbury, the Metropolitan line service north of Amersham was withdrawn in 1961. The plan to convert locomotive-hauled steam stock to electric working was abandoned, and new EMUs, designed in the 1950s, replaced existing steam and electric locomotives from 1960. They were called the A60 stock.

The scheme to replace trams with trolleybuses was halted shortly after the outbreak of war, with the final conversion taking place on 9 June 1940. The remaining tram routes, mainly in South London, were not finally replaced until 6 July 1952, and then by diesel buses, rather than trolleybuses. The Aldenham site was converted for use as a bus overhaul works for all London Transport buses and opened in 1955.
