= Drayton Park railway station =

National Rail station in London, England

Drayton Park
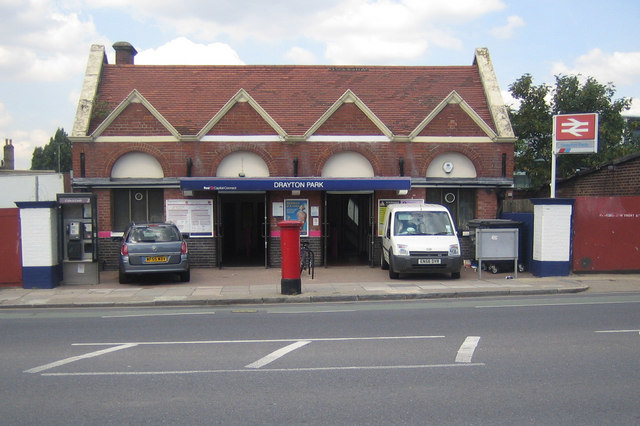
- Entrance to Drayton Park station
- Interactive map of Drayton Park

General information
- Location: Highbury
- Local authority: London Borough of Islington
- Managed by: Great Northern
- Owner: Network Rail
- Station code: DYP
- DfT category: E
- Number of platforms: 2
- Fare zone: 2

National Rail annual entry and exit
- 2020–21: ▼0.174 million
- 2021–22: ▲0.358 million
- 2022–23: ▲0.517 million
- 2023–24: ▲0.642 million
- 2024–25: ▲0.729 million

Key dates
- 14 February 1904: Opened (GN&CR)
- 3 October 1964: Became terminus
- 4 October 1975: Closed (Northern line)
- 8 August 1976: Reopened as through station (British Rail)

Other information
- External links: Departures; Facilities
- Coordinates: 51.5528°N 0.1055°W

Drayton Park is a National Rail station in Highbury, in the London Borough of Islington. It is on the Northern City Line between Highbury & Islington and Finsbury Park stations, 2 miles 56 chains (4.3 km) down the line from Moorgate; it is in London fare zone 2.

The station is operated by Great Northern. It is just off the Holloway Road near its southern end, close to the Liverpool Road junction. It stands in the shadow of Arsenal football club's Emirates Stadium, but is shut prior to weekend matches and after all matches due to safety concerns of hosting fans on the station's narrow island platform.

== History ==
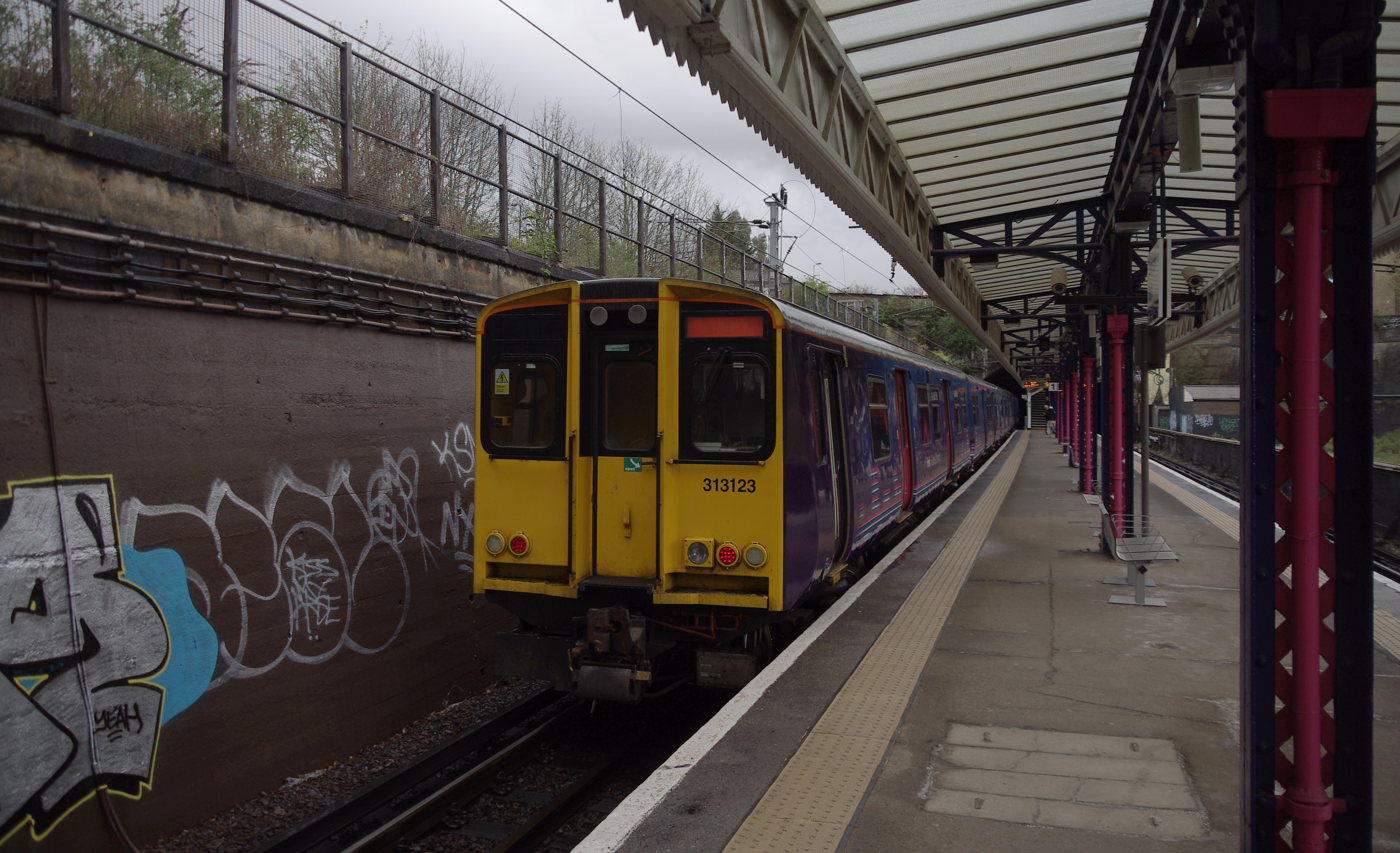
Class 313 at Drayton Park

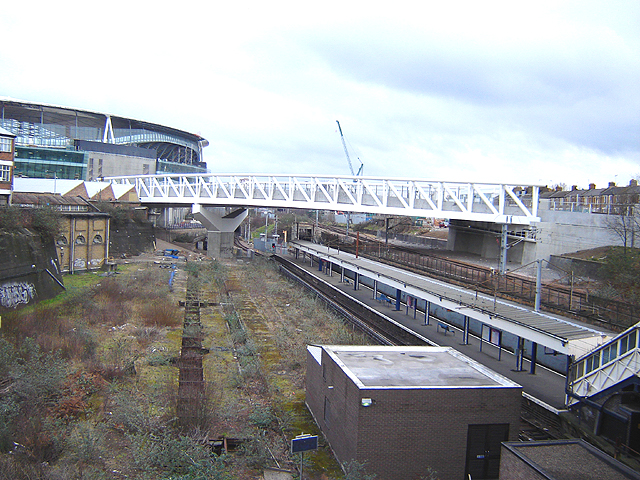
The remnants of the station's stabling yard are visible to the left of the platform, though the area has already been encroached upon by the bridge support for the then unfinished Emirates Stadium. (February 2006)

Drayton Park was opened by the Great Northern & City Railway (GN&CR) on 14 February 1904. The GN&CR was constructed to provide a route for Great Northern Railway (GNR) trains between the GNR station at Finsbury Park and the Metropolitan Railway (MR) and City & South London Railway (C&SLR) station at Moorgate in the City of London. With the exception of Drayton Park station and the former depot which are in a deep cutting, the railway was constructed in deep tube tunnel. The tunnels were constructed with a larger diameter than the other deep-tube railways to accommodate GNR main-line trains, but a dispute between the two companies prevented the GN&CR connecting its tunnels to the GNR platforms at Finsbury Park. The GN&CR tunnels instead terminated beneath Finsbury Park main-line station without a running connection to the surface, rolling stock accessing the line via a yard connection at Finsbury Park.

In 1913 the GN&CR was taken over by the Metropolitan Railway (MR). The MR ran the line under its own name until it became part of the London Passenger Transport Board (LPTB) in 1933. In preparation for the LPTB's "Northern Heights" plan the line was transferred to the control of the Morden-Edgware Line (now the Northern line).

=== Northern heights plan ===
The Northern Heights plan involved the construction of the GN&CR's unbuilt connection from Drayton Park to the surface platforms at Finsbury Park and the transfer of the London and North Eastern Railway (LNER) branches from there to Edgware, High Barnet and Alexandra Palace. By 1939 much of the work for the connection of the lines had been done, including the ramps needed to take the tracks from Drayton Park up to Finsbury Park, and the opening of the connection was scheduled for autumn 1940, but World War II put a halt to further construction.

After the war the plan to incorporate the Alexandra Palace branch into the Underground was cancelled and the branch closed to passengers in the 1950s. No further effort was made to connect the City Line to the main-line platforms (owned after the 1948 nationalisation by British Railways) and Northern line tube trains continued to run in tunnel to Finsbury Park.

=== Truncation of the line and transfer to British Rail ===
Although the Victoria line does not serve Drayton Park, its construction during the 1960s had a significant impact on the station. The City Line tunnels north of Drayton Park were closed on 3 October 1964 and were reused by the Victoria line, which was connected to them south of Finsbury Park. Drayton Park became the northern terminus of the City line, which later became known as the Northern line Highbury Branch.

On 4 October 1975 the line was closed and ceased to be part of the London Underground. The line was transferred to British Rail (BR) and the unused ramps from the cancelled Northern Heights plan finally received the tracks to connect the line to the surface platforms at Finsbury Park. On 8 August 1976 Drayton Park reopened as part of the BR network, with main-line-sized trains running to Old Street. On 8 November 1976, the line was opened for main-line trains from Moorgate to Finsbury Park and beyond, 72 years after the GN&CR opened, as had been originally intended.

Following the transfer of the line from London Transport to British Rail, the tube train car sheds at Drayton Park became redundant. The track in the sheds and outside in the yard had only been used by slow-moving empty tube trains, so was in very good condition. It was purchased by the Ffestiniog Railway in North Wales. The job of lifting and loading it onto a bogie flat wagon fell to volunteers of the London Area Group of the Ffestiniog Railway Society. This was accomplished over about three weekends in June 1977.

Trains on the line have dual power pick-up equipment. In the tunnel section trains use a third rail, and above ground they use overhead line equipment via pantographs. Trains change between the two methods at Drayton Park and the transition may be noticeable as sparks or momentary power blackouts.

== Services ==
All services at Drayton Park are operated by Great Northern using Class 717 EMUs.

The typical off-peak service in trains per hour is:

- 4 tph to Moorgate
- 2 tph to Stevenage via Hertford North
- 2 tph to Welwyn Garden City

During the peak hours, the station is served by an additional half-hourly service between Moorgate and Hertford North and the service between Moorgate and Welwyn Garden City is increased to 4 tph.

Great Northern introduced a weekend and late evening service from 13 December 2015, as part of their franchise requirements.

Preceding station	National Rail	Following station
Finsbury Park	Great Northern Northern City Line	Highbury & Islington
Former service
Preceding station	London Underground	Following station
Finsbury Park Terminus	Metropolitan line Northern City Branch (1913-39)	Highbury & Islington towards Moorgate
Finsbury Park Terminus	Northern line Northern City branch (1939-64)	Highbury & Islington towards Moorgate
Terminus	Northern line Northern City branch (1964-75)	Highbury & Islington towards Moorgate
Abandoned Northern Heights extension
Finsbury Park towards Bushey Heath, High Barnet or Alexandra Palace	Northern line	Highbury & Islington towards Moorgate
