= Aldenham Works =

Former London Transport bus overhaul works

Aldenham Bus Overhaul Works
- Interactive map of the Aldenham Bus Overhaul Works area

General information
- Status: Demolished
- Type: Maintenance works
- Location: Elstree, Hertfordshire, United Kingdom
- Coordinates: 51.639°N 0.308°W
- OS Grid Ref: TQ 171 947
- Completed: 1940s onwards, bus works 1955 onwards
- Inaugurated: October 1956
- Demolished: July 1996

Technical details
- Structural system: steel frame
- Floor area: 72,200 m^{2}; 778,000 sq ft
- Grounds: 21.56 hectares (53.3 acres)

Design and construction
- Known for: Overhauling London Transport buses

The Aldenham Works, or Aldenham Bus Overhaul Works, was the main London Transport bus overhaul works. It was located on the edge of the Hertfordshire village of Elstree and not in Aldenham. In its heyday, 50 buses a week were overhauled there, and it was the most comprehensive bus overhaul operation in the world. It opened in 1956 and closed in November 1986. The buildings were demolished in 1996.

== History ==
=== 1930s Origins ===
The London Transport site at Elstree had originally been bought for the Northern line extension to Bushey Heath, as part of the 1930s New Works Programme. Construction of the railway extension was underway and the tube depot was partially complete at the outbreak of World War II. The railway works were stopped and the site was modified for use as an aircraft factory, producing Handley Page Halifax bombers as part of the London Aircraft Production consortium, together with Handley Page, Duple, Park Royal and London Transport. After the war, the construction of the railway extension was not restarted and the plan was finally dropped in September 1949.

With the wartime bus fleet worn out and the existing Chiswick Works struggling to cope, it was decided to redevelop the site for bus overhaul, specifically body and chassis structures, with Chiswick continuing to specialise in the running units (engines, gearboxes, etc.). Construction of the new facility began in 1952. The existing buildings were extended and converted into a bus overhaul works over a 21.56 hectares (53.3 acres) site, with its own staff canteen, social club and office blocks as well as the famous main building, test circuit and tilt test shed where London buses were subjected to being tilted on an inverter to assess stability. The site also had a power station on site to provide power for the works.

=== Post War ===
Although Aldenham had dealt with new vehicles and accident repairs from about 1945, it did not start full scale overhauling of bus bodies until 1949/50 and until 1955 chassis were still dealt with at Chiswick. This was because, with the RTs, the bodies were jig-built which enabled the bus bodies to be a perfect fit on all the other RT chassis. At first, buses were dealt with on an individual basis, with each chassis and body being re-united after overhaul. A small number of changes of body among the RT family of buses was made during the period up to December 1955, at which point the 'works float' system of overhauling was re-introduced after being suspended during World War II. This meant that vehicle identities were again changed around so as to make full use of licences. In most cases, each bus arriving in the works was replaced by one made up of different parts but carrying the same identity, which meant that it was back on the road the same day in the majority of cases. The system came into full operation in January 1956. The works were officially opened on 30 October 1956, at which date it had a staff of 1,800, which was expected to increase to 2,500.

The post-war standardisation and huge size of the London Transport fleet allowed maintenance along modern production line principles, with work being carried out on a number of buses at once. Several mechanics could focus on specific parts of the vehicle rather than a single mechanic working on a single bus at a time.

Aldenham covered:

- Body rebuilds
- Repaints
- Major accident repairs
- Seat trimming
- Destination blinds
- New bus preparation
- Tilt testing

Aldenham turned the overhaul of buses into an industrial operation. A bus entering the works would first be inspected and any repairs required would be identified. The vehicle would have its body removed from the chassis, and then the running units such as brake system, axles, springs and other safety critical parts apart from the engine and gearbox would be removed from the chassis and would be inspected and, if needed, overhauled (at Chiswick Works). Each one of these sub-structures would be sent off for inspection and overhaul on its own line at Chiswick. The bodies would be placed on an inverting frame and rotated to access the underside so that road debris could be removed by steam cleaning. The body would then be moved by travelling crane to one of the many parallel bays in the main shop area. The body was placed on stands with staging all around for maximum access to all parts of the body.

The overhaul would include such necessary work to return the bus to virtually "as new" condition and would be tailored to each vehicle depending on condition. For example, the body would have any damaged panels replaced or repaired, seats repaired and re-covered and any updates or modifications to the interior made. The chassis would be inspected, tested and have any service components changed or adjusted. This system of standard interchangeable components meant that when the chassis was ready to be rebuilt into a bus, the first available engine, transmission and body that had been 'outshopped' would be fitted.

Although many bus bodies were reunited with their original chassis upon completion of the overhaul, this was not always the case as the huge degree of standardisation meant that there was considerable flexibly available to match any suitable body to any suitable chassis. Whether the original, pre-overhaul combination was retained or not, what was almost always the case was that the overhauled bus would leave the works with a completely different identity - see the paragraphs below on the 'works float'. In the case of the Routemaster, there was no separate chassis in any case, just a pair of sub-frames bolted to the body and to which the running units were attached.

Once a chassis and a body were reunited, the completed vehicle would be test run around the factory site, which would include a brake test. Providing all was well mechanically, the bus would pass through the paint shop for a new coat of paint and varnish and would be fitted with a new identity including chassis, fleet and registration numbers, newly-covered seats and would then pass to the licensing shop for re-certification and then out to the receiving garage to return to service.

This modular system meant that buses could be overhauled in a shorter time than it would take if each bus was attended to on an individual basis. It was this attention and thoroughness that was largely responsible for buses such as the RT, RF and AEC Routemaster lasting so long.

One of the unusual aspects of the London Transport overhaul process was the "works float" system used for the large classes of buses such as RT, RTL, RTW, RF and Routemaster types. This dated back to the start of bus mass overhauls (then on an annual basis for each bus) by the London General Omnibus Co upon the opening of its Chiswick Works in the 1920s. In order to achieve greater efficiency of the use of the Road Fund licences for the huge bus fleet, the identity of each individual bus entering the works for overhaul was passed across to another (overhauled) bus leaving the works on the same day and the licence disc was also transferred across accordingly. The incoming bus therefore lost its identity and would not assume another, different one until it left the works some time later, then taking the identity in turn of another incoming bus. As each overhaul cycle started, the first incoming batch gave up their identities completely and these registrations were delicensed, sometimes for many years, until the final batch of buses from that overhaul cycle left the works, taking those initial identities which were now relicensed.

No legislation has ever been traced that gave either the LGOC or London Transport the authority to transfer vehicle identities and tax-discs at its discretion within its vast fleets, but it was a well-established practice for some 60 years and, given that the operator had its own licensing department at Aldenham, it is assumed that either the Ministry of Transport or the London County Council, later the Greater London Council, as the licensing authority, granted the appropriate derogation. Although the chassis (or sub-frames in the case of Routemaster) were renumbered at each overhaul so as to maintain a match with the official log-book for a particular registration number, London Transport kept its own internal records for each chassis by means of a separate, less easily visible, chassis unit number ('CU' number) which remained with the chassis for life. Bus bodies similarly had numbers which were retained for life. The works float system ceased in the mid-1980s when the practice of body separation at overhaul was finally abandoned.

The smaller classes (RLH, GS types, for example) were not subject to this mass overhaul process and retained their original identities throughout. After the end of Routemaster production, later 'off-the-peg' buses such as the Daimler Fleetlines were less suited to this style of overhaul, due either to the impracticability or the impossibility of separating body from chassis. These vehicles would be overhauled without separating the body from the chassis - indeed, many of them did not last long enough in London Transport service to receive overhauls at all. Overhauls of vehicles of these types were therefore carried with the vehicle in "built up" form, and LT had to set aside a separate area of the Works for this type of work, away from the "normal" work. Lifting jacks to raise vehicles were installed to enable access beneath. This type of overhaul resulted in the bus being off the road for weeks or even months, and was a very inefficient use of vehicle fleets.

In 1970, London Transport's Country Area buses were transferred to the state-owned National Bus Company (NBC) as London Country Bus Services. This eventually resulted in a reduction of the workload of Aldenham, with London Country establishing its own overhaul facility at Tinsley Green near Crawley. With NBC in control, its vehicle purchases were in any event off-the-peg buses that replaced the former London Transport types.

Aldenham was also used to prepare new buses for service, and they would be delivered to the works for preparation. Major accident repairs would also take place at Aldenham if the local garage could not handle the work in question. Typical of this would be the replacement of a top deck lost in collisions with a low bridge.

Staff at Aldenham were transported in by bus, with buses running from over 40 London bus garages every day. The fleet included redundant RTs and later used ex-British Airways front entrance RMA vehicles.

=== Decline and closure ===
The improving quality of bus body construction standards lead to a steady increase in the period between full overhauls; the annual overhauls of pre-WW2 became three-yearly after the War and eventually increased to every 5 and then 7 years. That factor, together with increased financial pressures in the bus industry, led to a significant decline in the need for an overhaul works of the standard of Aldenham. London Transport's Bus Works Restructuring Programme 1983-4 was followed in October 1985 by the decision to discontinue the practice of completely overhauling each bus every five years. Aldenham became increasingly uneconomic due to a shrinking bus fleet and the arrival of numerous types of non-standard vehicles not suited to full overhauls. The works became a "white elephant" resulting in the inevitable closure in November 1986. Indeed, by this time, the very existence of London Transport as a bus operator was under review, with private sector operation under competitive tender eroding its domination.

Bus overhaul was moved to Chiswick Works on a much smaller scale, then taken over by a short-lived private company called Bus Engineering Ltd (BEL).

The site was acquired by property developer Slough Estates and stood mostly empty except for occasional storage of cars on the vast site until being demolished in July 1996 to make way for the Centennial Park Business Park.

Aldenham was an ambitious project, designed to cope with maintenance of a massive bus fleet and geared to the concept of frequent, comprehensive overhauls - something that dated back to the early days of London's motor buses when the Metropolitan Police (the regulator of the time) required that each wooden-framed bus body be rebuilt every year. Even in its early days. Aldenham never worked to its full capacity (part of the works site was eventually leased to British Leyland as a repair and spares storage centre). The Aldenham Overhauls resulted in a bus that was almost back to as-new condition, something that eventually became an expensive and unnecessary luxury. Whilst the cessation of Aldenham overhauls and the transfer of maintenance work to individual bus garages initially resulted in a rather shabby bus fleet, not helped by lack of money and the upheaval in London Transport prior to privatisation of the bus services, subsequent improvements in bus construction standards - London buses are now designed for a 15-year service life with one mid-life heavy overhaul - and the use of specialist contractors to carry out non-garage maintenance have meant the London buses have long since re-assumed a smart appearance and mechanical efficiency.

== Films ==
Aldenham was the subject of several films including a 1957 British Transport film, entitled "Overhaul", about the work taking place at Aldenham. In 1962, the opening ten-minute scenes of Cliff Richard's musical film Summer Holiday were filmed during the summer shutdown at the Aldenham Works. Real depot employees were the extras who help Cliff and his friends (who are all supposed to be mechanics at the works) convert an old RT bus into a mobile home. The scenes are set to the track Seven Days to a Holiday. One shot even shows Cliff onboard an RT bus as its moved though the works by overhead crane.

The last film of the derelict works took place in 1992 for the BBC series Perpetual Motion which featured the story of the AEC Routemaster and widely on the changes at London Transport. The episode featured excerpts from "Overhaul", and later repeated the shots this time of the derelict works with the original voice over dubbed onto the footage.
