= King's Cross =

King's Cross or Kings Cross may refer to:

== London ==
- King's Cross, London, an area of central London, England
  - King's Cross (building), the memorial to George IV that gave the area its name
  - London King's Cross railway station, a major London railway terminus
  - King's Cross St Pancras tube station on the London Underground
  - King's Cross Thameslink railway station, a former railway station connecting with King's Cross station and King's Cross St Pancras tube station
  - King's Cross (ward), London borough of Camden

== Other places ==
- Kingscross, Arran, North Ayrshire, see List of United Kingdom locations: Kib-Kin#Kin
- Kings Cross Iron Age fort, Whiting Bay, Arran, North Ayrshire
- King's Cross Hospital, a hospital in Dundee, Scotland
- Kings Cross, New South Wales, an area of Sydney, Australia
- Kings Cross railway station, Sydney, an underground railway station in Sydney

== Music ==
- Kings Cross (band), an Australian band
- King's X, an American rock band
- "King's Cross" (song), a Pet Shop Boys song from their 1987 album Actually

== See also ==
- King Cross, an ecclesiastical parish in Calderdale, England
