= Bushey Heath tube station =

Cancelled London Underground station

Bushey Heath
- Interactive map of Bushey Heath

General information
- Location: Bushey Heath
- Grid reference: TQ164950
- Owner: Never Opened
- Number of platforms: 4 (planned but never built)

Railway companies
- Original company: London Underground

Other information
- Coordinates: 51.64176°N 0.31924°W

Bushey Heath was a proposed, but unbuilt, London Underground station in Bushey Heath, Hertfordshire, England. The planned location of the station was at the junction of the A41 and A411 roads.

== History ==
=== Planning and construction ===
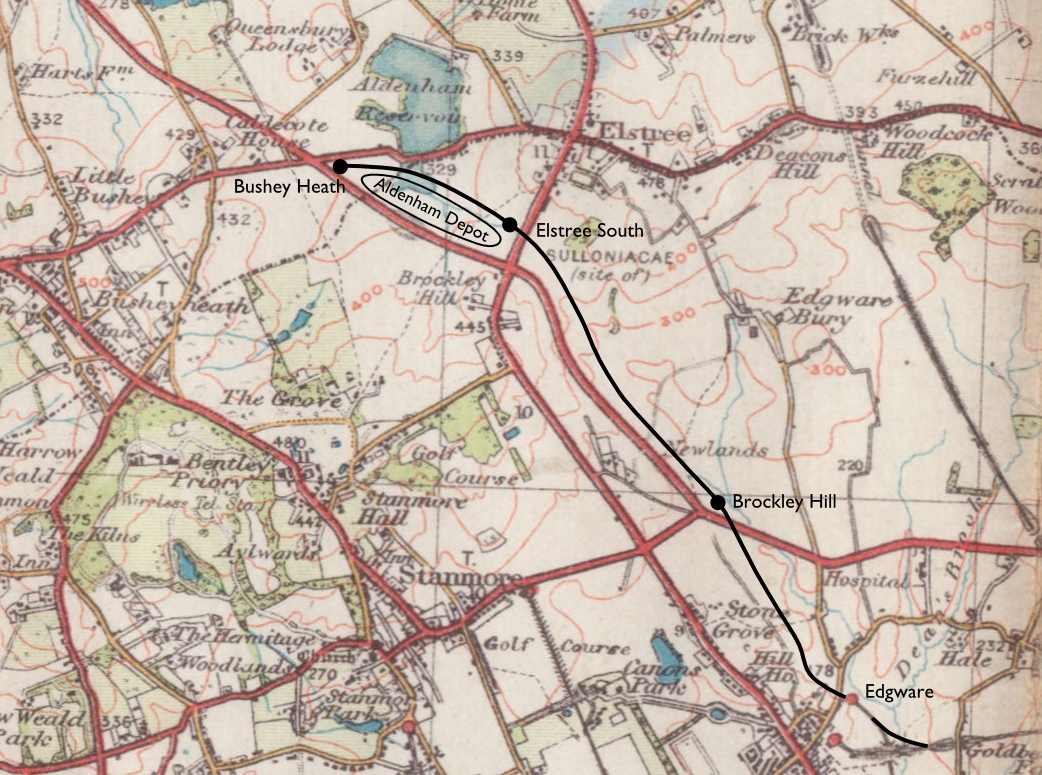
Planned route of the Bushey Heath extension superimposed on a 1934 map showing the rural nature of the area

The station was the last of three planned by London Passenger Transport Board (LPTB) in 1935 for an extension of the Northern line from Edgware. It would have served as the new terminus of the line. There was debate about the name for the station, with West Elstree, Caldecote Hill, South Aldenham, Aldenham, Bushey Heath and Aldenham and Bushey and Aldenham being proposed. (Note: A protracted series of discussions within the LPTB and with other interested parties took place during 1937 and 1938. The name used during much of planning stages was "Aldenham", linked to the nearby village (although Aldenham is further away from the proposed station site than both Elstree and Bushey Heath). The final choice of Bushey Heath was made in January 1938.) The previous station on the route would have been Elstree South to the east.

The extension was part of the Northern Heights project which was intended to electrify a number of steam-operated London and North Eastern Railway (LNER) branch lines and to incorporate them into the Northern line. Much of the land for the extension came from the purchase in 1922 by the LPTB's precursor the Underground Electric Railways Company of London of the unbuilt Watford and Edgware Railway (W&ER). The W&ER had planned an extension of the Edgware, Highgate and London Railway to Watford Junction via Bushey, but it had never raised the capital required and its powers to construct a line had expired in 1911. The specific route to Bushey Heath was approved by parliament in October 1937. The LPTB's principal purpose for the extension was to stimulate the development of new residential areas to increase passenger numbers. A secondary purpose was to provide a location suitable for a large new depot that was required to accommodate and maintain the new fleet of 1938 Stock trains to be used across the existing Northern line and the lines taken over from the LNER. (Note: The Northern line's depot at Golders Green and the Northern City line's depot at Drayton Park were poorly arranged and unsuitable for the accommodation and maintenance of the new trains. The LPTB considered constructing a new depot alongside the LNER's line between Finchley Central and Edgware, but could not negotiate a deal with the local authority for a suitable site in time to enable the depot to be built before the new rolling stock was to be delivered.) (Note: The arrangement of the depot at Aldenham located between Elstree South and Bushey Heath was intended to be similar to that between Oakwood and Cockfosters on the recently opened Piccadilly line extension.) The depot was to be constructed to the south of the running tracks between Bushey Heath and Elstree South with access from each end.

Bushey Heath station was to be located on the east side of the roundabout junction of Watford By-pass (A41) and Elstree Road (A411). The station would have had three tracks with two double-sided platforms. The arrangement placed the station entrance directly next to the roundabout preventing any later extension. The station was to be provided with a large bus station and car park. The LPTB planned to purchase the land on all four sides of the junction and proposed an extensive commercial development around the roundabout including a cinema, roadhouse and around 40 shops. As with Elstree South, the architect appointed to design the station was Charles Holden.

How Bushey Heath station may have looked on the London Underground Map if the Northern line extension from Edgware to Bushey Heath and Mill Hill East had been built

Construction work on the Northern Heights project began in the late 1930s but was suspended by the outbreak of the Second World War. Most of the work undertaken to that date had been carried out on the existing LNER branch tracks but work between Edgware and Bushey Heath had started in June 1939. The route of the line had been cleared and laid out and some earthworks and tunnelling carried out between Edgware and Elstree South.

Following the outbreak of war in Europe, work on the extension was suspended in September 1939 and was formally terminated in December of the same year as wartime funding restrictions would prevent completion. Construction of Bushey Heath station had not started when the Second World War began. During the war years, the LPTB-owned land was used for farming vegetables for staff canteens.

Work on designs for the station continued during the war to make changes required to account for Ministry of Transport plans to modify the roundabout to include an underpass. This moved the station from the east side of the roundabout to the north side with the lines running under Elstree Road. The revised arrangement would have allowed a continuation of the line beyond Bushey Heath.

=== Cancellation ===
The sites of all three new stations were in semi-rural locations and, as had happened elsewhere, it was intended that the opening of the new section of Underground line would stimulate the construction of new residential estates that the stations would then serve. After the war, however, new legislation was introduced with the intention of limiting the continuing expansion of urban areas into the surrounding countryside. This legislation created the Metropolitan Green Belt around London and the area designated included the area covered by the new Northern line extension. Without the possibility of constructing the new housing estates, the new line had no purpose and the plans for the extension were cancelled in 1950.

During the war, the depot buildings were used for the construction of Halifax bombers and the land owned by London Underground at Bushey was used for farming. After the abandonment of the extension plans, the depot buildings became Aldenham Bus Overhaul Works.

As a result of the breakup of London Transport Buses and the devolving of maintenance functions to the depots of individual bus companies, the overhaul works ceased operation in 1986. The premises stood derelict until 1997 when it was demolished and replaced with the Centennial Business Park.

Footage of the overhaul works in operation can be seen in the opening scenes of the 1963 film Summer Holiday starring Cliff Richard.

== Notes and references ==
=== Bibliography ===
- Beard, Tony (2002). By Tube Beyond Edgware. Capital Transport. ISBN 978-1-85414-246-7.
- Horne, Mike (2009) [1990]. The Northern Line, An Illustrated History (3rd ed.). Capital Transport. ISBN 978-1-85414-326-6.

Abandoned Northern Heights Extension
Preceding station	London Underground	Following station
Terminus	Northern line	Elstree South towards Morden or Kennington
