= Timeline of the London Underground =

The transport system now known as the London Underground began in 1863 with the Metropolitan Railway, the world's first underground railway. Over the next forty years, the early sub-surface lines reached out from the urban centre of the capital into the surrounding rural margins, leading to the development of new commuter suburbs. At the turn of the nineteenth century, new technology—including electric locomotives and improvements to the tunnelling shield—enabled new companies to construct a series of "tube" lines deeper underground. Initially rivals, the tube railway companies began to co-operate in advertising and through shared branding, eventually consolidating under the single ownership of the Underground Electric Railways Company of London (UERL), with lines stretching across London.

In 1933, the UK Government amalgamated the UERL and the Metropolitan Railway as a single organisation, named the London Passenger Transport Board. The London Underground has since passed through a series of administrations, expanding further by the construction of new extensions and through the acquisition of existing main line routes, culminating in its current form as part of Transport for London, the capital's current transport administration, controlled by the Greater London Authority.

This timeline lists significant dates in the history of the network. Station names shown are current names; many stations have previously had different names.

== 1820s ==
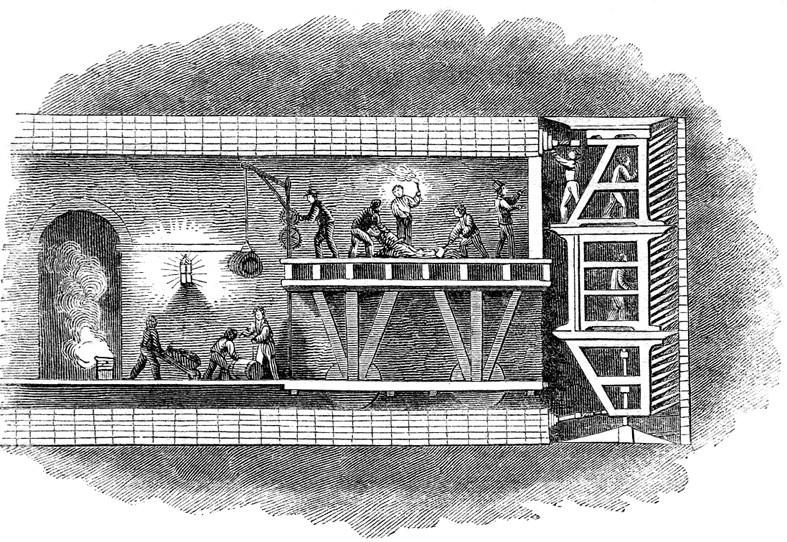
Diagram of Brunel's tunnelling shield and Thames Tunnel construction

1825
Using his patented tunnelling shield, Marc Brunel begins construction of the Thames Tunnel under the River Thames between Wapping and Rotherhithe. Progress is slow and will be halted a number of times before the tunnel is completed.

== 1840s ==
1843
The Thames Tunnel opens as a pedestrian tunnel.
1845
Charles Pearson, Solicitor to the City of London, begins promoting the idea of an underground railway to bring passenger and goods services into the centre of the city.

== 1850s ==
1854
Metropolitan Railway (MR) is incorporated and granted powers to construct an underground railway from Paddington to Farringdon.
1856
Eastern Counties Railway (ECR) opens a line from Leyton to Loughton.

== 1860s ==
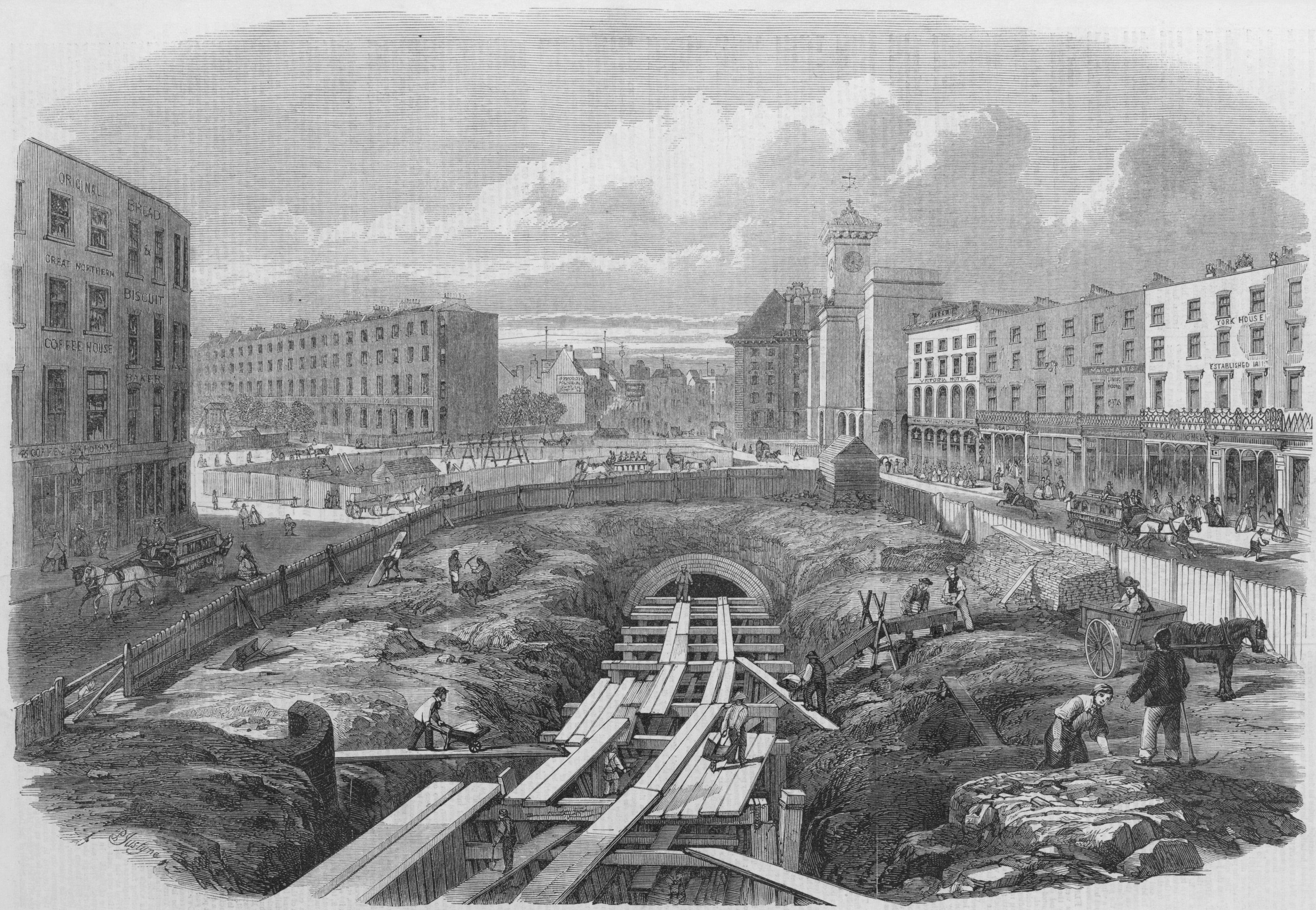
Construction of the Metropolitan Railway near King's Cross station, 1861

1860
Aylesbury and Buckingham Railway (A&BR) is incorporated.
1862
Edgware, Highgate and London Railway (EH&LR) is incorporated to build a railway between Finsbury Park and Edgware.
1863
MR opens the first underground railway in the world.
1864
MR opens the Hammersmith & City Railway, its first extensions to Hammersmith and to Kensington Olympia.
District Railway (DR) is incorporated.
North Western and Charing Cross Railway (NW&CCR) granted powers to construct an underground line from Euston to Charing Cross.
1865
MR extends to Moorgate.
East London Railway (ELR) purchases the Thames Tunnel for conversion to a railway tunnel.
ECR extends to Ongar.
1867
EH&LR opens between Finsbury Park and Edgware.
1868
MR opens the Metropolitan and St John's Wood Railway, a short branch northward from Baker Street to Swiss Cottage, the first section of the company's eventual extensions into Middlesex, Hertfordshire and Buckinghamshire.
DR opens between South Kensington and Westminster. The MR extends to connect to the DR at South Kensington and both companies operate services over the other's tracks.
A&BR opens between Aylesbury and Verney Junction.
1869
DR extends from Gloucester Road to West Brompton.
ELR opens between New Cross Gate and Wapping. First use of Thames Tunnel for trains.
London and South Western Railway (L&SWR) opens line from West London Line to Richmond.
NW&CCR plans are abandoned.

== 1870s ==
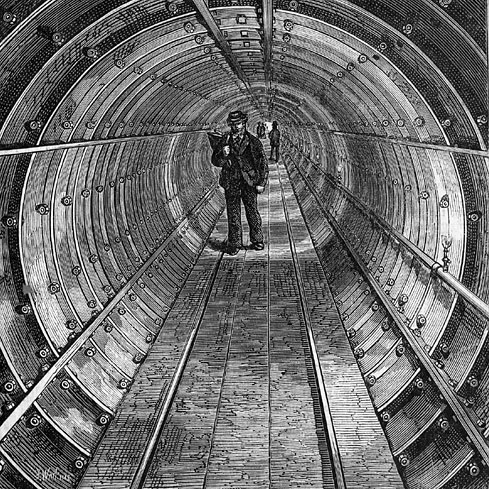
Tower Subway, showing tubular construction with segmental cast-iron rings, 1870

1870
Tower Subway opens, briefly, using a cabled-hauled carriage before conversion to pedestrian use. Constructed using a circular tunnelling shield developed by Peter W. Barlow and James Henry Greathead and lined with segmental cast-iron rings, this short tunnel under the River Thames successfully demonstrated new tunnelling techniques that would be used to construct most of the subsequent underground lines in London.
DR extends from Westminster to Blackfriars.
1871
DR extends from Blackfriars to Mansion House.
Euston, St Pancras and Charing Cross Railway revives NW&CCR's plans for an underground line from Euston to Charing Cross and changes its name to London Central Railway (LCR).
Brill Tramway opens between the A&BR's station at Quainton Road and Wood Siding.
1872
Brill Tramway extends to Brill.
DR extends from Earl's Court to Kensington Olympia.
Great Northern Railway (GNR) extends E&HLR from East Finchley to High Barnet.
1873
GNR extends EH&LR from Highgate to Alexandra Palace.
1874
DR extends from Earl's Court to Hammersmith.
City of London financiers establish Metropolitan Inner Circle Completion Railway to complete the Inner Circle by linking the DR's terminus at Mansion House with the MR's planned terminus at Aldgate.
LCR plans are abandoned.
1875
MR extends to Liverpool Street.
1876
MR extends to Aldgate.
ELR extends from Whitechapel to Shoreditch.
1877
DR extends from Hammersmith to connect to the L&SWR at Ravenscourt Park. DR and MR commence services over the L&SWR to Richmond.
1879
MR extends to Willesden Green.
MR takes over Metropolitan Inner Circle Completion Railway.
DR extends from Turnham Green to Ealing Broadway.

== 1880s ==
1880
MR extends to Harrow on the Hill.
DR extends from West Brompton to Putney Bridge.
ELR opens a spur to New Cross (South Eastern Railway)
1882
MR extends from Aldgate to Tower of London.
1883
DR commences a service over Great Western Railway (GWR) via Slough to Windsor & Eton Central.
DR extends from Acton Town to Hounslow Town.
1884
City of London and Southwark Subway (CL&SS) established to build a railway from the City of London to Elephant & Castle.
DR extends from Osterley & Spring Grove to Hounslow West.
MR and DR connect Mansion House with Tower of London, completing the Inner Circle.
MR and DR extend east to St Mary's (Whitechapel Road) and connect to ELR with services running to New Cross and New Cross Gate.
DR extends to Whitechapel.
1885
MR extends to Pinner.
DR withdraws Ealing Broadway to Windsor & Eton Central service.
1886
DR closes Hounslow Town spur.
1887
MR extends to Rickmansworth.
1889
MR extends to Chesham.
DR connects to L&SWR at East Putney and commences services to Wimbledon.

== 1890s ==
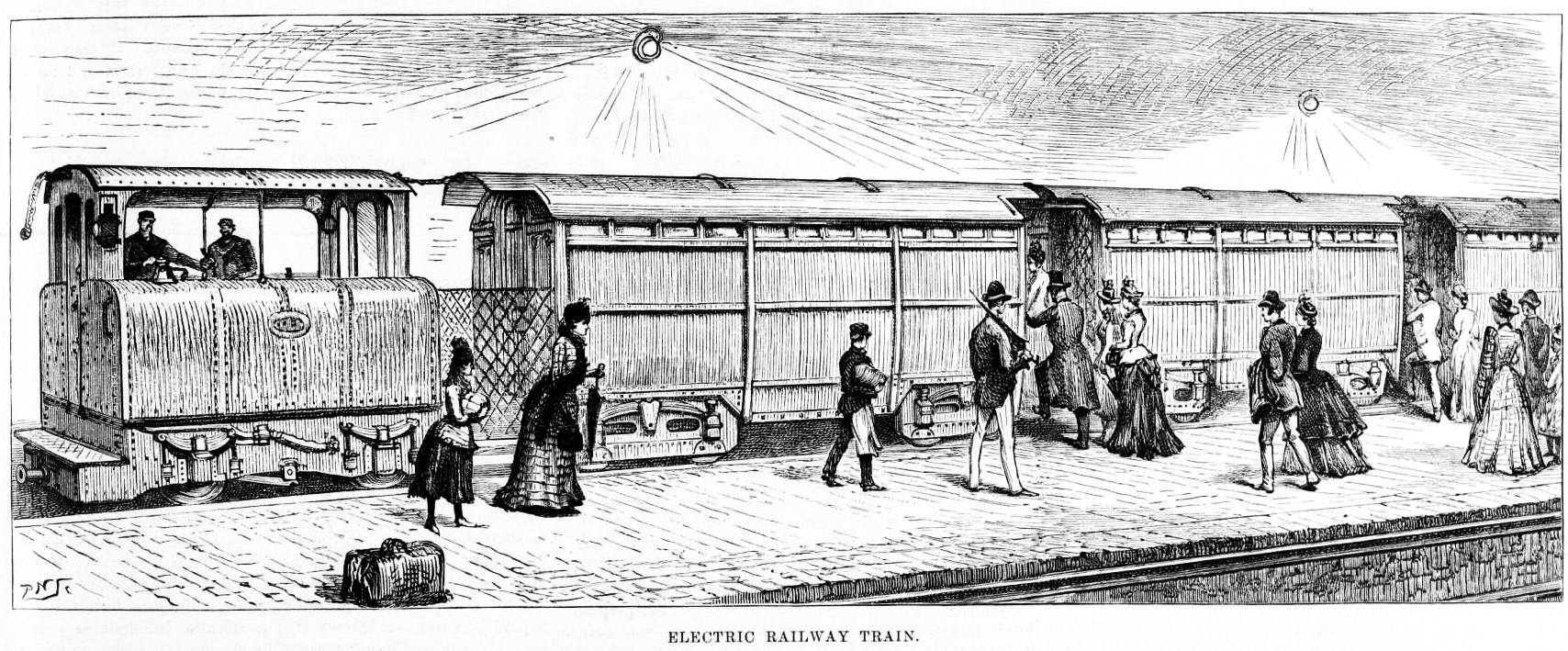
City and South London Railway electric locomotive and carriages, 1890

1890
CL&SS changes name to City and South London Railway (C&SLR), and opens between Stockwell and King William Street, the world's first deep-level underground and electric railway.
Central London Railway (CLR) incorporated to build a tube railway from Bank to Shepherd's Bush.
1891
MR takes over A&BR between Aylesbury and Verney Junction.
1892
MR extends from Chalfont & Latimer to Aylesbury.
Great Northern & City Railway (GN&CR) granted powers to build a tube railway from Finsbury Park to Moorgate.
1893
Charing Cross, Euston and Hampstead Railway (CCE&HR) granted powers to build a tube railway from Strand to Hampstead.
Baker Street and Waterloo Railway (BS&WR) granted powers to build a tube railway from Waterloo to Baker Street.
1897
Brompton and Piccadilly Circus Railway (B&PCR) granted powers to build a tube railway from Piccadilly Circus to South Kensington.
DR obtains powers to construct a tube railway from Gloucester Road to Mansion to run below its sub-surface line.
Anarchists bomb a MR train which explodes at Barbican, injuring 60 and killing one.
Whitaker Wright's London & Globe Finance Corporation purchases BS&WR.
1898
City and Brixton Railway granted powers to build a tube railway from King William Street to Brixton.
Waterloo and City Railway opens between Waterloo and Bank.
1899
Great Northern and Strand Railway (GN&SR) granted powers to build a tube railway from Wood Green to Strand.
MR services commence over the Brill Tramway.

== 1900s ==
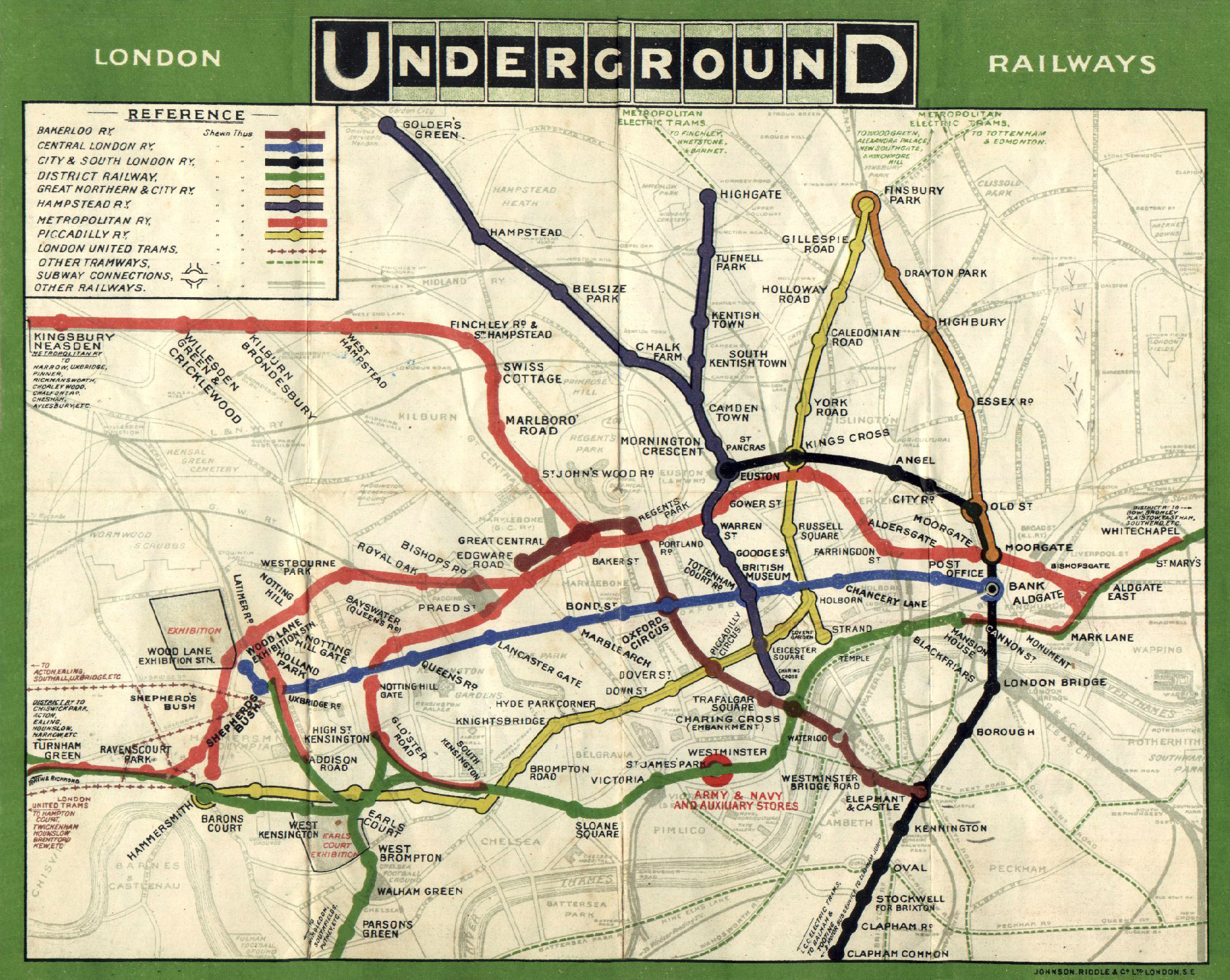
"Underground"-branded Tube map from 1908 showing the newly opened tube lines in central London

1900
C&SLR closes King William Street and extends north to Moorgate and south to Clapham Common.
CLR opens between Bank and Shepherd's Bush.
Consortium led by Charles Yerkes takes over CCE&HR.
London & Globe Finance Corporation and BS&WR collapse following Whitaker Wright's fraudulent concealment of large losses.
1901
C&SLR extends to Angel.
Yerkes consortium takes over DR, B&PCR and GN&SR and merges the tube routes to form the Great Northern, Piccadilly and Brompton Railway (GNP&BR).
1902
Yerkes consortium takes over BS&WR.
Yerkes establishes the Underground Electric Railways Company of London (UERL) as the holding company of the tube lines under his consortium's control.
DR extends from Whitechapel to Bromley-by-Bow and commences a service from there over the London, Tilbury and Southend Railway to Upminster.
Edgware & Hampstead Railway incorporated to build a railway from Golders Green to Edgware.
1903
C&SLR takes over City and Brixton Railway and allows its plans to lapse.
DR extends from Ealing Common to South Harrow.
DR reopens Hounslow Town spur.
Watford and Edgware Railway incorporated to build a railway from Edgware to Watford.
CCE&HR takes over Edgware & Hampstead Railway.
Great Eastern Railway opens Fairlop Loop from Ilford to Woodford via Hainault.
1904
GN&CR opens between Finsbury Park and Moorgate.
MR opens branch between Harrow-on-the-Hill and Uxbridge.
Whitaker Wright commits suicide by swallowing cyanide after being convicted of fraud.
1905
UERL opens Lots Road Power Station to provide electricity for the DR and the UERL's forthcoming tube lines.
MR and DR replace steam trains with electric over majority of routes.
DR withdraws service between East Ham and Upminster.
DR opens branch from Acton Town to South Acton.
DR withdraws service between St Mary's (Whitechapel Road) and New Cross.
Charles Yerkes dies and is replaced as Chairman of the UERL by Edgar Speyer.
1906
Sir George Gibb becomes Managing Director of UERL.
Frank Pick, later Managing Director and Vice Chairman of London Transport, begins work at UERL.
MR withdraws services between Hammersmith and Richmond.
BS&WR opens between Elephant & Castle and Baker Street. It becomes known as the Bakerloo tube.
GNP&BR opens between Finsbury Park and Hammersmith. It becomes known as the Piccadilly tube.
MR withdraws service between St Mary's (Whitechapel Road) and New Cross, pending electrification of the ELR.
1907
Albert Stanley, later Chairman of London Transport, begins work at UERL.
C&SLR extends to Euston.
CCE&HR opens between Golders Green, Archway and Charing Cross. It becomes known as the Hampstead tube.
Piccadilly tube opens branch from Holborn to Aldwych.
Bakerloo tube extends to Edgware Road.
1908
CLR extends to Wood Lane.
DR restarts service between East Ham and Barking.
The underground railway companies begin to use the "Underground" brand for joint marketing.
First version of the Underground roundel comes into use—a solid red disk with a bar carrying station names is based on a device used by the London General Omnibus Company.
1909
DR closes Hounslow Town spur again.

== 1910s ==
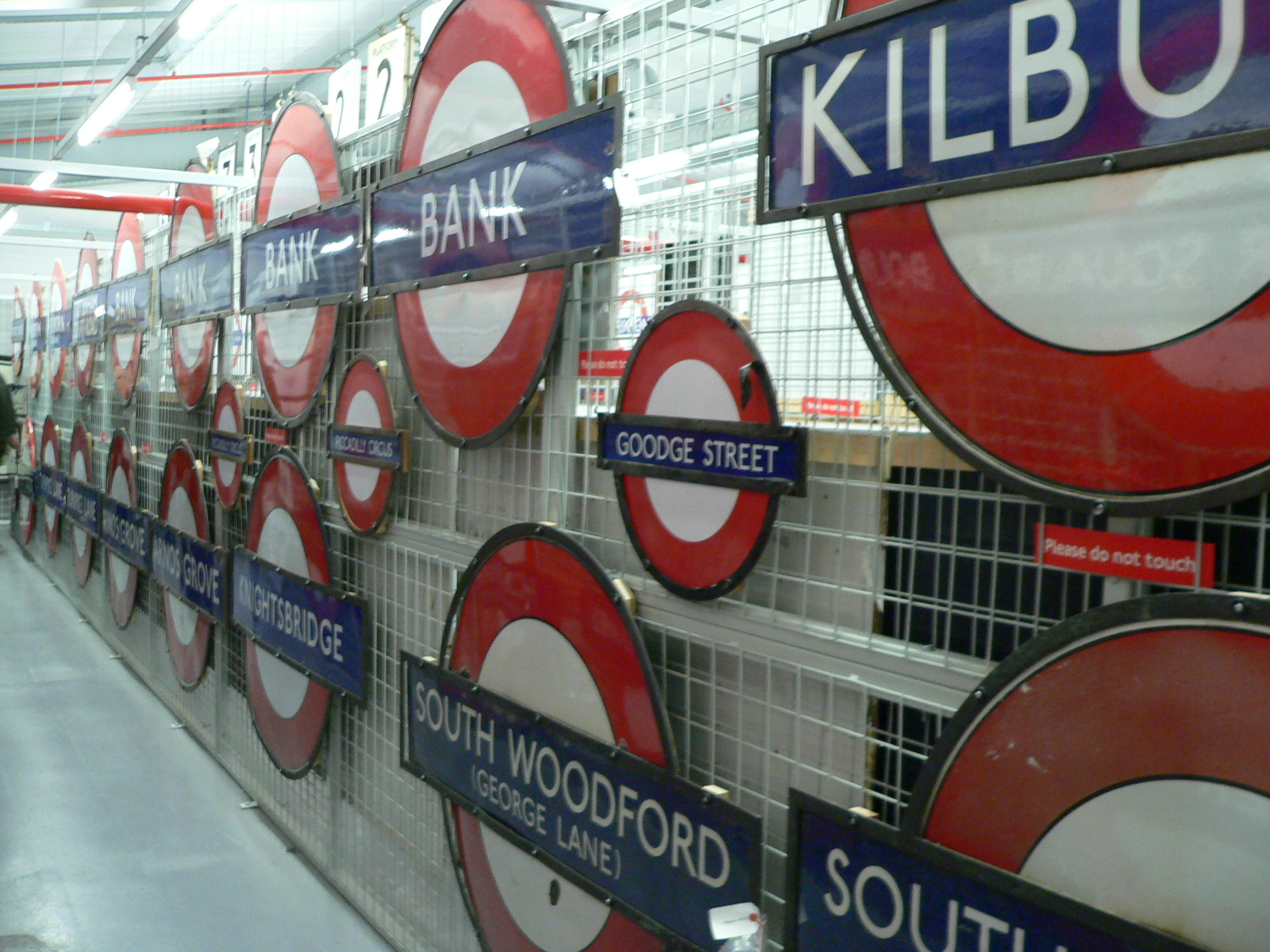
Tube roundels based on Edward Johnston's design

1910
District line extends from South Harrow to connect to the MR at Rayners Lane and commences services to Uxbridge.
District line starts excursion services from Upminster to Southend-on-Sea.
Separate managements of the Bakerloo tube, Hampstead tube and Piccadilly tube companies merge into a single company—the London Electric Railway (LER). The lines continue to be identified by individual names.
1911
First escalators come into use at Earl's Court.
1912
CLR extends to Liverpool Street.
1913
UERL purchases the C&SLR and CLR.
MR takes control of the ELR and the GN&CR.
Following electrification of the ELR, MR restarts service between St Mary's (Whitechapel Road) and New Cross. MR starts service from Whitechapel to Shoreditch and Surrey Quays to New Cross Gate.
Bakerloo tube extends to Paddington.
1914
Hampstead tube extends to Embankment.
1915
Bakerloo tube extends to Willesden Junction.
MR begins publication of Metro-land its annual guide promoting the use of its line for commuting and leisure. The name becomes synonymous with the developing suburbs north-west of the capital served by the railway.
Sir Edgar Speyer resigns as Chairman of the Underground Group following attacks in the press regarding his Germany origins. He is replaced by Lord George Hamilton.
1916
Edward Johnston designs the "Underground" typeface that now bears his name and is used by Transport for London for all transport related purposes.
1917
Edward Johnston re-designs the Underground's disk and bar roundel, to suit his new typeface, turning the disk into a ring.
1917
Bakerloo tube extends to Watford Junction.
1919
Sir Albert Stanley replaces Lord George Hamilton as Chairman of the Underground Group.

== 1920s ==
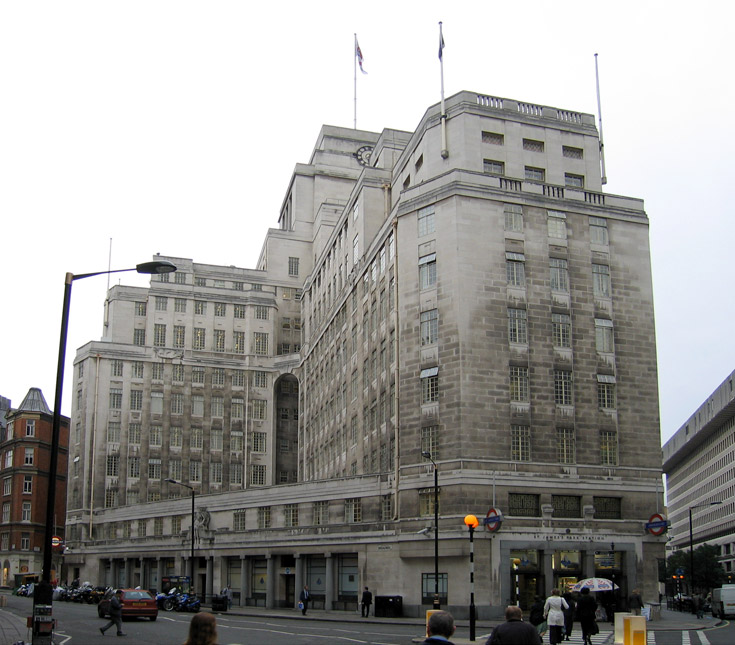
55 Broadway, built between 1927 and 1929

1920
CLR extends from Wood Lane to Ealing Broadway.
1922
Underground Group purchases unbuilt Watford and Edgware Railway to extend the Hampstead tube to Watford.
1923
Hampstead tube extends to Hendon Central.
1924
Hampstead tube extends to Edgware.
C&SLR extends from Euston to connect to Hampstead tube at Camden Town.
1925
MR extends from Moor Park to Watford.
1926
Hampstead tube links Embankment to Kennington and C&SLR extends to Morden, completing the integration of the two lines.
1929
55 Broadway opens as headquarters of the Underground Group.

== 1930s ==
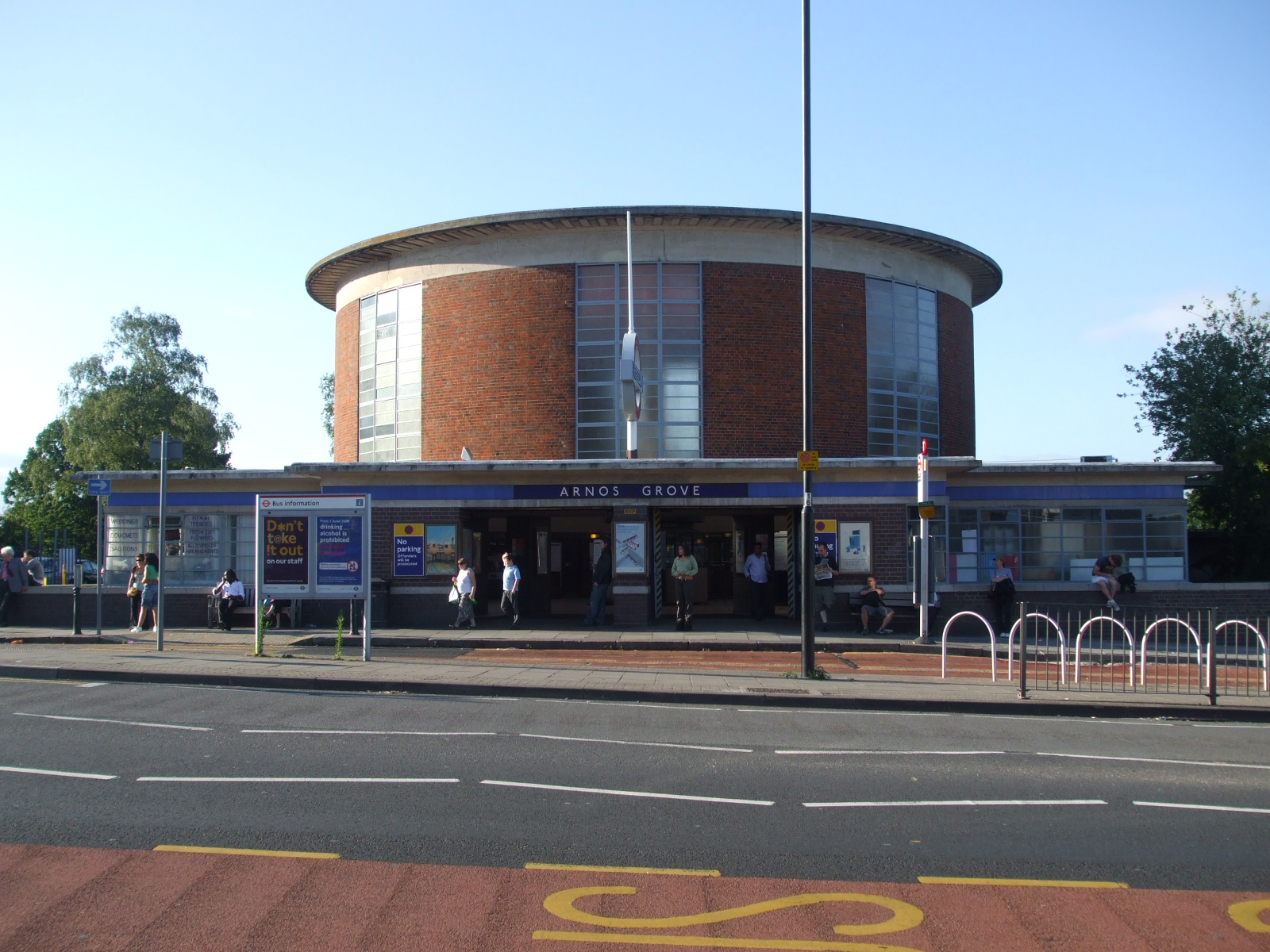
Arnos Grove station designed by Charles Holden

1932
MR extends to Stanmore.
Piccadilly line extends from Finsbury Park to Arnos Grove.
Piccadilly line extends services over District line tracks from Hammersmith to South Harrow.
District line services restart between Barking and Upminster.
MR ends publication of Metro-land.
1933
Piccadilly line extends from Arnos Grove to Cockfosters.
Piccadilly line extends services over District line tracks between Acton Town and Hounslow West and from South Harrow to Uxbridge. District line service withdrawn between Acton Town and Uxbridge.
Underground Group and MR brought under common public control with the formation of the London Passenger Transport Board (LPTB). Lord Ashfield and Frank Pick, formerly chairman and managing director of the Underground Group, become the LPTB's chairman and vice chairman.
LPTB publishes Harry Beck's first design for the Tube Map.
1935
Brill Tramway closes.
LPTB announces the New Works Programme, a five-year plan to modernise and extend the Underground network and to take over and electrify a number of main line routes.
1936
Metropolitan line closes from Aylesbury to Verney Junction.
1937
The combined Hampstead tube and C&SLR routes are officially renamed the Northern line and the CLR is renamed the Central line.
1938
Collision of two trains between Embankment and Temple owing to an incorrectly wired signal control kills six and injures 45.
1939
Bakerloo line extends from Baker Street to Finchley Road and takes over Metropolitan line services to Stanmore.
Northern line extends from Archway to East Finchley.
LPTB suspends majority of New Works Programme following outbreak of Second World War.
District line ends excursion services to Southend-on-Sea.

== 1940s ==
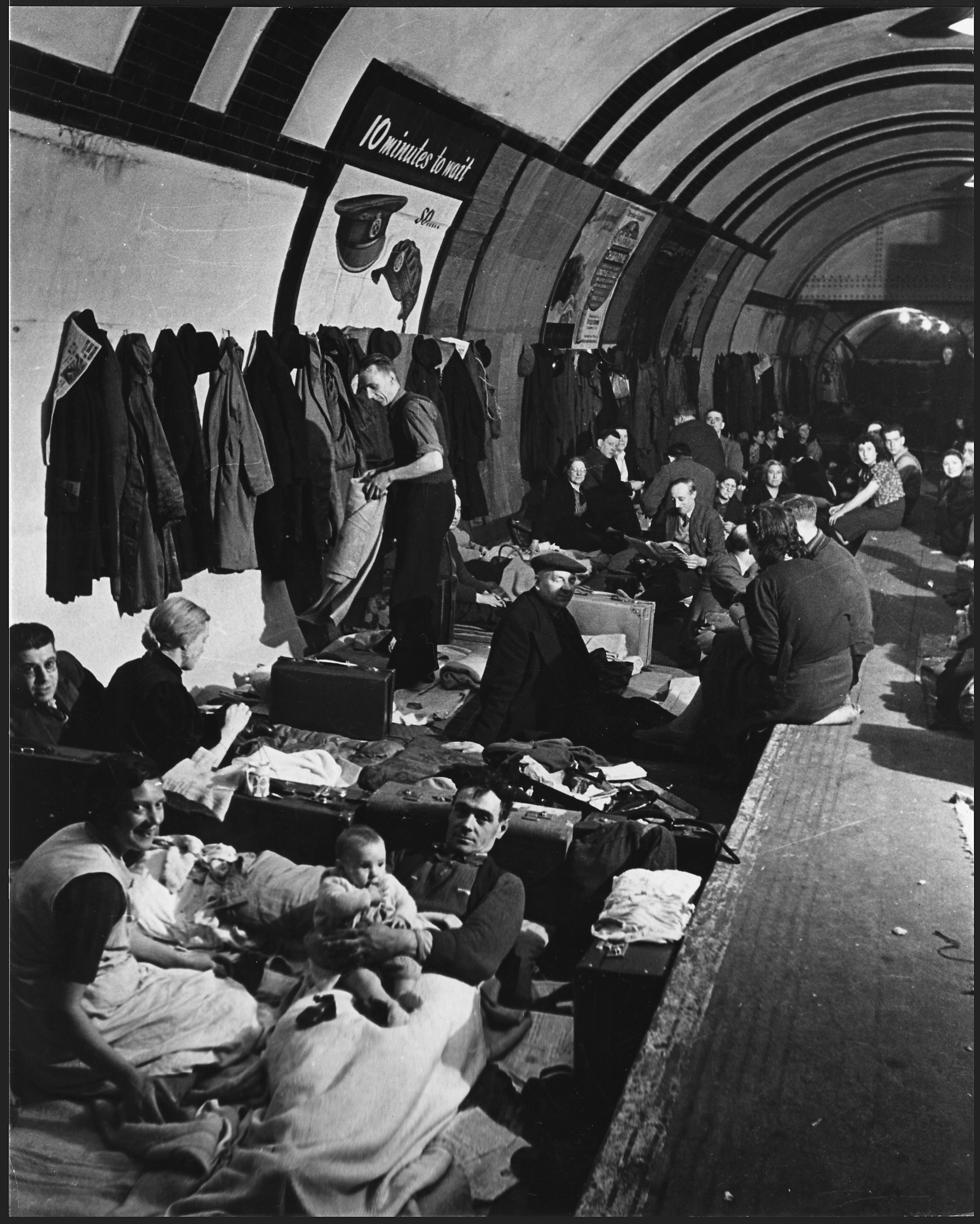
Londoners sheltering from The Blitz in a tube station

1940
Northern line extends over former EH&LR route to High Barnet.
Metropolitan line services withdrawn between Latimer Road and Kensington Olympia following bomb damage at Uxbridge Road.
Londoners use the deep tube platforms as air-raid shelters in the London Blitz. Hits by German bombs during this period kill passengers and shelterers at Charing Cross (7 killed), Bounds Green (19 killed), Balham (68 killed), Tottenham Court Road (1 killed) and Camden Town (1 killed).
Frank Pick retires from LPTB.
1941
Northern line extends over former EH&LR route to Mill Hill East.
Uncompleted new Northern line depot at Aldenham converted for the construction of Halifax bombers.
Plessey uses unopened Central line tunnels between Wanstead and Gants Hill as an underground factory.
A German bomb explodes at King's Cross St Pancras station killing two members of staff.
A German bomb explodes in the Central line ticket hall at Bank, killing 56 people.
1943
Overcrowding by members of the public entering the air-raid shelter at the unopened station at Bethnal Green causes the death of 173 people by crushing.
1946
Central line extends from Liverpool Street to Stratford.
1947
Central line extends from Stratford over former ECR and GER routes to Woodford and Newbury Park and from North Acton over GWR route to Greenford.
Lord Ashfield retires from LPTB. He is replaced by board member Lord Latham.
1948
The government nationalises all London Transport operations and the London Transport Executive (LTE) replaces LPTB. LPTB Chairman Lord Latham becomes its Chairman.
Central line extends over former ECR and GER routes to Roding Valley and Loughton and over GWR route to West Ruislip.
1949
Central line extends over former ECR route to Ongar.
Circle line appears on tube maps as a separate service for the first time.

== 1950s ==
1950
LTE abandons New Works Programme Northern line extension to Bushey Heath due to introduction of the Metropolitan Green Belt preventing development in the areas to be served.
1953
LTE abandons take-over of former EH&LR line between Mill Hill East and Edgware due to diminished expected passenger numbers and lack of funds.
A rear-end collision between two trains on the Central line between Stratford and Leyton kills 12 passengers.
Lord Latham retires as Chairman of the LTE. He is replaced by Sir John Elliot.
1955
Aldenham depot opens as bus overhaul works.
1956
Parliament grants approval for the construction of the Victoria line.
1957
Electric tube trains replace steam-hauled shuttles between Epping and Ongar.
1959
District line spur between Acton Town and South Acton is closed.
Sir John Elliot retires as Chairman of the LTE and is replaced by board member Sir Alexander Valentine.

== 1960s ==
1960
The last published underground map designed by Harry Beck is released.
Electric trains replace steam-hauled shuttles between Chalfont & Latimer and Chesham.
1961
Metropolitan line services withdrawn between Aylesbury and Amersham.
1963
London Transport Board (LTB) replaces LTE. LTE Chairman Sir Alexander Valentine continues as Chairman of the new board.
1964
District line services withdrawn between Acton Town and Hounslow West.
Northern City line services withdrawn between Drayton Park and Finsbury Park to allow the tunnels to be reused for the Victoria line.
Experimental automatic ticket gates installed at Stamford Brook, Chiswick Park and Ravenscourt Park stations.
World's first automatic trains brought into service on Central line between Hainault and Woodford to test Victoria line operating systems.
1965
Sir Alexander Valentine retires as Chairman of the LTB and is replaced by Sir Maurice Holmes.
1968
Victoria line opens between Walthamstow Central and Warren Street.
1969
Victoria line extends to Victoria.

== 1970s ==
1970
Greater London Council (GLC) takes control of management of London Underground from London Transport Board controlling the Underground through a new London Transport Executive (LTE). Sir Richard Way is Chairman of the new Executive.
1971
Victoria line extends to Brixton.
London Underground withdraws last operational steam locomotives from service.
1975
Moorgate tube crash kills 43 when a southbound Northern line (Highbury Branch) train fails to stop and crashes into the headwall of the tunnel.
Piccadilly line extends from Hounslow West to Hatton Cross.
Sir Richard Way retires as Chairman of the LTE and is replaced by Sir Kenneth Robinson.
1976
Northern line (Highbury Branch) transfers to British Rail operation.
During a bombing campaign against the Underground, an Irish Republican Army (IRA) gunman detonates a bomb on a train and kills the driver and injures a bystander while trying to escape.
1977
Piccadilly line extends from Hatton Cross to Heathrow Terminals 1, 2, 3.
1979
Jubilee line opens between Baker Street and Charing Cross and takes over Bakerloo line service to Stanmore.

== 1980s ==
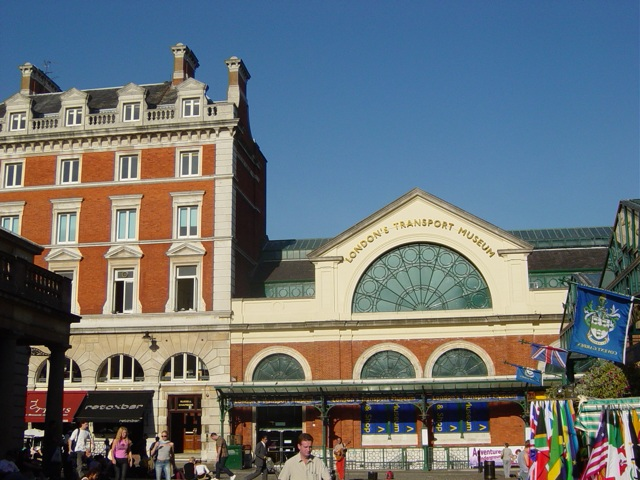
London Transport Museum, Covent Garden

1980
London Transport Museum opens in Covent Garden.
1981
GLC introduces Fares Fair policy to reduce ticket prices by increasing London Transport subsidies from local rates.
1982
Fares Fair policy ends following legal challenge from Bromley London Borough Council, which does not have any Underground services.
Bakerloo line withdraws services between Stonebridge Park and Watford Junction.
1983
LTE introduces Travelcard and divides network into five fare zones.
1984
Bakerloo line restarts services between Stonebridge Park and Harrow & Wealdstone.
Fire at Oxford Circus guts the northbound Victoria line platform and damages adjacent northbound Bakerloo line platform.
London Regional Transport (LRT) replaces LTE, removing control of transport in London from the GLC.
1985
LRT establishes its wholly owned subsidiary, London Underground Limited, to manage the Underground.
1986
Piccadilly line opens Heathrow loop and Heathrow Terminal 4.
1987
Fire at King's Cross kills 31 people when a blaze breaks out in a Piccadilly line escalator.

== 1990s ==
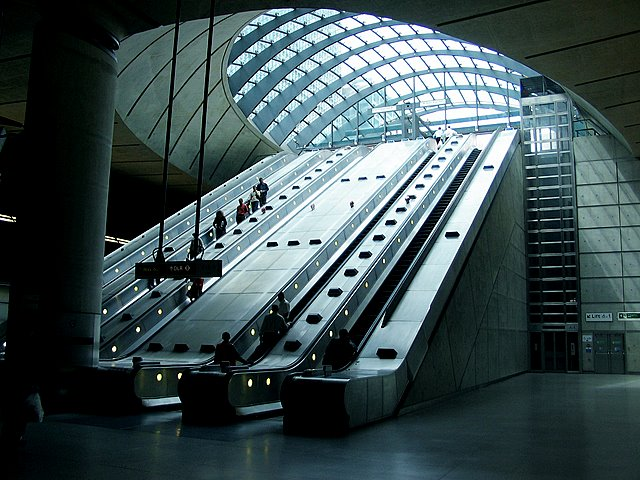
Canary Wharf station on the Jubilee line extension

1990
Hammersmith & City line appears on the Tube map independently of the Metropolitan line for the first time.
1991
Travelcard Zone 5 split to create a new Travelcard Zone 6.
1993
Construction work on the Jubilee Line Extension begins.
1994
Waterloo & City line transfers from British Rail to London Underground ownership.
Piccadilly line's Aldwych branch closes.
Central line's Epping to Ongar section closes.
1995
East London line closes for repairs to Thames Tunnel.
1998
East London line reopens.
1999
Jubilee line extends from Green Park to Stratford. The section from Green Park to Charing Cross closes.

== 2000s ==
Oyster card

2000
Last service operates with a train guard.
Transport for London (TfL), an executive body of the Greater London Authority, is established to take over responsibility for London's transport from LRT. London Underground Limited moves to direct control by the Department for Transport.
2002
Lots Road Power Station closes.
2003
TfL takes control of London Underground Limited from the Department for Transport.
Oyster card smart card ticket system begins operation.
Public Private Partnership infrastructure companies Metronet and Tube Lines take over responsibility for maintenance of underground system. Train operations remain the responsibility of TfL.
A Central line train derails at Chancery Lane when a motor falls from the underside of a carriage. Following investigations, modifications are made to all 1992 stock trains.
2005
Suicide bombers detonate bombs on three tube trains and one bus, killing 52 and injuring more than 770. Two weeks later four further bombers fail when their bombs do not explode.
2006
East London line closes from Shoreditch to Whitechapel.
2007
East London line closes completely for conversion into part of London Overground network.
Metronet goes into administration following failures to manage the costs and programmes of its projects. TfL takes over control.
2008
Piccadilly line extends to Heathrow Terminal 5.
Wood Lane station opens.
2009
Construction begins on Crossrail.
Circle line extends to Hammersmith.

== 2010s ==
2010
East London line reopens as part of London Overground network.
TfL takes over Tube Lines.
2012
London holds the 2012 Olympics and Paralympics, with record levels of Tube ridership.
2013
London Underground celebrates its 150th anniversary.
2014
Payment using Contactless bank cards begins operation.
2016
All-night Night Tube services begin operating on sections of some lines on Fridays and Saturdays.
2017
Construction begins on the Northern line extension from Kennington to Battersea Power Station.

== 2020s ==
2021
Northern line extension from Kennington to Battersea Power Station opens.
2022
TfL Rail is rebranded to Elizabeth line and the central section between Paddington and Abbey Wood station opens completing the Crossrail project after 13 years of construction.

== See also ==
- History of the London Underground
- List of London Underground stations
- List of former and unopened London Underground stations
