= List of former and unopened London Underground stations =

The London Underground is a public rapid transit system in the United Kingdom that serves a large part of Greater London and adjacent parts of the home counties of Essex, Hertfordshire and Buckinghamshire. It has many closed stations, while other stations were planned but never opened for public use. Some stations were closed down because a scarcity of passengers made them uneconomic; some became redundant after lines were re-routed or replacements were built; and others are no longer served by the Underground but remain open to National Rail main line services. Many stations were planned as parts of new lines or extensions to existing ones but were later abandoned.

Some closed station buildings are still standing, converted for other uses or abandoned, while others have been demolished and their sites redeveloped. A number of stations, while still open, have closed platforms or sections, such as the Jubilee line platforms at Charing Cross. The interiors and platforms of a few closed stations are among parts of the London Underground available for filming purposes, such as those at Aldwych.

London Transport Museum runs guided tours of several disused stations including Aldwych and Down Street through its "Hidden London" programme. The tours look at the history of the network and feature historical details drawn from the museum's own archives and collections.

== Closed and former stations ==
The following stations were once served by a London Underground line or by one of the organisation's predecessor companies, (Note: Today's London Underground is an amalgamation of a number of separate railway companies that were brought together under the common ownership of the London Passenger Transport Board (LPTB) in 1933. The current operator, Transport for London, is the latest successor of the LPTB.) but are no longer served. Many are permanently closed, but some continue to be served by National Rail main line train operators.

Station	Line	Closed	Type of closure	Current condition	Details
Aldgate East	District	30 October 1938	Station resited	Demolished	Closed when the current station was opened a short distance to the east to enable the Aldgate junction to be rebuilt
Aldwych	Piccadilly	30 September 1994	Station and route closed	Building and platform remains. The platforms are sometimes used for cinematic purposes	Terminus of Piccadilly line branch line from Holborn; closed because of low passenger numbers and cost of replacing lifts
Aylesbury	Metropolitan	10 September 1961	Service withdrawn	Operated by Chiltern National Rail	The service was cut back to Amersham when electric locomotive-hauled trains were replaced with A60 Stock trains. Now operated by Chiltern Railways
Blake Hall	Central	31 October 1981	Station closed	Building remains as private residence.	Closed due to low passenger numbers Line used as heritage railway (Epping – Ongar)
Brill	Metropolitan	30 November 1935	Station and route closed	Demolished	Closed when Brill branch was closed owing to very low passenger numbers
British Museum	Central	24 September 1933	Station closed	Demolished	Closed when Central line platforms were opened at Holborn
Brompton Road	Piccadilly	29 July 1934	Station closed	Mostly demolished, side elevation remains	Closed due to low passenger numbers and creation of a new entrance to Knightsbridge station
Bushey	Bakerloo	24 September 1982	Service withdrawn	Operated by National Rail	Former peak hours only service withdrawn to save money following cancellation of Greater London Council's Fares Fair policy; both now operated by London Overground
Carpenders Park	Bakerloo	24 September 1982	Service withdrawn	Operated by National Rail	Former peak hours only service withdrawn to save money following cancellation of Greater London Council's Fares Fair policy; both now operated by London Overground
Castle Hill (Ealing Dean)	District	30 September 1885	Service withdrawn	Operated by National Rail	The Windsor service was cut back to Ealing Broadway owing to low passenger numbers. It is now West Ealing station.
Charing Cross	Jubilee	19 November 1999	Partial	Remainder of station in use along with surviving platforms	Two platforms are still functional but were removed from public use when the Jubilee line extension to Stratford was opened in 1999.
City Road	Northern	8 August 1922	Station closed	Demolished. A modern ventilation tower and emergency escape remains.	Closed due to low passenger numbers
Down Street	Piccadilly	21 May 1932	Station closed	Building remains	Closed due to low passenger numbers when entrances to Green Park and Hyde Park Corner were moved closer to its location
Drayton Park	Northern	16 August 1976	Service withdrawn, transferred to National Rail	Operated by National Rail	Former Northern line Highbury Branch between Moorgate and Finsbury Park converted to main line operation
Earl's Court	District	31 January 1878	Station resited	Demolished	Original station closed when the current station opened to the west
Essex Road	Northern	16 August 1976	Service withdrawn, transferred to National Rail	Operated by National Rail	Former Northern line Highbury Branch between Moorgate and Finsbury Park converted to main line operation
Granborough Road	Metropolitan	4 July 1936	Station and route closed	Demolished	Closed when Verney Junction service was cut back to Aylesbury owing to low passenger numbers
Great Missenden	Metropolitan	10 September 1961	Service withdrawn	Operated by National Rail	The service was cut back to Amersham when electric locomotive-hauled trains were replaced with A60 Stock trains. Now operated by Chiltern Railways
Hammersmith (Grove Road)	Metropolitan	31 December 1906	Service withdrawn	Subsequently closed and demolished	Service withdrawn due to low passenger numbers; station was closed in 1916 by London and South Western Railway
Hanwell	District	30 September 1885	Service withdrawn	Operated by National Rail	The Windsor service was cut back to Ealing Broadway because of poor passenger numbers. Now an Elizabeth line station
Hatch End	Bakerloo	24 September 1982	Service withdrawn	Operated by National Rail	Former peak hours only service withdrawn to save money following cancellation of Greater London Council's Fares Fair policy; now operated by London Overground
Hayes	District	30 September 1885	Service withdrawn	Operated by National Rail	The Windsor service was cut back to Ealing Broadway owing to low passenger numbers. It is now Hayes & Harlington station on the Elizabeth line.
Headstone Lane	Bakerloo	24 September 1982	Service withdrawn	Operated by National Rail	Former peak hours only service withdrawn to save money following cancellation of Greater London Council's Fares Fair policy; now operated by London Overground
Hillingdon	Metropolitan, Piccadilly	5 December 1992	Station resited	Demolished	The original station was to the east of the current station and was closed to allow widening of the A40 road.
Hounslow Town	District	1 May 1909	Station and route closed, station resited	Demolished	On a now-closed branch of the District Railway, from what is now the Piccadilly line near Hounslow East, it was closed when Hounslow East station was opened.
Kings Cross	Metropolitan	9 March 1941	Station resited	Building remains	The original platforms were to the east of the current ones; the station was moved to make interchange with main line station easier.
King William Street	Northern	24 February 1900	Station and route closed	Demolished but underground platforms remain	The original terminus of the City & South London Railway, which was closed when the line was extended on a new alignment to Bank; converted for use as an air-raid shelter during World War II
Langley	District	30 September 1885	Service withdrawn	Operated by National Rail	The Windsor service was cut back to Ealing Broadway owing to low passenger numbers. Now an Elizabeth line station
Leigh-on-Sea	District	30 September 1939	Service withdrawn	Operated by National Rail	Limited excursion service withdrawn as a wartime measure and not restarted; now operated by c2c
Lord's	Metropolitan	19 November 1939	Station closed	Demolished	Closed to increase capacity on Metropolitan line, following opening of nearby St John's Wood station on the Bakerloo line (now the Jubilee line).
Mark Lane	District, Circle	4 February 1967	Station resited	Building remains	Closed when current Tower Hill station to the east was built to provide a better interchange with main line services at Fenchurch Street
Marlborough Road	Metropolitan	19 November 1939	Station closed	Building remains	Closed to increase capacity on Metropolitan line, following opening of nearby St John's Wood station on the Bakerloo line (now the Jubilee line)
New Cross	East London	22 December 2007	Service withdrawn, transferred to National Rail	Operated by National Rail	Both transferred to London Overground as part of the East London Line Extension
New Cross Gate	East London	22 December 2007	Service withdrawn, transferred to National Rail	Operated by National Rail	Both transferred to London Overground as part of the East London Line Extension
Northfields & Little Ealing	Piccadilly	18 May 1932	Station resited	Demolished	Moved to allow access into new depot at Northfields built for Piccadilly line trains; when open, this station was served by the District line.
North Weald	Central	30 September 1994	Stations and route closed	Buildings remain	Both closed due to low passenger numbers; reopened in 2004 as part of the Epping Ongar Railway.
Ongar	Central	30 September 1994	Stations and route closed	Buildings remain	Both closed due to low passenger numbers; reopened in 2004 as part of the Epping Ongar Railway.
Osterley & Spring Grove	Piccadilly	24 March 1934	Station resited	Building remains as retail unit; platforms partially remain	Closed when new Osterley station was opened to the south-west, to provide additional capacity
Park Royal & Twyford Abbey	Piccadilly	5 July 1931	Station resited	Demolished	Closed when station was relocated to Park Royal to provide more convenient access from Western Avenue; when open, this station was served by the District line.
Preston Road	Metropolitan	2 January 1932	Station resited	Demolished	A small halt station was reconstructed to the west when the number of tracks through the station was increased from two to four.
Quainton Road	Metropolitan	4 July 1936	Service withdrawn, transferred to LNER	Building remains	Service was cut back to Aylesbury owing to low passenger numbers; it temporarily reopened for wartime operations between 1943 and 1948. BR services withdrawn 1963, but the station is the home of the Buckinghamshire Railway Centre and is used for occasional special services from Aylesbury.
Rotherhithe	East London	22 December 2007	Service withdrawn, transferred to National Rail	Operated by National Rail	Transferred to London Overground as part of the East London Line Extension
St Mary's (Whitechapel Road)	District	30 April 1938	Station closed	Demolished	Closed when Aldgate East was rebuilt closer to its location; converted for use as an air-raid shelter during the war
Shadwell	East London	22 December 2007	Service withdrawn, transferred to National Rail	Operated by National Rail	Transferred to London Overground as part of the East London Line Extension
Shepherd's Bush	Hammersmith & City	31 March 1914	Station resited	Demolished	Station replaced by Shepherd's Bush (now Shepherd's Bush Market) to the north and Goldhawk Road to the south
Shoeburyness	District	30 September 1939	Service withdrawn	Operated by National Rail	Limited excursion service withdrawn as a wartime measure and not restarted; now operated by c2c
Shoreditch	East London	9 June 2006	Station re-sited and route re-aligned	Building remains	Closed to allow extension of East London Line on new alignment across site Replaced by London Overground station Shoreditch High Street.
Slough	District	30 September 1885	Service withdrawn	Operated by National Rail	The Windsor service was cut back to Ealing Broadway owing to low passenger numbers. Now operated by Great Western Railway
South Acton	District	28 February 1959	Station and route closed	Demolished. Remainder of station operated by National Rail.	On a short branch of the District line from Acton Town, it was closed owing to low passenger numbers. The remainder of the station survives, currently served by the London Overground
Southend Central	District	30 September 1939	Service withdrawn	Operated by National Rail	Limited excursion service withdrawn as a wartime measure and not restarted; now operated by c2c
Southall	District	30 September 1885	Service withdrawn	Operated by National Rail	The Windsor service was cut back to Ealing Broadway owing to low passenger numbers. Now an Elizabeth line station
South Harrow	Piccadilly	4 July 1935	Station resited	Building remains	Closed when station was relocated a short distance to the north
South Kentish Town	Northern	5 June 1924	Station closed	Building remains	Closed due to a strike at the Underground's Lots Road Power Station and never reopened owing to low passenger numbers
Stoke Mandeville	Metropolitan	10 September 1961	Service withdrawn	Operated by National Rail	The service was cut back to Amersham when electric locomotive-hauled trains were replaced with A60 Stock trains. Now operated by Chiltern Railways
Surrey Quays	East London	22 December 2007	Service withdrawn, transferred to National Rail	Operated by National Rail	Transferred to London Overground as part of the East London Line Extension
Swiss Cottage	Metropolitan	17 August 1940	Station closed	Demolished	Closed as a wartime measure and not reopened; the adjacent Bakerloo line (now Jubilee line) station briefly operated as an interchange
Tower of London	District, Circle	12 October 1884	Station resited	Demolished	A short-lived station on the site of the present Tower Hill station, which was closed when Mark Lane (also now closed) was opened
Uxbridge	Metropolitan, Piccadilly	3 December 1938	Station resited	Demolished	Closed when the current station was opened on a new alignment closer to Uxbridge town centre
Uxbridge Road	Metropolitan	19 October 1940	Station closed	Demolished	Closed after bombing of the line during World War II, with services not re-instated due to low passenger numbers; National Rail services on the line continue, and Shepherd's Bush station is a short distance to the north.
Verney Junction	Metropolitan	4 July 1936	Station and route closed	Demolished	Closed when service was cut back to Aylesbury due to low passenger numbers
Waddesdon	Metropolitan	4 July 1936	Station and route closed	Demolished	Closed when Verney Junction service was cut back to Aylesbury owing to low passenger numbers
Waddesdon Road	Metropolitan	30 November 1935	Station and route closed	Demolished	Closed when Brill branch was closed due to very low passenger numbers
Wapping	East London	22 December 2007	Service withdrawn, transferred to National Rail	Operated by National Rail	Transferred to London Overground as part of the East London Line Extension
Watford High Street	Bakerloo	24 September 1982	Service withdrawn	Operated by National Rail	Former peak hours only service withdrawn to save money following cancellation of Greater London Council's Fares Fair policy; now operated by London Overground
Watford Junction	Bakerloo	24 September 1982	Service withdrawn	Operated by National Rail	Former peak hours only service withdrawn to save money following cancellation of Greater London Council's Fares Fair policy; now operated by London Northwestern Railway
Wendover	Metropolitan	10 September 1961	Service withdrawn	Operated by National Rail	The service was cut back to Amersham when electric locomotive-hauled trains were replaced with A60 Stock trains. Now operated by Chiltern Railways
Westbourne Park	Metropolitan	31 October 1871	Station resited	Demolished	Closed when the current station was opened in 1871
Westcott	Metropolitan	30 November 1935	Station and route closed	Building remains	Closed when Brill branch was closed due to very low passenger numbers
West Drayton	District	30 September 1885	Service withdrawn	Operated by National Rail	The Windsor service was cut back to Ealing Broadway owing to low passenger numbers. Now an Elizabeth line station
Windsor	District	30 September 1885	Service withdrawn	Operated by National Rail	The Windsor service was cut back to Ealing Broadway owing to low passenger numbers. The station is now Windsor & Eton Central.
Winslow Road	Metropolitan	4 July 1936	Station and route closed	Demolished	Closed when Verney Junction service was cut back to Aylesbury owing to low passenger numbers
White City	Hammersmith & City	24 October 1959	Station closed	Demolished	This station closed following a fire, which destroyed one of the platforms. Wood Lane station, which opened in 2008, is close to its location.
Wood Lane	Central	22 November 1947	Station resited	Demolished	This awkwardly arranged station was closed when its replacement, White City, opened to the north.
Wood Siding	Metropolitan	30 November 1935	Station and route closed	Demolished	Both closed when Brill branch was closed because of very low passenger numbers
Wotton	Metropolitan	30 November 1935	Station and route closed	Demolished	Both closed when Brill branch was closed because of very low passenger numbers
York Road	Piccadilly	17 September 1932	Station closed	Building remains	Closed owing to low passenger numbers

== Unopened stations ==
The following stations were once planned by the London Underground or one of the early independent underground railway companies and were granted parliamentary approval. Subsequent changes of plans or shortages of funds led to these stations being cancelled before they opened, and, in most cases, before any construction work was carried out. (Note: In addition to the stations listed, which received parliamentary approval, there have been many unapproved proposals for new underground railways and unapproved alternative plans for underground railways already opened. The unapproved stations included in such proposals are too numerous to list.)

Station	Line	Planned	Cancelled	Proposal	Details
Aldwych	Fleet	1971	1989	Expansion of existing station on new route	Part of the cancelled phase 2 of the original Fleet (now Jubilee) line plans
Alexandra Palace	Northern	1935	1954	Transfer of mainline station and route	Abandoned part of Northern Heights Project. Transfer from LNER.
Beckton	Jubilee	1980	1989	New station on new route	Part of the cancelled revised phase 3 of the Jubilee line plans, revived previous mainline route closed in 1940
Brixton	City & Brixton Railway	1898	1902	New station on new route	Company failed to raise funds and permissions expired
Brockley Hill	Northern	1936	1953	New station on new route	Partly built; an abandoned part of Northern Heights Project
Brondesbury	North West London Railway	1899	1908	New station on new route	Company failed to raise funds and permissions expired
Bushey Heath	Northern	1936	1949	New station on new route	Abandoned part of Northern Heights Project.
Camberwell	Bakerloo	1931	1950	New station on new route	Part of abandoned extension to Camberwell
Cannon Hill	District	1910	1923	New station on new route	Unbuilt station on the Wimbledon & Sutton Railway replaced by Wimbledon Chase when the line was built
Cannon Street	Fleet	1971	1989	Expansion of existing station on new route	Part of the cancelled phase 2 of the original Fleet (now Jubilee) line plans
Charing Cross	London Central Railway	1871	1874	New station on new route	Station would have been on the north side of Strand opposite the main line station
Charing Cross	District	1897	1908	New station on new route	The only intermediate station on a cancelled deep-level express route running under the south side of the Circle line from Gloucester Road to Mansion House, it would have had an interchange with the MDR's sub-surface station (now Embankment).
Cheam	District	1910	1923	New station on new route	Unbuilt station on the Wimbledon & Sutton Railway
Clerkenwell	Metropolitan Railway	1911	1932	New station on existing route	Unbuilt station on the Metropolitan Railway
Collingwood Road	District	1910	1922	New station on new route	Unbuilt station on the Wimbledon & Sutton Railway
Cranley Gardens	Northern	1935	1954	Transfer of mainline station and route	Abandoned part of Northern Heights Project. Transfer from LNER.
Cricklewood	North West London Railway	1899	1908	New station on new route	Company failed to raise funds and permissions expired
Crouch End	Northern	1935	1954	Transfer of mainline station and route	Abandoned part of Northern Heights Project. Transfer from LNER.
Custom House	Jubilee	1980	1989	Transfer of mainline station and route	Part of the cancelled revised phase 3 of the Jubilee line plans
Denham	Central	1937	1948	New service to existing station	Cancelled part of Central line extension beyond West Ruislip, due to the introduction of Metropolitan Green Belt; National Rail services continue
Elm Farm	District	1910	1922	New station on new route	Unbuilt station on the Wimbledon & Sutton Railway
Elm Grove	District	1910	1922	New station on new route	Unbuilt station on the Wimbledon & Sutton Railway
Elstree South	Northern	1936	1949	New station on new route	Abandoned part of Northern Heights Project.
Emlyn Road	Central	1913	1919	New station on new route	Abandoned proposal for an extension to Richmond
Fenchurch Street	Fleet	1971	1989	New station on new route	Part of the cancelled phase 2 of the original Fleet (now Jubilee) line plans
Finchley Road	Metropolitan & St John's Wood Railway	1864	1870	New station on new route	A continuation of the line from Swiss Cottage
Goodge Street	London Central Railway	1871	1874	New station on new route	Station would have been further west on Goodge Street to the west of the Northern line's station of the same name opened later
Gower Street	London Central Railway	1871	1874	New station on new route	Interchange station that would have connected to the Metropolitan Railway's station of the same name (now Euston Square)
Hammersmith	Central	1919	1920s	New station on new route	Abandoned proposal for an extension to Richmond, on an alternative route from the 1913 plan
Hampstead	Metropolitan & St John's Wood Railway	1865	1870	New station on new route	An extension from Finchley Road to Hampstead
Harefield Road	Central	1937	1948	New station on existing route	Cancelled part of Central line extension beyond West Ruislip, due to introduction of Metropolitan Green Belt
Harringay	Great Northern & Strand Railway	1898	1902	New station on new route	Part of a section of the Great Northern & Strand Railway running beneath the Great Northern Railway north of Finsbury Park, which was cancelled when the line was merged with the Brompton & Piccadilly Circus Railway (now the Piccadilly line); it would have had an interchange with the GNR's Harringay station.
Harrow Road	North West London Railway	1899	1908	New station on new route	Company failed to raise funds and permissions expired
Heathfield Terrace	Central	1913	1919	New station on new route	Abandoned proposal for an extension to Richmond
Highgate (High-level)	Northern	1935	1954	Transfer of mainline station and route	Abandoned part of Northern Heights Project. Transfer from LNER. LNER station rebuilt but transfer cancelled; the deep-level station built to interchange with the original high-level station remains in use.
Hornsey	Great Northern & Strand Railway	1898	1902	New station on new route	Part of a section of the Great Northern & Strand Railway running beneath the Great Northern Railway north of Finsbury Park; cancelled when the line was merged with the Brompton & Piccadilly Circus Railway (now the Piccadilly line); it would have had an interchange with the GNR's Hornsey station.
Hyde Park Corner	North West London Railway	1899	1908	New station on new route	A connection was planned to Piccadilly line station.
Kennington Cross	City & Brixton Railway	1898	1902	New station on new route	Company failed to raise funds and permissions expired
Kilburn	North West London Railway	1899	1908	New station on new route	Company failed to raise funds and permissions expired; a separate station to the Jubilee line station of the same name
Lambeth Road	City & Brixton Railway	1898	1902	New station on new route	Company failed to raise funds and permissions expired
Leicester Square	London Central Railway	1871	1874	New station on new route	Station would have been on the north side of Leicester Square west of the Northern line's and Piccadilly line's station of the same name opened later
Lewisham	Fleet	1972	1989	Expansion of existing station on new route	Part of the cancelled phase 3 of the original Fleet (now Jubilee) line plans
London Bridge	City & Brixton Railway	1898	1902	New station on new route	Company failed to raise funds and permissions expired; a separate station to the Northern line station of the same name
Lorn Road	City & Brixton Railway	1898	1902	New station on new route	Company failed to raise funds and permissions expired
Lothbury	Great Northern & City Railway	1902	1914	New station on new route	Superseded by an alternative plan that did not need the station, but which was also cancelled
Ludgate Circus	Fleet	1971	1989	New station on new route	Part of the cancelled phase 2 of the original Fleet (now Jubilee) line plans
Maida Vale	North West London Railway	1899	1908	New station on new route	Company failed to raise funds and permissions expired; a separate station to the Bakerloo line station of the same name, which was planned later.
Mansion House	District	1897	1908	New station on new route	The terminus of a cancelled deep-level express route running under the south side of the Circle line from Gloucester Road, it would have had an interchange with the MDR's sub-surface station.
Marble Arch	North West London Railway	1899	1908	New station on new route	Company failed to raise funds and permissions expired; a connection was planned to the Central line station.
Merton Park	District	1910	1923	New station on new route	Station on the Wimbledon & Sutton Railway, later opened by the Southern Railway as South Merton
Mill Hill (The Hale)	Northern	1935	1954	Transfer of mainline station and route	Abandoned part of Northern Heights Project. Transfer from LNER.
Millwall	Jubilee	1980	1989	New station on new route	Part of the cancelled revised phase 3 of the Jubilee line plans
Muswell Hill	Northern	1935	1954	Transfer of mainline station and route	Abandoned part of Northern Heights Project. Transfer from LNER.
New Cross	Fleet	1971	1989	Expansion of existing station on new route	Part of the cancelled phase 3 of the original Fleet (now Jubilee) line plans
New Cross Gate	Fleet	1971	1989	Expansion of existing station on new route	Part of the cancelled phase 3 of the original Fleet (now Jubilee) line plans
North End	Northern	1903	1906	New station on new route	Planned by the Charing Cross, Euston and Hampstead Railway, but abandoned, partly built at platform level, because of anticipated low passenger numbers; the line opened through the station as planned in 1907.
North Greenwich	Jubilee	1980	1989	New station on new route	Part of the cancelled revised phase 3 of the Jubilee line plans
Oxford Street	London Central Railway	1871	1874	New station on new route	Station would have been on Oxford Street west of the junction with Tottenham Court Road
Paddenswick Road	Central	1913	1919	New station on new route	Abandoned proposal for an extension to Richmond
Rylett Road	Central	1913	1919	New station on new route	Abandoned proposal for an extension to Richmond
St George's Circus	City & Brixton Railway	1898	1902	New station on new route	Company failed to raise funds and permissions expired
St Katharine Docks	Jubilee	1980	1989	New station on new route	Part of the cancelled revised phase 3 of the Jubilee line plans
Silvertown	Jubilee	1980	1989	Transfer of mainline station and route	Part of the cancelled revised phase 3 of the Jubilee line plans
South Morden	District	1910	1923	New station on new route	Unbuilt station on the Wimbledon & Sutton Railway replaced by Morden South and St Helier when the line was built
Stroud Green	Northern	1935	1954	Transfer of mainline station and route	Abandoned part of Northern Heights Project. Transfer from LNER.
Surrey Docks	Fleet	1971	1989	Expansion of existing station on new route	Part of the cancelled phase 3 of the original Fleet (now Jubilee) line plans
Surrey Docks North	Jubilee	1980	1989	New station on new route	Part of the cancelled revised phase 3 of the Jubilee line plans
Sutton	District	1910	1923	New service to existing station	London, Brighton & South Coast Railway station to which the Wimbledon & Sutton Railway planned to extend
Sutton Common	District	1910	1923	New station on new route	Station on the Wimbledon & Sutton Railway, later opened by the Southern Railway
The Grove	Central	1913	1919	New station on new route	Abandoned proposal for an extension to Richmond
Trafalgar Square	Charing Cross and Waterloo Electric Railway	1882	1885	New station on new route	Abandoned proposal for line from Charing Cross to Waterloo, the first proposed to use electric traction
Turnham Green	Central	1913	1919	New station on new route	Abandoned proposal for an extension to Richmond
Victoria	North West London Railway	1899	1908	New station on new route	Company failed to raise funds and permissions expired; a connection was planned to the District line station.
Walthamstow Wood Street	Victoria	1955	1961	New station on new route	Original planned terminus of line before plans were modified to omit the last station and terminate at Walthamstow Central
Walworth	Bakerloo	1931	1950	New station on new route	Part of abandoned extension to Camberwell
Wapping	Jubilee	1980	1989	Expansion of existing station on new route	Part of the cancelled revised phase 3 of the Jubilee line plans
Waterloo	Charing Cross and Waterloo Electric Railway	1882	1885	New station on new route	Abandoned proposal for line from Charing Cross to Waterloo, the first proposed to use electric traction
Waterloo	Piccadilly	1965	1967	Expansion of existing station on new route	Abandoned proposal for an extension of line from Aldwych
Watford Central	Metropolitan	1927		New station on new route	Part of abandoned Metropolitan line extension to Watford town centre
West End	North West London Railway	1899	1908	New station on new route	Company failed to raise funds and permissions expired
Wood Green	Great Northern & Strand Railway	1898	1902	New station on new route	Part of a section of the Great Northern & Strand Railway running beneath the Great Northern Railway north of Finsbury Park; cancelled when line was merged with the Brompton & Piccadilly Circus Railway (now the Piccadilly line); would have had an interchange with the GNR's Wood Green station (now Alexandra Palace)
Woolwich Arsenal	Jubilee	1980	1989	Expansion of existing station on new route	Part of the cancelled revised phase 3 of the Jubilee line plans

== See also ==
- List of London Underground stations – includes previous names for stations
- List of closed railway stations in London
- List of closed railway stations in Britain
- List of fictional rapid transit stations
- List of London Underground-related fiction
- Ghost stations of other cities:
  - Ghost stations of the Paris Métro
  - Ghost stations of Berlin
  - Disused Barcelona Metro stations
  - List of closed New York City Subway stations
