= Oxford Street tube station =

Oxford Street tube station may refer to one of the following stations:

- Oxford Street (LCR) tube station, an unopened station on the planned but unbuilt London Central Railway.
- Tottenham Court Road tube station, the Charing Cross, Euston and Hampstead Railway (now the Northern line) part of this station was named Oxford Street when opened in 1907 but renamed in 1908.
- Oxford Circus tube station, a London Underground station on the Bakerloo, Central and Victoria lines.
