= Planned London Underground stations =

Planned London Underground stations may mean stations on the London Underground that have been:

- Planned to open in the future
- Planned in the past and cancelled
