= Edgware Road Tube schemes =

Underground railway proposals

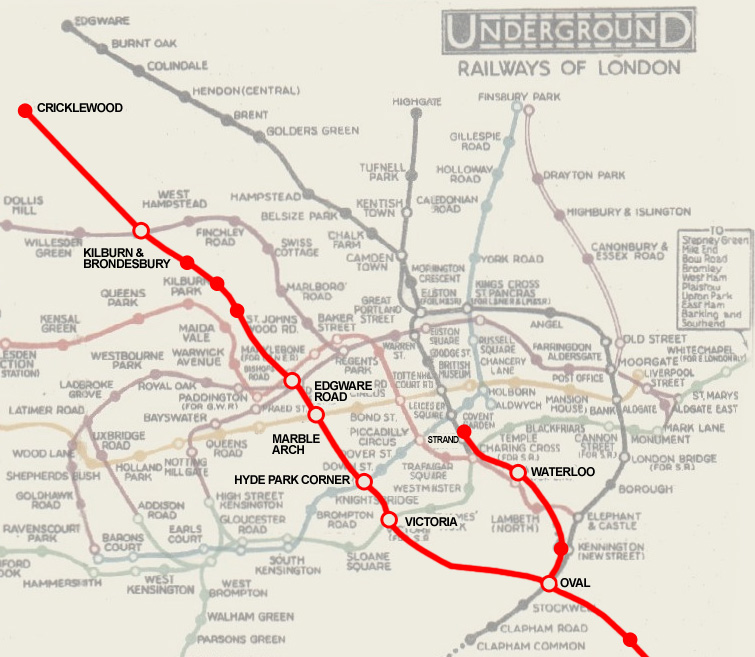
Route of the proposed Kearney tube, one of several unrealised Tube plans for the Edgware Road

There were a number of proposals to build an underground railway along the Edgware Road in north-west London, England, at the end of the 19th century. Each scheme envisaged building some form of rail tunnel under Edgware Road towards Victoria railway station.

These proposals were made at a time of intensive railway construction, following projects such as City and South London Railway. Like several other proposals at the time, such as the City and Brixton Railway, none of the Edgware Road schemes came to fruition.

== Edgware Road and Victoria Railway ==
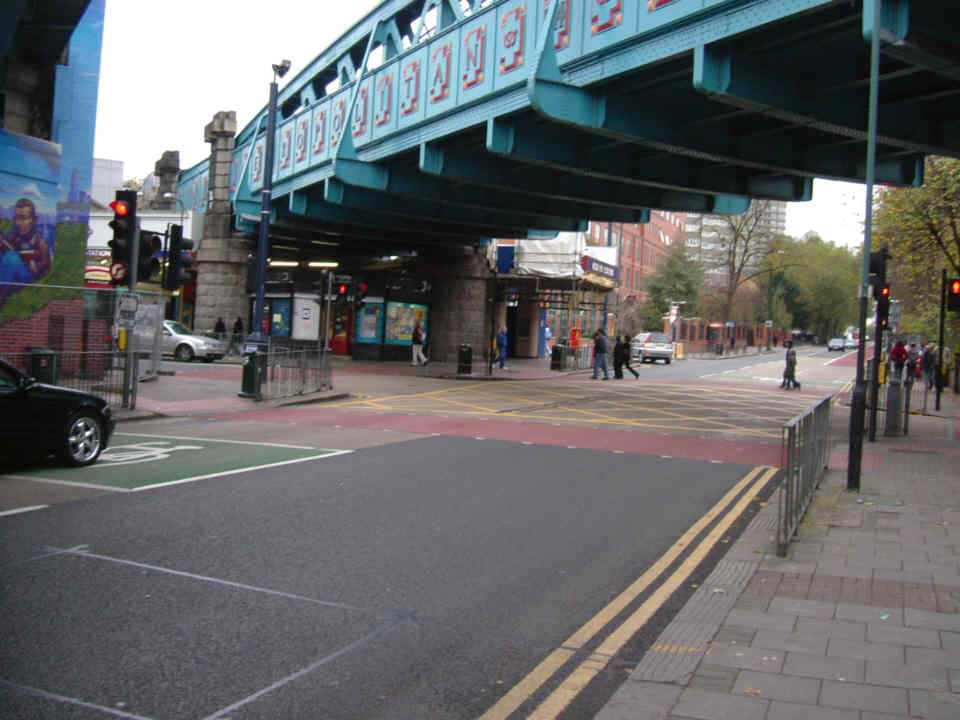
The Edgware Road (pictured here at Shoot Up Hill, Kilburn) was traversed by the Metropolitan Railway and the LNWR, but plans were drawn up to drive a tube under the length of the road

The Edgware Road and Victoria Railway (ER&VR) was an early scheme for an underground railway under the Edgware Road. The promoters sought to raise capital of £1.2 million (£133 million today) to cover the estimated railway construction costs of £920,000 and the cost of constructing a dedicated power station for the railway at the Paddington Basin.

The ER&VR was planned to run on a north-west-to-south-east axis, more or less following the route of the Edgware Road. Beginning in the north, a surface-level depot was planned near the location of the present-day Brondesbury Park. Trains were to run into a tunnel to the first station. Passing south-east, the stations planned were:

- Brondesbury
- Kilburn (close to Kilburn High Road)
- Hall Road (close to Maida Vale)
- Praed Street (close to Edgware Road)
- Marble Arch
- Hyde Park Corner
- London Victoria

A bill to allow the project to go ahead was considered by the House of Commons Select committee in March 1893. A number of petitions were made to the committee by property owners along the proposed route of the ER&VR, concerned by the construction of a tube railway under their properties. The construction of the City and South London Railway (C&SLR, part of today's Northern line) had given rise to a number of problems, such as building subsidence on top of brick-built station tunnels. As the C&SLR was the first deep-level tube railway to be built, there were still concerns about construction and ventilation issues with this type of tunnel. To address these concerns, the route of the railway tunnel was moved slightly west between Marble Arch and Victoria so it would run under Hyde Park and avoid the affluent properties of Park Lane.

Despite this, the committee was still not confident about the proposal to build another tube tunnel under London, and the bill was rejected.

== Cricklewood, Kilburn and Victoria Railway ==
In 1898, the Cricklewood, Kilburn and Victoria Railway Construction Syndicate was incorporated to promote a similar project to the failed ER&VR. Like the North West London Railway (NWLR), the railway would have followed the Edgware Road route beginning further north at Cricklewood. The company was defeated by the passing of the NWLR's bill and the syndicate was dissolved in 1901.

== North West London Railway ==
North West London Railway Act 1899
- Act of Parliament
- Parliament of the United Kingdom
- Long title: An Act for incorporating the North West London Railway Company and for empowering them to construct underground railways from Marble Arch to Cricklewood and for other purposes.
- Citation: 62 & 63 Vict. c. cclxi

Dates
- Royal assent: 9 August 1899

The proposal to build a railway under the Edgware Road was revived in 1899 when a group of engineers began to promote the North West London Railway (NWLR). The railway would have followed a similar route to the ill-fated ER&VR, but was to begin further north at Cricklewood and would only run as far as Marble Arch. Its promoters included Sir Benjamin Baker, Sir Douglas Fox and Sir Francis Fox, and they had £1.5 million capital and sought to borrow a further £500,000. Although the bill to grant construction powers passed successfully through Parliament in 1899 as the North West London Railway Act 1899, there were difficulties raising the necessary funds. The only proven tube railway at the time, the C&SLR, was not delivering a great return on investment, and investors were hesitant. The outbreak of the Second Boer War in 1899 destabilised the money markets and construction on the NWLR project never commenced.

North West London Railway Act 1902
- Act of Parliament
- Parliament of the United Kingdom
- Long title: An Act to extend the time for the compulsory purchase of lands for and completion of the railways and works authorised by the North West London Railway Act 1899 and for other purposes.
- Citation: 2 Edw. 7. c. cclviii

Dates
- Royal assent: 18 November 1902

Text of statute as originally enacted

North West London Railway Act 1906
- Act of Parliament
- Parliament of the United Kingdom
- Long title: An Act for empowering the North West London Railway Company to extend their authorised railways and for other purposes.
- Citation: 6 Edw. 7. c. cxciv

Dates
- Royal assent: 4 August 1906

In 1902, the scheme was allowed an extension of time to begin construction by the North West London Railway Act 1902 (2 Edw. 7. c. cclviii), and an increase in tunnel size from 12' 6" to 13' 0". The next year a bill was presented proposing an extension to Victoria Station, under Hyde Park and Grosvenor Place. However the bill was withdrawn following its postponement due to the Royal Commission on London Traffic. It was to transpire that the commissions' only recommended new 'tube' would be an extension of the North West London from Marble Arch to Victoria. In 1906, the NWLR reintroduced its Victoria extension along with a reduction in tunnel size to 11' 8¼", receiving royal assent in August as the North West London Railway Act 1906 (6 Edw. 7. c. cxciv). However the financial conditions imposed on the bill made the extension unattractive.

== Baker Street and Waterloo Railway ==
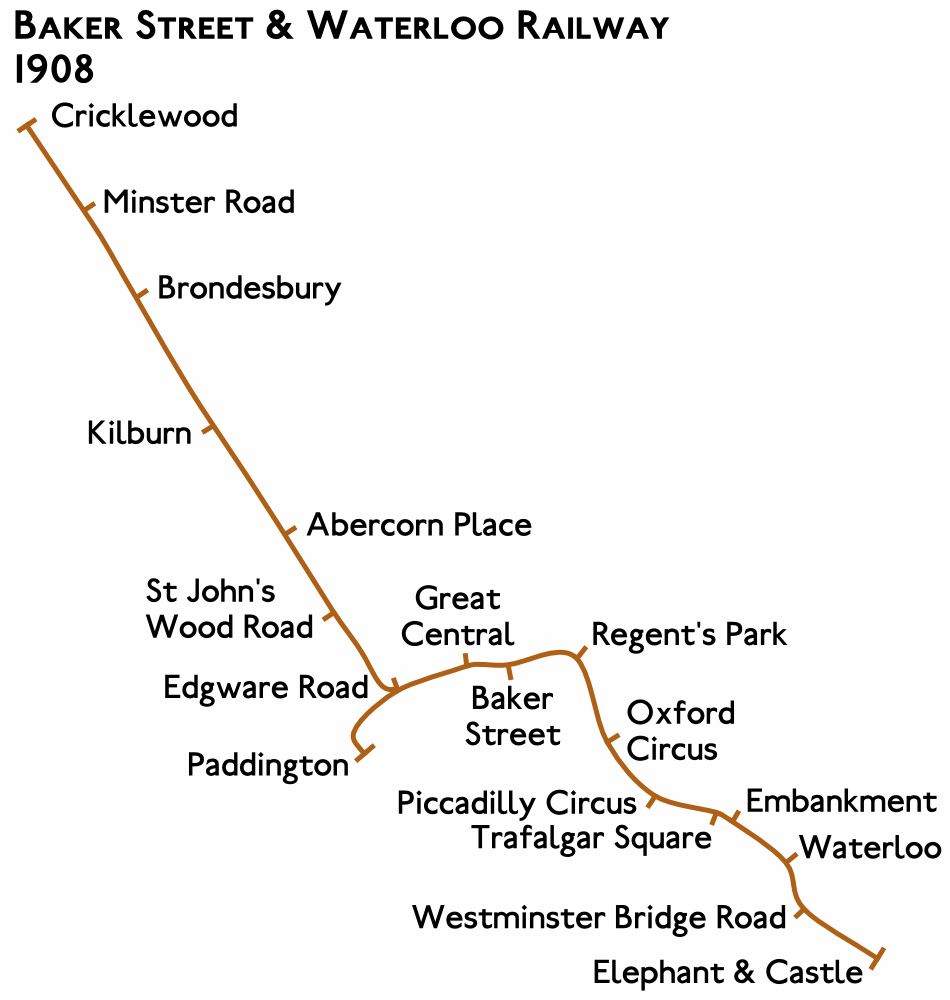
Rejected route proposed in 1908

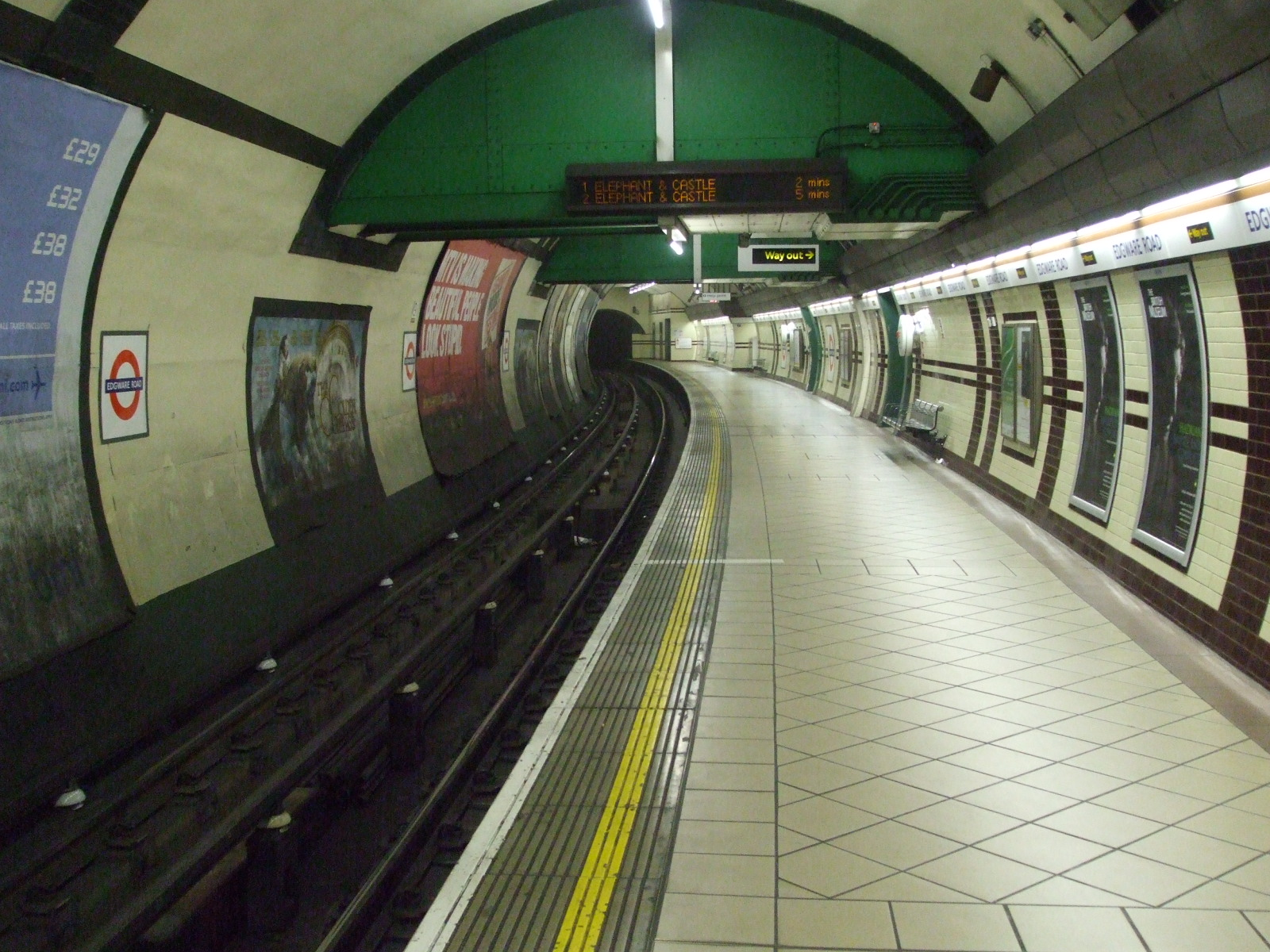
The Edgware Road station on the Bakerloo Tube (now the Bakerloo line)

When the NWLR's tube project became financially unviable, the company's plans were adopted in 1908 by a more successful underground railway company, the Baker Street and Waterloo Railway (BS&WR). The BS&WR had already opened an underground line in 1906 from Baker Street to Waterloo and Elephant and Castle (the "Bakerloo" Tube), and had already extended its line to Edgware Road. The company was keen to extend further into north-west London and hoped to make use of the powers acquired by the (NWLR) to build the Edgware Road tube line.

Abandoning the Marble Arch-Victoria section of the NWLR route, the BS&WR instead proposed building the Edgware Road tube line only as far south as its Edgware Road station, which was close to the NWLR's planned route. The NWLR announced a bill in November 1908 seeking to construct a 757 metres (2,484 ft) connection between its unbuilt route beneath the Edgware Road and the Bakerloo Tube's Edgware Road station. The Bakerloo Tube was to construct the extension and operate the service over the combined route, which was to have stations at St John's Wood Road, Abercorn Place, Belsize Road, (close to the LNWR station), Brondesbury (to interchange with the North London Railway's station and close to the MR's Kilburn station), Minster Road and Cricklewood. The Bakerloo Tube announced its own bill to make the necessary changes to its existing plans.

At the same time, the BS&WR also had aspirations to extend its services to Paddington. The company planned to make the Edgware Road route it main service, with a shuttle line running from Edgware Road to Paddington. Two additional platforms were planned at Edgware Road tube station for shuttle use.

The BS&WR/NWLR joint scheme faced opposition from other railway companies; the Great Western Railway (GWR) objected to the reduction of the Bakerloo Tube's Paddington connection to a shuttle; and the Metropolitan Railway (MR) objected to the connection of the two lines which would be in competition with its line through Kilburn. Parliament rejected the proposed connection and the changes to the NWLR's route, and the company's permissions eventually expired without any construction work being carried out. The Bakerloo Tube bill was withdrawn. This was to be the first bill promoted by the NWLR that did not receive royal assent.

== Kearney High-Speed Tubes ==
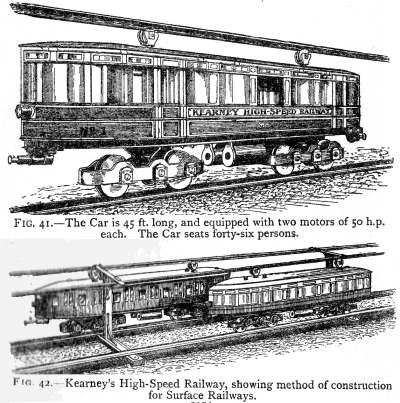
Sketches published in 1915 of Kearney's underground monorail system

In 1905–08, the Australian-born engineer Elfric Wells Chalmers Kearney put forward a plan to build two tube lines from Crystal Palace to Strand and Cricklewood.

The scheme was promoted by the Kearney High-Speed Tube Railway Company Ltd. and proposed the construction of an underground railway operated on an unusual monorail system patented by Kearney. Trains would run on a single rail with four double-flanged wheels under each carriage; wheels mounted on the roof would run along an upper guide rail above the train. The trains, which were to be designed in a streamlined style similar to the London Underground 1935 Stock, would have a low centre of gravity, which, along with the gyroscopic effect of motion, would stabilise the train on the lower rail and reduce the side-to-side hunting oscillation.

The stations were to be located just below the surface, connected by deep-level tube tunnels which would drop down steeply from each station; it was intended that the 1 in 7 track incline would enhance acceleration and deceleration between stations with the effects of gravity, with trains reaching 60 miles per hour (97 km/h) before decelerating. This "roller coaster" system was promoted for its low power consumption.

Kearney promoted his system by publishing leaflets, writing a book, giving lectures and he displayed a model of a Kearney train in 1905 for the press.

The proposed route comprised two lines across London: one aligned along the Edgware Road route from Cricklewood via Victoria to Oval; and another from Strand to Crystal Palace, connecting with the Cricklewood line at Oval:

Main route

- Crystal Palace
- Herne Hill
- East Brixton
- North Brixton
- Oval
- Vauxhall
- Pimlico (not to be confused with the current station)
- Victoria
- Hyde Park Corner
- Marble Arch
- Edgware Road
- Lord's (separate; not to be confused with the Metropolitan station)
- Carlton Hill
- Quex Road
- Brondesbury
- Cricklewood

Branch from Oval

- Kennington
- Waterloo
- Strand (later Aldwych)

The Kearney Tube system was promoted in other unsuccessful schemes around the world, including New York City, Boston and Toronto.

== Metropolitan Railway ==
A 1925 plan for a relief line from Kilburn & Brondesbury to Edgware Road to relieve the tunnels between Finchley Road and Baker Street

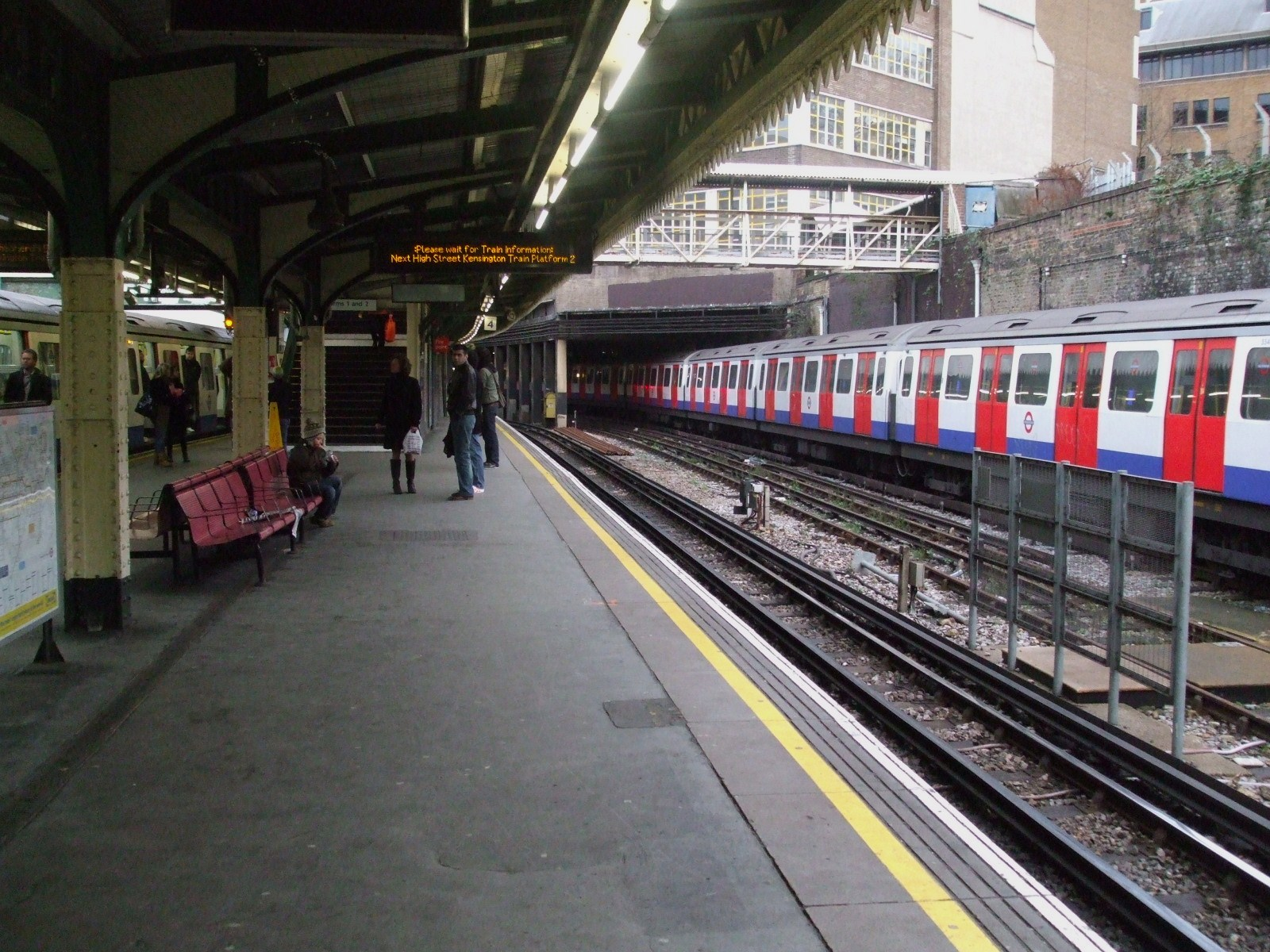
The Metropolitan Railway's Edgware Road station

By the 1920s the Metropolitan Railway (MR) had expanded its lines deep into the countryside of Buckinghamshire and Hertfordshire, successfully promoting its commuter services with the Metro-land advertising campaign. A high volume of traffic was running through its lines into central London via Baker Street and a bottleneck had developed at Finchley Road where the fast and slow tracks converged into one pair.

In 1925, the MR drew up plans to construct a relief line by digging new twin-bore tube tunnels under the Edgware Road, large enough to accommodate Met rolling stock. At a proposed junction north of Kilburn & Brondesbury station, Metropolitan trains would run down a tunnel into the extension line and run beneath Kilburn High Street, Maida Vale and Edgware Road; the line would then rise up to join the Inner Circle just to the west of Edgware Road Met station, and trains would continue to Baker Street. The plan included three new stations, at Quex Road, Kilburn Park Road and Clifton Road.

In preparation for this new line, Edgware Road Met station was rebuilt with four platforms and was equipped with platform indicators which could display 'Aylesbury Line' and destinations such as Verney Junction and Uxbridge. However, the scheme was halted after new safety requirements were issued by the Ministry of Transport — deep-level tube trains were now required to have an emergency exit at each end and the compartment stock used by the MR north of Harrow did not comply with this requirement.

The capacity problem was later addressed after the MR had been taken over by the London Passenger Transport Board (LPTB). In 1936 the LPTB constructed a new tunnel to link the Metropolitan line to the Bakerloo line, enabling local Met services to be taken over by the Bakerloo line (later becoming the Jubilee line) and relieving congestion on the Inner Circle line.

== See also ==
- Bakerloo line extension to Camberwell - abandoned projects to extend the Bakerloo line in South London
- London Buses route 16 - a London bus route which follows the path of many of the proposed lines
