= Euston Square tube station =

London Underground station

Euston Square
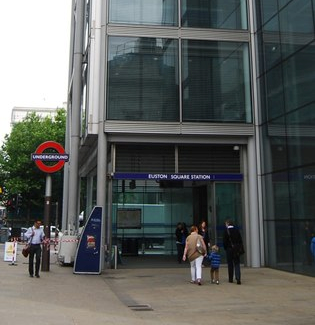
- Southern entrance on Gower Street
- Interactive map of Euston Square

General information
- Location: Euston Road
- Local authority: London Borough of Camden
- Managed by: London Underground
- Number of platforms: 2
- Accessible: Yes (Westbound only)
- Fare zone: 1
- OSI: Euston; Euston; Warren Street

London Underground annual entry and exit
- 2021: ▲5.26 million
- 2022: ▲10.33 million
- 2023: ▲11.24 million
- 2024: ▲11.75 million
- 2025: ▲12.19 million

Key dates
- 10 January 1863: Opened as Gower Street
- 1 November 1909: Renamed Euston Square

Other information
- External links: TfL station info page
- Coordinates: 51.5258°N 0.1358°W

Euston Square (/ˈjuːstən ˈskwɛər/) is a London Underground station, located at the corner of Euston Road and Gower Street, just north of University College London (UCL) – its main (south) entrance faces the tower of University College Hospital (UCH). The multi-interchange Euston station is beyond Euston Square Gardens, which is situated 250 m (270 yards) east from this station on Euston Road.

Euston Square is on the Circle, Hammersmith & City and Metropolitan lines, between Great Portland Street and King's Cross St Pancras stations. It is in London fare zone 1.

== History ==
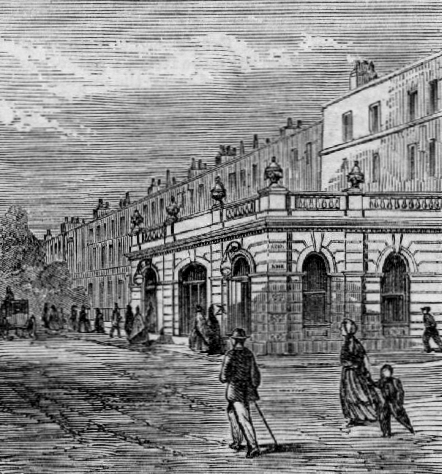
The original southern entrance building on Euston Road, 1862

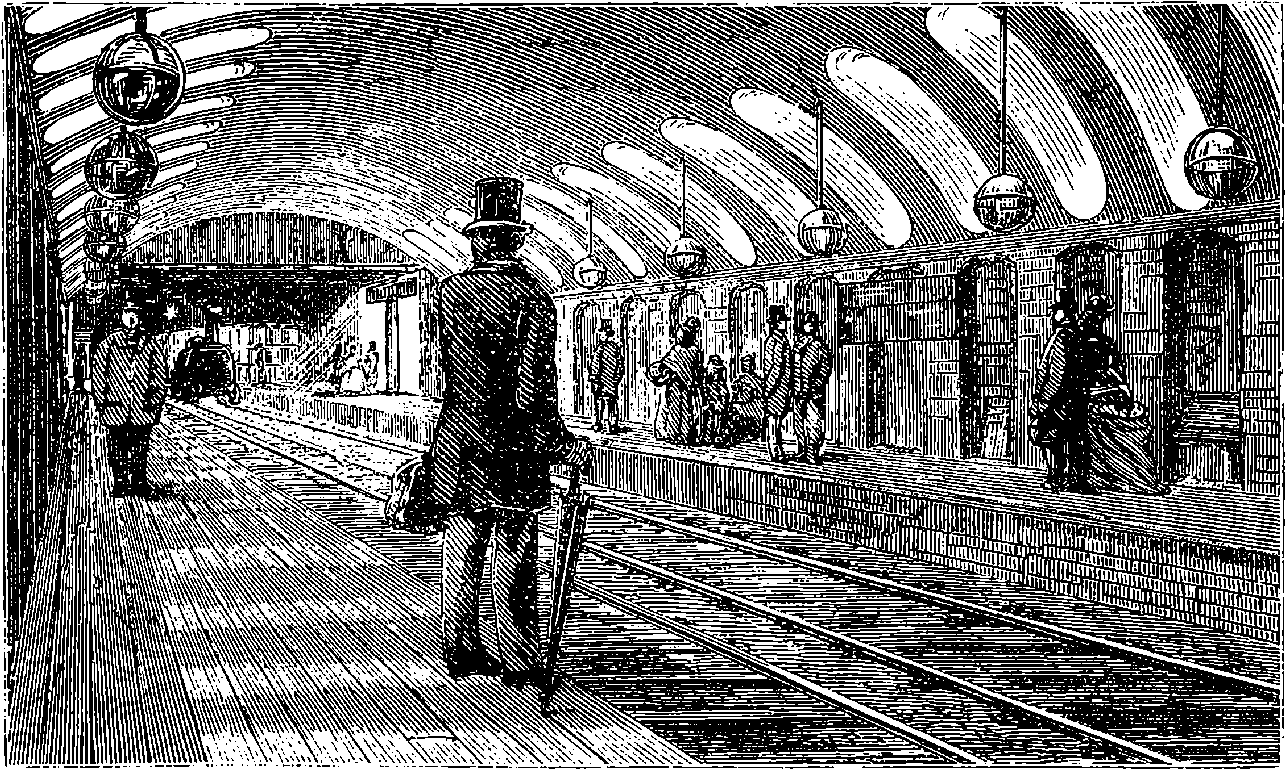
Platforms with ventilation shafts

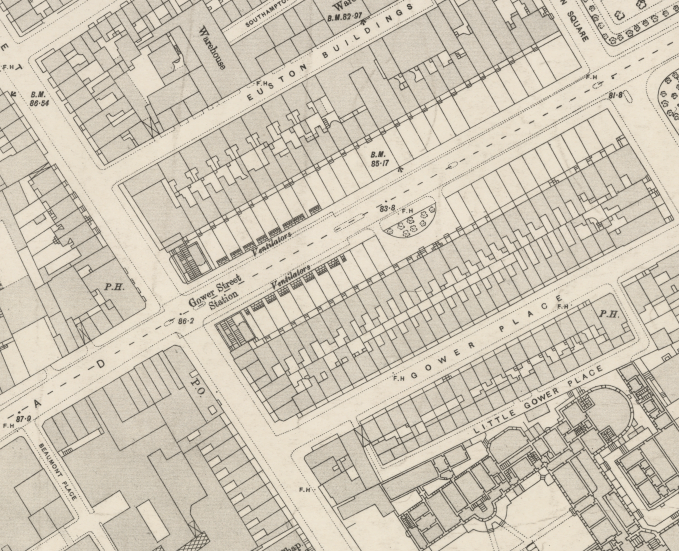
Ordnance Survey map showing station, 1895

The station was opened as Gower Street on 10 January 1863 by the Metropolitan Railway (MR), the world's first underground railway. The line runs east–west under Euston Road at this point. The station originally had entrances in single-storey pavilions with stone-effect stucco render on each side of Euston Road with stairs to the platforms.

The MR was constructed using the cut-and-cover method with the tunnel and station platforms directly under the road. The walls to the rear of the platforms were originally lined in buttressed brickwork supporting a brick arch 45 feet 1 inch (13.74 m) wide and 10 feet 4 inches (3.15 m) high composed of between six and twelve layers of brickwork. Ventilation shafts lined with glazed white tiling were spaced along the platforms to let in light from openings in the front gardens of the houses at street level.

In 1864, Parliament authorised the North Western and Charing Cross Railway to construct a line to connect the mainline stations at Euston and Charing Cross. This would have connected to the MR to the west of Gower Street, but the company was unable to raise funds. A revised scheme under the name of the London Central Railway (LCR) was approved in 1871. The proposals included an interchange at Gower Street with the LCR's platforms north of and parallel to the MR's. LCR branches would have connected from east of Gower Street to Euston and St Pancras stations. As before, the LCR was unable to raise funding and the scheme was abandoned in 1874.

In 1890, the MR obtained parliamentary permission to construct a pedestrian subway under Euston Road from the station to the mainline station. This was never constructed.

In 1906, the original timber platforms were reconstructed in concrete as a fire precaution related to the electrification of the MR. The station was given its present name on 1 November 1909.

Between 1929 and 1931, the station buildings were reconstructed to a design by the MR's architect C. W. Clark. A bridge was constructed above the tracks so that a single ticket office could be provided in place of the separate ones for each platform. At the same time the station platforms were lengthened requiring the closure of Euston Road to enable the roadway and tunnels to be excavated as quickly as possible. The brick arch of the tunnel roof and the side walls were removed and replaced with a flat roof on steel beams supported by concrete walls to the rear of the new platforms.

During World War II, much of the southern side of Euston Road between Gower Street and Gordon Street was destroyed by bombing. When the site was reconstructed post-war the southern entrance was reconstructed again to incorporate it into the corner of the new building that occupied the site. The north entrance remained. In the 1960s, in conjunction with the construction of an underpass at the junction of Euston Road and Tottenham Court Road, Euston Road was widened. At this time, the north entrance building was demolished and converted to a simple subway entrance.

In the 21st century, the buildings on the south side of Euston Road were again redeveloped and the station entrance was again reconstructed. Since late 2006, the south entrance is incorporated into the corner of the headquarters of the Wellcome Trust with the entrance in Gower Street. A linking pedestrian subway connects under Euston Road from the north side. Since 2011, two lifts provide access between the main entrance and the westbound platform.

== Future ==
In December 2005, Network Rail announced plans to create a subway link between the station and Euston station, as part of its re-development for as the London terminus for High Speed 2. This was to have created a step-free interchange link for users of the two stations. As of 2025, the prospects for this plan remain unclear along with the uncertain status of the overall project.

== Services ==
Euston Square station is on the Circle, Hammersmith & City and Metropolitan lines in London fare zone 1. It is between Great Portland Street to the west and King's Cross St Pancras to the east. All three lines share the same pair of tracks from Baker Street Junction to Aldgate Junction making this section of track one of the most intensely used on the network.

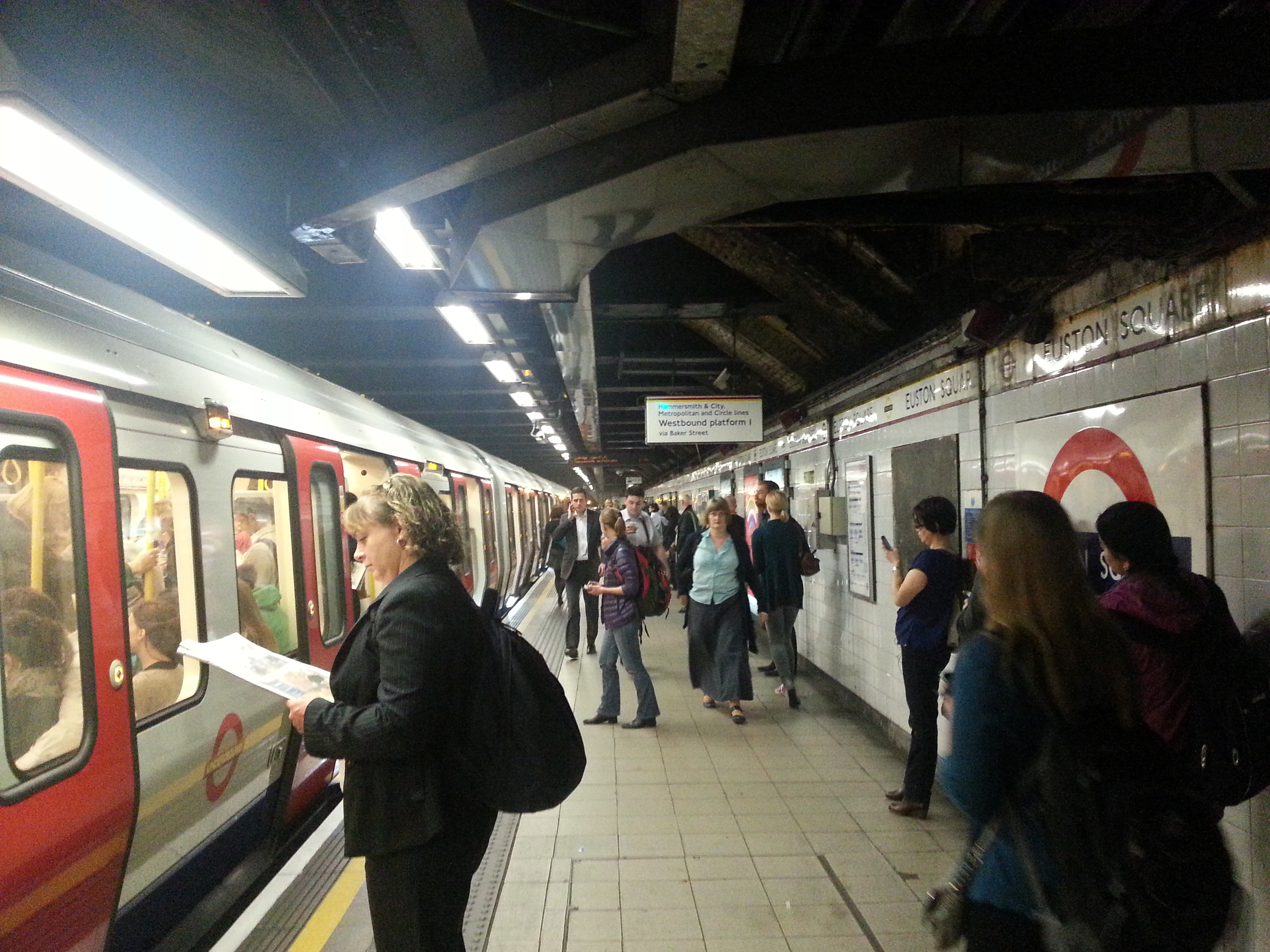
Euston Square at rush hour in 2013

=== Circle line ===
The typical service in trains per hour (tph) is:

- 6 tph clockwise via Liverpool Street and Tower Hill
- 6 tph anti-clockwise to Hammersmith via Paddington

=== Hammersmith & City line ===
The typical service in trains per hour (tph) is:

- 6 tph Eastbound to Barking
- 6 tph Westbound to Hammersmith via Paddington

=== Metropolitan line ===
The Metropolitan line is the only line to operate express services, though currently this is only during peak times (Eastbound 06:30-09:30 / Westbound 16:00-19:00). Fast services run non-stop between Wembley Park, Harrow-on-the-Hill and Moor Park, while semi-fast services run non-stop between Wembley Park and Harrow-on-the-Hill.

The typical off-peak service in trains per hour (tph) is:

- 12 tph Eastbound to Aldgate
- 2 tph Westbound to Amersham (all stations)
- 2 tph Westbound to Chesham (all stations)
- 8 tph Westbound to Uxbridge (all stations)

Off-peak services to/from Watford terminate at Baker Street

The typical peak time service in trains per hour (tph) is:

- 14 tph Eastbound to Aldgate
- 2 tph Westbound to Amersham (fast in the evening peak only)
- 2 tph Westbound to Chesham (fast in the evening peak only)
- 4 tph Westbound to Watford (semi-fast in the evening peak only)
- 6 tph Westbound to Uxbridge (all stations)

Preceding station	London Underground	Following station
Great Portland Street towards Hammersmith	Circle line	King's Cross St Pancras towards Edgware Road via Aldgate
Great Portland Street towards Hammersmith	Hammersmith & City line	King's Cross St Pancras towards Barking
Great Portland Street towards Uxbridge, Amersham, Chesham or Watford	Metropolitan line	King's Cross St Pancras towards Aldgate
Former services
Great Portland Street towards Hammersmith	Metropolitan line Hammersmith branch (1864–1990)	King's Cross St Pancras towards Barking

== Connections ==
That station is served by London Buses day and night routes.

== Bibliography ==
- Badsey-Ellis, Antony (2005). London's Lost Tube Schemes. Capital Transport. ISBN 185414-293-3.
- Badsey-Ellis, Antony (2016). Building London's Underground: From Cut-and Cover to Crossrail. Capital Transport. ISBN 978-1-8541-4397-6.
- Croome, Desmond F. (2003). The Circle Line: An Illustrated History. Capital Transport. ISBN 1-85414-267-4.
- Jackson, Alan A. (1986). London's Metropolitan Railway. David & Charles. ISBN 0-7153-8839-8.
- Lowe, James W. (2014) [1975]. British Steam Locomotives Builders. Pen & Sword Transport. pp. 245–259. ISBN 978-1-47382-289-4. OCLC 889509628.
- Rose, Douglas (1999) [1980]. The London Underground, A Diagrammatic History (7th ed.). Douglas Rose/Capital Transport. ISBN 1-85414-219-4.
- Routledge, Robert (1900). "The Metropolitan Railway". Discoveries And Inventions of the Nineteenth Century (13th ed.). George Routledge & Sons.
