= City and Brixton Railway =

The City and Brixton Railway (C&BR) was an authorised underground railway line in London planned to run from King William Street in the City of London under the River Thames to Brixton via The Borough, Lambeth and The Oval. The company was unable to raise funds and the railway was never constructed.

== Plans ==
In November 1897, notice was published of a private parliamentary bill for an underground railway from the City of London to Brixton. The C&BR plan would have partially utilised the soon-to-be-abandoned tunnels of the City and South London Railway (C&SLR, now the Bank branch of the Northern line) between its northern terminus at King William Street and a point north of Borough station. The C&SLR was planning a new northern extension to Moorgate and was going to close the poorly sited King William Street station and sections of its two running tunnels under the River Thames, replacing them with a new pair of tunnels on a better alignment.

City and Brixton Railway Act 1898
- Act of Parliament
- Parliament of the United Kingdom
- Long title: An Act for incorporating the City and Brixton Railway Company and for empowering them to construct an Underground Railway from the City and South London Railway in the Parish of St. Saviour Southwark to Brixton Hill and for other purposes.
- Citation: 61 & 62 Vict. c. lx

Dates
- Royal assent: 1 July 1898

Text of statute as originally enacted

The C&BR's plan was to use the C&SLR's tunnels to a point just south of a new station at London Bridge (in direct competition with a station planned there by the C&SLR). South of the C&BR's London Bridge station, the C&BR's route was planned to run in new tunnels parallel with the C&SLR past Borough station, but without a station there. The line was then to diverge westwards to provide stations at St George's Circus and Lambeth Road, then south to Kennington Cross, before reaching an interchange at The Oval with the C&SLR. The line would then have headed south with a station at Lorn Road before reaching its destination at Brixton. The proposals received royal assent on 1 July 1898 as the City and Brixton Railway Act 1898 (61 & 62 Vict. c. lx).

The details of the route north of London Bridge changed over the course of the next ten years, as did the financial arrangements with the C&SLR. In 1898, the depot was planned to be adjacent to New Camberwell Road just south of the Oval station but this was removed in 1899 from the plans and replaced with a plan for a link to the C&SLR's depot at Stockwell.

Despite a series of new bills to revise the scheme, the C&BR was never able to raise enough finance to start construction. In 1902, two bills were presented to Parliament for the complete or partial abandonment of the railway. Both were dropped before completing their passage through Parliament. Instead, in 1902, the C&SLR took over the company with the intention of modifying the plans but the powers remained unused and eventually lapsed. It was not until almost 70 years later that the Underground reached Brixton with the opening of the final section of the Victoria line in 1971.
