= Fares Fair =

Policy of the Greater London Council

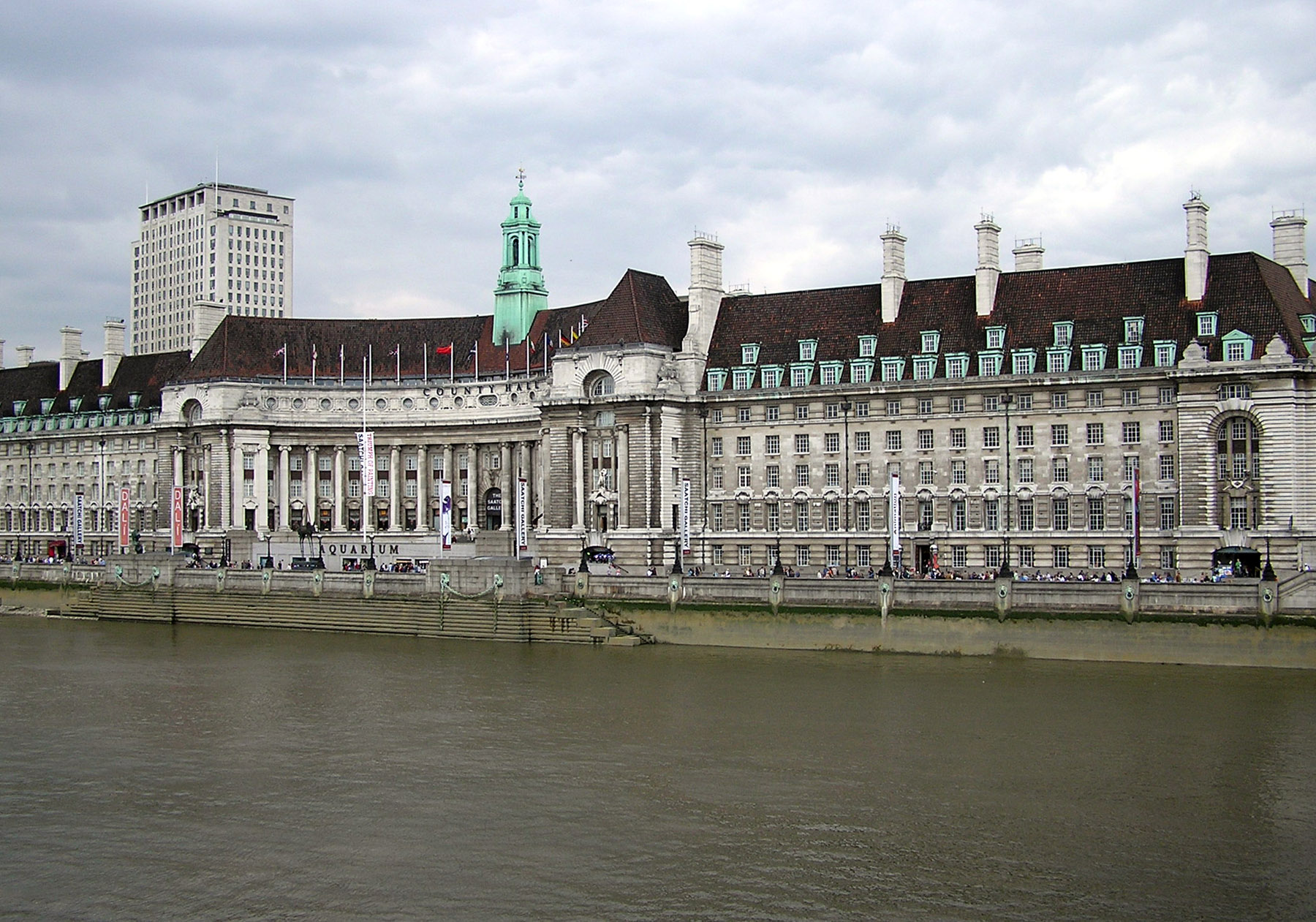
County Hall in Lambeth, then home of the Greater London Council.

Fares Fair was a public policy advocated by the Labour Party administration of the Greater London Council (GLC), then led by Ken Livingstone. The policy of low public transport fares was implemented in 1981, but was later ruled to be illegal in the courts and rescinded the following year.

The Fares Fair policy had widespread support among Labour London members, who viewed it as a moderate and mainstream policy; no one had ever considered the legality of the move. In the 1981 GLC election, the political moderate Andrew McIntosh led Labour to victory, but the following day he was voted out by the Labour members of the GLC and replaced by Livingstone. Proceeding with the Fares Fair policy which they had promised in their electoral manifesto, they reduced London Transport fares by 31 percent in October 1981.

The legality of the Fares Fair policy was subsequently challenged by Dennis Barkway, Conservative leader of the Bromley London Borough Council. Taking the GLC to court, Barkway argued that the citizens of the London Borough of Bromley were having to pay extra taxes for the London Underground, which did not serve the borough.

== Background ==
In the 1970s, Sheffield City Council's leader, David Blunkett (later to become an MP and Home secretary), had implemented a very successful subsidy system for the city's bus service. The fares were very attractive and the frequency of service on all routes provided a bus every five minutes or so (except Sundays). A typical journey cost between 2 1/2 to 5 pence (an average fare in other towns and cities was around 40 to 50 pence). A consequence of the low fares and good frequency of service was that most residents chose to travel into Sheffield by bus rather than use their car, even though public car parking was similarly cheap (primarily in order to compete). A further consequence was that unimpeded by cars, the buses were able to move around relatively freely. It was this model that London's Labour controlled council wished to emulate.

In 1979, the incumbent Labour government of James Callaghan lost the United Kingdom general election, to be replaced by a Conservative government under the leadership of Margaret Thatcher. The 1979 Conservative manifesto had stated that "Any future government which sets out honestly to reduce inflation and taxation will have to make substantial economies, and there should be no doubt about our intention to do so." The party had also stated that it did not want to implement unpopular spending cuts to the National Health Service, social security and defence, and so the funding cuts instead fell primarily on housing, education and social services, programmes which were primarily provided not by central government but by local authorities. Thatcher's newly appointed Secretary of State for the Environment, Michael Heseltine, was charged with decreasing local government spending; problematically for Heseltine, there was a tradition of local autonomy in England which he was hesitant to rein in under centralised control, something that would have angered traditional Conservative supporters. The government at the time stated that their policy was that all public transport should be able to operate without any subsidy (this was never achieved in practice).

Central to Heseltine's reforms was the Grant Related Expenditure Assessment (GREA), an educated estimate of how much each individual council had to spend to provide an average standard of service. Under Heseltine's new system, if a local council spent at GRE, its ratepayers would have to pay no more than the standard, national-average rate. Alternately, if a council spent more than its GRE, the local ratepayers would have to pay an increasing percentage of the financial burden. This, he hoped, would influence local authorities to keep their spending at the GRE.

== Initiation ==
Labour's 1981 GLC manifesto commitment was to subsidise fares on all London Buses, London Underground and British Rail services in Greater London. This would cause a reduction in fares of approximately a third and cause a corresponding increase in the transport costs of the GLC. The funding for the change was planned to come from a 5% increase in local government rates. The subsidy to British Rail was blocked by central government, which restricted the policy to the buses and the London Underground.

Because the rate demand for 1981 had already been issued some seven months earlier, the GLC attempted to raise the funding for the scheme up until April 1982 by issuing a supplementary rate demand for the extra money. This had the unintended consequence that it gave London ratepayers full visibility of how much the scheme was costing them.

Once the fares fair scheme was up and running, people travelling around London enjoyed fare reductions of about one third on buses and the London Underground, though the better off rate payers were expected to pay more than the savings in extra rates. This was as the GLC council intended, the better off subsidising the transport costs of the poorer residents of London.

== Legal challenge ==
Late in 1981, the conservative Bromley Council under the leadership of Dennis Barkway instigated a legal challenge of the "fares fair" policy in the courts. The challenge hinged on three factors.

- That Bromley ratepayers were being required to subsidise the London Underground when Bromley had no service within its borders (or indeed anywhere near).
- That the more affluent ratepayers were not only having to subsidise the poorer residents but were also subsidising users of the buses and underground who travelled into London from outside of its borders and were able to fully benefit from the fare reductions but without having to subsidise them in any way. Consequent on this, an allegation was made that Ken Livingstone was not acting in the best interests of the Ratepayers that he represented.
- That the subsidy was not in accordance with government policy on transport having to be self financing.

In addition, Bromley Council initiated a legal challenge against London Transport itself, saying that it had no right to reduce its fares on the back of such an unlawful subsidy scheme. The court's decision was that the GLC's fares fair policy was unlawful for all the reasons given by Bromley and had to be discontinued. It found that the supplementary rate demands issued by the GLC were void and that no ratepayer had to pay them (the GLC was required to refund any ratepayer who had already paid).

London Transport was similarly instructed that its reduction of the fares was unlawful (as it was dependent on an unlawful subsidy), and the fares had to be restored to a level where the buses and underground were self funding.

As a direct result, the fares on both the buses and Underground were raised to a level that was significantly higher than fares pre-reduction. This was because London Transport had to recover the shortfall in income resulting from the fare reduction which it had expected to receive from the GLC but was no longer going to receive.
