= North Western and Charing Cross Railway =

The North Western and Charing Cross Railway (NW&CCR) was a railway company established in 1864 to construct an underground railway in London. The NW&CCR was one of many underground railway schemes proposed for London following the opening in 1863 of the Metropolitan Railway, the world's first underground railway, but was one of only a few to be authorised by Parliament. The company struggled to raise funding for the construction of its line and was twice renamed, to the Euston, St Pancras and Charing Cross Railway and the London Central Railway, before the proposals were abandoned in 1874.

== North Western and Charing Cross Railway ==
North Western and Charing Cross Railway Act 1864 (Note: Section 1.)
- Act of Parliament
- Parliament of the United Kingdom
- Long title: An Act for making Railways from the Hampstead Road to the Charing Cross Railway at Hungerford, with a Branch to the London and North-western Railway; and for making new Streets from Tottenham Court Road to Chandos Street, Strand, and from the Strand to Duke Street; and for other Purposes.
- Citation: 27 & 28 Vict. c. cccxxiii
- Territorial extent: United Kingdom

Dates
- Royal assent: 29 July 1864
- Commencement: 29 July 1864 (Note: The Acts of Parliament (Commencement) Act 1793.)

Status: Current legislation

Text of statute as originally enacted

The Metropolitan Railway opened to the public on 10 January 1863 and was quickly seen as being a great success, carrying 9.5 million passengers in its first year. On 27 November 1863, the NW&CCR's private bill was announced, one of many speculative underground railways being promoted that hoped to emulate the MR's success. The North Western and Charing Cross Railway Act 1864 (27 & 28 Vict. c. cccxxiii) received royal assent on 29 July 1864, but most of the others were unsuccessful. (Note: Thirty-three underground railway schemes were proposed. Six proposals failed due to the deposit not being paid and most of the rest were rejected by a parliamentary joint committee set up to review them.)

The NW&CCR's proposed line was to run between the London and North Western Railway's (L&NWR's) terminus at Euston and the South Eastern Railway's (SER's) terminus at Charing Cross (then still under construction), with both mainline companies supporting the proposals. Like the MR, the NW&CCR was to be constructed as a cut and cover tunnel running beneath roads and a new road south of Oxford Street was to be constructed along the proposed route. At the northern end, branches were proposed to connect to the MR near Portland Road (now Great Portland Street) and Gower Street (now Euston Square) stations and to the L&NWR and the Midland Railway north of Euston station. At the southern end, the line was to come to the surface to connect to the SER's tracks on Hungerford Bridge.

A further act of Parliament, the North Western and Charing Cross Railway Act 1866 (29 & 30 Vict. c. cccxi), gave permission for the NW&CCR to make agreements with the L&NWR and the SER to operate trains over its line and to agree fares. The mainline companies were each to be offered half of the NW&CCR's shares.

To fund construction of the railway, The NW&CCR intended to pay the contractors constructing the line in its shares, which, it was expected, would increase in value and pay dividends once the railway was operational. This was a common method of payment for capital-intensive railway projects. To pay for the actual works during construction period, contractors were financed by banks; however, before work could start on the NW&CCR a number of contractors and banks failed in the Panic of 1866, a major crash in the London and international stock markets, after which the NW&CCR found it impossible to raise the funding it needed to begin construction and the proposals were abandoned in 1869.

== Euston, St Pancras and Charing Cross Railway and London Central Railway ==
In November 1870, the NW&CCR's proposals were revived under a new name. The Euston, St Pancras and Charing Cross Railway (EStP&CCR) proposals were similar to those of the NW&CCR. A station was to be provided at Gower Street parallel and adjacent to the MR's station there to provide an interchange between the lines. Additional to the NW&CCR's proposals, two additional tunnels would have extended eastwards from the Gower Street station to connect to Euston station and the Midland Railway's recently opened St Pancras station.

After the EStP&CCR tunnel had passed under the MR's tunnel near the junction of Tottenham Court Road and Euston Road, the line would have run roughly south by south-east on the west side of Whitfield Street to the next station at Goodge Street and then a station at Oxford Street. South of Oxford Street, the line continued on a more southerly route to Leicester Square where a station was to be built on the north side of the square. The route would then have turned south-west to pass north of the church of St Martin-in-the-Fields before reaching the final station on the north side of Strand opposite the mainline station. Beyond the station the EStP&CCR continued under Strand before rising to the surface between the mainline station and Villiers Street on a viaduct which would have connected to the SER's bridge over the River Thames as planned by the NW&CCR. The tunnels were to be 26 feet (7.9 m) wide and 14 feet (4.3 m) high for use by the mainline companies' trains. Vents were to be provided along the route to allow smoke and steam to escape from the tunnels. Between Oxford Street and Chandos Street, a new road was to be constructed over the railway to which the Metropolitan Board of Works agreed to contribute £200,000. The estimated costs of constructing the tunnels and new road were £1.4 million and £280,000 respectively.

London Central Railway Act 1871
- Act of Parliament
- Parliament of the United Kingdom
- Long title: An Act for incorporating the London Central Railway Company, and authorising them to make and maintain the London Central Railway; and to make new Streets between Oxford Street and Leicester Square and be tween Leicester Square and Castle Street; and for other purposes.
- Citation: 34 & 35 Vict. c. ccii
- Territorial extent: United Kingdom

Dates
- Royal assent: 14 August 1871
- Commencement: 14 August 1871

Other legislation
- Repealed by: London Central Railway (Abandonment) Act 1875

Status: Repealed

Text of statute as originally enacted

London Central Railway (Abandonment) Act 1875
- Act of Parliament
- Parliament of the United Kingdom
- Long title: An Act for authorising the abandonment of the Railways and Streets authorised by "The London Central Railway Act, 1871;" and for other purposes.
- Citation: 38 & 39 Vict. c. cxiv
- Territorial extent: United Kingdom

Dates
- Royal assent: 29 June 1875
- Commencement: 29 June 1875
- Repealed: 31 January 2013

Other legislation
- Repeals/revokes: London Central Railway Act 1871

Status: Repealed

Text of statute as originally enacted

The London Central Railway Act 1871 (34 & 35 Vict. c. ccii) received royal assent on 14 August 1871. Following this, the company changed its name to the London Central Railway (LCR), but, again, the company struggled to raise funding for the construction. In 1873, an extension of time was obtained to grant the LCR additional time to construct the railway, but proposals for an additional connection to King's Cross station and to the MR at St Pancras were rejected. The LCR's financial situation failed to improve and the proposal was abandoned again in 1874, being formally dropped by the London Central Railway (Abandonment) Act 1875 (38 & 39 Vict. c. cxiv).

== See also ==
- Charing Cross, Euston and Hampstead Railway – 1907 underground railway that used a similar alignment (now part of the Northern line)
- Snow Hill Tunnel (London) – similar cross city tunnel constructed by the London Chatham and Dover Railway between Ludgate Hill and Farringdon

== Bibliography ==
- Badsey-Ellis, Antony (2005). London's Lost Tube Schemes. Capital Transport. ISBN 1-85414-293-3.
- Walford, Edward (1878). New and Old London: Volume 5. British History Online.
