= King William Street tube station =

Former railway station in England

King William Street
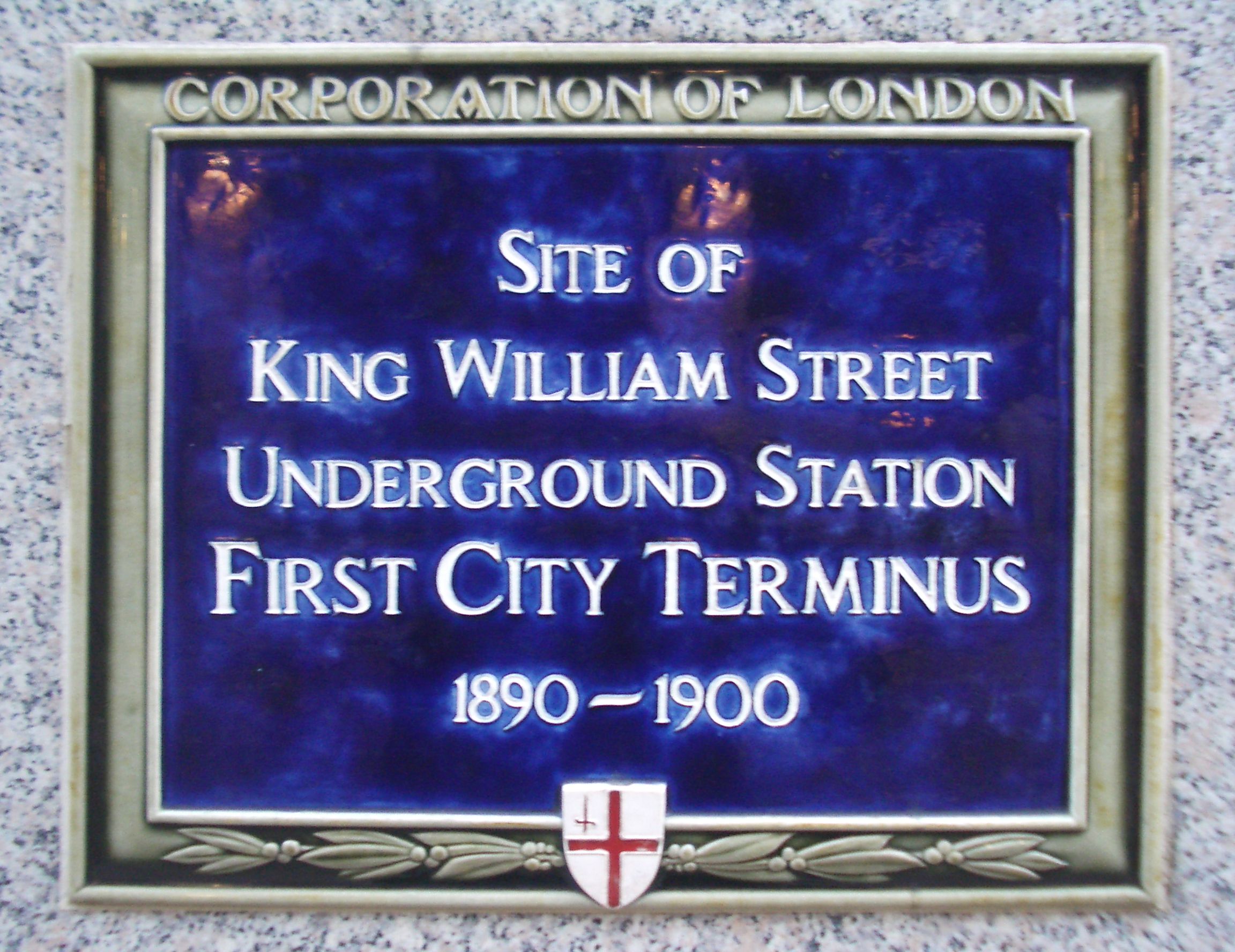
- Plaque marking the location of the station
- Interactive map of King William Street

General information
- Location: City of London
- Owner: City & South London Railway
- Number of platforms: 2

Key dates
- 18 December 1890: Opened
- 24 February 1900: Closed
- Replaced by: Bank

Other information
- Coordinates: 51°30′37″N 0°05′13″W

King William Street was the original but short-lived northern terminus of the City and South London Railway (C&SLR), the first successful deep-level underground railway in London and one of the component parts of the London Underground's Northern line. It was located in the City of London, on King William Street, just south of the present Monument station. When King William Street was in operation the next station to the south was Borough and the southern terminus of the line was Stockwell.

The station was in operation for less than ten years. It was named after the street above, which in turn was named after King William IV.

London Transport Museum runs regular virtual tours of the station through its "Hidden London" programme. The tour also explores how the Bank redevelopment project utilised the original 1890 station to build the current platforms and passageways.

== History ==
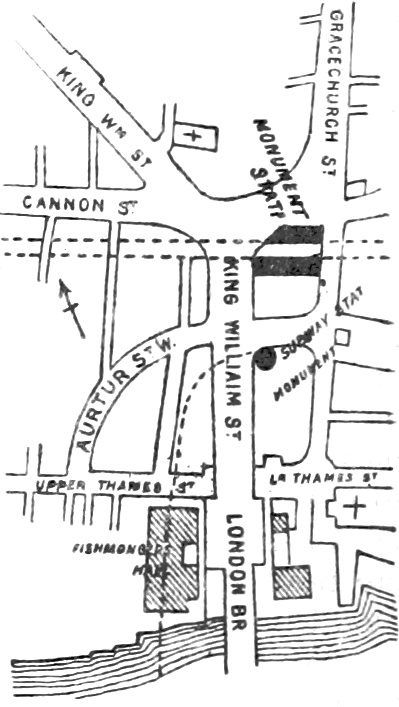
1888 map showing the location of the station, with the then newly opened Monument Station. The representation of the C&SLR line is inaccurate; the line actually ran under Arthur Street.

King William Street opened on 18 December 1890 and was constructed from a large masonry station tunnel, accessed from the surface by a lift shaft or spiral staircase. Two platforms were provided, one on each side of the single, central track – one for passengers entering and the other for passengers leaving the trains – a system later referred to as the Spanish solution. The station tunnel itself is situated beneath Monument Street and runs east–west across King William Street, ending beneath Arthur Street. The approach running tunnels had tight curves and steep gradients in order to pass underneath the River Thames while following underneath public roads, especially Swan Lane and Arthur Street. The combination of station layout and poor alignment of the running tunnels severely limited the capacity of the station and, in the years after opening, a number of initiatives were made to improve operations. In 1895, a central island platform with tracks each side was constructed to enable two trains to occupy the station at once; however, capacity was still restricted.

When the line was extended northwards to Moorgate, new running tunnels on a different alignment, but still running beneath Borough High Street, were constructed running from below St George the Martyr's church, north of Borough station, to a new station at London Bridge and onwards to an alternative City station at Bank. Under the Thames, the present running tunnels of the Northern line are situated to the east of London Bridge, whereas the King William Street tunnels pass to the west of the bridge, with the southbound tunnel below the northbound track as the line passes under the Thames.

The station closed from Monday 26 February 1900 when the Moorgate extension opened.

The original station building was demolished in the 1930s, although the parts of the station below ground were converted for use as a public air-raid shelter during World War II. Access today is via a manhole in the basement of Regis House, a contemporary office building, where the original cast iron spiral staircase leads down to platform level. The lift shaft was filled in with concrete during the construction of the original Regis House. The original running tunnels north of Borough station remain, although when the Jubilee line extension was built in the late 1990s, the old southbound tunnel was cut through as part of the construction works at London Bridge station in order to provide the lift shaft situated at the south end of the Northern line platforms. These running tunnels are now used as a ventilation shaft for the station and the openings for several adits to the old running tunnels can be seen in the roofs of the Northern line platform tunnels and in the central concourse between them. A construction shaft between London Bridge and King William Street, beneath Old Swan Wharf, now functions as a pump shaft for the disused sections of the running tunnels. It is no longer possible to walk through between the two stations as the old C&SLR running tunnels have been blocked off with concrete bulkheads on both sides of the Thames. The tunnels were further severed by upgrades to Bank station, as the construction shaft for the new Northern line tunnel, located in Arthur Street, cuts straight through the approach tunnel to King William Street station, with the station site itself linked to the new tunnel via a ventilation adit.

Former services
Preceding station	London Underground	Following station
Borough towards Stockwell	Northern line (1890-1900)	Terminus
