= Cranley Gardens railway station =

Former railway station in north London, England

Cranley Gardens
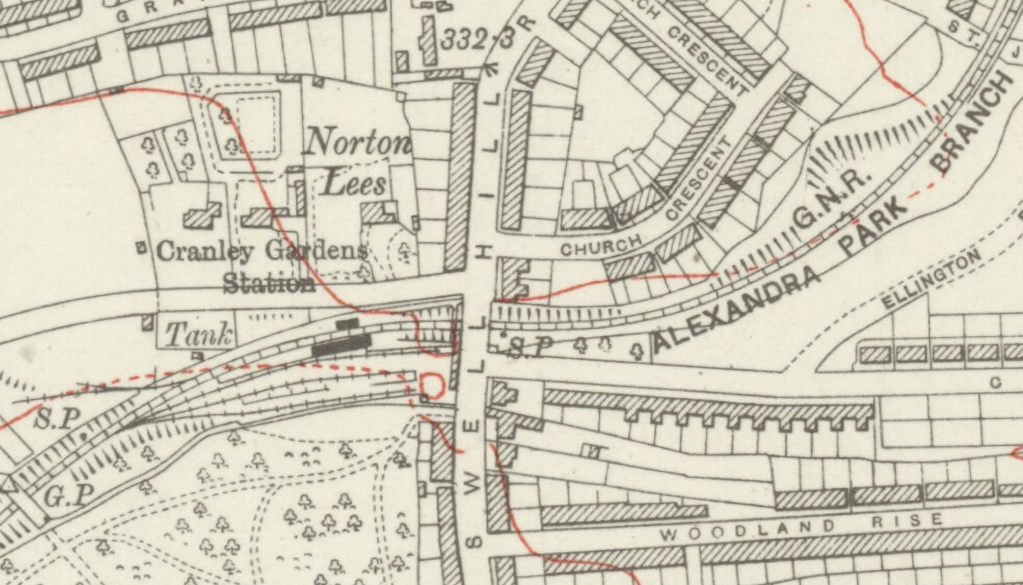
- The station on a 1920 map
- Interactive map of Cranley Gardens

General information
- Location: Highgate
- Local authority: Haringey
- Grid reference: TQ283891
- Number of platforms: 2

Railway companies
- Original company: Great Northern Railway
- Pre-grouping: Great Northern Railway
- Post-grouping: London and North Eastern Railway

Key dates
- 1873: Line opened (MHR)
- 1902: Station opened (MHR)
- 1930: Closed (LNER)
- 1932: Reopened (LNER)
- 1951: Closed (BR)
- 1952: Reopened (BR)
- 1954: Closed (passengers) (BR)
- 1957: Closed (goods) (BR)

Other information
- Coordinates: 51°35′11″N 0°8′53″W

Cranley Gardens railway station served the south-west area of the Muswell Hill district, in north London, England, between 1902 and 1957. It was located between Highgate and Muswell Hill stations, at the junction of Muswell Hill Road and Cranley Gardens. Nothing remains of the station today and its site is now occupied by housing and a school. In the 1930s, plans were made to electrify the line and transfer the main line service to London Underground's Northern line, but these were abandoned after the Second World War. The station closed for passengers in 1954 and for goods in 1957.

== History ==
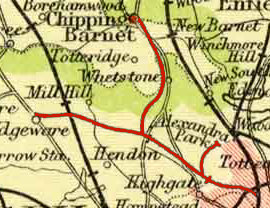
Great Northern Railway's Northern Heights branches, 1900

The branch line from the Great Northern Railway's (GNR) station at Highgate to Alexandra Palace was built by the Muswell Hill Railway (MHR) and opened on 24 May 1873. Cranley Gardens station opened on 2 August 1902. In 1911, the line was taken over by the GNR. After the Railways Act 1921 created the Big Four railway companies, the line became part of the London & North Eastern Railway (LNER) from 1923, which closed the station on 1 December 1930 and reopened it in July 1932.

In 1935, the London Passenger Transport Board (LPTB) planned, as part of its Northern Heights plan to take over the line from LNER, together with its routes from Finsbury Park to Edgware and High Barnet. The line was to be modernised to use electric trains and amalgamated with the Northern line. At Finsbury Park, the line was to be connected to the Northern line's City branch, so that services from Cranley Gardens would have continued to Moorgate.

Works to modernise the track began in the late 1930s and were well advanced when they were halted by the Second World War. Works were completed from Highgate to High Barnet and Mill Hill East and that section was incorporated into the Northern line. Works on the tracks between Finsbury Park and Alexandra Palace were halted and the LNER continued to be operate the line. In 1942, LNER services through Cranley Gardens were reduced to rush hour only operations.

After the war, no work was carried out as maintenance works and reconstruction of war damage on the existing network had the greatest call on LPTB funds. Funds for new works were severely limited and priority was given to the completion of the western and eastern extensions of the Central line to West Ruislip, Epping and Hainault. Despite being shown as under construction on underground maps as late as 1950, (Note: Shown as "under construction", the Northern Heights extensions appeared for the first time on Underground poster maps in 1937 and pocket maps in 1938. After the opening of the tube platforms at Highgate and the extensions to High Barnet and Mill Hill East, the uncompleted remainder of the works were removed from the map between 1943 and 1945. The Mill Hill East to Edgware, and Edgware to Bushey Heath sections appeared on the map again from 1946 to 1949 and the Finsbury Park to Alexandra Palace section appeared from 1946 to 1950.) work never restarted on the unimplemented parts of the Northern Heights plan. British Railways (the successor to the LNER) closed the line temporarily from 29 October 1951 until 7 January 1952, before the last passenger services ran between Finsbury Park and Alexandra Palace on 3 July 1954.

The line continued to be used for goods services until 18 May 1957, when it was closed completely. The track was subsequently removed and the buildings were demolished.

Disused railways
Muswell Hill; Line and station closed	British Railways (Eastern Region); Alexandra Palace Line	Highgate; Line closed, station open
Abandoned Northern Heights extension
Preceding station	London Underground	Following station
Muswell Hill towards Alexandra Palace	Northern line	Highgate towards Moorgate

== The site today ==
The station buildings and platforms remained until they were demolished in the late 1960s, although the road bridge on Muswell Hill Road is extant. St James' primary school now occupies the site, which opened in 1968. A care home also shared the site, but this was demolished in 2023. As of February 2026, a new development of flats is being built on the site, between the road bridge and the school.

Most of the trackbed between Muswell Hill and Finsbury Park is now a rail trail, the Parkland Walk.

== See also ==
- Edgware, Highgate and London Railway
