= Crouch End railway station =

Disused railway station in north London, England

Crouch End
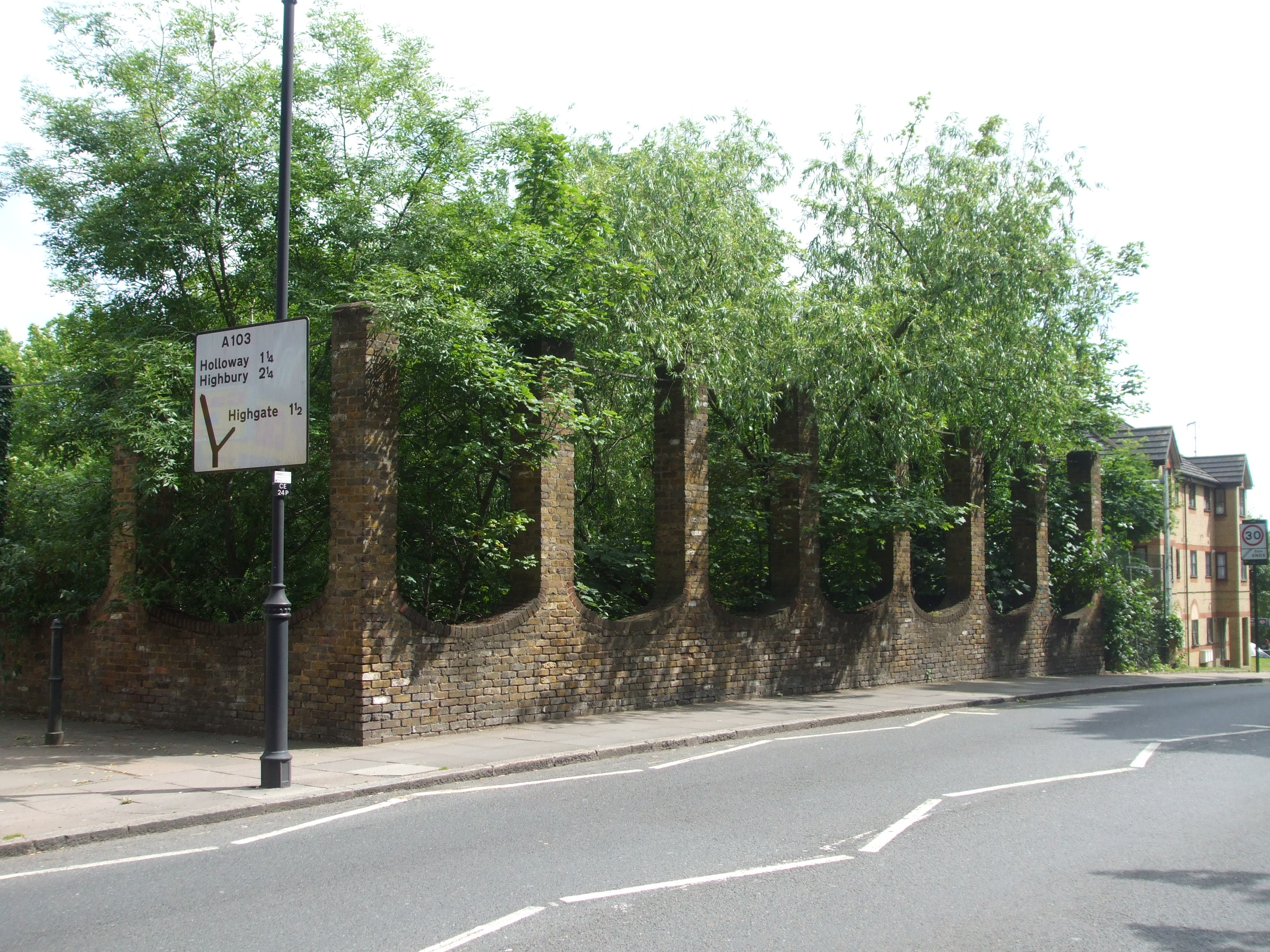
- The site of the Crouch End station building, 2010
- Interactive map of Crouch End

General information
- Location: Crouch End
- Local authority: Haringey
- Owner: Great Northern Railway
- Number of platforms: 2

Key dates
- 1867: Opened
- 29 October 1951: Closed
- 7 January 1952: Open
- 5 July 1954: Closed permanently
- Replaced by: none

Other information
- Coordinates: 51.57411°N 0.12692°W

Crouch End railway station served the suburb of Crouch End, in north London, England, between 1867 and 1954. It lay between Stroud Green and Highgate stations on Crouch End Hill, just north of its junction with Hornsey Lane. The station building was located on the road bridge over the railway, but only small parts remain of the structure today.

== History ==
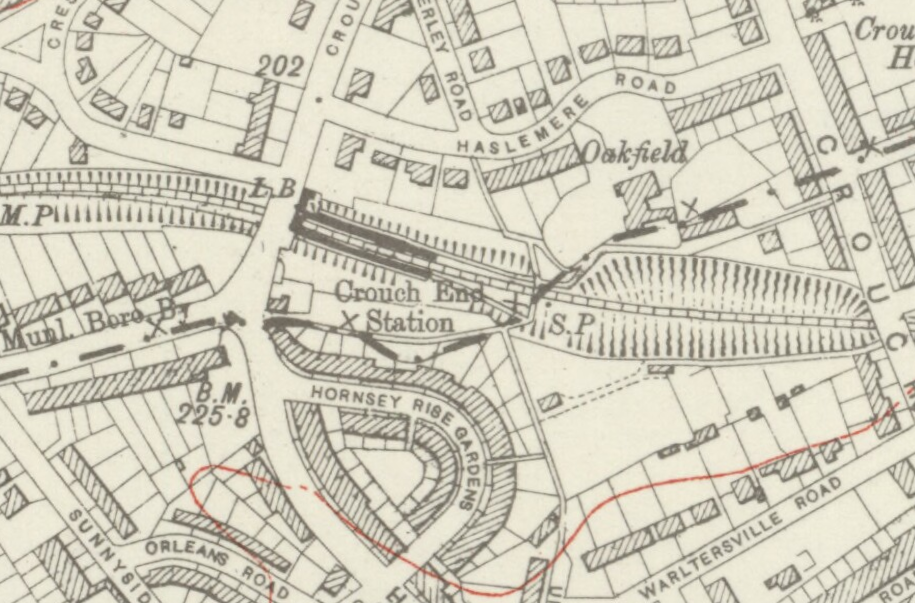
A map of the station's location, 1920

The station was built by the Edgware, Highgate and London Railway and opened on 22 August 1867. The line ran from Finsbury Park to Edgware, via Highgate with branches to Alexandra Palace and High Barnet. After the Railways Act 1921 created the Big Four railway companies, the line became part of the London & North Eastern Railway (LNER) from 1923.

In 1935, London Underground planned, as part of its Northern Heights plan, to take over the line from LNER, modernise it for use with electric trains and amalgamate it with the Northern line.

Works to modernise the track began in the late 1930s; they were well advanced when they were interrupted and halted by the Second World War. Works were completed from Highgate to High Barnet and Mill Hill East and that section was incorporated into the Northern line between 1939 and 1941. Further works on the section between Finsbury Park, Highgate and Alexandra Palace were postponed, and the line continued under the operation of the LNER. Services were reduced to rush hour operation only, due to wartime economies, so that dwindling passenger numbers and a shortage of funds led to the cancellation of the unfinished works in 1950.

British Railways (the successor to the LNER) closed the line temporarily from 29 October 1951 until 7 January 1952; it closed all stations on the line to passenger services (except Finsbury Park) after the last train on 3 July 1954.

The line continued to be used for goods into the 1960s and by London Underground for train stock movements until September 1970; it was completely closed on 5 October 1970.

Disused railways
| Highgate; Line closed, station partly open | British Railways (Eastern Region); Edgware, Highgate and London Railway | Stroud Green; Line and station closed |
Abandoned Northern Heights extension
| Preceding station | London Underground | Following station |
| Highgate towards Bushey Heath, High Barnet or Alexandra Palace | Northern line | Stroud Green via Northern City Line towards Moorgate |

== The site today ==
The track has been removed and the station buildings have been demolished, but the platforms remain in situ. Most of the track bed between Muswell Hill and Finsbury Park is now a rail trail, called the Parkland Walk.
