= Highgate tube station =

London Underground and former railway station

Highgate
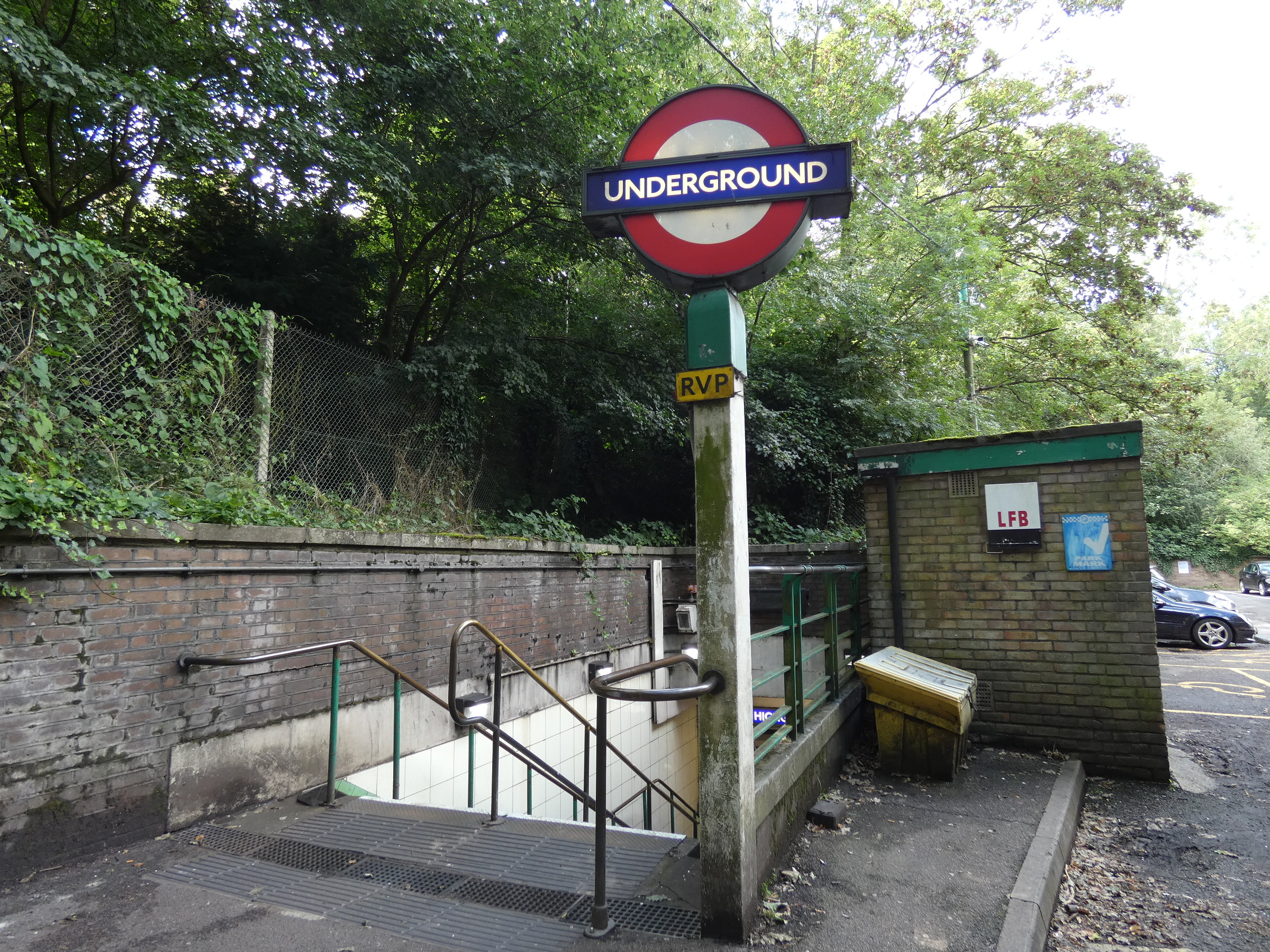
- The Archway Road entrance to the station
- Interactive map of Highgate

General information
- Location: Highgate
- Local authority: London Borough of Haringey
- Managed by: London Underground
- Number of platforms: 2
- Fare zone: 3

London Underground annual entry and exit
- 2021: ▲2.43 million
- 2022: ▲4.24 million
- 2023: ▲4.41 million
- 2024: ▲4.45 million
- 2025: ▼4.44 million

Key dates
- 22 August 1867: Opened (surface platforms)
- 19 January 1941: Northern line platforms opened
- 3 July 1954: Surface platforms closed
- 1970: Surface tracks closed to all traffic

Other information
- External links: TfL station info page
- Coordinates: 51.5777°N 0.1458°W

Highgate is a London Underground station and a former railway station on Archway Road, in north London, England. The station takes its name from nearby Highgate Village. It lies on the High Barnet branch of the Northern line, between East Finchley and Archway.

The station was originally opened in 1867, on the Great Northern Railway's line between Finsbury Park and Edgware stations. As part of their only partially-completed Northern Heights plan, the London Underground started serving the station in 1941, using new platforms in tunnels beneath the surface station. The platforms of the surface station remain, but were last used in 1954; the section of the line through them to Finsbury Park was closed in 1970 and lifted by 1972. One of the original 1867 station buildings is extant and is in use as a private house.

== History ==
=== Original station ===
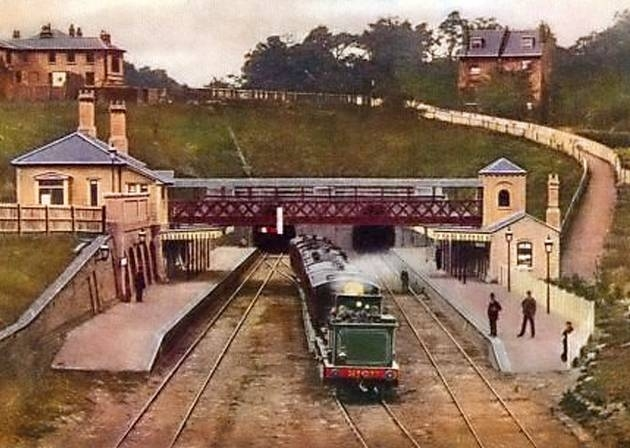
View looking north-west

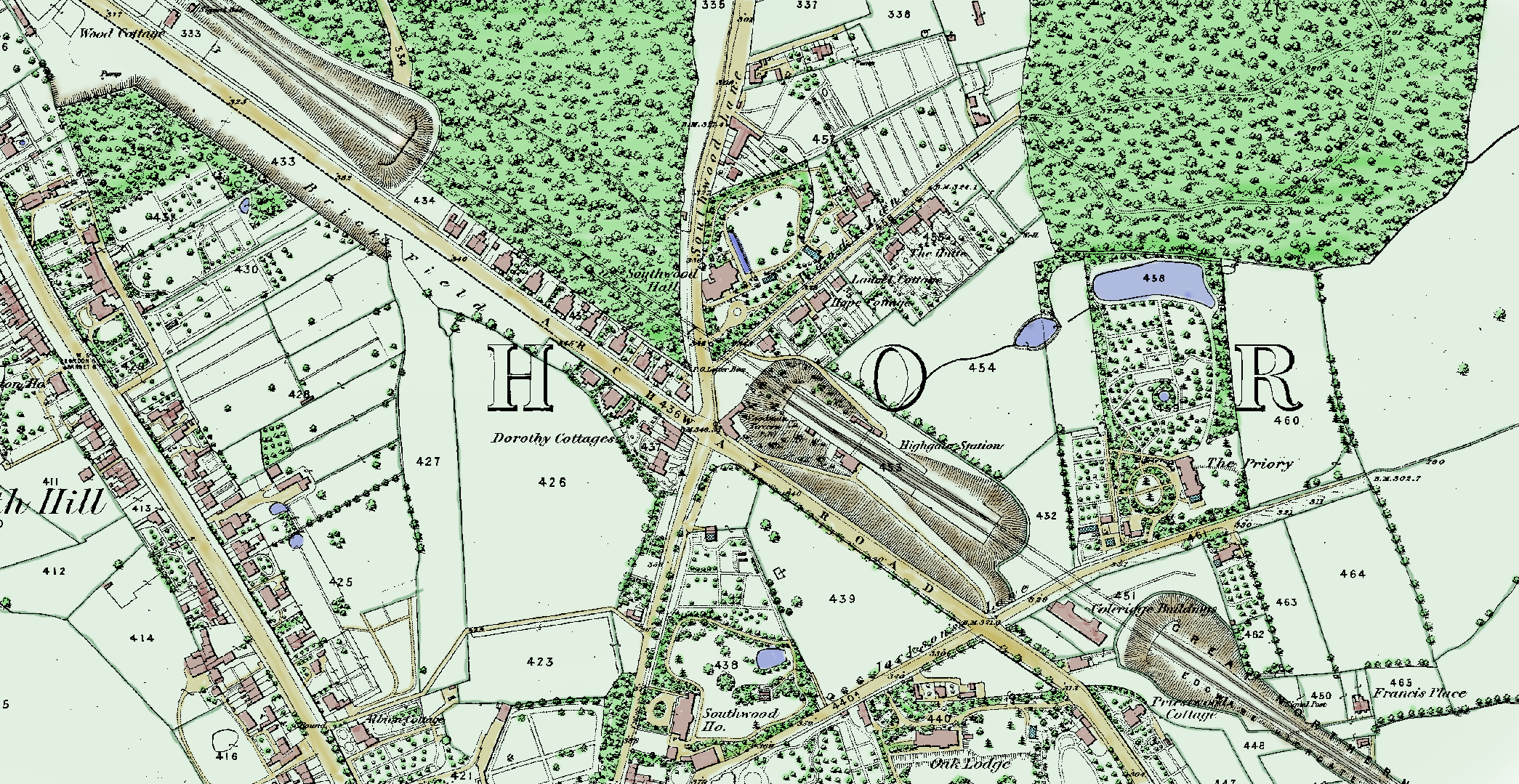
Ordnance survey map

Highgate station around 1870
(before 1880s reconstruction)

Highgate station was originally constructed by the Edgware, Highgate and London Railway in the 1860s on its line from Finsbury Park to Edgware. Before the line was opened, it was purchased in July 1867 by the larger Great Northern Railway (GNR), whose main line from London King's Cross ran through Finsbury Park on its way to Potters Bar and the north. The station opened along with the railway to Edgware on 22 August 1867. (Note: A branch from Finchley Central to High Barnet opened on 1 April 1872.)

Due to the hilly terrain, the station was built in a deep cutting excavated from Highgate Hill, adjacent to Archway Road. Tunnels penetrated the hillside at each end of the station, leading towards East Finchley to the north and Crouch End to the south. When built, the station had two side platforms, with three tracks between them, and a station building on the south side. A footbridge linked the two platforms.

A branch line was constructed from Highgate to Alexandra Palace by the Muswell Hill Railway (MHR) and was opened on 24 May 1873. The new branch split from the original route north of the station in a wide arc around Highgate Wood. The next station on the branch line, once opened, was Muswell Hill and an intermediate station was built later at Cranley Gardens in 1902.

In the 1880s, the station was rebuilt, with two tracks flanking a central island platform instead of the two side platforms. The island platform was accessed from a ticket office in the middle of the footbridge. In 1911, the MHR branch was taken over by the GNR. After the Railways Act 1921 created the Big Four railway companies, the GNR became part of the London & North Eastern Railway (LNER) in 1923.

At the start of the 1930s, the station had around 54 trains daily from High Barnet, 43 from Alexandra Palace and a few through trains from Edgware. Services ran to Finsbury Park and then either King's Cross, Moorgate or Broad Street. (Note: Trains to Moorgate ran to King's Cross York Road then used the City Widened Lines. Trains to Broad Street ran via the Canonbury curve and the North London Railway.)

=== Northern Heights project ===
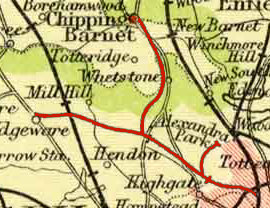
GNR lines from Finsbury Park to Edgware, High Barnet and Alexandra Palace, 1900; this is the route to be absorbed into the Northern line

In 1935, the London Passenger Transport Board (LPTB) announced a proposal, which became known as the Northern Heights project. This was to take over the LNER lines from Finsbury Park to Edgware, High Barnet and Alexandra Palace, then link them to both the Northern line at East Finchley and the Northern City line at Finsbury Park. (Note: Edgware's LNER station was to be closed, with the end of the line diverted into the Northern line's own station.) The construction of the first phase of this project involved extending tube train services from the Northern line's existing terminus at Archway (then called Highgate), through a new section of paired tunnels under Highgate station to emerge south of East Finchley station, where track connections to the LNER line were made.

To provide an interchange between the new deep-level platforms and the existing surface platforms, a subterranean concourse was constructed immediately beneath the existing station. The concourse was connected to the deep-level platforms with escalators and to the existing platforms by stairs. Street entrances to the concourse were provided from the south (Archway Road) and the north (Priory Gardens). At the same time, the buildings on the surface platforms were partly reconstructed and the footbridge was removed. Northern line services through the new tunnels to East Finchley started operating on 3 July 1939, although they did not stop at Highgate until later.

=== Wartime ===
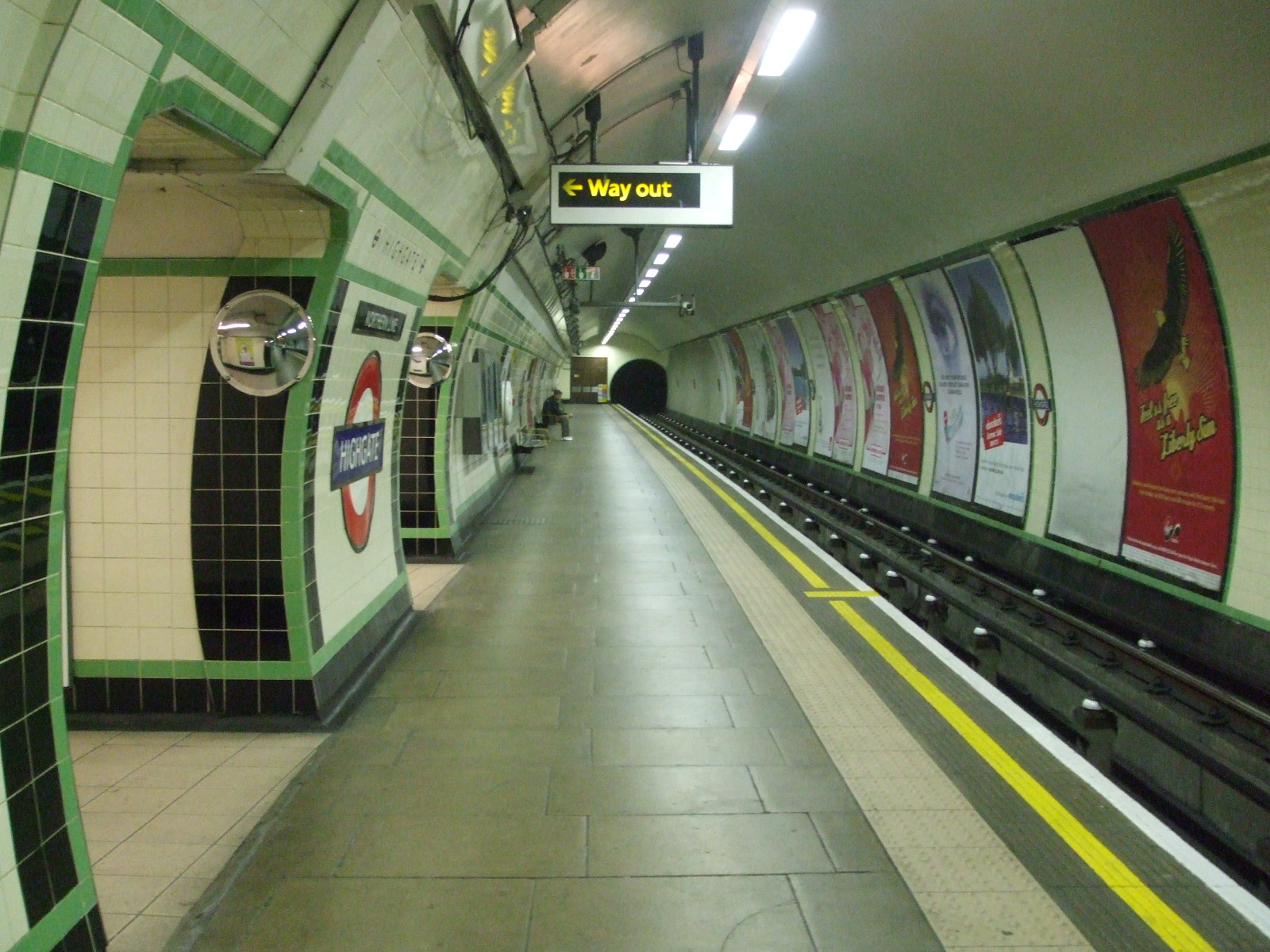
One of the extra-long platforms constructed for, but never used by, nine-car trains

Following the outbreak of the Second World War in September 1939, works to complete the electrification of the LNER lines were slowed or halted. The line from Finchley Central to Edgware closed for reconstruction on 11 September 1939. (Note: The section from Finchley Central to Mill Hill East was completed and reopened on 18 May 1941 to serve the nearby Inglis Barracks.) Northern line services were extended from East Finchley to High Barnet on 14 April 1940 and started serving the deep level platforms at Highgate on 19 January 1941, though not all of the new station buildings had been completed. The surface platforms at Highgate continued to be served by LNER steam trains.

The deep-level platforms were constructed 490 feet (150 m) long to accommodate extra-long nine-car trains, which were planned for services on the Northern line but never served Highgate, having been withdrawn at the start of the war. (Note: Tube trains at this time were typically six or seven cars long. A nine-car train began operating as an experiment on 8 November 1937 between Colindale and Kennington.)

By the end of February 1938, four nine-car trains were operating between Edgware and Kennington. Platforms at Edgware, Burnt Oak, Colindale, Hendon Central, Brent Cross and Golders Green were extended to accommodate the longer trains. At other stations on the Charing Cross branch, the last two or first two cars remained in the tunnel. The platforms at Highgate were the only deep-level platforms constructed, though longer platforms were provided on some surface stations. With the interchange between LNER and Northern line services available at Highgate from January 1941, LNER trains to East Finchley ended on 2 March 1941, after which they operated between Finsbury Park and Alexandra Palace only. (Note: As the connection between the LNER tracks and the new Northern line tracks was to the north-west of the junction for the Alexandra Palace branch, the branch could only be served by trains running to and from Finsbury Park.)

In 1942, LNER services through Highgate were reduced to rush hour only operations. During the war, the deep-level platforms at Highgate were used as a shelter from the bombing of London by the Luftwaffe and, later, V-1 and V-2 missiles.

=== Post-war ===
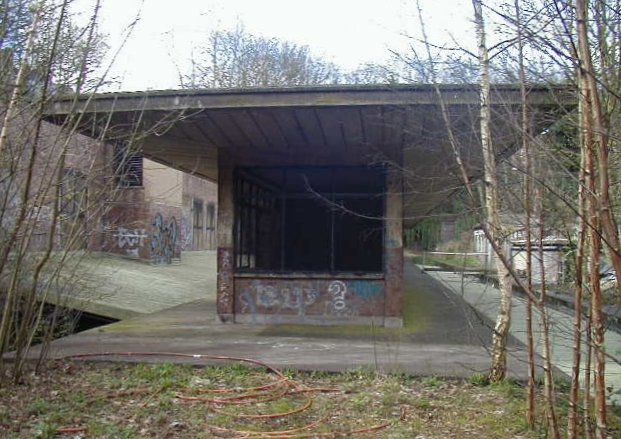
Platform building constructed for the Northern line

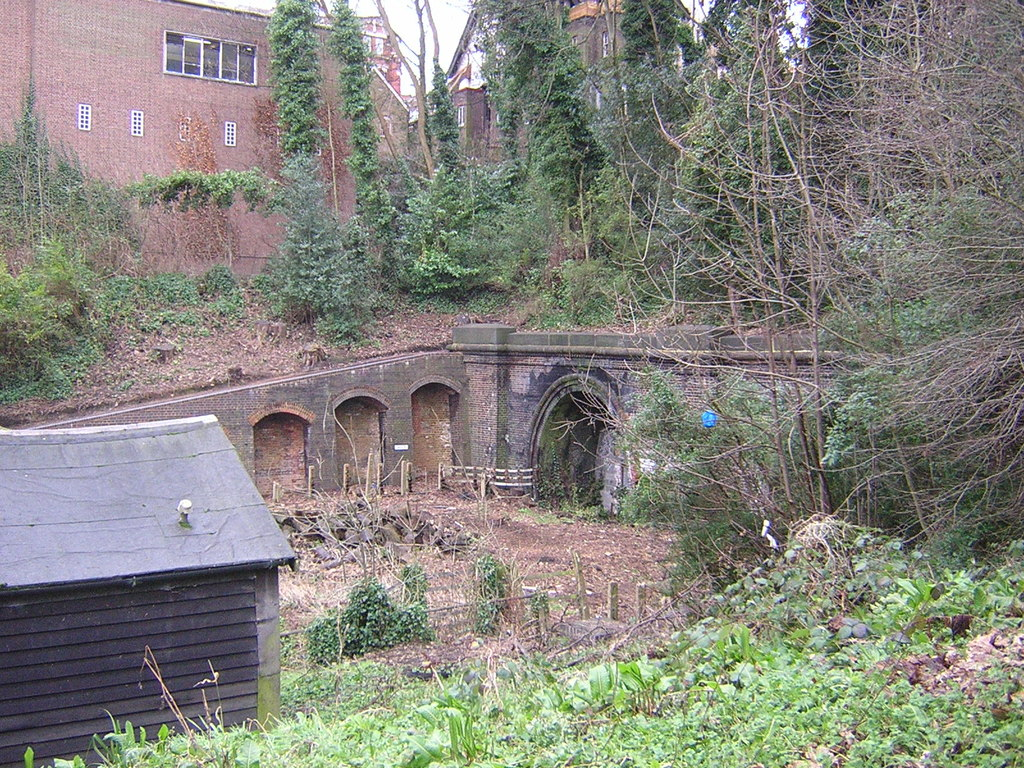
North end of the station cutting with tunnel portals. The red brick building in the background houses the exit at the top of the cutting.

Disused surface station

After the war, plans to complete the Northern Heights project were reviewed. In early 1946, the conversion of the LNER line from Mill Hill East to Edgware was scheduled by the LPTB for completion between January 1947 and June 1948. No work was carried out as maintenance works and reconstruction of war damage on the existing network had the greatest call on London Underground funds. Funds for new works were severely limited and priority was given to the completion of the western and eastern extensions of the Central line to West Ruislip, Epping and Hainault.

Despite being shown as under construction on Underground maps as late as 1950, (Note: Shown as under construction, the Northern Heights extensions appeared for the first time on Underground poster maps in 1937 and pocket maps in 1938.) After the opening of the tube platforms at Highgate, and the extensions to High Barnet and Mill Hill East, the uncompleted remainder of the works were removed from the map between 1943 and 1945.

The Mill Hill East to Edgware and Edgware to Bushey Heath sections appeared on the map again from 1946 to 1949 and the Finsbury Park to Alexandra Palace section appeared from 1946 to 1950; work never restarted on the unimplemented parts of the Northern Heights project. (Note: The section of the extension between Brockley Hill and Bushey Heath was cancelled in October 1950, leaving the section between Edgware and Brockley Hill, and the conversion of the line from Mill Hill East to Edgware, to be decided. The announcement of its cancellation was finally made in February 1954.)

After a temporary closure between October 1951 and January 1952, British Railways (Note: The successor to the LNER on this route.) operated the last passenger services between Finsbury Park and Alexandra Palace on 3 July 1954. Goods traffic continued to pass through the station until 1964. (Note: Goods trains continued on the Alexandra Palace branch until 1957, the High Barnet branch until 1962 and the Edgware branch until 1964.) The line continued to be used for occasional London Underground rolling stock transfers between Highgate depot and the Northern City line, with the stock being pulled over the unelectrified lines by battery locomotives. This ceased in 1970, due to the poor condition of some of the intermediate bridges, and the track was lifted through the surface platforms in 1972.

Completion of the station buildings was delayed for many years. Designed by the architect Charles Holden, the pre-war plans included a large entrance building at the top of the hill next to The Woodman public house with a pair of escalators between the entrance and the sub-surface concourse. These were to be enclosed in an inclined structure down the side of the cutting parallel with the surface tracks. Taking inspiration from the local legend, the building would have been topped by a statue of Dick Whittington and his cat. (Note: Taking inspiration from local history, Charles Holden commissioned the sculptor Eric Aumonier to provide The Archer sculpture at East Finchley, and planned a sculpture of a Roman centurion at the unbuilt Elstree South.) When works were finished in 1957, a single and upwards only escalator was provided to take passengers from the sub-surface ticket hall up to a simple exit at the top of the cutting.

One of the GNR's station buildings remains on the north side of the surface platforms; it is used as a private residence. Much of the route between Finsbury Park and Alexandra Palace now forms part of the Parkland Walk, although this bypasses the station site for safety reasons.

On 2 May 2023, a fire broke out in the ground-level station.

== Layout and facilities ==
The current station consists of a central subterranean ticket hall, with escalators leading down to two separate nine-car long platforms. The stairs to the closed surface platforms have been blocked off from the public areas of the station by a staff room.

There are two entrances to the station: one leading to Priory Gardens to the east and Archway Road to the south. This entrance is directly opposite the Jacksons Lane art venue. There is also a one-way escalator leading to a simple exit north of the station.

The station has a car park, payphones, wi-fi and an Asda click and collect service.

== Services ==
Service frequencies at Highgate station vary during the day, but operate generally every 3–7 minutes:

- Northbound: between 05:59 and 00:59
- Southbound: between 05:37 and 00:15.

Current services
Preceding station	London Underground	Following station
East Finchley towards High Barnet or Mill Hill East	Northern line High Barnet branch	Archway towards Battersea Power Station, Morden or Kennington
Former services
Cranley Gardens; Line and station closed	British Railways (Eastern Region); Edgware, Highgate and London Railway	Crouch End; Line and station closed
East Finchley; Line closed, station open	British Railways (Eastern Region); Edgware, Highgate and London Railway	Crouch End; Line and station closed
Abandoned Northern Heights extension
Preceding station	London Underground	Following station
Cranley Gardens towards Alexandra Palace	Northern line	Crouch End via Northern City Line towards Moorgate

== Onward connections ==
London Bus routes 43, 134 and 234 serve the station, along with night bus route N20.

== In popular culture ==
The disused platforms and tunnels have been used for filming, appearing in several productions including the feature film Paperhouse and the television series Waking the Dead.

British-American broadcaster and politician Jerry Springer, best known for hosting his eponymous talk show from 1991 to 2018, was born at Highgate tube station in February 1944 during a Luftwaffe bombing raid.
