= Alexandra Park railway station =

Alexandra Park railway station may refer to:

- Alexandra Palace railway station in North London, named Wood Green (Alexandra Park) between 1 June 1864 and 18 March 1871
- Alexandra Palace railway station (1873–1954) in North London, named Alexandra Park between March 1891 and April 1892
- Alexandra Parade railway station in Glasgow, originally named Alexandra Park and renamed on 9 July 1923
- Muswell Hill railway station in North London, originally named Alexandra Park (Muswell Hill) and renamed on 1 May 1875
- Wilbraham Road railway station in Manchester, originally named Alexandra Park and renamed on 1 July 1923
