= Muswell Hill railway station =

Former railway station in north London, England

Muswell Hill
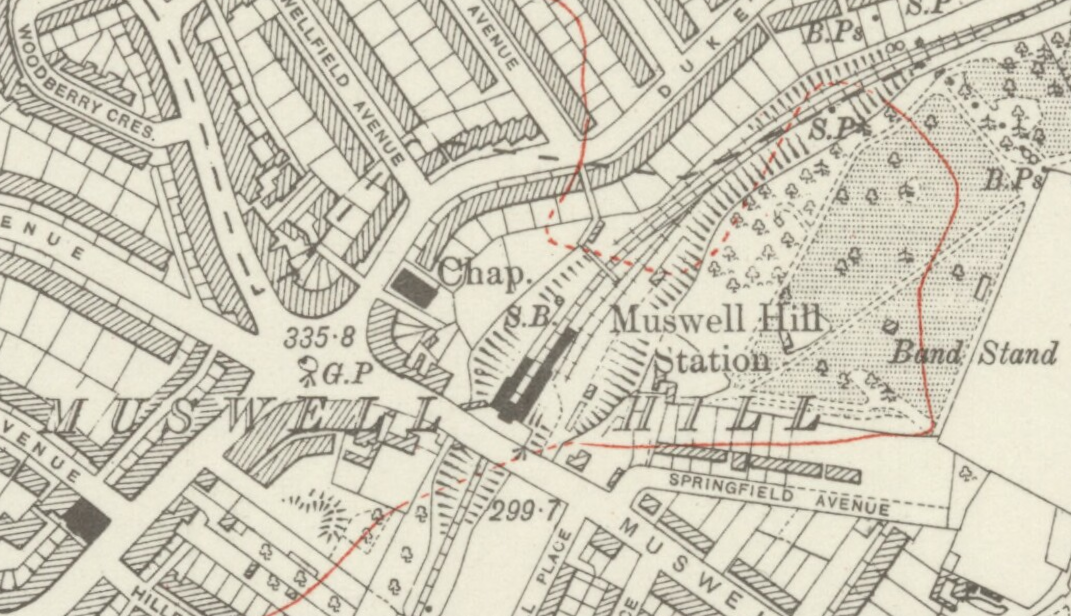
- Muswell Hill station on a 1920 map

- Location of Muswell Hill in Greater London
- Location: Muswell Hill
- Local authority: Haringey
- Number of platforms: 2

Railway companies
- Original company: Muswell Hill Railway
- Pre-grouping: Great Northern Railway
- Post-grouping: London and North Eastern Railway

Key dates
- 1873: Opened (MHR)
- 1873: Closed (MHR)
- 1875: Reopened (MHR)
- 1951: Closed (BR)
- 1952: Reopened (BR)
- 1954: Closed (passengers) (BR)
- 1956: Closed (goods) (BR)

Other information
- Coordinates: 51.5909°N 0.1406°W

Muswell Hill railway station served the district of Muswell Hill, in north London, England, between 1873 and 1956. It was located just north of the junction of Muswell Hill and Muswell Hill Place; nothing remains of the station today and Muswell Hill Primary School now occupies its former site. In the 1930s, plans were made to electrify the line and transfer the main line service to London Underground's Northern line, but these were abandoned after the Second World War.

== History ==
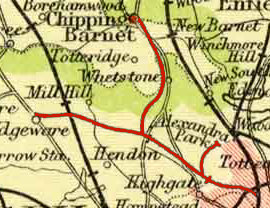
Great Northern Railway's Northern Heights branches, 1900

The Muswell Hill Railway (MHR) opened the station on 24 May 1873 as Alexandra Park (Muswell Hill). It was the intermediate station on the MHR's branch line from the Great Northern Railway's (GNR) station at Highgate to Alexandra Palace. The line was constructed to bring passengers to Alexandra Palace and the branch line opened at the same time as the palace. Following a fire at the palace, the line was closed from 1 August 1873 to 1 May 1875, with the station being given its final name when reopened. The other intermediate station on the line, Cranley Gardens, did not open until 1902. In 1911, the line was taken over by the GNR. After the Railways Act 1921 created the Big Four railway companies, the line became part of the London & North Eastern Railway (LNER) from 1923.

In 1935, London Transport planned, as part of its Northern Heights plan, to take over the line from LNER together with their routes from Finsbury Park to Edgware and High Barnet. The line was to be modernised to use electric trains and amalgamated with the Northern line. At Finsbury Park, the line was to be connected to the Northern line's City branch, so that services from Muswell Hill would have continued to Moorgate.

Advanced works modernising the track began in the late 1930s, which were interrupted by the Second World War. Works were completed from Highgate to High Barnet and Mill Hill East with that section incorporated into the Northern line. Works on the tracks between Finsbury Park and Alexandra Palace were halted, with the LNER continuing to operate the line. In 1942, it was reduced to rush hour only operations because of wartime economies.

After the war, no work was undertaken as maintenance works and reconstruction of war damage on the existing network had the greatest call on LPTB funds. Funds for new works were severely limited with priority given to the completion of the western and eastern extensions of the Central line to West Ruislip, Epping and Hainault. Despite being shown as under construction on underground maps as late as 1950, (Note: Shown as "under construction", the Northern Heights extensions appeared for the first time on Underground poster maps in 1937 and pocket maps in 1938. After the opening of the tube platforms at Highgate and the extensions to High Barnet and Mill Hill East, the uncompleted remainder of the works were removed from the map between 1943 and 1945. The Mill Hill East-Edgware-Bushey Heath sections appeared on the map again from 1946 to 1949. The Finsbury Park to Alexandra Palace section appeared from 1946 to 1950.) work never restarted on the unimplemented parts of the Northern Heights plan.

British Railways (the successor to the LNER) closed the line temporarily from 29 October 1951 until 7 January 1952, before the last passenger services between Finsbury Park and Alexandra Palace ran on 3 July 1954. The line continued to be used for goods services until 14 June 1956, when it was closed completely. The track was removed with platforms and station buildings demolished.

Disused railways
Alexandra Palace; Line and station closed	British Railways (Eastern Region); Edgware, Highgate and London Railway	Cranley Gardens; Line and station closed
Abandoned Northern Heights extension
Preceding station	London Underground	Following station
Alexandra Palace Terminus	Northern line	Cranley Gardens towards Moorgate

== The site today ==
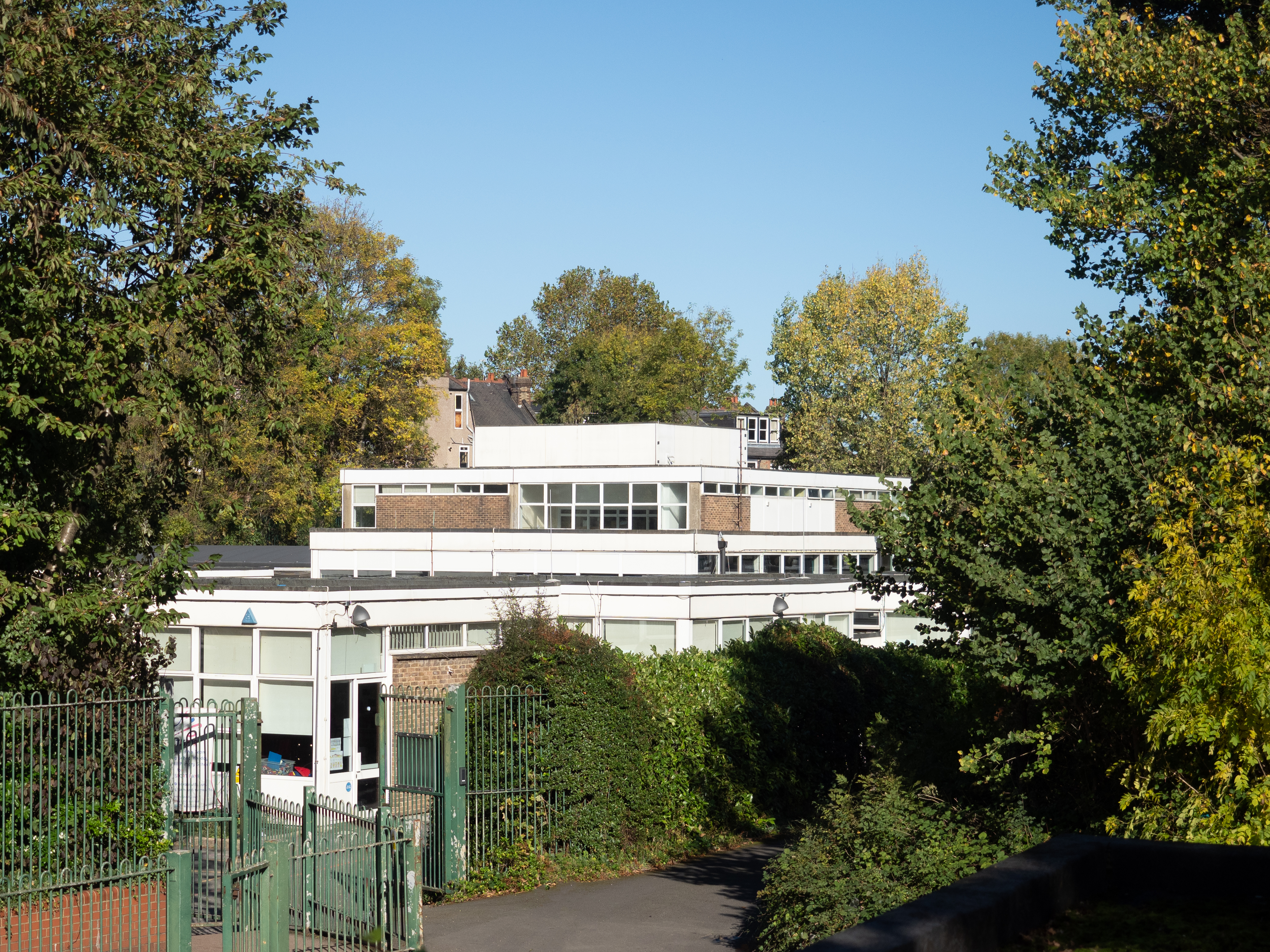
Muswell Hill Primary School now stands on the station's former site

Most of the trackbed between Muswell Hill and Finsbury Park is now a rail trail, the Parkland Walk.

== See also ==
- Edgware, Highgate and London Railway
