= Copthall Railway Walk and Copthall Old Common =

Nature reserve and abandoned railway in the London Borough of Barnet

Coordinates: 51.6073°N 0.2235°W

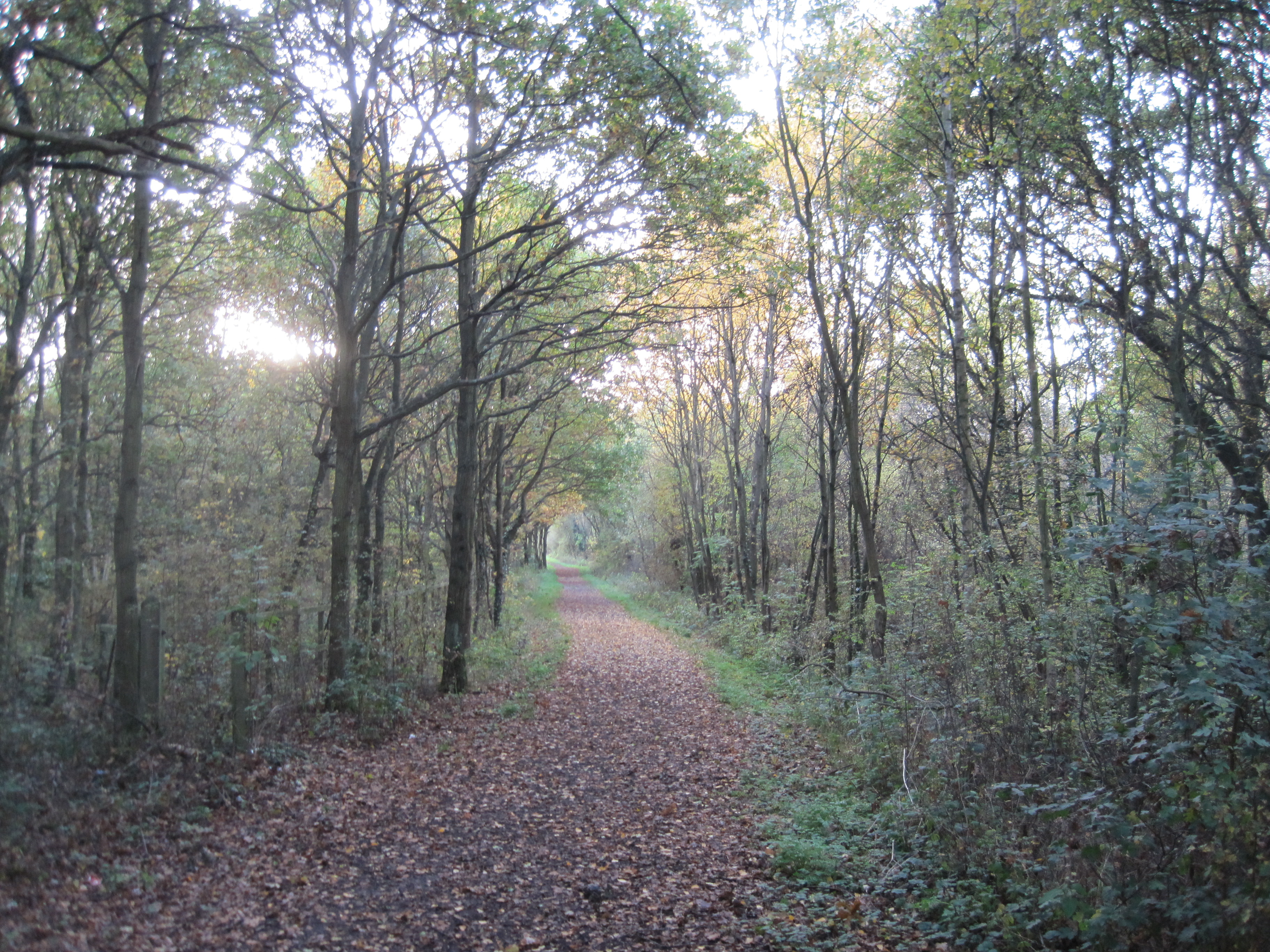
Path in Copthall Old Common

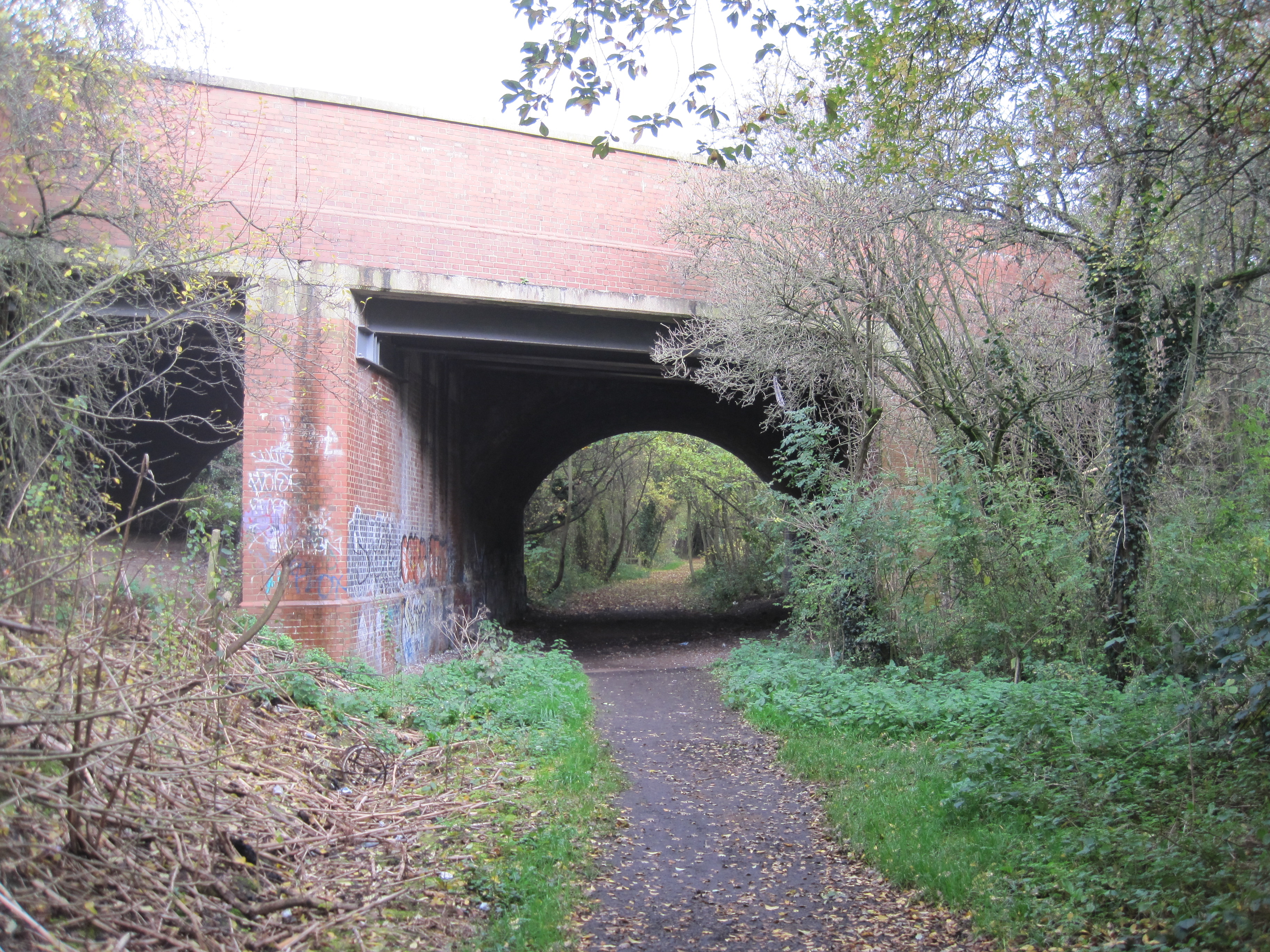
Bridge over Copthall Railway Walk

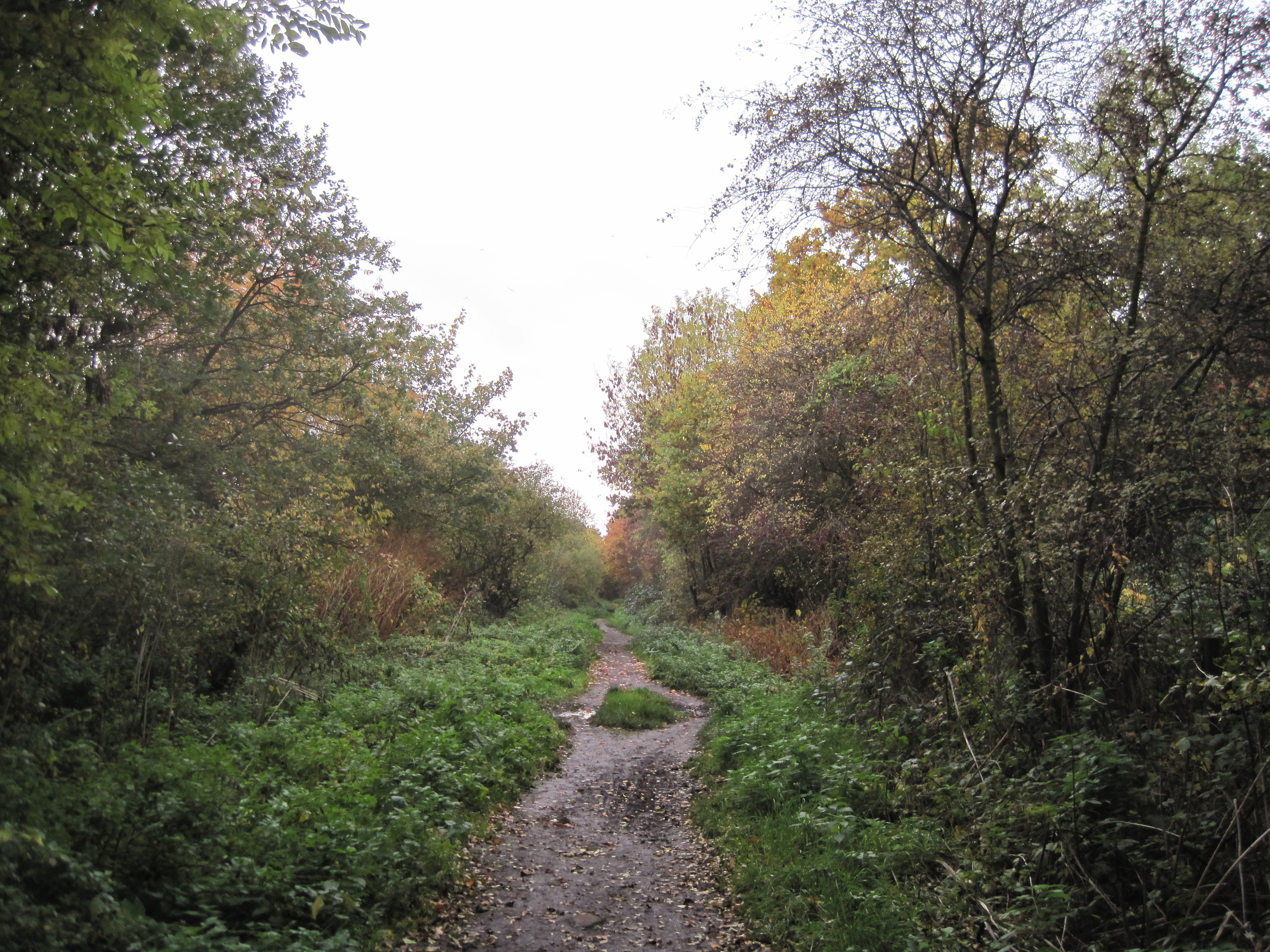
Copthall Railway Walk

Copthall Railway Walk and Copthall Old Common is a 9-hectare (22-acre) Site of Borough Importance for Nature Conservation, Grade II, in Mill Hill in the London Borough of Barnet.

Copthall Railway Walk is a section just under a mile long of the Mill Hill East to Edgware line, closed in 1964, of the Edgware, Highgate and London Railway. It starts at a bridge under Sanders Lane, near Bittacy Hill, and passes another bridge under Sanders Lane near Bittacy Rise, finishing at Page Street. Copthall Old Common is south of the central section of the Railway Walk. To the south of the common is a green lane which goes by a public footpath through allotments to the Great North Way.

The reserve is mainly woodland, with some scrub and rough grassland. The woodland is dominated by sycamore, oak and silver birch. The site has a good range of common birds and the rare and declining glow worm. The Common has some fine old oaks, and bluebells in the hedge bottom.

== See also ==
- Nature reserves in Barnet
