= Mill Hill Old Railway Nature Reserve =

Nature reserve in the London Borough of Barnet

Coordinates: 51.6124°N 0.2566°W

Mill Hill Old Railway Nature Reserve is a 2.3-hectare (5.7-acre) Site of Borough Importance for Nature Conservation, Grade II, in Mill Hill in the London Borough of Barnet.

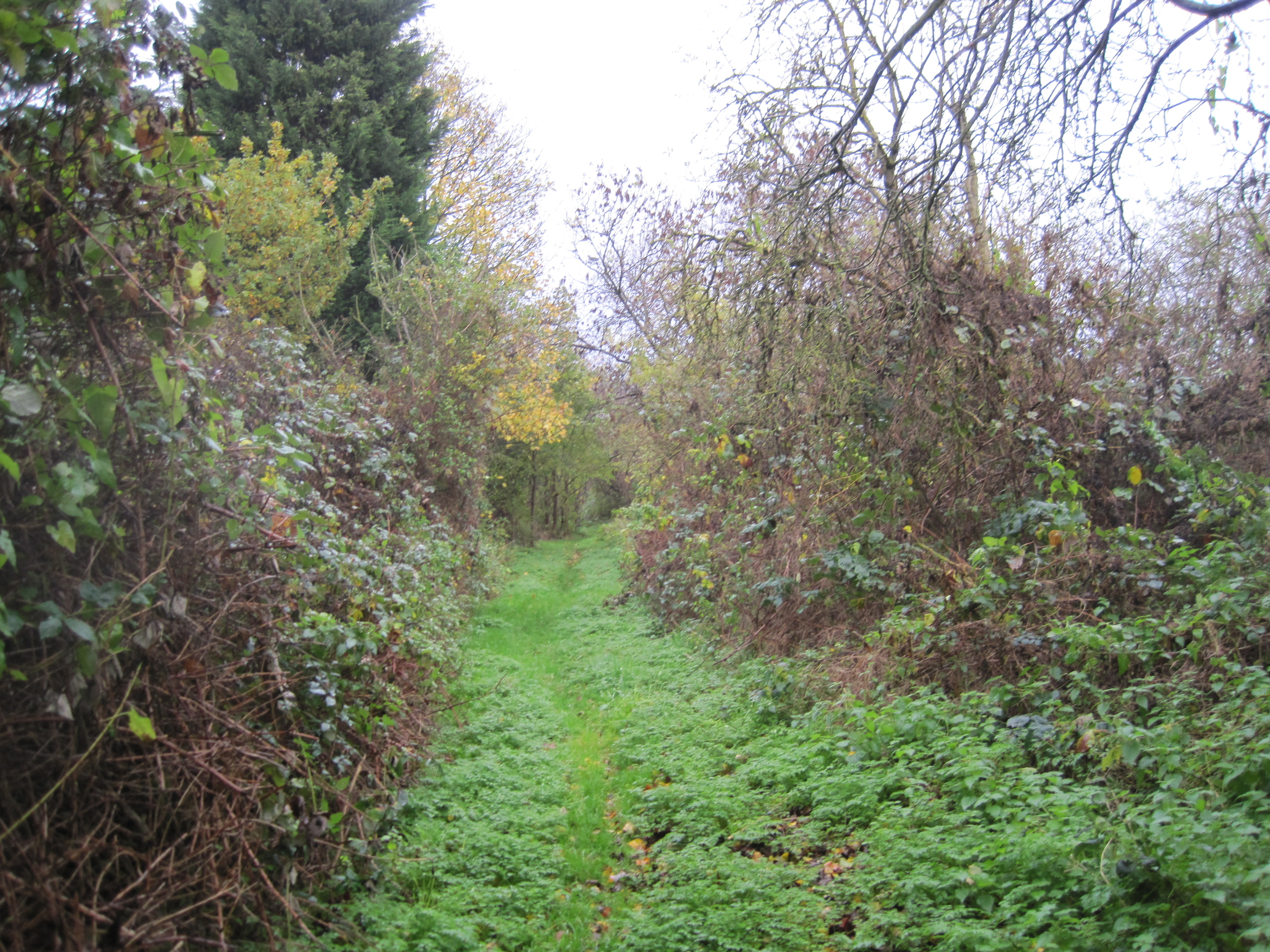

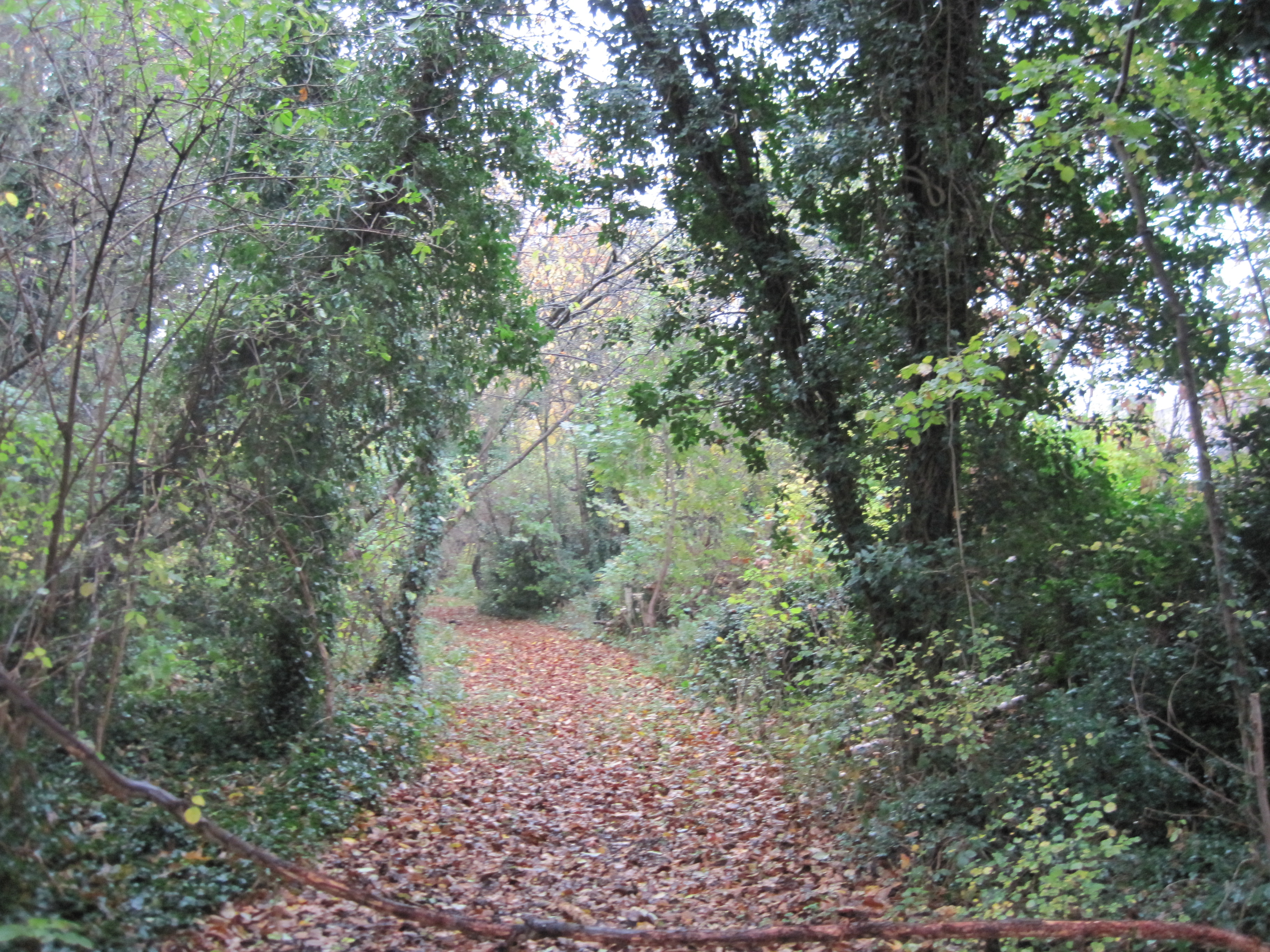

The reserve follows the route of the Highgate to Edgware line, closed in 1964, of the Edgware, Highgate and London Railway, between Deans Lane and Bunns Lane.

Most of it, between Deans Lane and a short footpath from The Meads, is a closed site owned by the London Borough of Barnet and formerly managed by the London Wildlife Trust. It is open from 10am to 4pm on Saturdays and Sundays. The remaining stretch to Bunns Lane borders Lyndhurst Park. This is not managed and is very overgrown.

The reserve is wooded, with some areas of rough pasture and herbs, and is an important habitat for slowworms. The grassland has a variety of wild flowers including burnet saxifrage and the rare great burnet.

The mosaic of gardens backing onto the reserve provides a good habitat for suburban birds, including sparrowhawk, green and great spotted woodpeckers, long-tailed tit, chiffchaff and blackcap.

Butterflies, moths and other invertebrates such as orange-tip, small copper and hoverflies are common.

== See also ==
- Nature reserves in Barnet
