= Vincent Raymond Kenny =

British Army postal administrator (1882–1966)

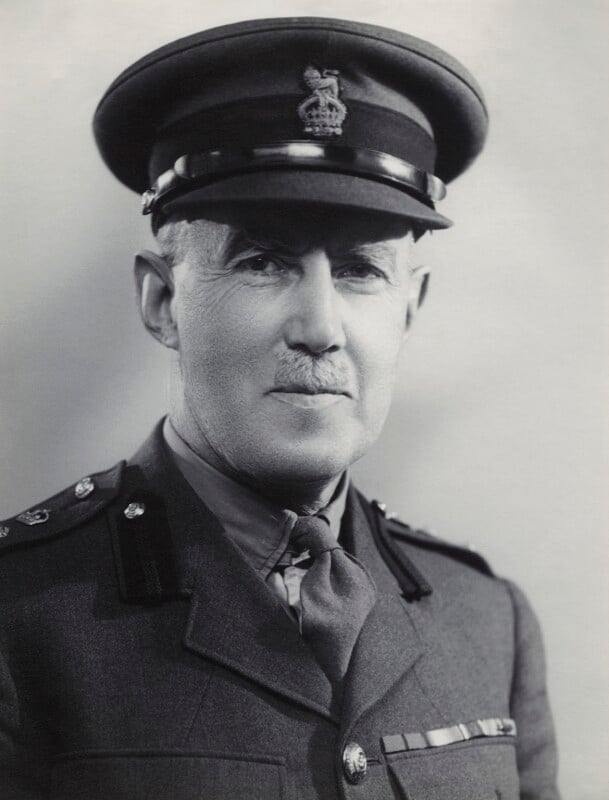
Kenny in 1942

Brigadier Vincent Raymond Kenny CB MBE (21 February 1882 – 3 December 1966) was Director of Army Postal Services from 1941 to 1943 who introduced the Airgraph system to improve postal communications between Britain and the Middle East.

== History ==
He was born on 21 February 1882, the son of William John Kenny (1849–1901) and Angela Gertrude Sheridan (1852–1937).

He was educated at Blackrock College, Dublin, and the Royal University of Ireland. He studied law at Trinity College Dublin and the King's Inns and was called to the Bar in 1911. He entered the Civil Service as a clerk in Dublin and moved to England in 1912.

During the First World War he was granted a commission in the Royal Engineers and served in Gallipoli and Salonika and was mentioned 3 times in dispatches. He was awarded the MBE.

He married firstly Kathleen Murphy (1888–1919) in 1918 in Rathdown. She died during the Influenza epidemic in 1919. He married secondly Margaret Barton (1890–1966) in 1925 in Chorley, Lancashire.

He was assistant surveyor at Preston until in 1931 he was made Postmaster of Nottingham. In 1933 he moved to Leeds as Postmaster Surveyor, and was made North Western Regional Director in 1938.

In 1941 he was promoted to the rank of Brigadier and was Director Army Postal Services from 1941 to 1943. Kenny Road in Inglis Barracks was named after him. During his time as Director of Army Postal Service he introduced the Airgraph service of film letters to deliver mail more quickly to soldiers serving in the Middle East. Traditional mail was carried by ship through the Mediterranean by the Royal Navy but opportunities to do this were limited and there was a long transit time which resulted in complaints. The Airgraph used the Kodak microfilm (Recordak) system. Letters were photographed, and the negatives sent by air transport.

In 1944 he was made C.B. (Military Division).

He died on 3 December 1966 and left an estate valued at £29,119 (equivalent to £685,100 in 2023).
