= Inglis Barracks =

Military installation in London

- Mill Hill
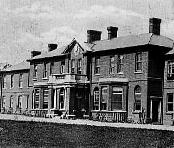
- Officers Mess at Inglis Barracks in 1910

Site information
- Type: Barracks
- Owner: Ministry of Defence
- Operator: British Army

Location
- Location within London
- Coordinates: 51.61305°N 0.21267°W

Site history
- Built: 1904
- Built for: War Office
- In use: 1905-2007

Garrison information
- Garrison: London District
- Occupants: Middlesex Regiment (1905-62) Royal Electrical and Mechanical Engineers (30 Command Workshop) (1943-90s) Royal Engineers (Postal Section/Postal & Courier Communications/Postal & Courier Services) (1950s-93) Women's Royal Army Corps (1960's-93) Royal Logistic Corps (Postal & Courier Services) (1993-2007)

Inglis Barracks was a military installation in Mill Hill, London, NW7. It was also referred to as Mill Hill Barracks. The site has been redeveloped and now contains a variety of modern housing.

== History ==
=== Early history ===
Mill Hill Barracks, a set of red brick buildings designed by the architect Harry Bell Measures CBE MVO (1862–1940), was built in 1904 on the site of Bittacy farm. The site was roughly triangular in shape bounded by Partingdale Lane to the north, Frith Lane to the east and Bittacy Hill to the west. It was a short walk up the hill from Mill Hill East tube station. The rail service was originally built by the Edgware, Highgate and London Railway (EH&LR) and had been opened as Mill Hill by the Great Northern Railway (GNR).

The barracks became the Regimental Depot for the Middlesex Regiment (Duke of Cambridge's Own) when they moved from the Hounslow Barracks following the opening of the barracks. Twenty-five years later, the barracks were renamed after Lieutenant-General Sir William Inglis, who had commanded the 57th (West Middlesex) Regiment of Foot during the Battle of Albuera, one of the bloodiest battles of the Peninsular War (1809–14), fought on 16 May 1811.

All of the recruits for the Middlesex Regiment were processed through the Regimental Depot at Mill Hill during the First World War. The barracks ceased to be the home of the Middlesex Regiment when that regiment merged with three other regiments to form the Queen's Regiment at Howe Barracks in Canterbury in 1966.

=== Second World War ===
30 Command Workshop Royal Electrical and Mechanical Engineers moved onto the site in 1943 during the Second World War.

=== Postwar ===
On 31 October 1962, shortly after the occupation of the barracks by Home Postal Depot RE, Mary, Princess Royal and Countess of Harewood, as the Controller Commandant Women's Royal Army Corps (WRAC) laid the foundation stone for extra barrack blocks to be built within the site to accommodate 12 Company, WRAC.

On 16 July 1982 Queen Elizabeth II visited the Depot (or the Postal & Courier Depot as it was then styled) as part of the RE (Postal & Courier Services) centenary celebrations. To mark the centenary Barnet Borough granted the Depot the Freedom of the Borough.

=== IRA bomb ===
The Provisional Irish Republican Army planted a bomb in one of the barracks blocks (Block B); its explosion in the early hours of 1 August 1988 killed Lance Corporal MJF Robbins and injured nine other soldiers of the Royal Engineers. The two-storey building containing the single men's quarters was completely destroyed. The Prime Minister, Margaret Thatcher, subsequently met officers to offer her condolences as the barracks bordered her then Parliamentary constituency.

In April 1993 the responsibility for the processing of the armed services mails addressed to HM Ships and British Forces Post Office (BFPO) addresses was transferred from the Royal Engineers to the newly formed Royal Logistics Corps. To mark the occasion a parade was held at the barracks. The Chief Royal Engineer General Sir George Cooper inspected the troops and took the salute.

The British Forces Post Office (the successors of the Home Postal Depot RE) left the site and moved to RAF Northolt in 2007.

=== Buildings ===
The original barrack installation constituted two accommodation blocks, an officers mess, a small church and various out-buildings. Other buildings were added over the years, particularly in the 1960/70s, to accommodate the growing establishment and changing use. The military presence at the barracks ceased in 2007 and Ministry of Defence sold the site for residential development as part of Project MoDEL in 2012. The estate is now called ′Millbrook Park′.

== Road names ==
In the 1970s the road names within the barracks complex reflected the presence of the RE (Postal & Courier Services).

Road Name	Referring to:
Charles Sevright Drive	Charles Sevright - Army Postmaster, San Sebastian, Spain (1814)
Curry Rise	RSM GH Curry RE - RSM Home Postal Depot, Royal Engineers (1939-?)
Drew Avenue	Brigadier JN Drew, CBE – Director Army Postal Services (DAPS) (1960–70)
Gawthorne Avenue	Major EE Gawthorne, OBE, DCM, RE – Assistant Director Army Postal Services, British Army of The Rhine (BAOR) (1920–29)
Henry Darlot Drive	Henry Darlot - Army Postmaster to Duke of York, Helder Expedition, Holland (1799)
Holmes Avenue	Brigadier Kenneth S Holmes, CB, CBE - Director Army Postal Services (1950–59)
Kenny Road	Brigadier VR Kenny, CB, MBE – Director Army Postal Services (1941–42)
Lidbury Road	Colonel Sir David J Lidbury, KCMG, CB, DSO – Director Army Postal Services (1921–35)
Price Close	Brigadier-General William Price, CB, CMG, CBE, VD – Director Army Postal Services (1913–19)
Reading Way	Lieutenant Colonel AH Reading OBE – CO Home Postal Depot RE (1950s)
Roberts Road	Colonel WR Roberts, CBE – Deputy Director Army Postal Services 21 Army Group (1943–45)
Ross Avenue	Colonel D Ross – CO Home Postal Centre RE, Nottingham (1942–45)
Twinn Road	Brigadier FCG Twinn, CMG – Director Army Postal Services (1939–41)
Warren Way	Colonel Peter Warren, CMG, CBE – Director Army Postal Services (1920–21)
Williamson Way	Brigadier-General Sir Fredrick H Williamson, CB, CBE – Director Army Postal Services (Home) (1915–20)
Maurice Browne Close	Colonel Maurice Browne MC - Colonel Middlesex Regiment (1942–52)

On 30 July 2018 one of the roads on the Millbrook Park development was named "Michael Robbins Way" in honour of the death of Corporal MJF Robbins on 1 August 1988 in the IRA bombing of B Block.

== Memorials ==
Outside the Officers Mess there stood the Middlesex Regiment's memorial, but that has since been moved to Mill Hill village near to Mill Hill School. The memorial was unveiled at 2.30pm on 4 November 1922, by The Prince of Wales (the late Duke of Windsor).

Sixty years later the Duke of Windsor's niece, The Queen, unveiled a life-size statue entitled Letter from Home, which stood outside the Guard Room, on her visit to the barracks in 1982. The statue was moved to RAF Northolt when the barracks were vacated by the British Forces Post Office (the successors of the Home Postal Depot RE) in 2007.

The statue depicts a First World War soldier (a 'Tommy') reading a letter and is a replica of the statue by sculptor Charles Sargeant Jagger (1885-1934) which stands on Platform 1 at Paddington Station, London. The statue was simply called Soldier Reading a Letter and was erected as a memorial to the men and women of the Great Western Railway who lost their lives during the First and Second World Wars.
