= Alexandra Palace railway station (1873–1954) =

Disused railway station in north London, England

Alexandra Palace
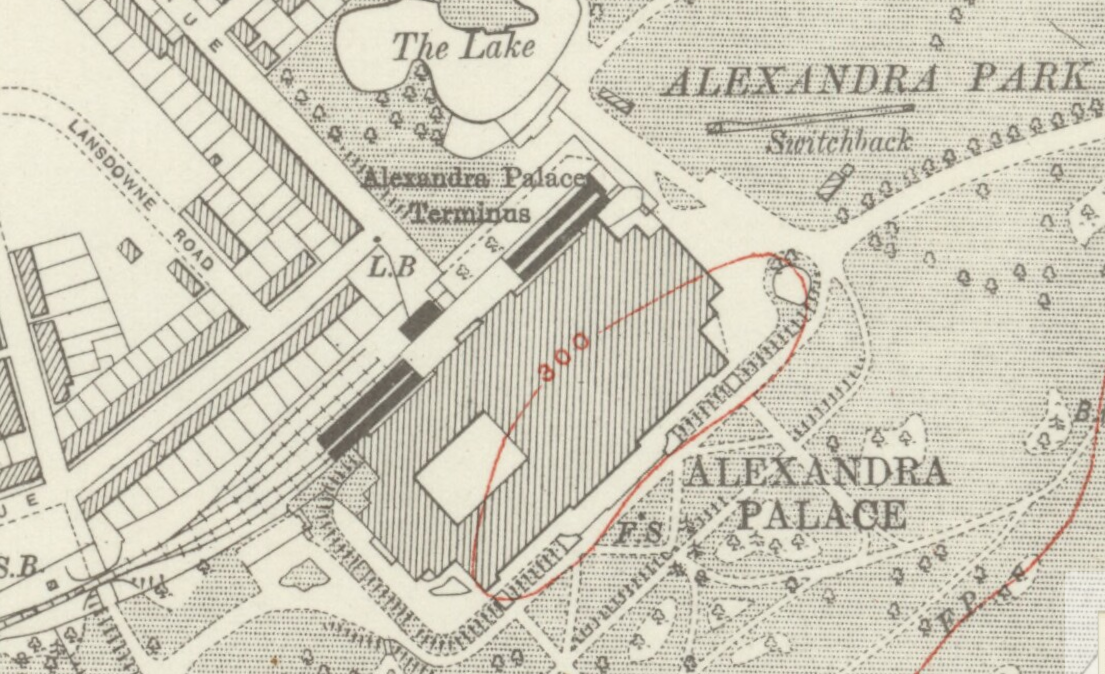
- The station on a 1920 map
- Interactive map of Alexandra Palace

General information
- Location: Alexandra Palace
- Local authority: Haringey
- Number of platforms: 2

Railway companies
- Original company: Muswell Hill Estate Company
- Pre-grouping: Great Northern Railway
- Post-grouping: London and North Eastern Railway

Key dates
- 24 May 1873: Opened
- 1 August 1873: Closed
- 1 May 1875: Reopened
- August 1882: Closed
- March 1885: Reopened
- September 1885: Closed
- May 1889: Reopened
- approx. 1890: Closed
- March 1891: Reopened and renamed Alexandra Park
- 1898: Renamed Alexandra Palace
- 29 October 1951: Closed
- 7 January 1952: Reopened
- 5 July 1954: Closed permanently

Other information
- Coordinates: 51.5948°N 0.1320°W

Alexandra Palace railway station served the area around Alexandra Palace, in the Muswell Hill district of north London, England, between 1873 and 1954. It is one of a number of stations to have held the name at various times; it is situated to the west of the current Alexandra Palace station, formerly known as Wood Green, which lies on the East Coast Main Line. The former station was the terminus of a short branch line from Highgate; the preceding station on the branch was Muswell Hill. The station was located immediately adjacent to the north side of the Palace buildings.

== History ==
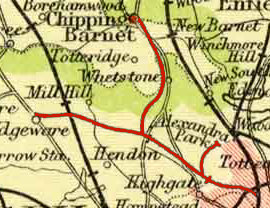
Edgware Highgate & London Railway, 1900

The station was built by the Muswell Hill Railway (MHR) and opened on 24 May 1873, along with the palace. However, when the palace burned down only two weeks after opening, the railway service was considerably reduced; from 1 August 1873, it was stopped for almost two years whilst the palace was rebuilt. The station reopened on 1 May 1875, but there were several further periods of temporary closure due to insufficient demand, including from August 1882 to March 1885, and September 1885 to May 1889.

When the station was reopened in March 1891, after another closure, it was renamed Alexandra Park in reference to the wider area rather than just the palace, in order to stoke higher demand. The increased demand did not materialise and the original Alexandra Palace name was restored in 1898.

In 1911, the line was taken over by the Great Northern Railway. After the Railways Act 1921 created the Big Four railway companies, the line became part of the London and North Eastern Railway (LNER) in 1923.

In 1935, as part of its New Works Programme, London Underground planned to take over the line from LNER together with their routes from Finsbury Park to Edgware and High Barnet, modernise it for use with electric trains and amalgamate it with the Northern line.

Works to modernise the track began in the late 1930s and were well advanced when they were interrupted and halted by the Second World War. Works were completed from Highgate to High Barnet and Mill Hill East and that section was incorporated into the Northern line. Further works on the section between Highgate and Alexandra Palace were postponed, and the line continued under the operation of the LNER. Services were reduced to rush hours only, due to wartime economy measures, so that the dwindling passenger numbers and a shortage of funds led to the cancellation of the unfinished works in 1950.

British Railways (the successor to the LNER) closed the line temporarily from 29 October 1951 until 7 January 1952; with dwindling passenger numbers, services to Alexandra Palace last operated on 3 July 1954, along with the rest of the line from Finsbury Park.

Disused railways
Terminus	British Railways (Eastern Region); Alexandra Palace Line	Muswell Hill
Abandoned Northern Heights extension
Preceding station	London Underground	Following station
Terminus	Northern line	Muswell Hill towards Moorgate

== The site today ==
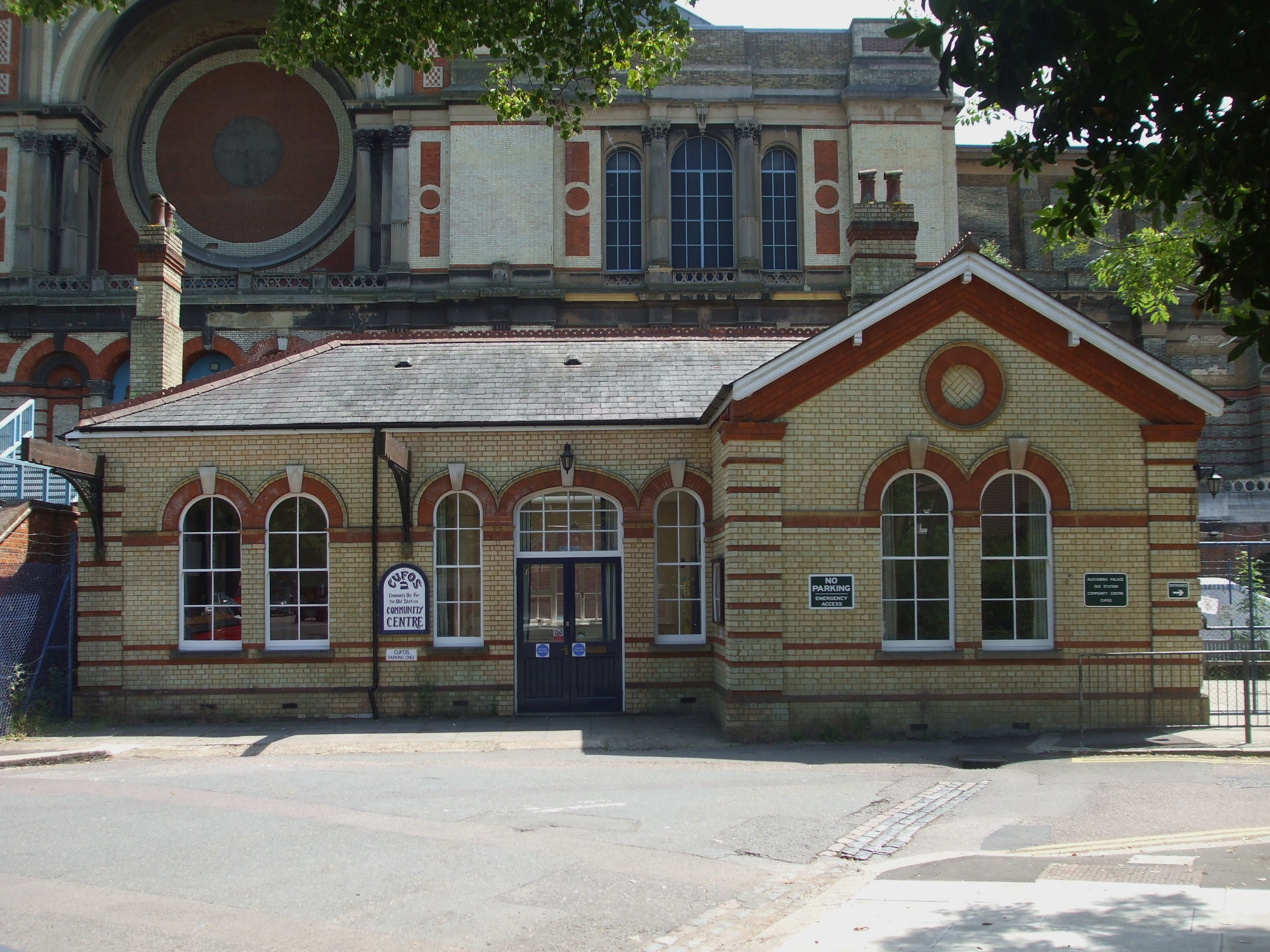
The station building

The small station building is extant and is in use as a community centre. Nothing remains of the tracks or island platform today, which have been removed and covered by a car park.

== See also ==
- Edgware, Highgate and London Railway
- Palace Gates railway station
