= Mill Hill East tube station =

London Underground station

Mill Hill East
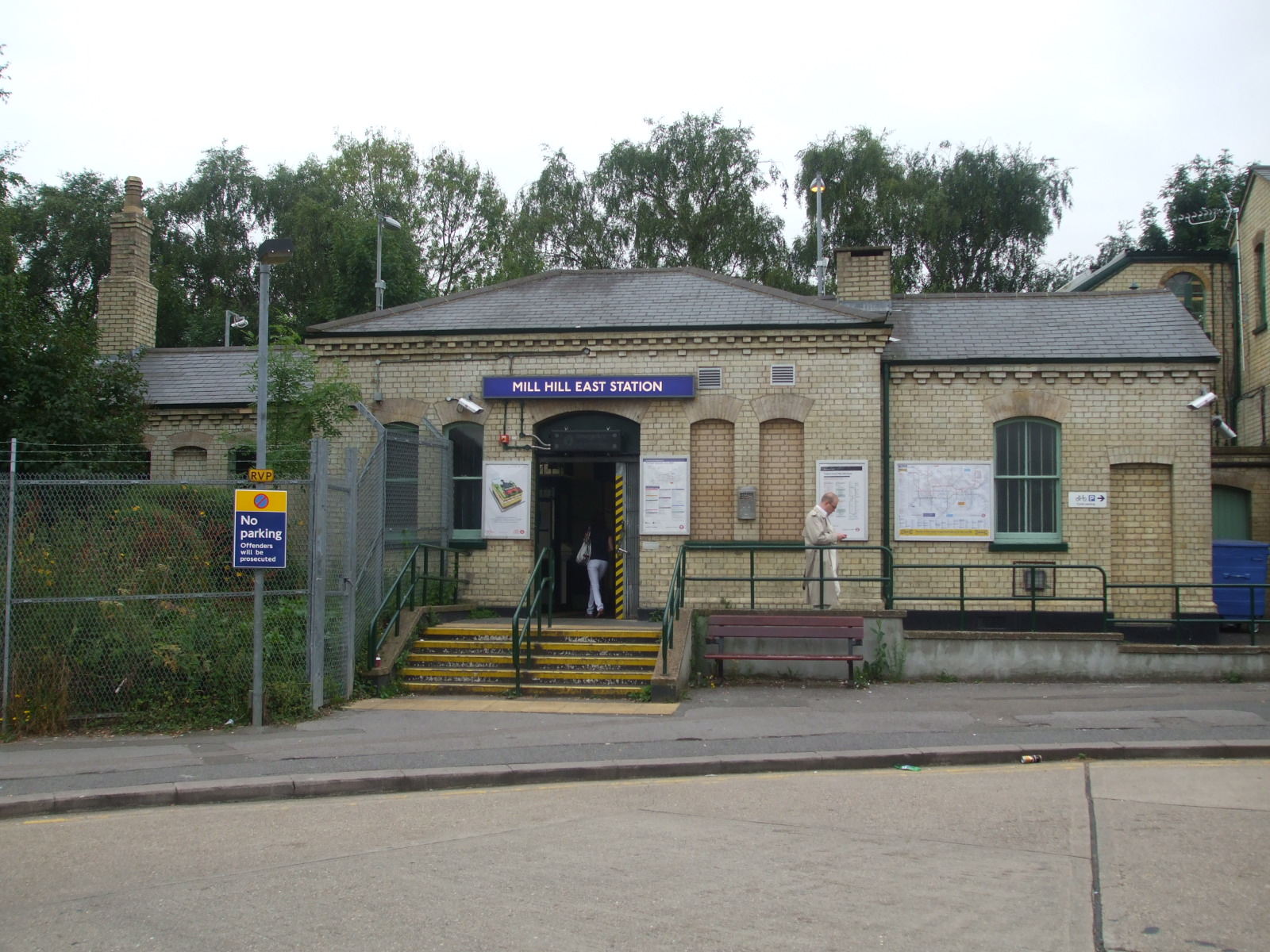
- Station entrance
- Interactive map of Mill Hill East

General information
- Location: Mill Hill
- Local authority: London Borough of Barnet
- Managed by: London Underground
- Number of platforms: 1
- Accessible: Yes
- Fare zone: 4

London Underground annual entry and exit
- 2021: ▼0.76 million
- 2022: ▲1.41 million
- 2023: ▲1.60 million
- 2024: ▼1.55 million
- 2025: ▲1.58 million

Railway companies
- Original company: Edgware, Highgate and London Railway
- Pre-grouping: Great Northern Railway
- Post-grouping: London and North Eastern Railway

Key dates
- 22 August 1867: Opened (GNR)
- 11 September 1939: Closed (LNER)
- 18 May 1941: Opened (Northern line)
- 1 October 1962: Goods yard closed

Other information
- External links: TfL station info page
- Coordinates: 51.60833°N 0.21028°W

Mill Hill East is a London Underground station, located in Mill Hill in the London Borough of Barnet, north London. It is the terminus and only station of a single-track branch of the Northern line to and from Finchley Central station in the High Barnet branch. The station is in London fare zone 4. It is the least used station on the Northern line with 1.62 million passengers in 2024.

The station was opened in 1867 as part of the Great Northern Railway's line between Finsbury Park and Edgware stations. As part of London Underground's partially completed Northern Heights plan, main line passenger services ended in 1939 and Northern line trains started serving the station in 1941. The station was refurbished in 2007 with accessibility work completed in 2020.

== History ==
=== Main line ===
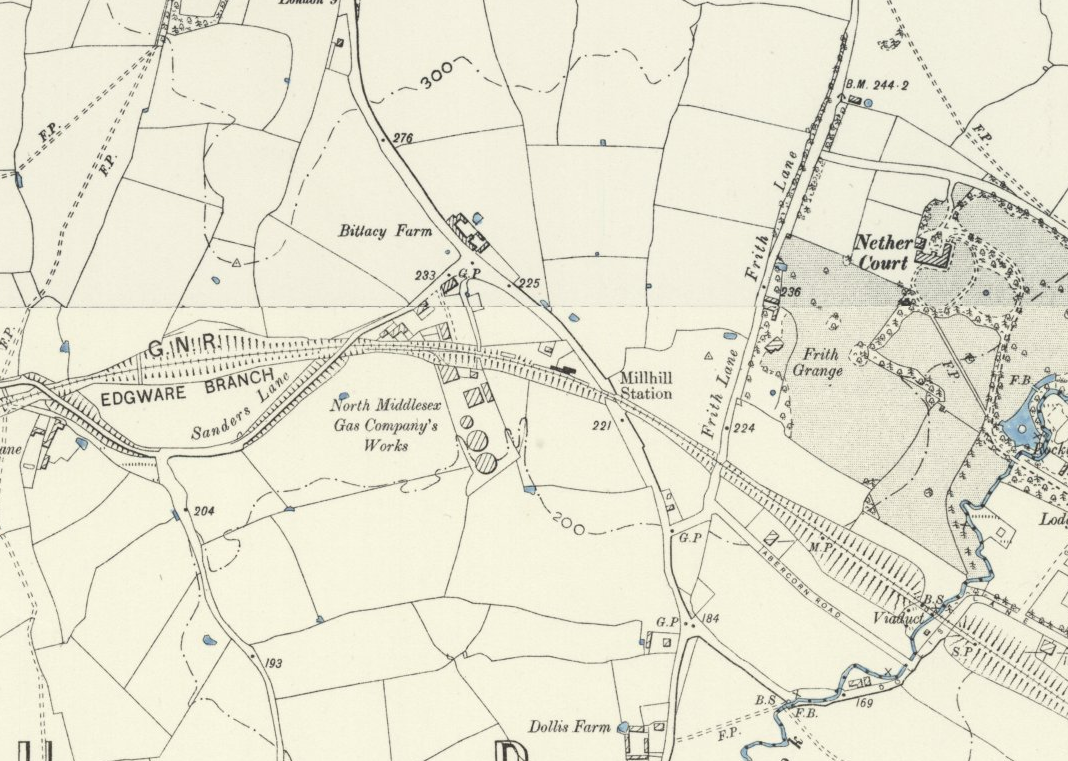
Mill Hill station on an 1890s Ordnance Survey map

Mill Hill East station was built by the Edgware, Highgate and London Railway (EH&LR) on its line from Finsbury Park station to Edgware station. Before the line was opened it was purchased in July 1867 by the larger Great Northern Railway (GNR), whose main line from King's Cross ran through Finsbury Park on its way to Potters Bar and the north. The station, originally named Mill Hill, opened along with the railway to Edgware on 22 August 1867 in what was then rural Middlesex.

The line was built as a double track formation, but only a single track was laid, with the intention of doubling the track when traffic developed. When the GNR opened a branch from Finchley Central to High Barnet in April 1872, traffic on that section was greater and the second track between Finchley Central and Edgware was never laid. For most of its history the service between those two stations was operated as a shuttle.

After the Railways Act 1921 created the Big Four railway companies, the GNR became part of the London and North Eastern Railway (LNER) in 1923. The station was given its present name on 1 March 1928.

=== Northern Heights project ===
In 1935, the London Passenger Transport Board (LPTB) announced a proposal, which became known as the Northern Heights project, to take over the LNER lines from Finsbury Park to Edgware, High Barnet and Alexandra Palace, and link them to both the Northern line at East Finchley and to the Northern City Line at Finsbury Park. (Note: At Edgware, the LNER's station was to be closed with the end of the line diverted into the Northern line's own Edgware station with an extension from there taking the line to Bushey Heath.) Reconstruction of the line from Finchley Central to Edgware with double tracks began in 1938. The line and Mill Hill East station were closed for electrification on 11 September 1939.

Following the outbreak of the Second World War on 3 September 1939, completion of the works on the line was slowed. In order to provide a service to the nearby Inglis Barracks, works continued between Finchley Central and Mill Hill East. The station re-opened with electric Northern line services on 18 May 1941. The planned second platform at Mill Hill East was not built and the service continued to operate over the single track line as before. (Note: The second track was laid as far as Mill Hill (The Hale), but was lifted when the work was halted in 1941.)

=== Post-war ===
After the war, plans to complete the Northern Heights project were reviewed but no work was carried out. Maintenance works and reconstruction of war damage on the existing network had the greatest call on London Underground funds. Funds for new works were severely limited and priority was given to the completion of the western and eastern extensions of the Central line to West Ruislip, Ongar and Hainault. Despite being shown as under construction on underground maps as late as 1950, (Note: Shown as "under construction", the Northern Heights extensions appeared for the first time on Underground poster maps in 1937 and pocket maps in 1938. After the opening of the line to Mill Hill East, the uncompleted remainder of the works were removed from the map between 1943 and 1945. The Mill Hill East to Edgware and Edgware to Bushey Heath sections appeared on the map again from 1946 to 1949 and the Finsbury Park to Alexandra Palace section appeared from 1946 to 1950.) work never restarted on the unimplemented parts of the Northern Heights project. (Note: The section of the extension between Brockley Hill and Bushey Heath was cancelled in October 1950, leaving the section between Edgware and Brockley Hill and the conversion of the line from Mill Hill East to Edgware to be decided. The announcement of its cancellation was finally made in February 1954.)

British Railways (the successor to the LNER) freight trains continued to serve the station's goods yard until 1 October 1962, when it was closed. (Note: Freight services continued to Edgware until 1 June 1964.) The site of the yard is now a business park. As one of two EH&LR stations retaining their original buildings (with Finchley Central), it is one of the oldest parts of the Underground system, pre-dating the first tunnelled section of the Northern line (the City and South London Railway) by more than twenty years. (Note: The City & South London Railway opened in 1890 between King William Street in the City of London and Stockwell in Lambeth.)

== Today ==
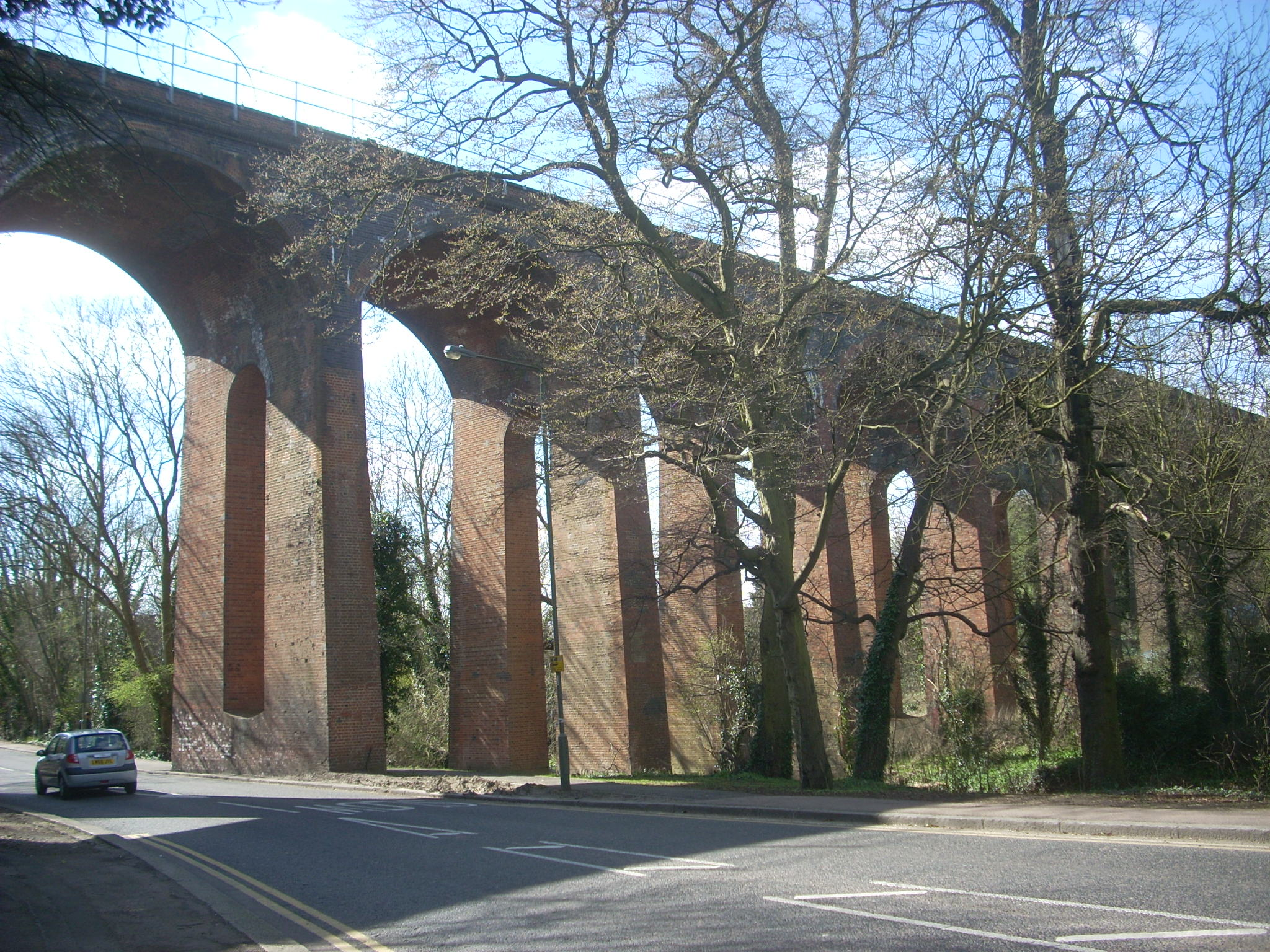
The Dollis Brook Viaduct between Mill Hill East and Finchley Central

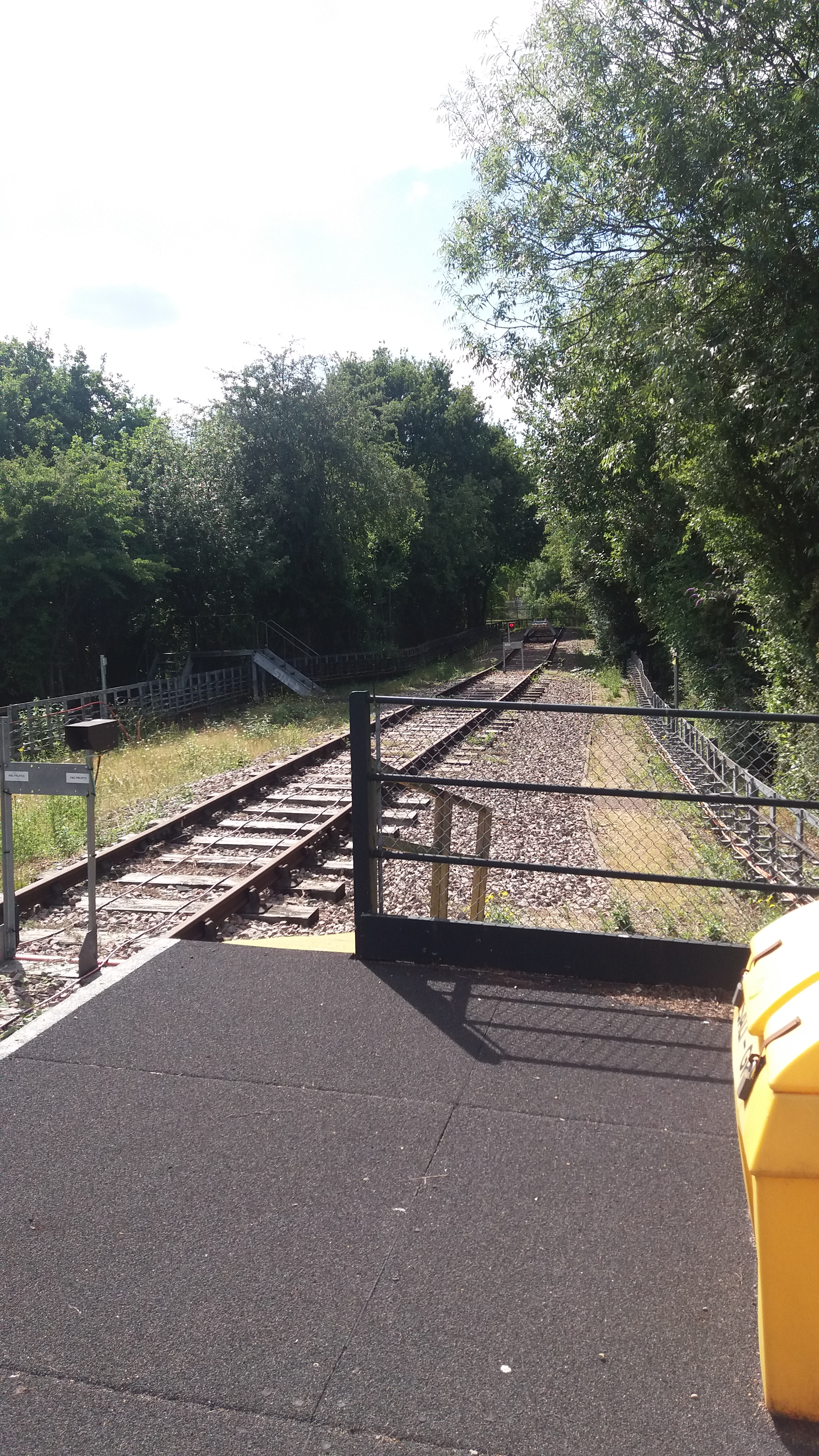
The end of the Northern Heights plan at Mill Hill East

Refurbishment of the station was carried out and completed in 2007. The works included structural repairs to the station and platforms, the re-decoration and re-tiling of walls and floors, a new public address system, as well as CCTV cameras and Help Points.

The station was made accessible in 2020 by means of a new lift and link bridge, which was prefabricated off site, and craned into position in August 2019. The lift finally opened in February 2020, becoming the Underground's 79th step-free station. It is one of the three tube stations not to have ticket barriers.

== Services ==
Mill Hill East station is the terminus of a single-track branch of the Northern line in London fare zone 4. The next station is Finchley Central in the High Barnet branch. With 1.62 million passengers in 2024, it is the 238th busiest station on the network.

As of October 2006 the Northern line service was a shuttle on the single track between Finchley Central and Mill Hill East, with the exception of peak-hour services. Direct weekend trains were discontinued on 20 May 2007. As of 2014 direct peak time trains operate to either Kennington (via Charing Cross) or Morden (via Bank).

However, in 2021, direct trains were reintroduced, with trains now running either to Battersea Power Station via Charing Cross, or to Morden via Bank, each approximately every 30 minutes, giving a train around every 15 minutes on the branch line to Finchley Central.

== Connections ==
London Bus routes 221, 240 and 382 serve the station.

Mill Hill East also serves Saracens F.C. on match-days when shuttle buses run from the station to a short walking distance from their stadium, Barnet Copthall.

== Notes and references ==
=== Bibliography ===
- Beard, Tony (2002). By Tube Beyond Edgware. Capital Transport. ISBN 978-1-85414-246-7.
- Bownes, David; Green, Oliver; Mullins, Sam (2012). Underground: How the Tube Shaped London. Allen Lane. ISBN 978-1-84614-462-2.
- Brown, Joe (2015) [2006]. London Railway Atlas (4th ed.). Ian Allan. ISBN 978-0-7110-3819-6.
- Butt, R.V.J. (1995). The Directory of Railway Stations. Yeovil: Patrick Stephens Ltd. ISBN 1-85260-508-1.
- Day, John R; Reed, John (2010) [1963]. The Story of London's Underground (11th ed.). Capital Transport. ISBN 978-1-85414-341-9.
- Harris, Cyril M. (2001) [1977]. What's in a name? (4th ed.). Capital Transport. ISBN 978-1-85414-241-2.
- Rose, Douglas (1999) [1980]. The London Underground, A Diagrammatic History (7th ed.). Douglas Rose/Capital Transport. ISBN 978-1-85414-219-1.
- Wolmar, Christian (2005) [2004]. The Subterranean Railway: How the London Underground Was Built and How It Changed the City Forever. Atlantic Books. ISBN 978-1-84354-023-6.

Preceding station	London Underground	Following station
Terminus	Northern line	Finchley Central towards Battersea Power Station, Morden or Kennington
Abandoned Northern Heights extension
Mill Hill (The Hale) towards Bushey Heath	Northern line	Finchley Central towards Morden or Kennington
Disused railways
Mill Hill; Line and station closed	British Railways (Eastern Region); Edgware, Highgate and London Railway	Finchley Central; Line and station open
