= List of people from Hampstead =

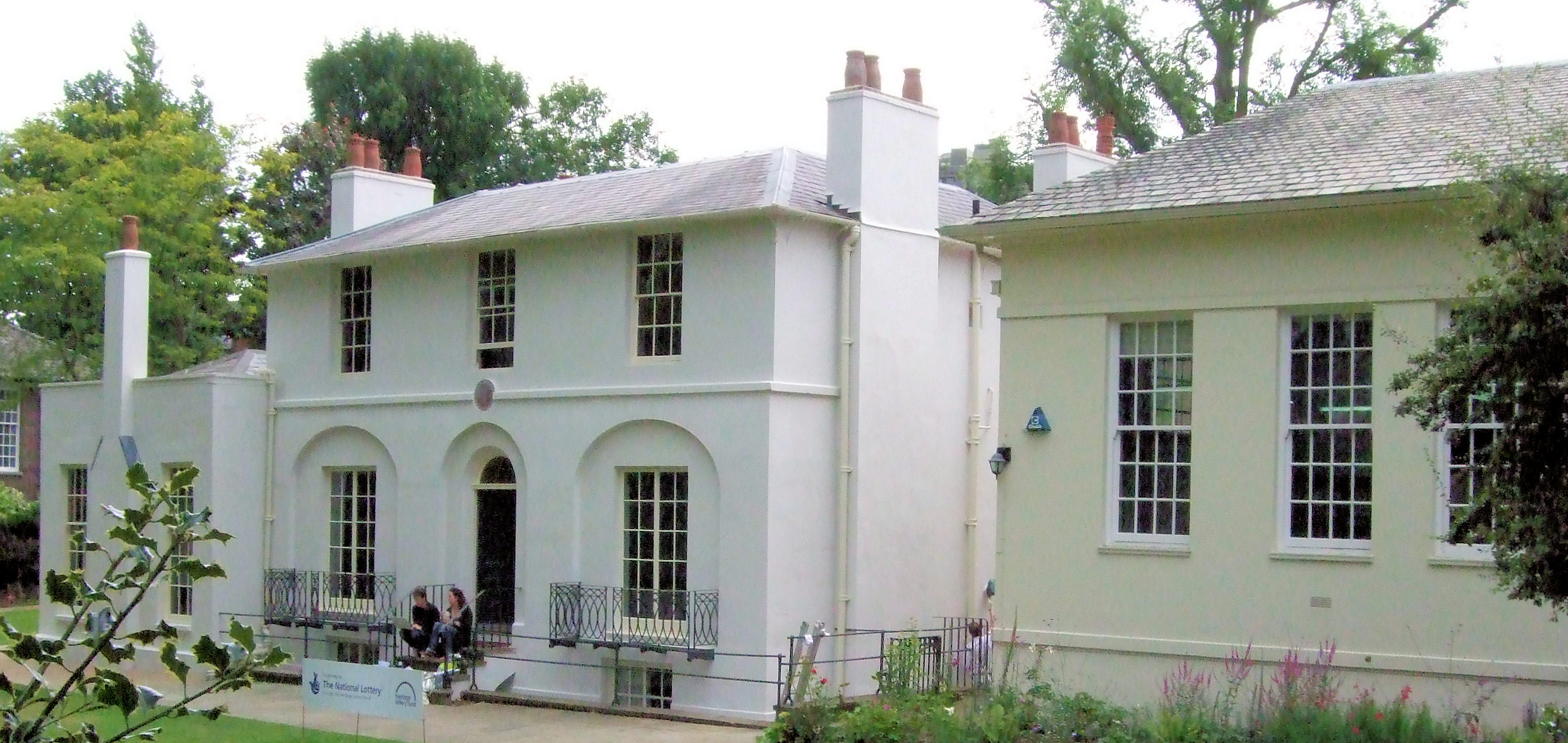
Keats House, Hampstead, where John Keats wrote "Ode to a Nightingale"

This is a list of notable people who have lived in Hampstead, an area of northwest London known for its intellectual, liberal, artistic, musical, and literary associations. After 1917, and again in the 1930s, it became base to a community of avant garde artists and writers and was host to a number of émigrés and exiles from the Russian Revolution and Nazi Europe.

Amongst the people on this list who were born in Hampstead are politician Nigel Lawson, racing driver Damon Hill, actors Stephen Fry and Dirk Bogarde, singer Jon English, novelist Evelyn Waugh, and the English educator and administrator Robert Laurie Morant. Several of the people on this list, including John Constable, Eleanor Farjeon, and Hugh Gaitskell are buried in the churchyard of St John-at-Hampstead. The Hampstead post code district (NW3) includes the neighbourhoods of Frognal, Chalk Farm, Swiss Cottage, Belsize Park and parts of Primrose Hill.

Note: * indicates people born in Hampstead.

== Music and dance ==
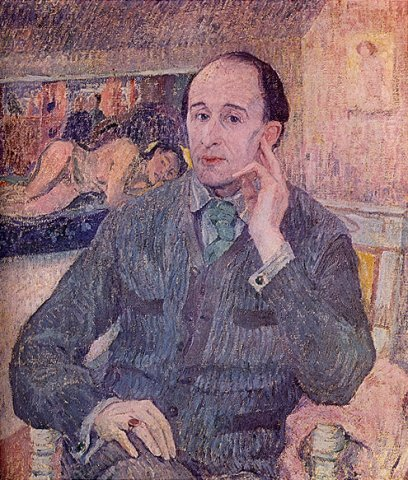
Composer Frederick Delius who lived at 44 Belsize Park Gardens from 1918 to 1919

- Larry Adler (American harmonica player)
- Thomas Augustine Barrett aka Leslie Stuart (English composer)
- Sir Arnold Bax (English classical composer and poet)
- Arthur Bliss (English classical composer)
- Dennis Brain (English classical horn player)
- Alfred Brendel (Austrian classical pianist)
- Jonny Buckland (British guitarist and songwriter, member of Coldplay)
- Clara Butt (English contralto opera singer)
- Will Champion (English drummer and songwriter, member of Coldplay)
- Sir Edward Elgar (English classical composer)
- Frederick Delius (English classical composer)
- Jacqueline du Pré (British cellist)
- Jon English Australian singer, songwriter, musician and actor
- Marianne Faithfull (English singer-songwriter)
- Howie Payne (English singer, songwriter, music producer)
- Kathleen Ferrier (English contralto opera singer)
- Liam Gallagher (English singer and songwriter, member of Oasis)
- Tamara Karsavina (Russian ballerina)
- Hans Keller (Austrian-born violinist and musicologist)
- Frederic King (Victorian era baritone and teacher of singing)
- Stephen Kovacevich (American classical pianist and conductor)
- Nick Mason (English drummer, member of Pink Floyd)
- Tobias Matthay (English classical pianist and composer)
- John McCormack (Irish tenor opera and concert singer)
- Yehudi Menuhin (American-born classical violinist of Lithuanian Jewish origin)
- Orlando Morgan, English music teacher, composer and musicologist, at Harvard Court, Honeybourne Road.
- Jon Moss (English drummer, best known as member of Culture Club)
- Anna Pavlova (Russian ballerina)
- Paul Robeson (American classical singer and actor)
- Cecil Sharp (English composer, principal of the Hampstead Conservatoire)
- Slash * (British-American musician, guitarist for Guns N' Roses and Velvet Revolver)
- Sting (English rock musician, singer-songwriter)
- Harry Styles (English singer and member of One Direction)
- Jess Glynne * (English singer and songwriter)
- Sam Smith * (English pop singer and songwriter)
- Jennifer Vyvyan(English operatic soprano)

== Literature ==
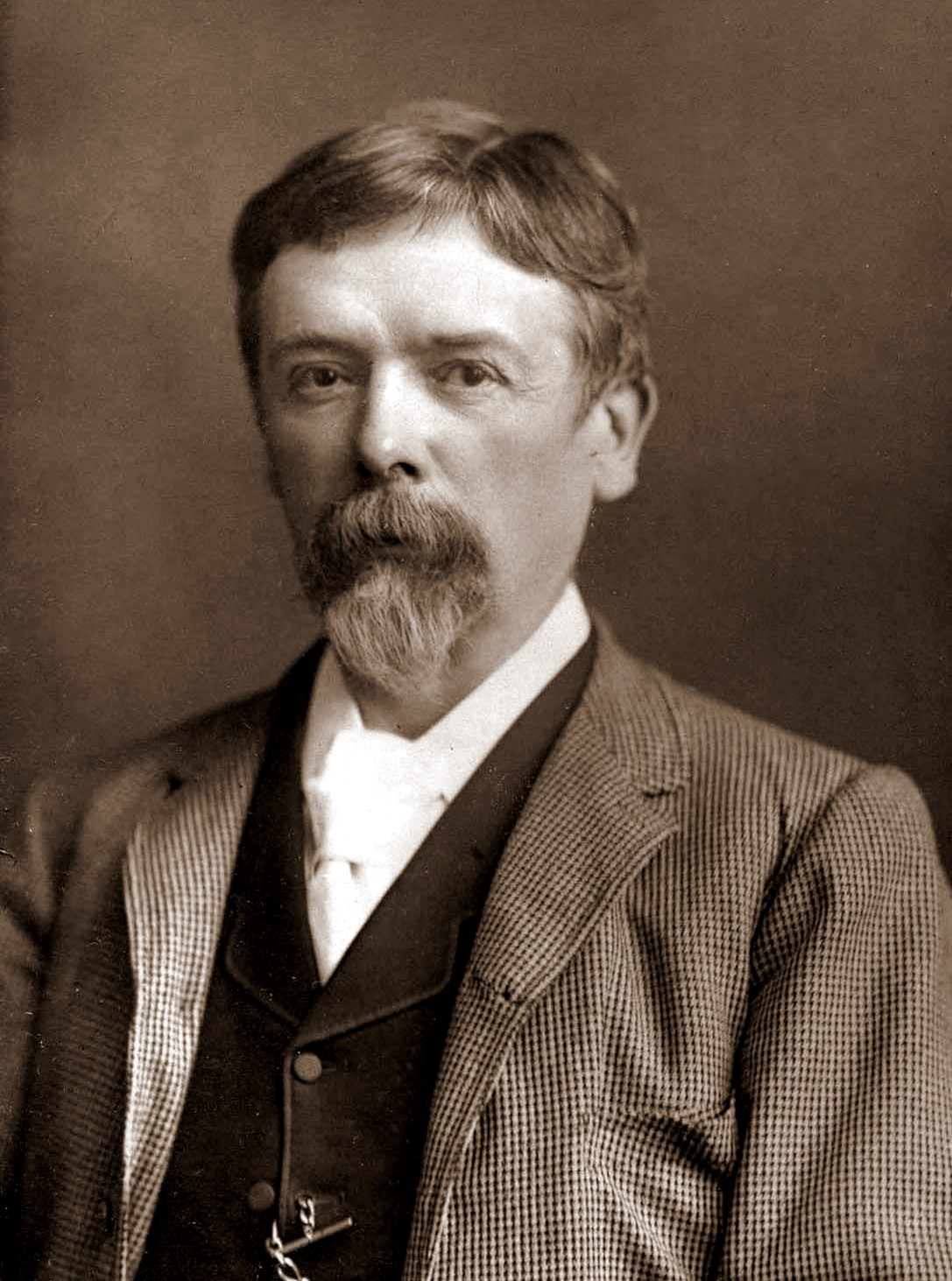
Novelist and cartoonist George du Maurier who lived at 28 Hampstead Grove from 1874 to 1895

- Edwin Abbott Abbott (headmaster and theological writer)
- Eliza Acton (English poet and cook)
- Robert Aickman (English fiction writer)
- Lucy Aikin (English author and historian)
- Alfred Ainger (English biographer and critic)
- Martin Amis (British novelist)
- William Allingham (Irish poet)
- Christopher Andrewes (British academic and editor)
- John Armstrong (Scottish poet)
- Alan Ayckbourn * (British playwright)
- Joanna Baillie (Scottish poet and dramatist)
- Robert Bakewell (English geologist)
- William Bayliss (English physiologist)
- Enid Blyton (British author)
- Robert Dudley Baxter (English economist and statistician)
- Sybille Bedford (German-born English novelist, biographer, and travel writer)
- Walter Besant (English novelist and historian)
- John Betjeman (English poet)
- Basil Bunting (English poet)
- Lord Byron (English poet)
- Gilbert Cannan (British novelist and dramatist)
- Elias Canetti (Bulgarian-born modernist novelist and playwright)
- Allan Chappelow (English photographer and writer of books on George Bernard Shaw)
- Agatha Christie (British crime writer of novels, short stories and plays)
- Samuel Taylor Coleridge (English poet)
- Hunter Davies (British writer and journalist)
- Jean de Bosschère (after 1944: Jean de Boschère) (Belgian (French) poet, author, essayist, painter, illustrator, sculptor)
- Daphne du Maurier (English novelist and playwright; granddaughter of George du Maurier)
- George du Maurier (British novelist and cartoonist)
- Halide Edip (Turkish novelist)
- T. S. Eliot (American-born British poet, playwright, and literary critic)
- Sir William Empson (English literary critic and poet)
- Eleanor Farjeon (English writer, particularly of children's literature)
- Ian Fleming (British journalist and novelist, creator of the James Bond novels)
- Margaret Forster (English novelist)
- John Fowles (English novelist and essayist)
- Antonia Fraser (British biographer)
- Carlos Fuentes (Mexican novelist)
- John Galsworthy (English novelist and playwright; recipient of the 1932 Nobel Prize in Literature)
- Wilfrid Wilson Gibson (English Georgian poet)
- Jane Green (English novelist and screenwriter)
- Geoffrey Grigson (English poet)
- Thom Gunn (Anglo-American poet)
- Leigh Hunt (English critic, essayist, poet)
- Aldous Huxley (English novelist and essayist)
- John Keats (English poet)
- Marghanita Laski (English novelist, playwright and critic)
- Margaret Laurence (Canadian novelist)
- D H Lawrence (English novelist, poet, and literary critic)
- John Le Carré (English novelist)
- Eddie Linden (Scottish poet and editor)
- Katherine Mansfield (New Zealand-born short story writer)
- John Mortimer * (English barrister and dramatist)
- John Middleton Murry (English essayist, novelist, and critic)
- George Orwell (British novelist and journalist)
- J. B. Priestley (English novelist, playwright, and broadcaster)
- Percy Bysshe Shelley (English poet)
- Edith Sitwell (English poet and critic)
- Stephen Spender (English poet, novelist, and essayist)
- Robert Louis Stevenson (Scottish novelist, poet, and essayist)
- Kate Summerscale (English non-fiction writer)
- Rabindranath Tagore (Bengali poet, novelist, musician, painter and playwright)
- Alec Waugh (British novelist)
- Evelyn Waugh * (English novelist, travel writer, and biographer)
- Anna Wickham (British poet)

== Theatre and film ==
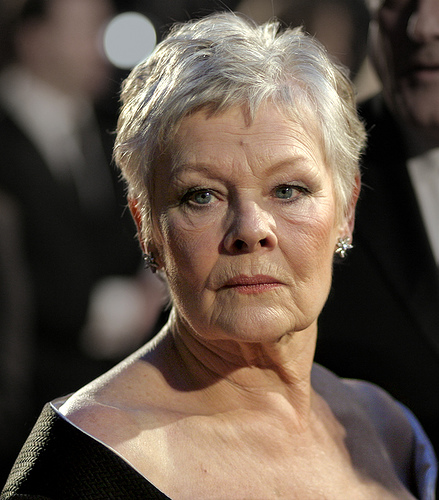
Actress Judi Dench, whose cottage in Hampstead was destroyed by fire in 1993

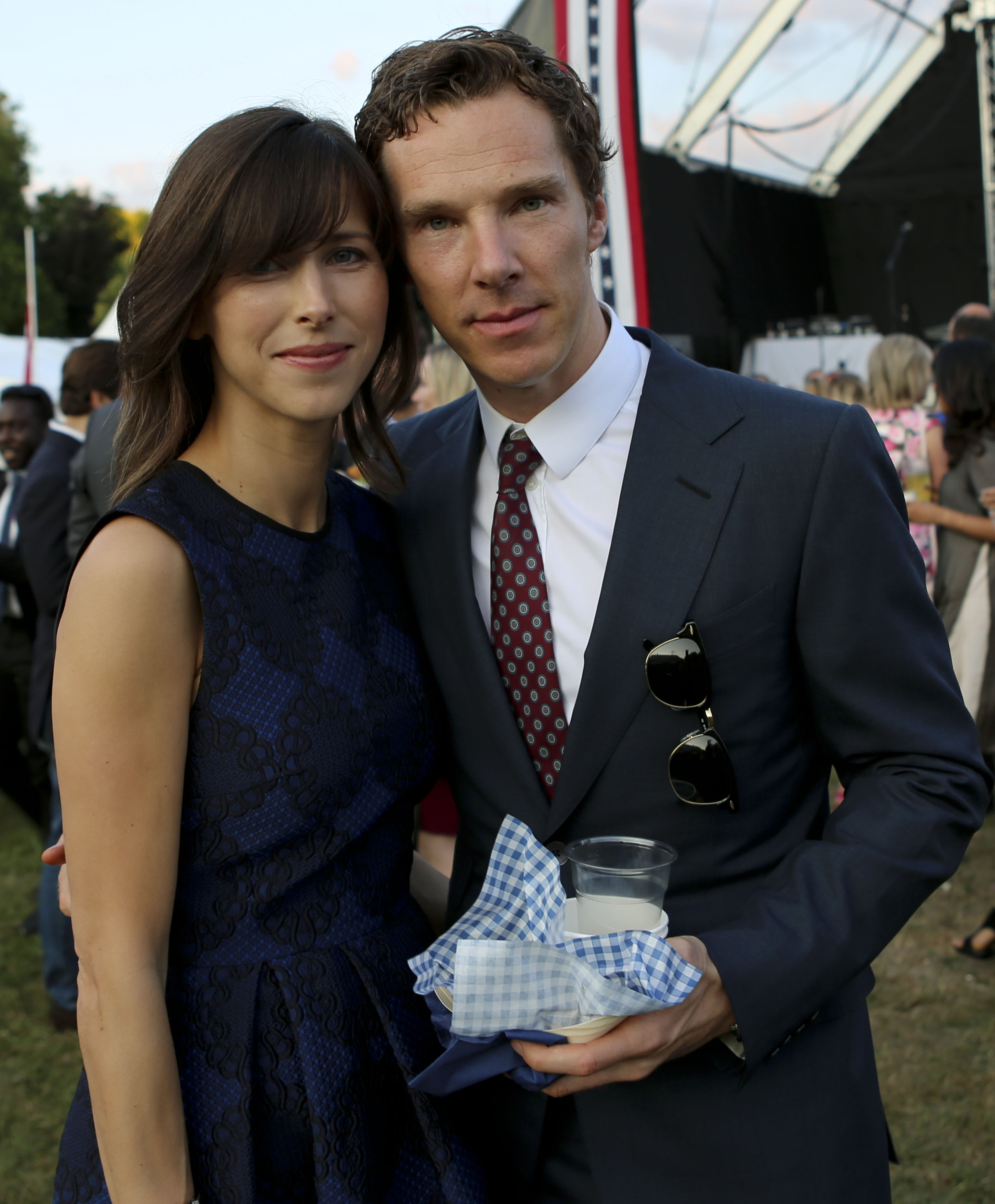
Sophie Hunter and Benedict Cumberbatch were residents of Hampstead until 2015 where they moved to neighbouring Dartmouth Park

- Simon Amstell (English comedian, television presenter, screenwriter and actor)
- Dame Peggy Ashcroft (English actress)
- Peter Barkworth (English actor)
- Dirk Bogarde * (English actor and novelist)
- Michael Byrne [English actor] Born, schooled and resided in Hampstead
- Richard Burton (Welsh actor)
- Rhys Matthew Bond (British-born actor whose family moved to Canada when he was 10 years old)
- Emilia Clarke (English actress)
- Tom Conti (Scottish actor)
- Peter Cook (English satirist, writer and comedian)
- Dame Judi Dench (English actress, widow of Michael Williams)
- Gerald du Maurier * (English actor and theatre manager)
- Stephen Fry * (English actor, screenwriter, playwright, comedian)
- Ricky Gervais (British comedian, actor, director, and writer)
- Michael Gothard (British actor)
- Laurence Harvey (British actor)
- Mamoun Hassan (Saudi-born British Film Maker)
- Jim Henson (American puppeteer and filmmaker)
- Sophie Hunter (English theatre and opera director, wife of actor Benedict Cumberbatch)
- Jeremy Irons (English actor) and Sinéad Cusack (Irish actress)
- Wolf Kahler (German actor)
- Valerie Leon (British actress and model)
- Hugh Manning (English actor)
- Helena Michell (British actress, born and raised in Hampstead)
- Margaret Nolan * (actress, artist, model)
- Peter O'Toole (Irish actor)
- Harold Pinter (British playwright, screenwriter, director, and actor)
- Karel Reisz (Czech-born British filmmaker)
- Ralph Richardson (English actor)
- Ridley Scott (British film director and producer)
- Alastair Sim (Scottish actor)
- Marie Studholme (English musical comedy actress and picture postcard beauty)
- Dame Elizabeth Taylor * (London-born British-American actress)
- Marti Webb (British actress and singer)
- Anton Walbrook (Austrian actor, also known as Adolf Wohlbrueck)
- Tom Wilkinson (British actor)
- Finty Williams (English actress, daughter of Judi Dench and Michael Williams)
- Michael Williams (English actor, late husband of Judi Dench)

== Visual arts and architecture ==
- Mary Adshead (English painter, illustrator and designer)
- Helen Allingham (English watercolour painter and illustrator)
- Charles Baxter (English portrait painter)
- Cecil Beaton * (English photographer, interior and stage designer)
- Reginald Blomfield (British architect)
- Robert Polhill Bevan (English painter and lithographer)
- Dorothy Bohm (Königsberg-born photographer)
- Jean de Bosschère (after 1944: Jean de Boschère) (Belgian (French) poet, author, essayist, painter, illustrator, sculptor)
- Arthur Boyd (Australian painter)
- Frank Brangwyn (Anglo-Welsh water colourist, engraver and illustrator)
- Patrick Caulfield (British photorealist artist)
- Jessie Case Vesel (English painter)
- Basil Champneys (British architect)
- Ewan Christian (British architect)
- John Constable (English landscape painter)
- Luis Ricardo Falero (Spanish painter)
- Horace Field (British architect)
- Walter Field (English painter)
- Lucian Freud (Berlin-born British painter)
- Naum Gabo (Russian sculptor)
- Nick Gentry (English portrait artist)
- Mark Gertler (British painter)
- Kate Greenaway (British illustrator)
- Ernő Goldfinger (Hungarian-born architect and furniture designer)
- Walter Gropius (German architect and founder of the Bauhaus School)
- John Heartfield (German photomontage artist)
- Barbara Hepworth (English sculptor)
- Frank Holl (English painter and royal portraitist)
- John Linnell (English painter)

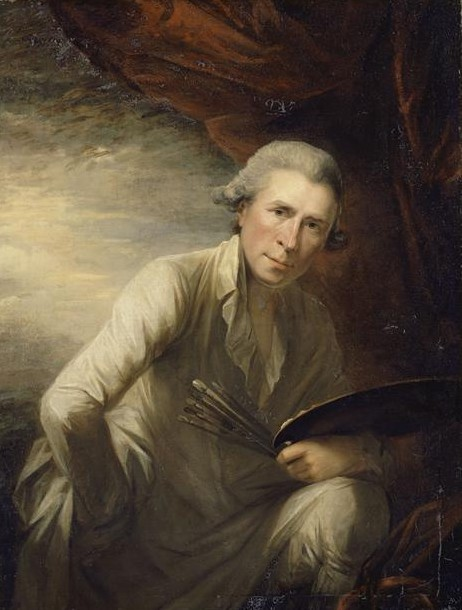
Self-portrait of George Romney who lived at 5 Holly Bush Hill

- Berthold Lubetkin (Russian émigré architect)
- Bernard Meadows (English Sculptor)
- Lee Miller (American photographer)
- Marie-Louise von Motesiczky (Austrian painter)
- Henry Moore (English sculptor)
- Piet Mondrian (Dutch painter)
- Ben Nicholson (English abstract painter)
- Roland Penrose (English surrealist artist, poet, and art collector)
- Arthur Rackham (English book illustrator)
- Brian Robb (English artist, illustrator and cartoonist)
- George Romney (English portrait painter)
- William Rothenstein (painter, writer, lecturer)
- Frank O. Salisbury (English artist; built his house, Sarum Chase, at Hampstead)
- George Gilbert Scott (English architect)
- George Gilbert Scott Jr. (English architect)
- Henry Courtney Selous (English painter)
- Richard Norman Shaw (British architect)
- Eric Slater (English woodcut artist)
- Alfred Stevens (British sculptor)
- Vernon Ward (British painter)

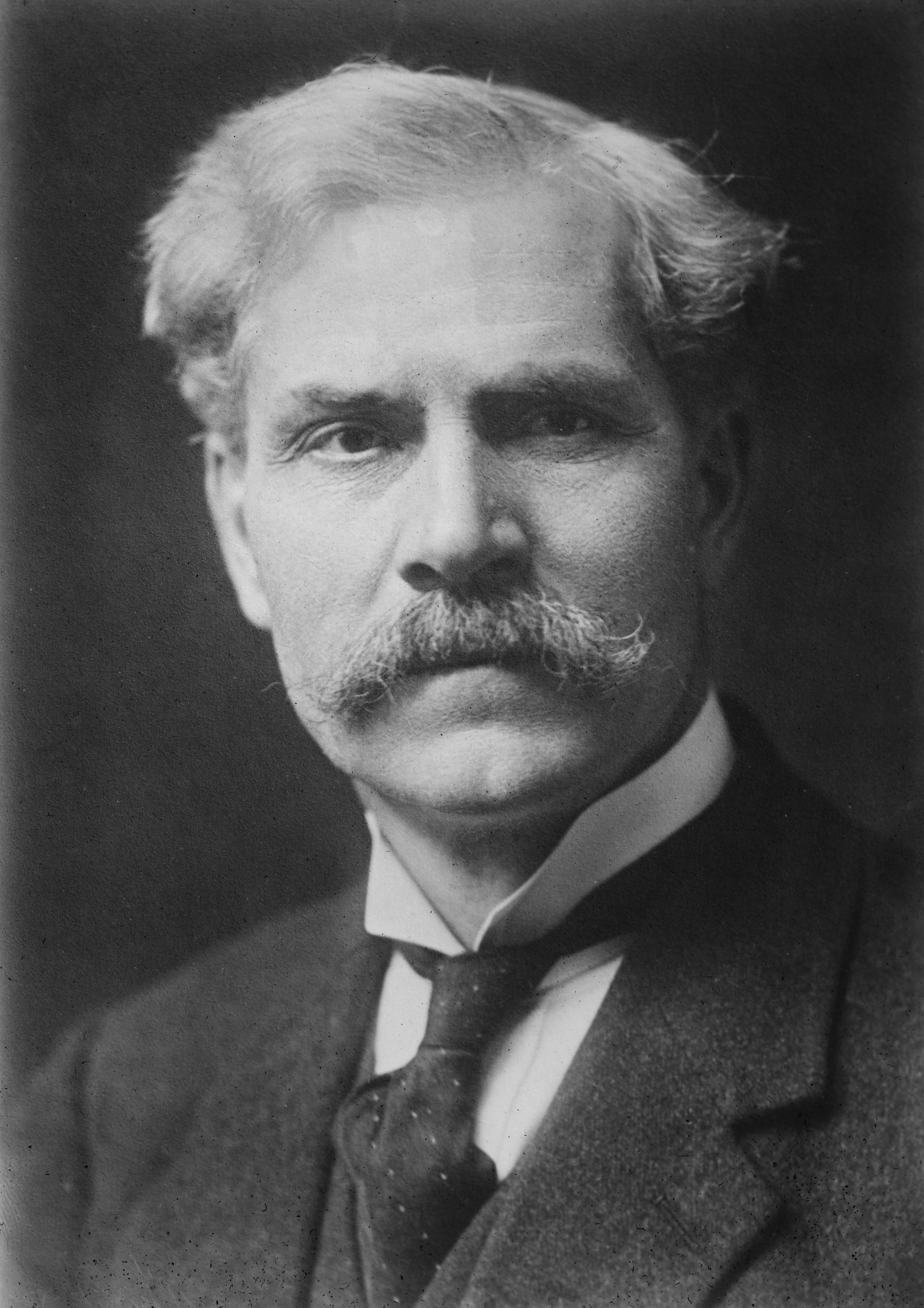
Former Prime Minister Ramsay MacDonald, who lived at 103 Frognal Lodge

== Politics and social activism ==
- H.H. Asquith (British Liberal Prime Minister 1908–1916)
- Henrietta Barnett (English social reformer and author, married to Samuel Augustus Barnett)
- Samuel Augustus Barnett (Anglican clergyman and social reformer)
- Aneurin Bevan (Welsh Labour Party politician)
- Henry Brooke (British Conservative Party politician)
- Anthony Crosland (British Labour Party politician)
- Andrew Fisher (Australian Prime Minister 1908–1909, 1910–1913)
- Michael Foot (British Labour Party politician and journalist)
- Charles de Gaulle (French general and statesman, President of France 1959–1969), whose family lived at 99 Frognal for the last ten months of their English exile in the Second World War
- Hugh Gaitskell (British Labour Party politician)
- Denis Healey (British Labour Party politician)
- Louisa Gurney Hoare (writer on education)
- Leonard Trelawny Hobhouse (British liberal politician and sociologist)
- Henry Hyndman (English writer and socialist politician)
- Douglas Jay (British Labour Party politician)
- Roy Jenkins (British Labour Party politician)
- Muhammad Ali Jinnah (lawyer, statesman and the founder of Pakistan)
- Lord Leverhulme (English industrialist, philanthropist, and Liberal Party politician)
- Gertrude Golda Lowy (suffragette, member of Women's Social and Political Union and Jewish League for Woman Suffrage)
- Ramsay MacDonald (British Labour politician and twice Prime Minister)
- Tomáš Garrigue Masaryk (Czech philosopher and politician living in exile in Platts Lane during the First World War; in 1918 became first President of the Czechoslovakia)
- Temple Moore (British architect)
- Onora O'Neill (British philosopher, cross bench member of the House of Lords)
- Frank Pakenham later Lord Longford (British Labour Party politician)
- William Pitt the Elder (British Prime Minister)
- Barbara Robb (British campaigner for the elderly)
- Adrian Gilbert Scott (British architect)
- Sir Neil Shields (British Conservative Party politician and businessman)
- Harry Vane (English statesman and Member of Parliament, Governor of Massachusetts Bay Colony 1636–1637)
- Beatrice Webb (British sociologist, economist, and socialist reformer; married to Sidney Webb)
- Sidney Webb (British economist, socialist reformer and co-founder of the London School of Economics)

== Science and medicine ==
- Lord Edgar Adrian (British electrophysiologist, recipient of the 1932 Nobel Prize in Medicine)
- Mark Akenside (English physician)
- W. W. Rouse Ball (English mathematician)
- Hugh Kerr Anderson (British physiologist and educator)
- Edward Victor Appleton (English physicist)
- George Armstrong (Scottish pharmacist and physician)
- Ronald Aylmer Fisher (English statistician and evolutionary biologist)
- Thomas Balogh (Hungarian economist)
- Henry Dale (English pharmacologist, recipient of the 1936 Nobel Prize in Medicine)
- Anna Freud (Austrian child psychologist, daughter of Sigmund Freud)
- Sigmund Freud (Austrian neurologist and psychiatrist)
- Harold Gillies (New Zealand-born, otolaryngologist and plastic surgeon)
- Sir Alexander Houston
- Andrew Huxley (English physiologist and biophysicist, recipient of the 1963 Nobel Prize in Medicine)
- Julian Huxley (English evolutionary biologist, half brother of Andrew Huxley)
- Florence Nightingale (English nursing pioneer and statistician)
- Karl Pearson (British statistician)
- Selwyn Selwyn-Clarke (British physician and barrister)
- William Sharpey (Scottish physiologist and anatomist)
- Rupert Sheldrake (English scientist and author)
- Marie Stopes (British palaeobotanist and birth control pioneer)
- Joseph Warren Zambra (Pioneering photographer, optician and co-founter of the scientific instrument makers Negretti and Zambra)

== Media, journalism, and broadcasting ==
- Ernest Belfort Bax (British Marxist journalist and philosopher)
- Henry Brailsford (journalist)
- John Passmore Edwards (journalist, newspaper owner and philanthropist)
- Judy Finnigan (broadcaster, married to Richard Madeley)
- Clement Freud (broadcaster, writer, politician)
- John Lawrence Hammond (British journalist and writer on social history)
- Richard Madeley (broadcaster, married to Judy Finnigan)
- Jonathan Romain (rabbi, Doctor of Philosophy, MBE, religious and social leader, writer and broadcaster)
- Charles Saatchi (advertising executive and art collector)

== Sport ==
- Heung-min Son (South Korean footballer)
- Andrey Arshavin (Russian footballer)
- Chris Bonington * (British mountaineer)
- Harriet Dart (British tennis player)
- Harold Evans (Cricketer)
- Cesc Fàbregas (Spanish footballer)
- Thierry Henry (French footballer)
- Damon Hill * (British racing driver)
- Alexander Hleb (Belarusian footballer)
- Tiago Ilori * (Portuguese footballer)
- Reginald Macaulay (Old Etonian amateur footballer, veteran FA Cup Finals 1881 to 1883, lived in later life at Eton Avenue and was buried at the Parish Church)
- Gillian McKeith (television personality and author)
- Samir Nasri (French footballer)
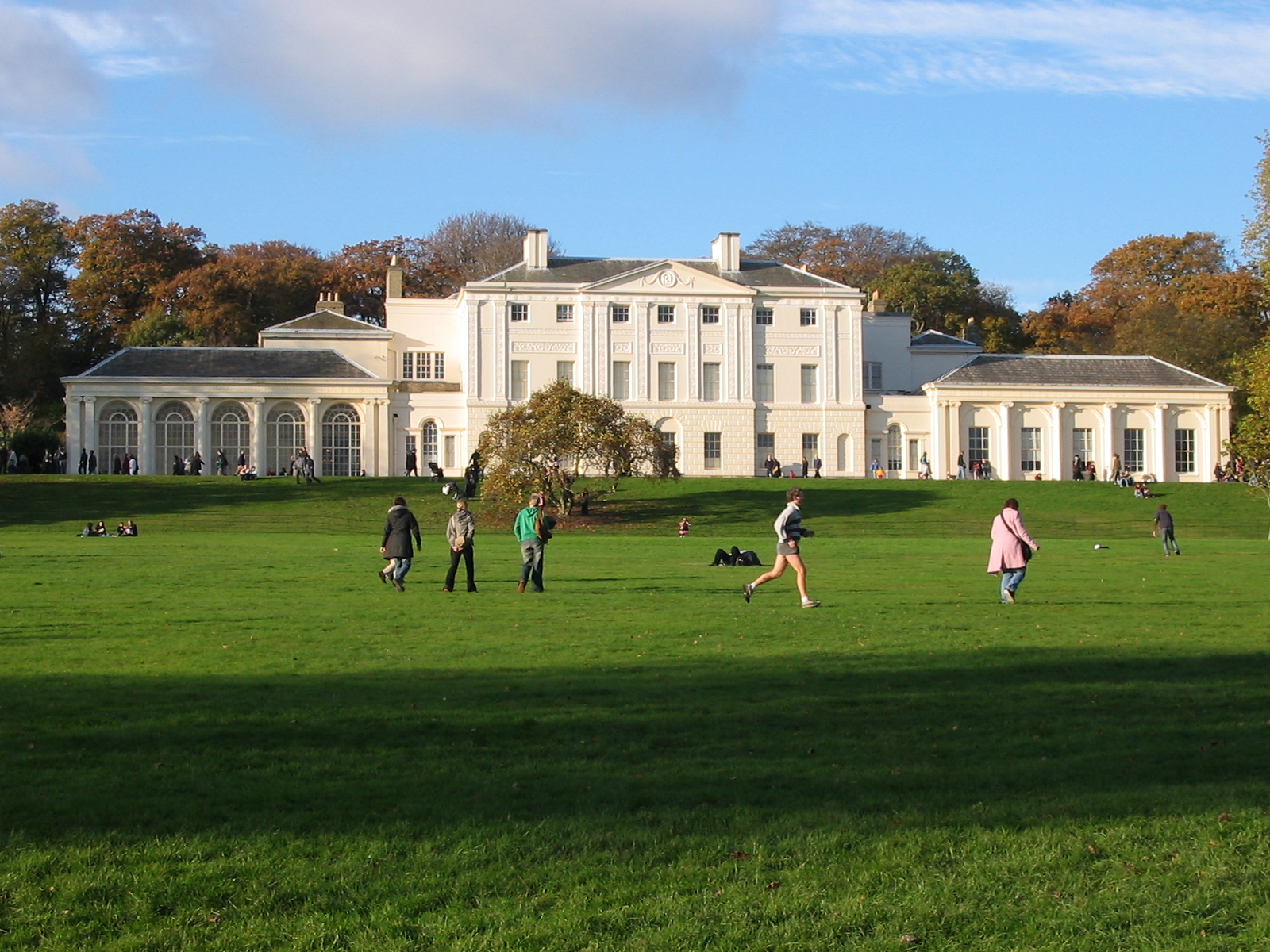
  Kenwood House, home of William Murray in the 18th century and Edward Guinness in the 20th century
- Robin van Persie (Dutch footballer)
- Patrick Vieira (French footballer)
- Christian Eriksen (Danish footballer)
- Geoffrey Wood (Cricketer)

== Other ==
- Gilbert Abbott à Beckett (English humourist)
- Lord Edgar Adrian (philosopher)
- Richard Amner (English Presbyterian minister)
- Major John Thompson McKellar Anderson (recipient of the Victoria Cross)
- Richard Arde (barrister and politician)
- Cyril Asquith (barrister, judge and Law Lord)
- Raymond Asquith (barrister and army officer)
- Sir A. J. Ayer (philosopher)
- Sir Richard Burton (explorer and diplomat)
- Lord Clark (art historian)
- King Constantine and Queen Anne-Marie of Greece (exiled monarchs of Greece)
- Fritz Dupre, iron and manganese ore merchant, known as the "Manganese Ore King"
- Maxime de la Falaise (English model, designer and food writer; daughter of Oswald Birley)
- David Devant (magician)
- Margaret Gardiner (British art collector and peace campaigner)
- Thomas Field Gibson (manufacturer and benefactor)
- Sir Ernst Gombrich (art historian)
- Jane Goodall * (English explorer)
- Edward Guinness, 1st Earl of Iveagh (brewing magnate and philanthropist)
- Rowland Hill (postal reformer)
- Friedrich von Hügel (theologian)
- Leonard Huxley (schoolteacher and biographer)
- Robert Laurie Morant * (English educator and administrator)
- William Murray, 1st Earl of Mansfield (barrister and judge)
- Flinders Petrie (Egyptologist)
- Caroline Anne James Skeel (educator)
- Michael Ventris (classical scholar and paleographer)
- Sir Nicholas George Winton (British humanitarian)
- Thomas Wise (book collector and suspected forger)
