= New End Square =

Square in Hampstead, London

Coordinates: 51.55848°N 0.17586°W

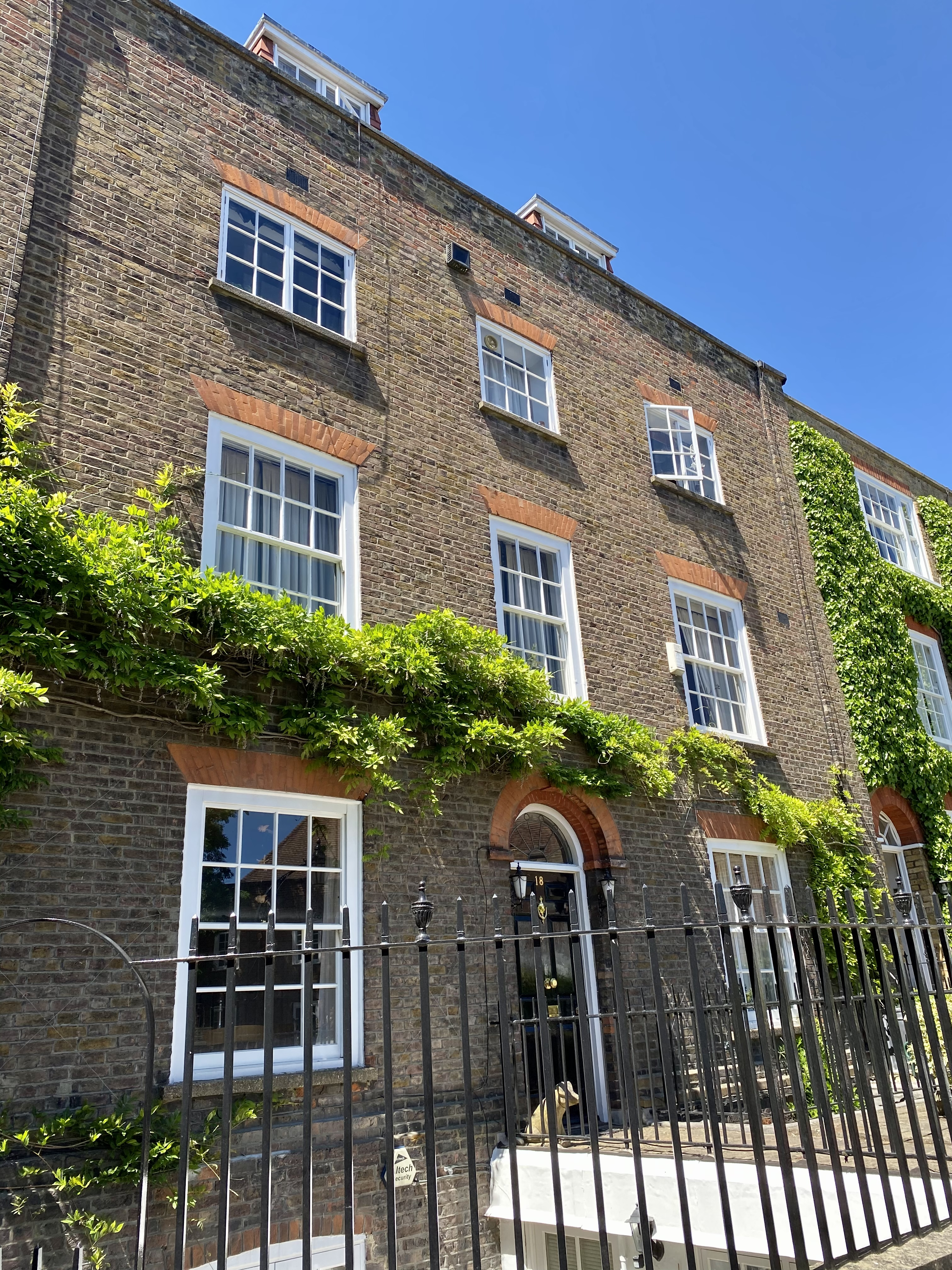
A house in the square.

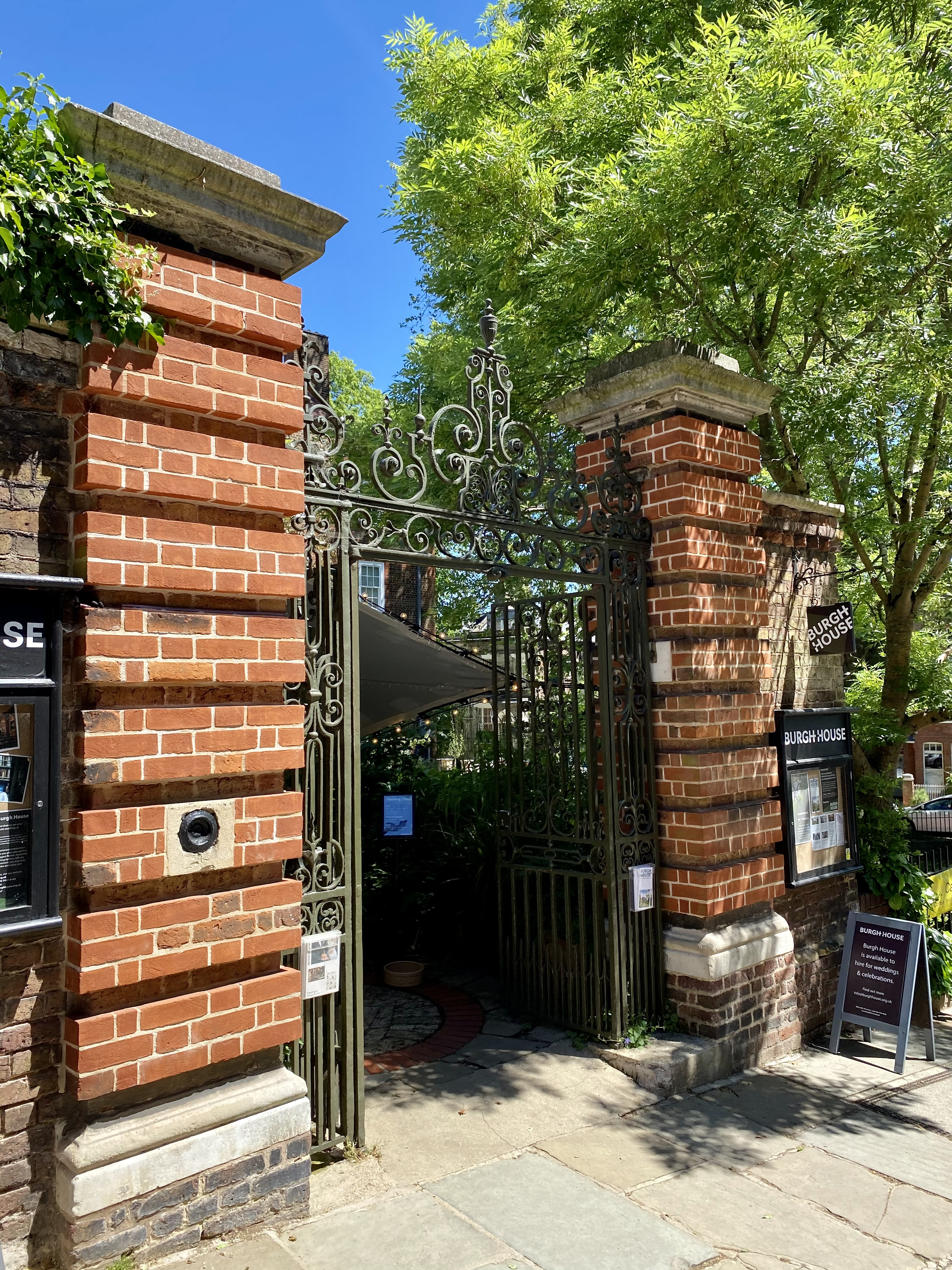
Entrance to Burgh House on New End Square.

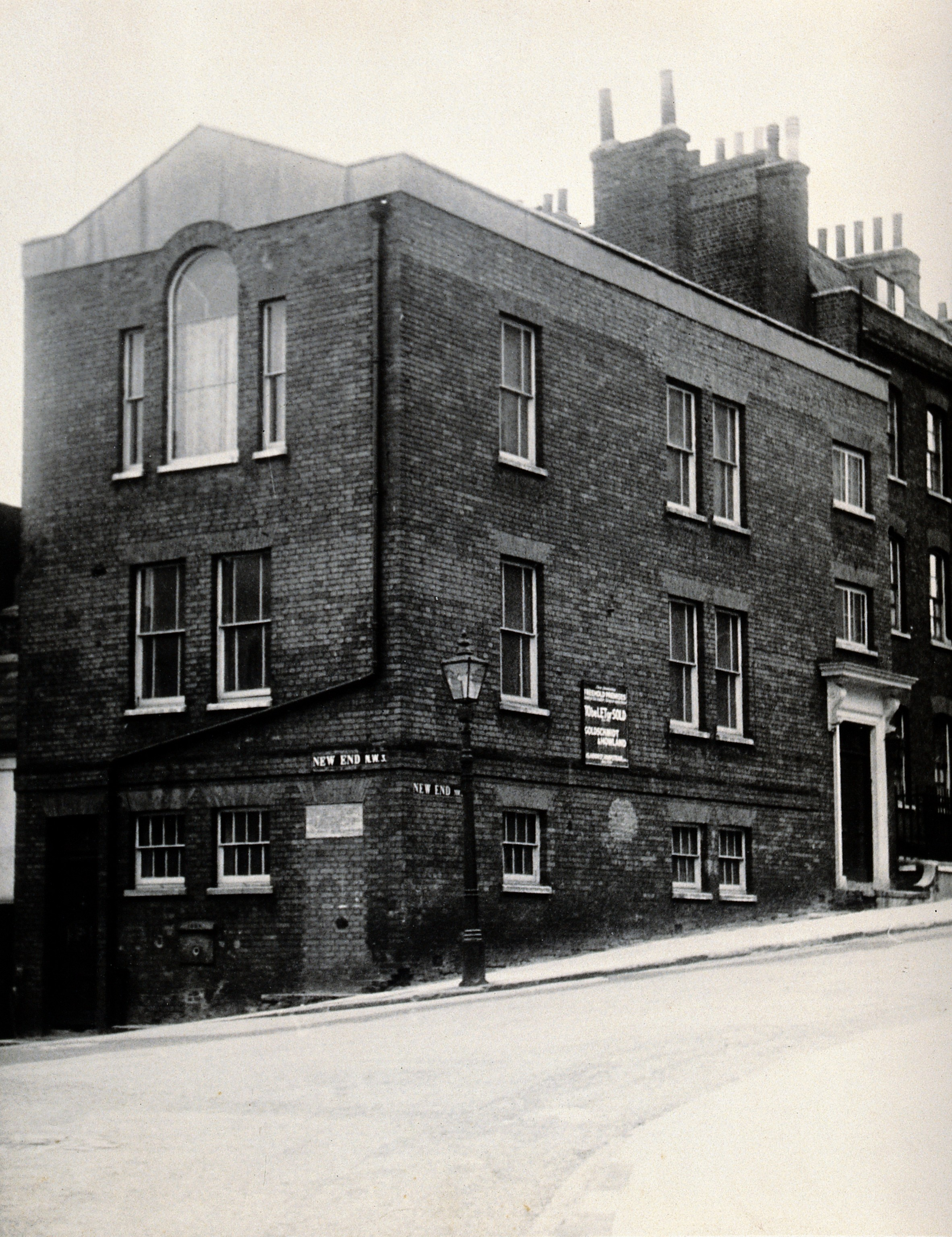
The New End Hospital.

New End Square is a square in Hampstead, in the London Borough of Camden. It dates back to the early eighteenth century when it was located close to the Hampstead Wells spa on the adjacent Well Walk. Despite its name it is not rectangular. At its northern end is the Old White Bear pub dating back to 1704, on the corner with Well Road. Its southern end is at the junction between Flask Walk and Well Walk. New End street curls off from one corner of the square, eventually heading west to Heath Street.

It is known as New End to distinguish it from older parts of Hampstead village. The largest building is Burgh House, now housing the Hampstead Museum, which dates back to 1704. A number of other buildings, dating back to the eighteenth and early nineteenth century, are now Grade II listed.

New End street was developed at the same time as the square, and was once home to the New End Hospital and the later New End Theatre. The Duke of Hamilton pub is located in the street.

== Bibliography ==
- Bebbington, Gillian. London Street Names. Batsford, 1972.
- Cherry, Bridget & Pevsner, Nikolaus. London 4: North. Yale University Press, 2002.
- McMurdo, Lucy. Hampstead & Highgate in 50 Buildings. Amberley Publishing Limited, 2022.
- Wade, Christopher. The Streets of Hampstead. Camden History Society, 2000.
