= The Logs =

House in Hampstead, London, England

Coordinates: 51.5603°N 0.1736°W

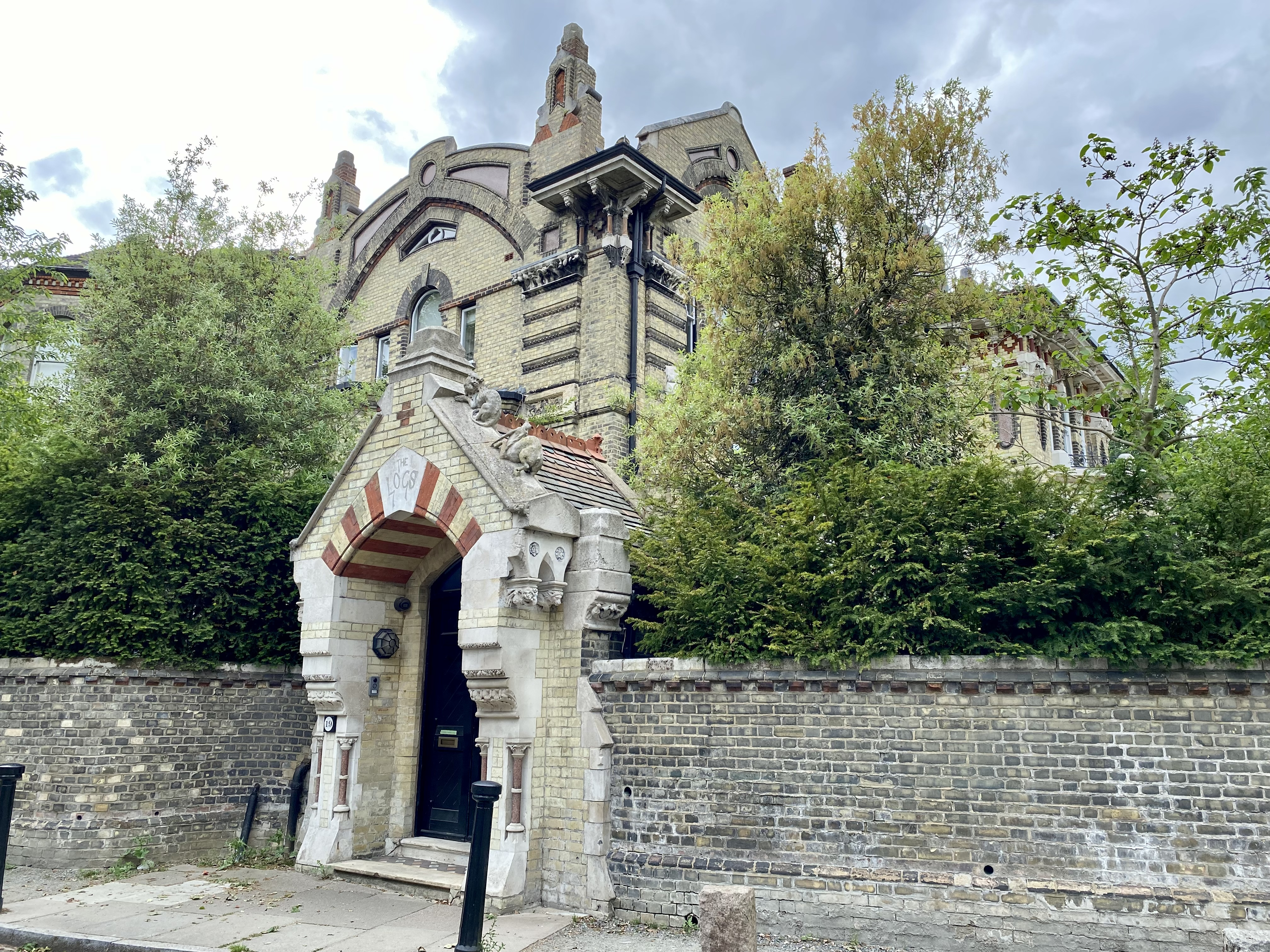
The elaborate entrance to The Logs from Well Road

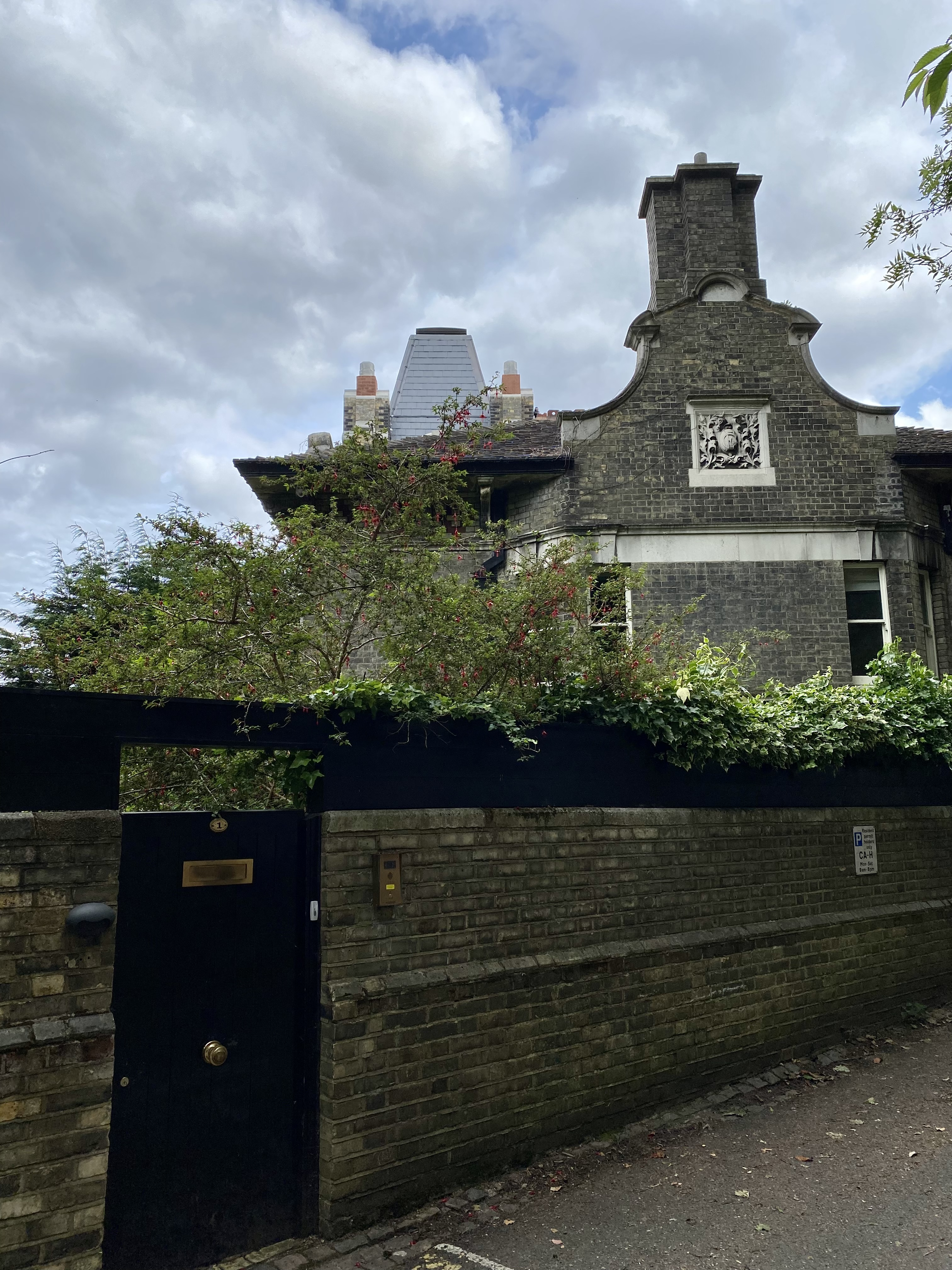
The rear of The Logs from Cannon Lane

The Logs at 17–20 Well Road and 1, 2 and 3 Cannon Lane is a large house in Hampstead, in the London Borough of Camden, NW3. The Logs has been listed Grade II on the National Heritage List for England since May 1974.

== Location ==
The Logs is situated at the corner of Well Road and Cannon Lane, adjacent to East Heath Road.

== History ==
The Logs was built c.1868 to designs by J.S. Nightingale by the builder Charles Till for the engineer and developer Edward Gotto as Gotto's own residence. Gotto later added wings on either side of the house in 1876. A full-page illustration and a profile of The Logs was featured in the 28 November 1868 issue of The Builder. The house cost £9,000 to build (equivalent to £879,915 in 2025).

The house was for sale with freehold for £10,000 in 1923 (equivalent to £522,825 in 2025) through Knight, Frank and Rutley. It was described as a "substantial and fairly modern house, with gardens of over an acre, near the highest part of East Heath-road."

The house was subdivided in maisonettes in 1951, the conversion was discussed in the 1955 book The Conversion of Old Buildings Into New Homes for Occupation and Investment. The grand central staircase of the house was preserved in the conversion. During its subdivision the house was partly known as Lion House. A gabled stone gateway to 19 Well Road has a pointed arch bearing the name "Lion House" with carvings of animals resembling lions.

The comedian Marty Feldman lived at The Logs for several years. The musician and performer Boy George has lived at The Logs since the 1980s. In 2015 a planning application to build an extension to improve the levels of natural light at the house with new floor to ceiling windows and to landscape the garden was rejected by Camden Borough Council. Syte Architects who were commissioned to produce the plans wrote that The Logs "...does not benefit from a great deal of natural light into its interior. Its frontage is orientated to the north east. The rear has a southwesterly orientation but a combination of factors mean that the interior often suffers from poor levels and quality of natural lighting". The council's planning department described the changes as "over-dominant and incongruous addition, detrimental to the character and appearance of the host building and wider conservation area". The designs were also opposed by the Hampstead Conservation Area Advisory Committee (CCAC). The landscaping works planned to remove an existing summer house and three mature trees.

In September 2022, the subdivision on 17/18 Well Road was listed for sale at £17 million.

== Design ==
The eccentric design of The Logs has been much commented on. Nikolaus Pevsner writing in the London: North edition of the Pevsner Architectural Guides describes The Logs as a "formidable atrocity". Christopher Wade, writing in The Streets of Hampstead describes it as a "wonderful uncertainty between Gothic and Italian". Pevsner described The Logs as exhibiting "yellow, red and black brick and exscrecences in all directions, arches pointed and round, motifs Gothic and Frenchified, and a remarkable wilful tower with chateau roof'.

The hall, vestibule and conservatory were paved with Mintons tiles upon completion. Burnham bricks with Portland stone dressings were used on the exterior alongside polished granite and red Mansfield stone. Portland stone was used for the staircase, and the drawing room, dining room and library feature pitched pine ribs.
