= Burgh House =

Grade I listed local museum in London Borough of Camden, United Kingdom

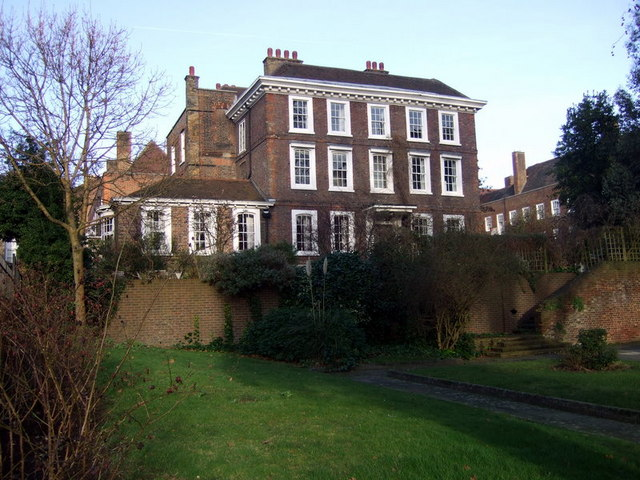
- Burgh House seen from the south east on Well Walk

- Location within London Borough of Camden
- 51°33′30″N 0°10′30″W
- Location: New End Square, Hampstead
- OS grid reference: TQ 2661 8595

History
- Built: 1704

Site notes
- Area: London Borough of Camden
- Architectural style: Queen Anne
- Governing body: Burgh House Trust
- Owner: London Borough of Camden

Listed Building – Grade I
- Official name: Burgh House
- Designated: 11 August 1950
- Reference no.: 1113163

Burgh House is a historic house located on New End Square in Hampstead, London, that includes the Hampstead Museum. The house is also listed as Burgh House & Hampstead Museum.

== Brief history ==
Burgh House was constructed in 1704 during the reign of Queen Anne. At the time of construction the Hampstead Wells Spa was flourishing. In 1720 the Spa's physician, Dr. William Gibbons, moved to Burgh House, which he enlarged. He added the present wrought-iron gate which carries his initials.

One inhabitant of the house was Israel Lewis, who was an upholsterer. He was involved in a court case in which he was found guilty of creating a nuisance by "making an inclosed Dung stall" in his garden, and was fined £5 and made to remove it. Until the 1870s the house was known as Lewis House.

In 1858 Burgh House was taken over by the Royal East Middlesex Militia, and served as the headquarters and officers' mess until 1881. The house returned to domestic use in 1884.

From 1906–24 the house was occupied by Dr. George Williamson, an international art expert. He commissioned Gertrude Jekyll to design the garden, although only the terrace now remains.

In 1925, a director of Lloyds Bank, Captain Constantine Evelyn Benson CBE, DSO, bought the house for £4,750. He built the present music room on the site of Dr. Williamson's library.

Between 1933–37, Rudyard Kipling's daughter, Elsie Bambridge lived in Burgh House with her husband, Captain George Bambridge. Rudyard Kipling's last outing in 1936 was to Burgh House, to visit his daughter.

From 1937–46 Burgh House was unoccupied. It was bought and restored by Hampstead Borough Council in 1946. The barrack blocks in front of the building were pulled down and in 1947 it reopened as a community centre with a Citizen's Advice Bureau in its basement.

The house was again closed indefinitely in 1977 when its new owners, Camden Council, discovered dry rot in the building. Threatened with proposals to turn the house over to a commercial use, local residents formed a charitable trust and launched a "Keep Burgh House" appeal, as a result of which Camden Council granted them a lease for the house. On 8 September 1979, the house, restored by the council and refurbished by the trust, opened to the public as the house and museum that it is today.

== Hampstead Museum ==
In recent years it has been further restored with backing from The Heritage Lottery Fund, Bridge House Trust and many local benefactors. The refurbished building opened to the public on 16 July 2006. Burgh House has the world's largest archive and collection of Helen Allingham's work. The first floor houses the Hampstead Museum, with permanent exhibits on local history and culture. There are also first floor and ground galleries for temporary exhibits of art, local history and culture. A cafe occupies the basement, with outside seating in the gardens.

Burgh House currently hosts exhibitions and concerts, and is hired for weddings, receptions and other private events.
