= The Duke of Hamilton =

Pub in London, England

Coordinates: 51°33′32″N 0°10′39″W

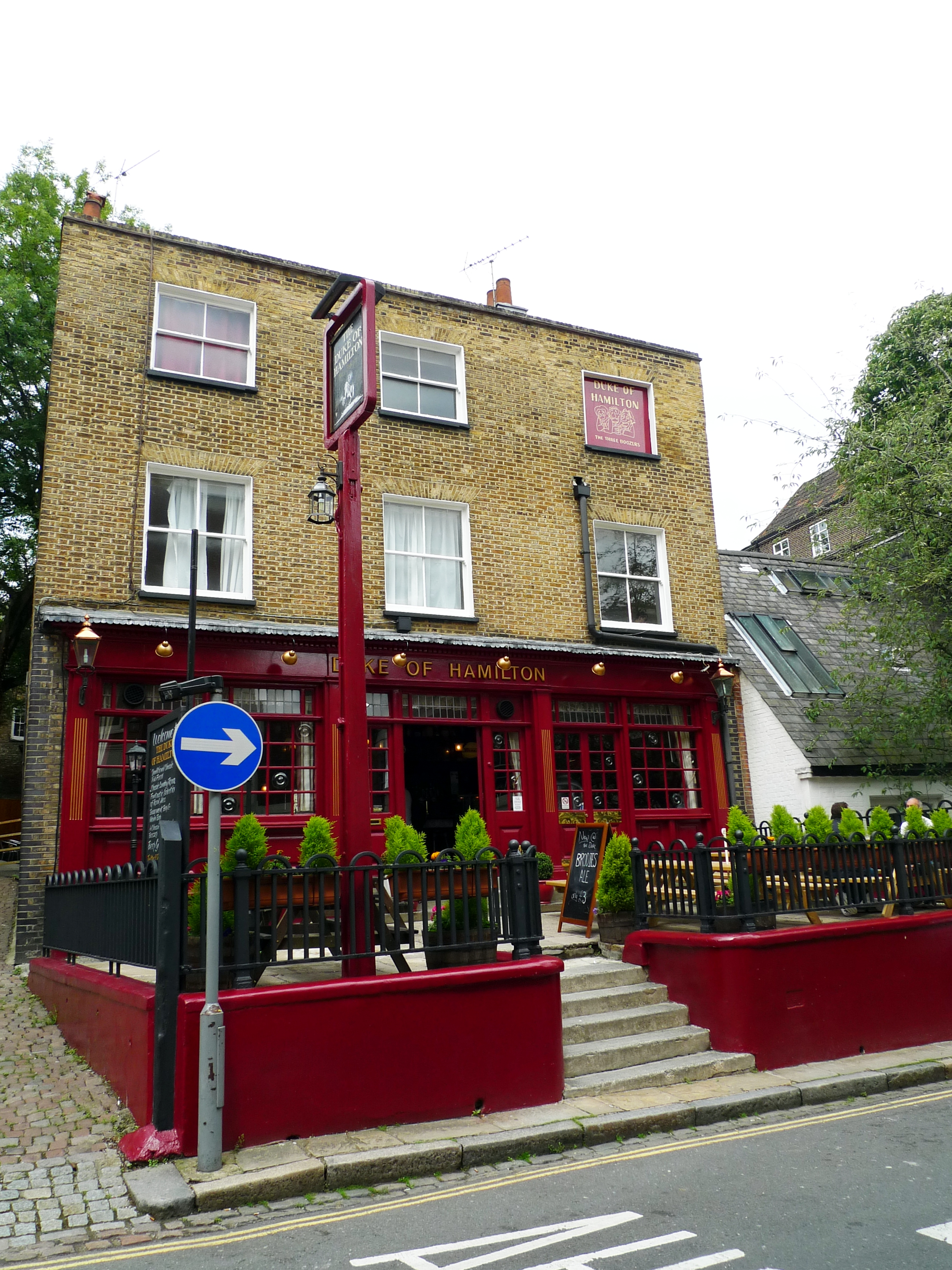
The Duke of Hamilton

The Duke of Hamilton is one of the oldest pubs in London, England. It is located in New End street in Hampstead.

In 2011, the pub was awarded "Londoner of the Day" by London 24 magazine. The Not For Tourists Guide to London 2014 cited it as being "as good a pub you're likely to find anywhere".

The pub closed in July 2017, and was reopened in early 2018 as the "Hampstead Lounge & Jazz Club". However, Loci Pubs took over the pub and it is now back under its previous name and operating as a pub.

== See also ==
- List of pubs in London
