= Old White Bear =

Pub in Hampstead, London, England

Coordinates: 51.5587°N 0.1756°W

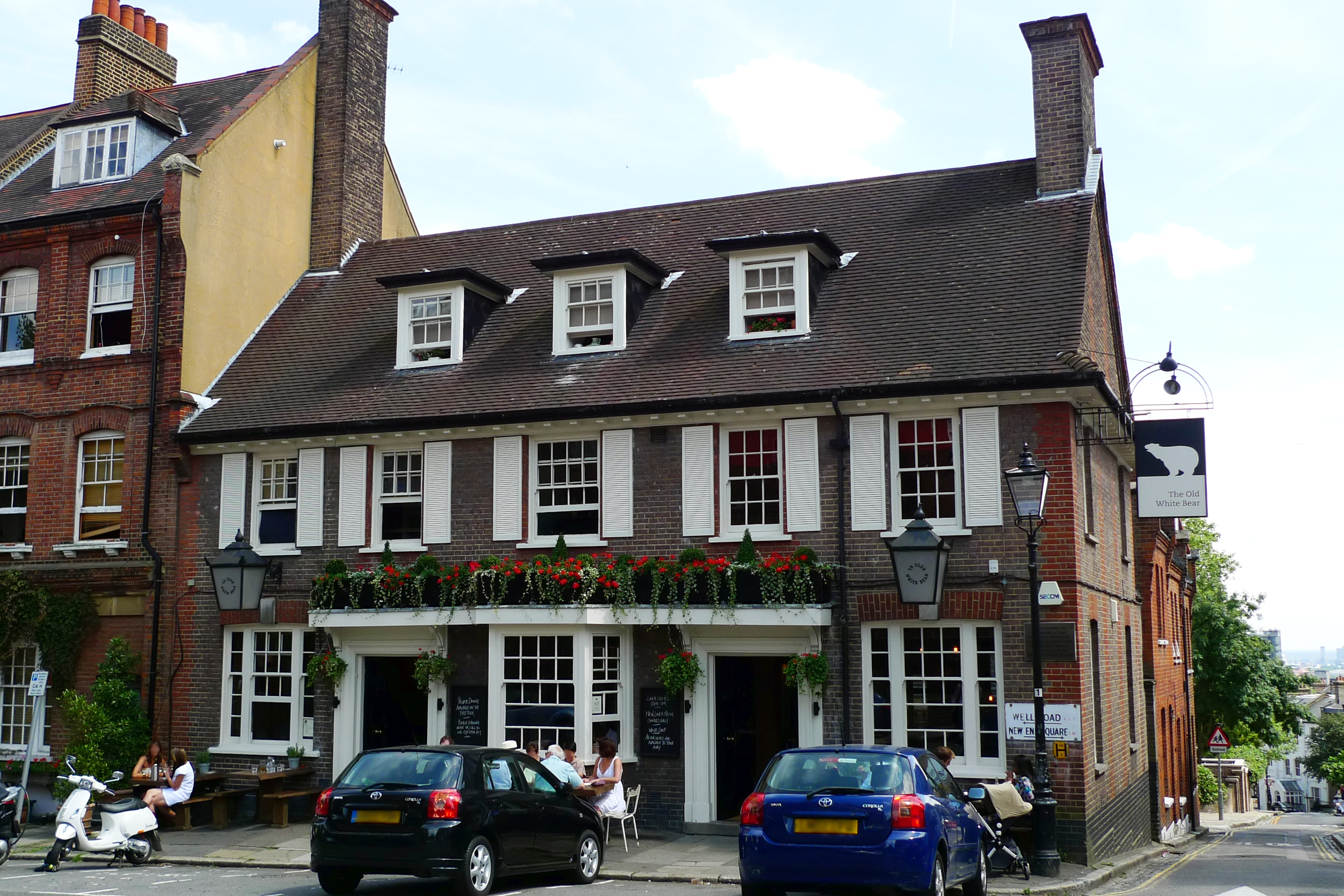
The Old White Bear

The Old White Bear is a pub at 1 Well Road, Hampstead, in the London Borough of Camden on the corner with New End Square.

It dates back to 1704, but closed on 2 February 2014, as the property developer Braaid Ventures Ltd tried to obtain a change of use application to turn it into a six-bedroom luxury house. Camden Council rejected this, and it was set to reopen as a pub eight months later, following community protests and a petition signed by 4,000 people and supported by the actors Ricky Gervais and Peter Egan. The pub reopened on 15 December 2021.
