= Weird Islands =

Fantasy novel published in 1921

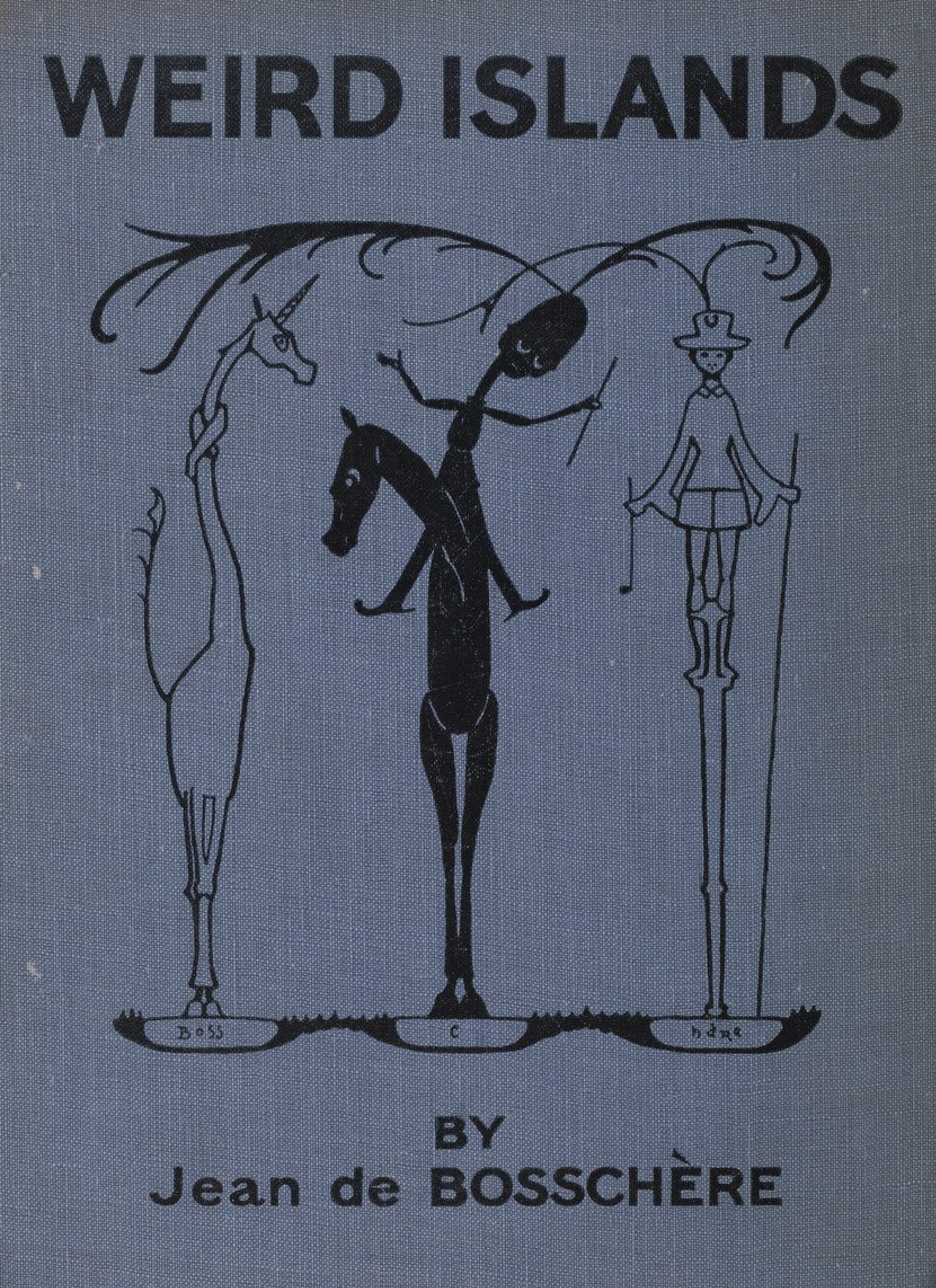
- First edition cover
- Author: Jean de Bosschère
- Cover artist: Jean de Bosschère
- Genre: Fantasy
- Publisher: Chapman and Hall
- Publication date: 1921
- Publication place: United Kingdom
- Media type: Print (hardcover)
- Pages: 210

Weird Islands is a surrealist children's fantasy novel written and illustrated by Jean de Bosschère, and first published in 1921. The story follows The Carpenter and nine other eccentric musicians as they travel through several islands inhabited by unique and strange creatures. The book has been compared to Alice in Wonderland and Gulliver's Travels.

Each of the 120 black-and-white drawings present throughout the novel were drawn by de Bosschère, who stated that each drawing was an integral part of the narrative rather than "mere illustration". The drawings are in Belgian Art Nouveau style.
