= Hampstead =

Area of Camden in London, England

Coordinates: 51.5541°N 0.1744°W

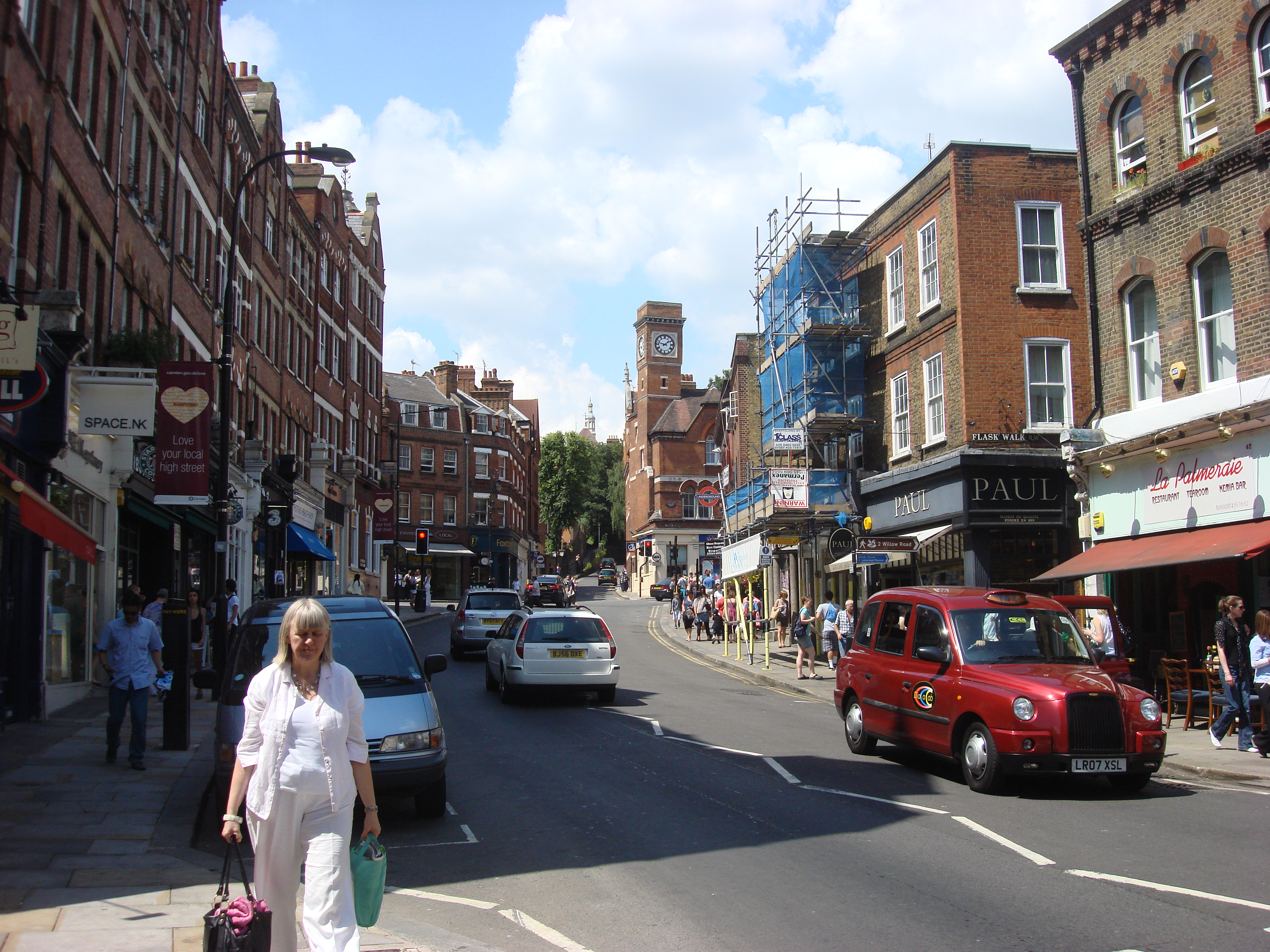
- Hampstead High Street in 2009

- Location within Greater London
- OS grid reference: TQ265855
- London borough: Camden; Barnet
- Ceremonial county: Greater London
- Region: London
- Country: England
- Sovereign state: United Kingdom
- Post town: LONDON
- Postcode district: NW3
- Dialling code: 020
- Police: Metropolitan
- Fire: London
- Ambulance: London
- UK Parliament: Hampstead and Highgate
- London Assembly: Barnet and Camden

Hampstead (/ˈhæmpstɪd, -stɛd/) is an area in London, England, which lies 4 miles (6.4 km) northwest of Charing Cross, located mainly in the London Borough of Camden, with a small part in the London Borough of Barnet. It borders Highgate and Golders Green to the north, Belsize Park to the south and is surrounded from the northeast by Hampstead Heath, a large, hilly expanse of parkland.

Hampstead is known for its intellectual, artistic, liberal, and literary associations. It contains a number of listed buildings, such as Burgh House, Kenwood House, the Spaniard's Inn, and the Everyman cinema. With some of the most expensive housing in London, Hampstead has had many notable residents, both past and present, including King Constantine II of Greece and his wife Queen Anne Marie, Helena Bonham Carter, Agatha Christie, T. S. Eliot, Jon English, Sigmund Freud, Stephen Fry, Ricky Gervais, Jim Henson, George Orwell, Harry Styles, Tim Burton, Martin Freeman and Elizabeth Taylor. As of 2004, Hampstead has been home to more Prime Ministers, and contains more millionaires within its boundaries, than any other area of the United Kingdom.

Inhabited since at least the Anglo-Saxons period, Hampstead is one of the oldest areas in London. From the 17th century it became popular as a resort away from the capital, especially for the affluent. The area has been contained within many metropolitan governments since the 13th century, ending with the dissolution of the Metropolitan Borough of Hampstead into the London Borough of Camden in 1965. Since then, it has become a major tourist destination within Camden, owing to its many historical sites and high street.

== History ==
Area of the Parish and Metropolitan Borough of Hampstead

=== Toponymy ===
The name comes from the Anglo-Saxon words ham and stede, which means, and is a cognate of, the Modern English "homestead".

=== To 1900 ===
Archeological findings from Hampstead Heath, including Mesolithic flint tools, pits, postholes, and burnt stones, indicate a hunter-gatherer community around 7000 BCE. Objects like cinerary urns and grave goods discovered near Well Walk, dating back to 70–120 CE, suggest the possibility of a Roman settlement or road in the vicinity.

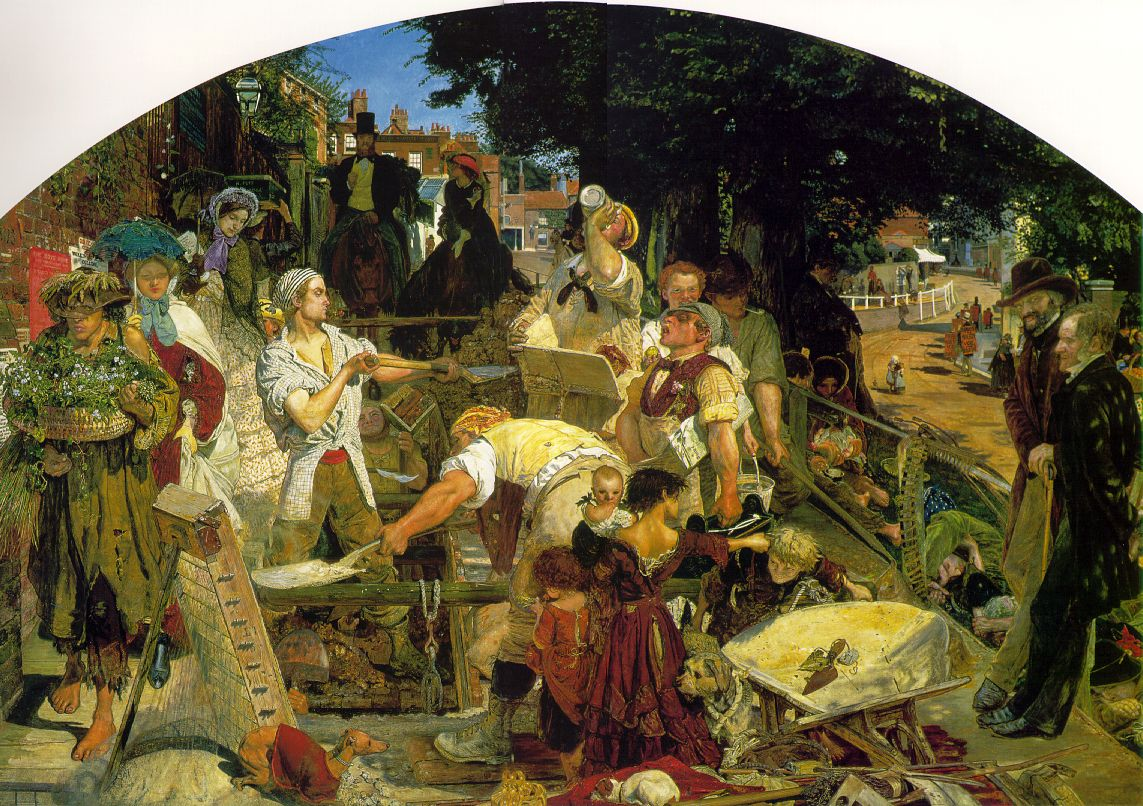
Roadworks on Heath Street in Hampstead around 1865, in Ford Madox Brown's painting Work

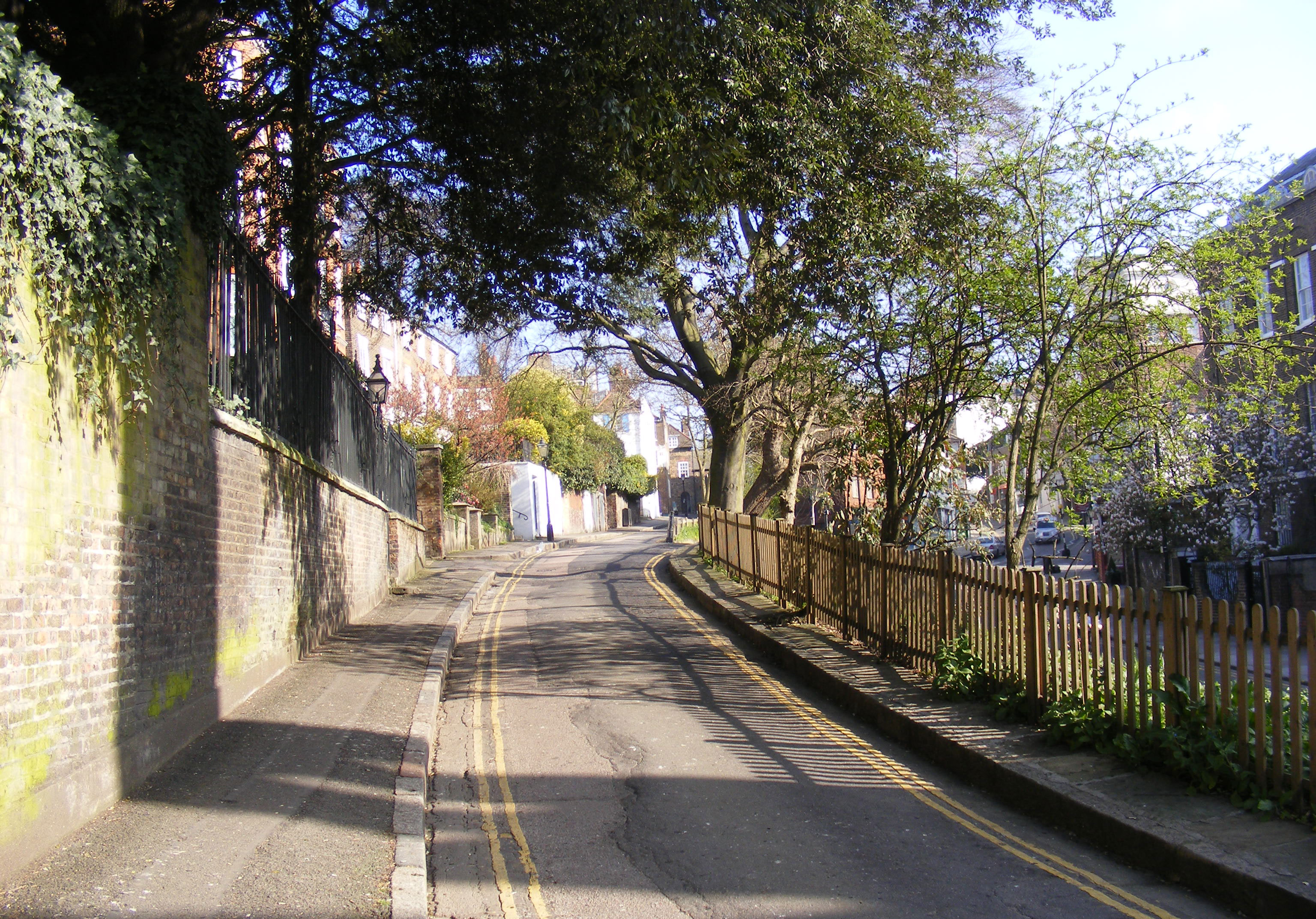
2010 view of the location used for the Madox Brown painting on The Mount, just off Heath St

Early records of Hampstead can be found in a grant by King Ethelred the Unready to the monastery of St. Peter's at Westminster (AD 986), and it is referred to in the Domesday Book (1086) as being in the Middlesex hundred of Ossulstone. Outlying hamlets developed at West End and North End. In addition, Pond Street formed the southern limit of the settlement for many centuries.

The growth of Hampstead is generally traced back to the seventeenth century. Trustees of the Well started advertising the medicinal qualities of the chalybeate waters (mineral water impregnated with iron) in 1700. A pump room and assembly room were established on Well Walk, supplied by water from springs in nearby Well Road. Elegant housing was built in New End road, New End Square and Church Row. Although Hampstead Wells was initially most successful and fashionable, its popularity declined in the nineteenth century due to competition with other fashionable London spas. The spa was demolished in 1882, although a water fountain was left behind.

Hampstead started to expand following the opening of the North London Railway in the 1860s (now the London Overground with passenger services operated by Transport for London), and expanded further after the Charing Cross, Euston & Hampstead Railway opened in 1907 (now part of London Underground's Northern line) and provided fast travel to central London.

Much luxurious housing was created during the 1870s and 1880s, in the area that is now the political ward of Frognal & Fitzjohns. Much of this housing remains to this day.

=== 20th century ===
In the 20th century, a number of notable buildings were created including:

- Hampstead Underground station (1907), the deepest station on the Underground network
- Isokon building (1932)
- Hillfield Court (1932)
- 2 Willow Road (1938)
- Swiss Cottage Central Library (1964)
- Royal Free Hospital (mid-1970s)

Cultural attractions in the area include the Freud Museum, Keats House, Kenwood House, Fenton House, the Isokon building, Burgh House (which also houses Hampstead Museum), and the Camden Arts Centre. The large Victorian Hampstead Town Hall was recently converted and extended as an arts centre.

On 14 August 1975, Hampstead entered the UK Weather Records with the Highest 155-min total rainfall at 169 mm. As of November 2008, this record remains unbroken.

The average price of a property in Hampstead was £1.5 million in 2018.

== Geography ==
A map showing the wards of Hampstead Metropolitan Borough as they appeared in 1916

Hampstead became part of the County of London in 1889 and in 1899 the Metropolitan Borough of Hampstead was formed. The Town Hall on Haverstock Hill, which was also the location of the Register Office, can be seen in newsreel footage of many celebrity civil marriages. In 1965, the metropolitan borough was abolished and its area merged with that of the Metropolitan Borough of Holborn and the Metropolitan Borough of St Pancras to form the modern-day London Borough of Camden.

For some, the area represented by Hampstead today consists principally of the (electoral) wards of Hampstead Town and Frognal & Fitzjohns; others espouse a broader definition, encompassing South Hampstead, Belsize Park and West Hampstead.

=== Climate ===
Climate data for Hampstead (1991–2020)
Month	Jan	Feb	Mar	Apr	May	Jun	Jul	Aug	Sep	Oct	Nov	Dec	Year
Mean daily maximum °C (°F)	7.5 (45.5)	8.1 (46.6)	10.9 (51.6)	14.1 (57.4)	17.3 (63.1)	20.4 (68.7)	22.7 (72.9)	22.3 (72.1)	19.1 (66.4)	14.8 (58.6)	10.6 (51.1)	7.8 (46.0)	14.7 (58.5)
Mean daily minimum °C (°F)	2.3 (36.1)	2.2 (36.0)	3.7 (38.7)	5.5 (41.9)	8.3 (46.9)	11.2 (52.2)	13.3 (55.9)	13.3 (55.9)	11.1 (52.0)	8.3 (46.9)	5.0 (41.0)	2.7 (36.9)	7.3 (45.1)
Average rainfall mm (inches)	69.5 (2.74)	51.4 (2.02)	42.8 (1.69)	49.6 (1.95)	50.5 (1.99)	58.5 (2.30)	50.5 (1.99)	67.7 (2.67)	59.1 (2.33)	78.6 (3.09)	75.7 (2.98)	68.2 (2.69)	722.1 (28.43)
Average rainy days (≥ 1 mm)	12.1	10.7	9.1	9.1	8.5	8.7	8.4	9.2	9.0	11.0	11.9	11.9	119.6
Mean monthly sunshine hours	60.0	76.1	114.2	155.2	199.2	193.7	199.8	188.2	145.5	106.3	67.2	54.0	1,559.4
Source: Met Office

== Politics ==
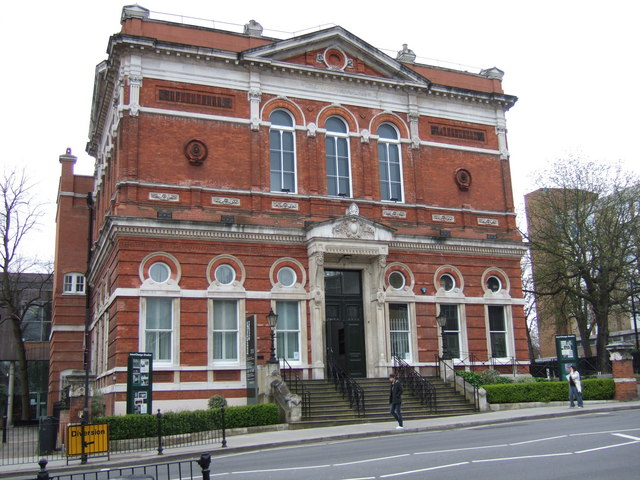
The former Hampstead Town Hall on Haverstock Hill

Hampstead is part of the Hampstead and Highgate constituency, re-established at the 2024 general election. The seat, and its predecessor, has been held by Labour since 1992, and is currently represented by Tulip Siddiq.

=== Hampstead Liberalism ===
The area has a significant tradition of educated liberal humanism, sometimes referred to (often disparagingly) as "Hampstead Liberalism". In the 1960s, the figure of the Hampstead Liberal was notoriously satirised by Peter Simple of the Daily Telegraph in the character of Mrs Dutt-Pauker, an immensely wealthy aristocratic socialist whose fictitious Hampstead mansion, Marxmount House, contained an original pair of Bukharin's false teeth on display alongside precious Ming vases, neo-constructivist art, and the complete writings of Stalin. Michael Idov of The New Yorker stated that the community "was the citadel of the moneyed liberal intelligentsia, posh but not stuffy." As applied to an individual, the term "Hampstead Liberal" is not synonymous with "champagne socialist" but carries some of the same connotations. The term is also rather misleading.

As of 2025, the component wards of Hampstead (South Hampstead, Frognal, Hampstead Town and Belsize) have mixed representation. Frognal ward elects two Conservative councillors, Belsize ward elects three Liberal Democrat councillors, South Hampstead elects three Labour councillors, while Hampstead Town is represented by one Liberal Democrat and one Conservative councillor.

South Hampstead is a competitive Labour and Conservative marginal, and Belsize is competitive between the Liberal Democrats and the Conservatives, whereas Frognal is a safe Conservative ward. Hampstead Town (including the area of Hampstead Village and South End Green) has seen a number of tightly fought Conservative and Liberal Democrat contests, and the ward has had mixed representation in recent decades.

=== Brexit referendum ===
During the 2016 United Kingdom European Union membership referendum, 75% of voters across the London Borough of Camden voted to remain in the EU. Following the result many commentators used Hampstead as an archetype of the type of area that preferred to remain in the EU. This point was often made in alliterative contrast to poor post-industrial northern towns such as Hartlepool and Hull, that preferred to leave.

== Places of interest ==
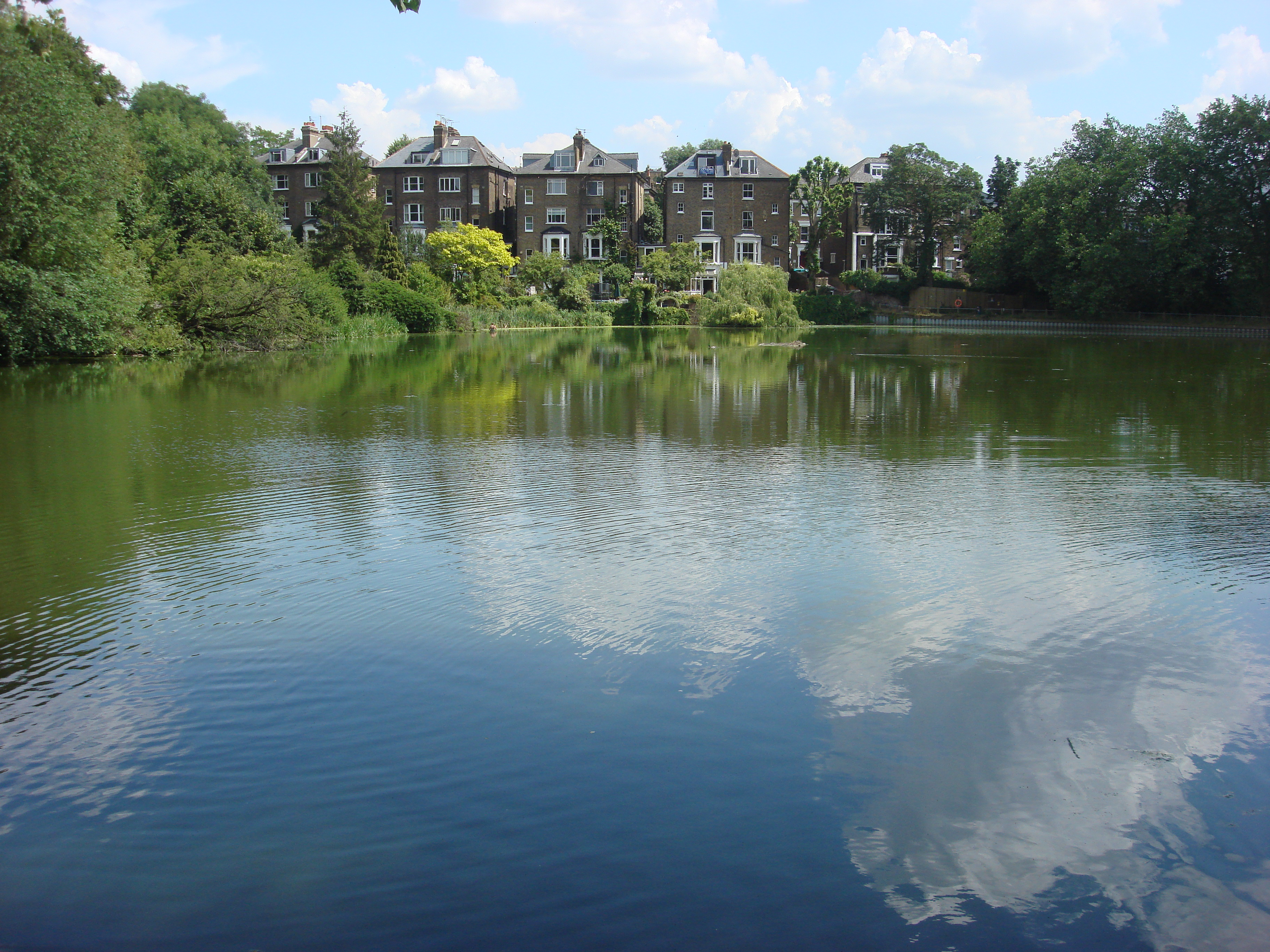
Hampstead Heath west ponds

Red Arches (The Viaduct)

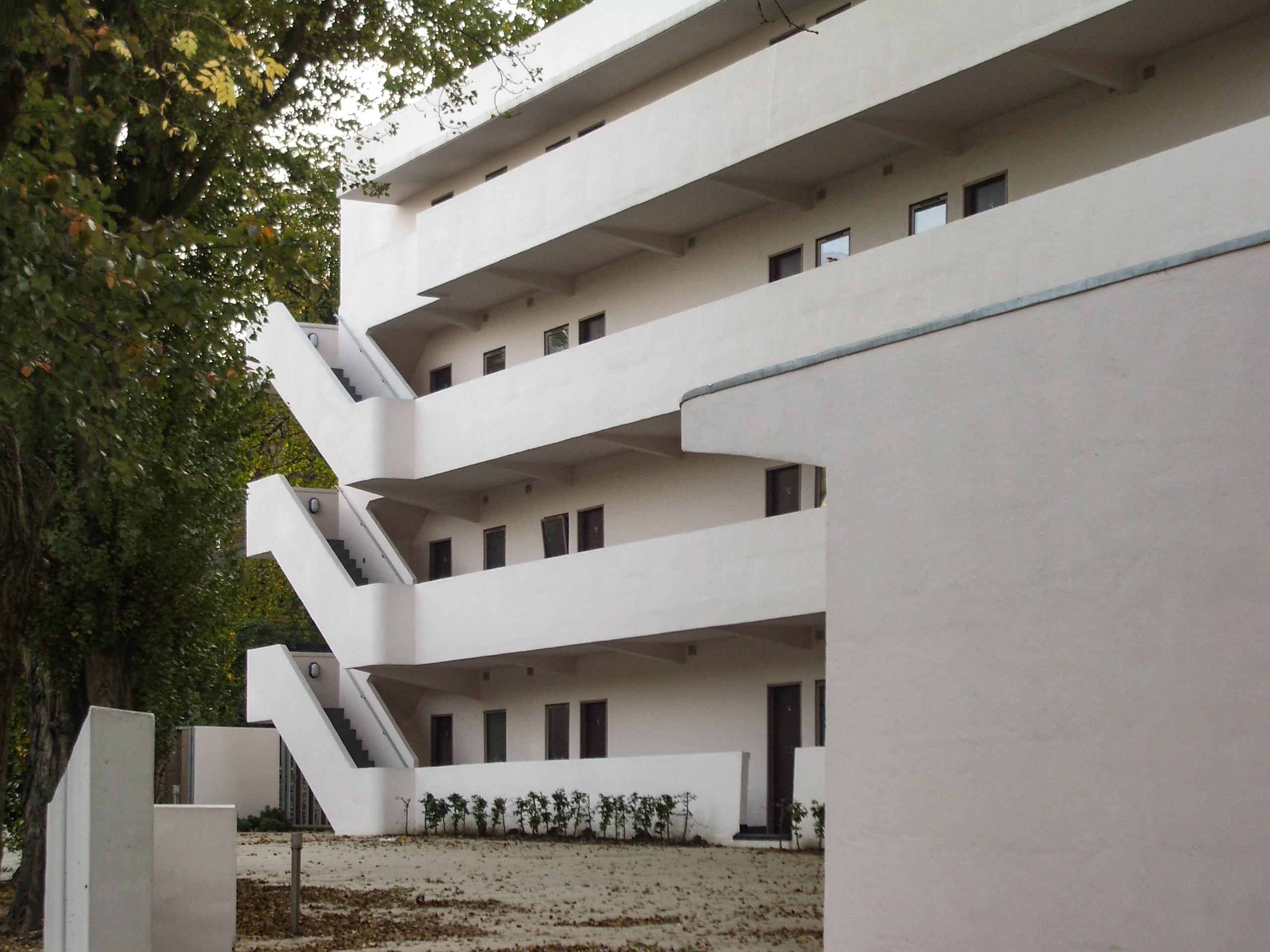
Isokon Building, Hampstead

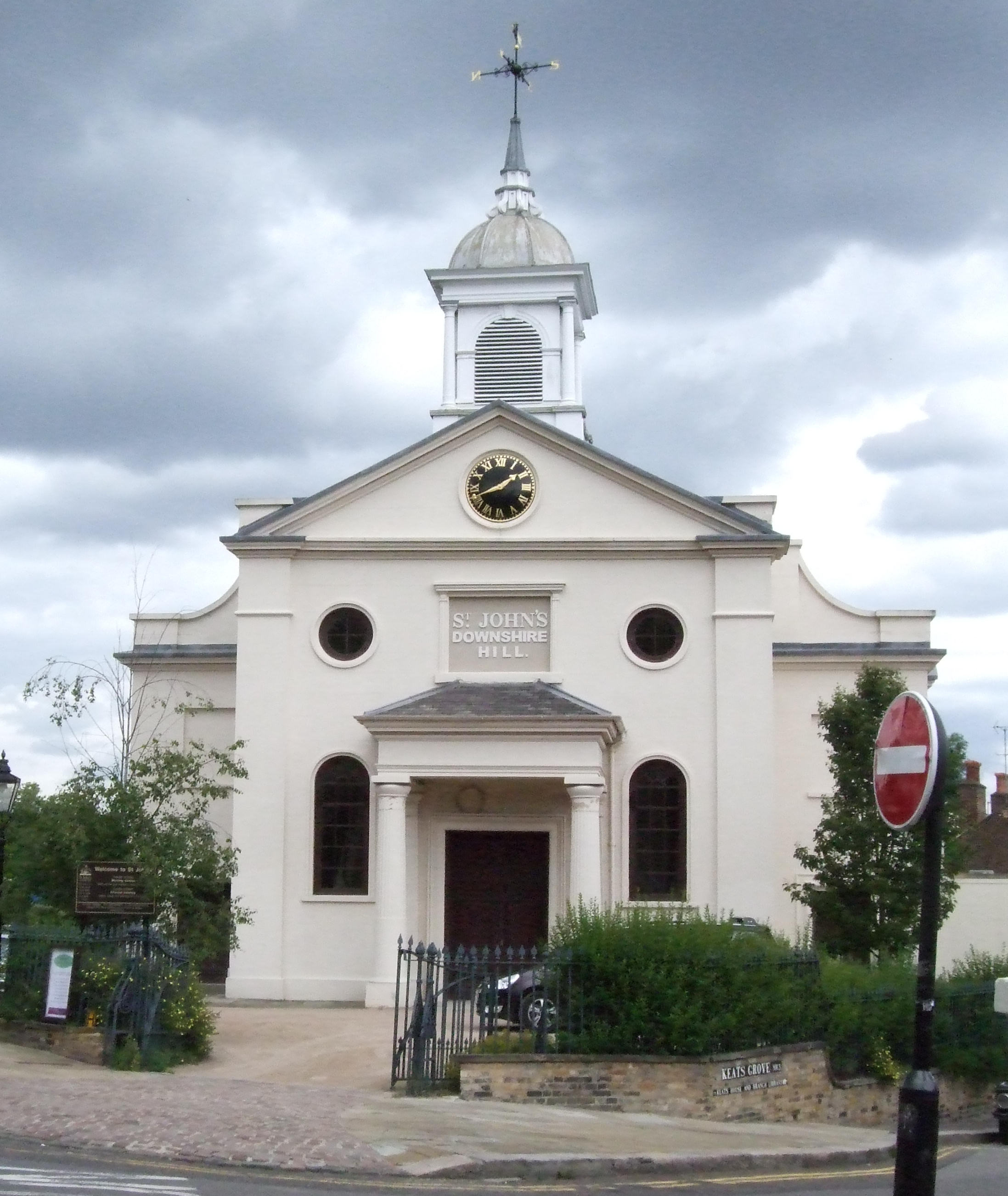
St John's Church, Downshire Hill

=== Sites ===
To the north and east of Hampstead, and separating it from Highgate, is London's largest ancient parkland, Hampstead Heath, which includes the well-known and legally protected view of the London skyline from Parliament Hill. The Heath, a major place for Londoners to walk and "take the air", has three open-air public swimming ponds; one for men, one for women, and one for mixed bathing, which were originally reservoirs for drinking water and the sources of the River Fleet. The bridge pictured is known locally as 'The Red Arches' or 'The Viaduct', built in fruitless anticipation of residential building on the Heath in the 19th century.

Local activities include major open-air concerts on summer Saturday evenings on the slopes below Kenwood House, the FT Weekend Festival, book and poetry readings, fun fairs on the lower reaches of the Heath, period harpsichord recitals at Fenton House, Hampstead Scientific Society and Hampstead Photographic Society.

The largest employer in Hampstead is the Royal Free Hospital, Pond Street, but many small businesses based in the area have international significance. George Martin's AIR recording studios, in converted church premises in Lyndhurst Road, is a current example, as Jim Henson's Creature Shop was before it relocated to California.

The area has some remarkable architecture, such as the Isokon building in Lawn Road, a Grade I listed experiment in collective housing, once home to Agatha Christie, Henry Moore, Ben Nicholson and Walter Gropius. It was recently restored by Notting Hill Housing Trust.

=== Churches and synagogues ===
- Christ Church – Hampstead Square, NW3 1AB
- Heath Street Baptist Church, Heath Street, NW3 1DN
- St. Andrew's United Reformed Church, Frognal Lane, NW3 7DY
- St John-at-Hampstead – Church Row, NW3 6UU
- St John's Downshire Hill – Downshire Hill, NW3 1NU
- St Luke's – Kidderpore Avenue, NW3 7SU
- St Mary's Church (Roman Catholic)– 4 Holly Place, NW3 6QU
- Rosslyn Hill Unitarian Chapel – Pilgrim's Place, NW3 1NG
- Village Shul, synagogue, located at 27 New End, Hampstead.
- St Stephen's, Rosslyn Hill – A deconsecrated Church of England church on Pond Street, originally built in 1869 by Samuel Sanders Teulon, won an English Heritage award for the restoration of buildings at risk.

=== Museums ===
- Fenton House – Hampstead Grove, Hampstead, London, NW3 6SP
- Freud Museum – 20 Maresfield Gardens, Hampstead, London, NW3 5SX
- Burgh House & Hampstead Museum – New End Square, Hampstead, London, NW3 1LT
- Keats House Museum – Keats Grove, Hampstead, London, NW3 2RR
- Kenwood House – Hampstead Lane, Hampstead, London, NW3 7JR

=== Theatres and cinemas ===
- Everyman Cinema, Hampstead – 5 Holly Bush Vale, Hampstead, London, NW3 6TX
- Hampstead Theatre – Eton Avenue, Swiss Cottage, London, NW3 3EU
- Pentameters Theatre – 28 Heath Street, Hampstead, London, NW3 6TE

=== Art Galleries ===
Hampstead was once home to many art galleries but few are now left. The Catto Gallery has been in Hampstead since 1986 and has represented artists like Ian Berry, Philip Jackson, Chuck Elliott, Walasse Ting, and Sergei Chepik over the years.

- Catto Gallery – 100 Heath Street, Hampstead, London NW3 1DP
- Gilden's Art Gallery, 74, Heath Street, London NW3 1DN
- Zebra One Gallery,– 1 Perrin's Court, Hampstead, London, NW3 1QX

=== Public houses ===
Hampstead is well known for its traditional pubs, such as The Holly Bush, gas-lit until recently; the Spaniard's Inn, Spaniard's Road, where highwayman Dick Turpin took refuge; The Old Bull and Bush in North End; and The Old White Bear (formerly Ye Olde White Bear). Jack Straw's Castle, on the edge of the Heath near Whitestone Pond, has now been converted into residential flats. Others include:

- The Flask – 14 Flask Walk, Hampstead, London, NW3 1HE
- Freemasons Arms – 32 Downshire Hill, Hampstead, London, NW3 1NT
- The Duke of Hamilton – 23–25 New End, Hampstead, London, NW3 1JD
- The Horseshoe (formerly The Three Horseshoes) – 28 Heath Street, Hampstead, London, NW3 6TE
- King William IV (aka KW4) – 77 Hampstead High Street, Hampstead, London, NW3 1RE
- The Magdala – 2a South Hill Park, Hampstead, London, NW3 2SB
- The Garden Gate – 14 South End Road, Hampstead, London, NW3 2QE
- The Wells Tavern – 30 Well Walk, Hampstead, London NW3 1BX

=== Restaurants ===
Hampstead has served as a testing ground for a number of cafes and restaurants that later became successful chains. Those include Giraffe World Kitchen, Gail's and 'Bagel Street'. As a consequence, Hampstead has an eclectic mix of restaurants ranging from French to Thai. After over a decade of controversy and legal action from local residents, McDonald's was finally allowed to open in Hampstead in 1992, after winning its right in court, and agreeing to a previously unprecedented re-design of the shop front, reducing the conspicuousness of its facade and logo, It closed in November 2013. Popular local eateries also include street food vendors, such as La Creperie de Hampstead, which is often frequented by domestic and global celebrities.

=== Film locations ===
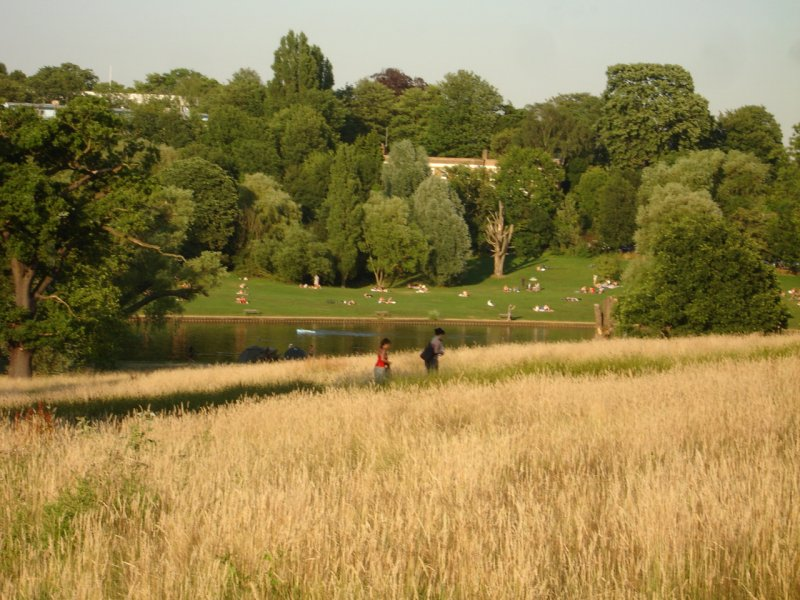
East Heath

Hampstead's rural feel lends itself for use in film, a notable example being The Killing of Sister George (1968) starring Beryl Reid and Susannah York. The opening sequence has Reid's character June wandering through the streets and alleyways of Hampstead, west of Heath Street, around The Mount Square. The Marquis of Granby pub, in which June drinks at the opening of the film, was actually The Holly Bush, at 22 Holly Mount. Another example is The Collector (1965), starring Terence Stamp and Samantha Eggar, where the kidnap sequence is set in Mount Vernon.

Some scenes from An American Werewolf in London (1981) are shot on Hampstead Heath, Well Walk and Haverstock Hill.

More recently Kenwood House is the set of the "film-within-the-film" scene of Notting Hill (1999). Outdoor scenes in The Wedding Date (2005), starring Debra Messing, feature Parliament Hill Fields on the Heath, overlooking west London. Parliament Hill also features in Notes on a Scandal (2006) together with the nearby areas of Gospel Oak and Camden Town. Four Weddings and a Funeral (1994) features the old Hampstead Town Hall on Haverstock Hill. The film Scenes of a Sexual Nature (2006) was filmed entirely on Hampstead Heath, covering various picturesque locations such as the 'Floating Gardens' and Kenwood House.

A musical specifically focusing on the area, Les Bicyclettes de Belsize (1968), tells the story of a young man's cycle journey around Hampstead. After crashing into a billboard poster, he falls in love with the fashion model depicted on it. In February 2016, principal photography for Robert Zemeckis' war film Allied starring Brad Pitt and Marion Cotillard, began with the family home located on the corners of Christchurch Hill and Willow Road in Hampstead.

Cruella de Vil Mansion (Sarum Chase) is on the West Heath Road in movies 101 Dalmatians (1996) and 102 Dalmatians (2001).

Bridget Jones: Mad About the Boy (2025) has Bridget and her two children living in Hampstead in the home she had shared with her late husband, Mark Darcy. Multiple locations in Hampstead were used in the filming.

== Demography ==
The 2021 census showed that the population of Hampstead Town ward was 77.7% white (46.7% British, 28% Other, 2.4% Irish). The largest non-white group, Asian, claimed 8.9%. The religious data of the area showed that 32.6% was Christian, 37.9% irreligious and 11% Jewish. 2.7% of the population was unemployed and seeking work; this compared to 5.1% for the wider borough.

== Transport ==
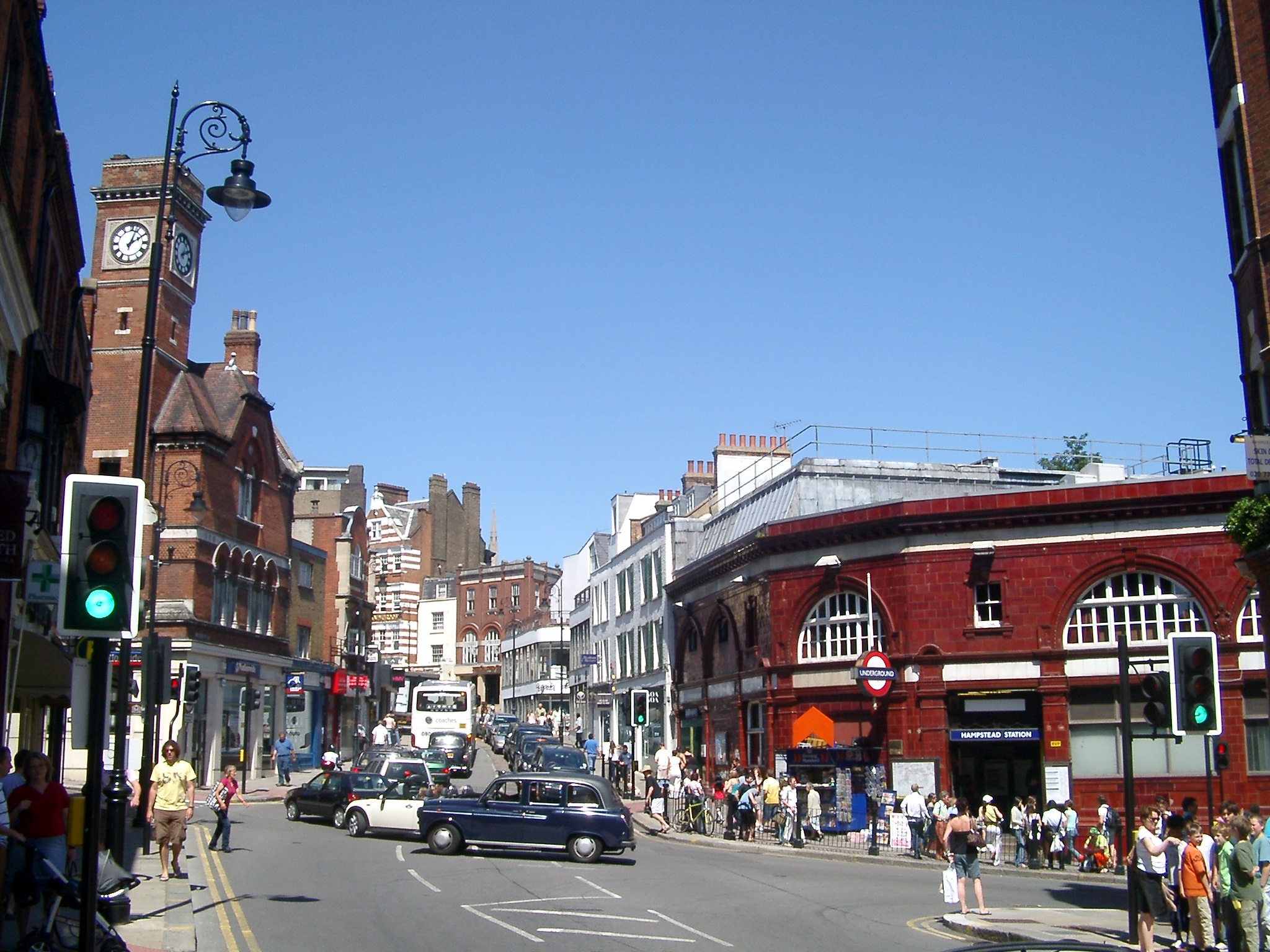
Hampstead tube station

=== Rail and Tube ===
Hampstead station is on one underground line, the Northern Line which has connections to other lines at Camden Town and Kings Cross & St Pancras stations and Embankment among others.

The London Overground (Mildmay line) also runs through Hampstead Heath and Finchley Road & Frognal.

Stations in Hampstead include:

- Belsize Park
- Finchley Road
- Finchley Road & Frognal
- Hampstead
- Hampstead Heath
- Swiss Cottage

All stations are in London fare zone 2, except Hampstead, which is in both zones 2 and 3. Hampstead station serves the north western part of the wider district, near Hampstead's traditional centre. All the other three stations in the area are located to the south.

In the 1860s, the Metropolitan and St John's Wood Railway was authorised to build a branch line from Swiss Cottage to Hampstead with its terminus to be located at the junction of Flask Walk, Well Walk and Willow Road. Financial difficulties meant that the project was cancelled in 1870.

=== Bus ===
There is a bus terminus near South End Green in Hampstead (near the Royal Free Hospital), served by London Buses routes 1 and 24. Routes 46, 268, C11, and N5 also serve the Royal Free Hospital.

Hampstead tube station and High Street are served by routes 46, 268, 603, and N5. Route 210 runs along the northernmost rim of Hampstead, stopping at Jack Straw's Castle.

Finchley Road is served by routes 13, 113, 187, 268, C11, and N113.

=== Cycling ===
Cycling infrastructure in Hampstead is poor. In early 2016, Transport for London (TfL) consulted with the public on a new "Cycle Superhighway" (CS11) between Swiss Cottage and the West End, which provide an unbroken, predominantly traffic-free cycle route from Hampstead to Central London. The scheme was cancelled following court action from the City of Westminster in 2018.

There are bus lanes along the A41/Finchley Road that cyclists are allowed to use.

A shared-use path runs from Parliament Hill to Jack Straw's Castle/Highgate through the centre of Hampstead Heath.

=== Road ===
The A41/Finchley Road passes north–south through Hampstead. The road links the area directly to Marylebone and Oxford Street to the south. The route runs northbound to Golders Green, Brent Cross, the M1 motorway, and Watford.

The A502/Hampstead High Street runs from Camden Town in the south, through Hampstead, to Golders Green and Hendon in the north-west.

== Notable residents ==
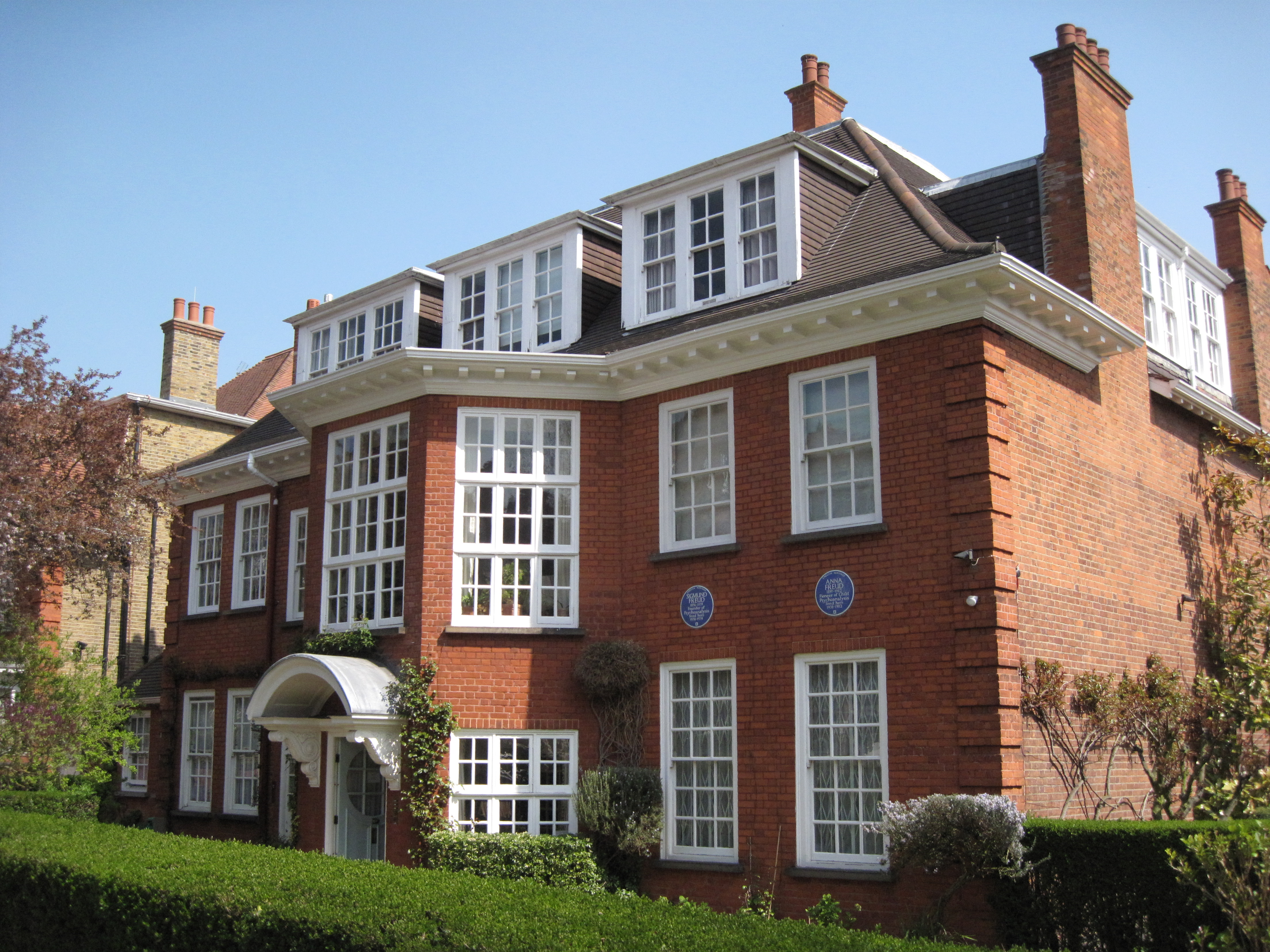
Sigmund Freud's final residence, now dedicated to his life and work as the Freud Museum, 20 Maresfield Gardens, Hampstead

Hampstead has long been known as a residence of the intelligentsia, including writers, composers, ballerinas and intellectuals, actors, artists and architects – many of whom created a bohemian community in the late 19th century. After 1917, and again in the 1930s, it became base to a community of avant garde artists and writers and was host to a number of émigrés and exiles from the Russian Revolution and Nazi Europe.

=== Blue plaques ===
There are at least 60 English Heritage blue plaques in Hampstead commemorating the many diverse personalities that have lived there.

== Local newspapers ==
The local newspapers, as of 2014, were the Hampstead and Highgate Express—known locally as the "Ham and High"—and the free Camden New Journal. The area is also home to the left-wing Labour magazine Tribune and the satirical magazine Hampstead Village Voice.

== See also ==
- The Bishops Avenue
- List of people from Hampstead
