= Jean de Bosschère =

Belgian writer and painter (1878-1953)

Jean De Bosschere
- Born: 5 July 1878; Uccle, Belgium
- Died: 17 January 1953 (aged 74); Châteauroux, France
- Occupations: Painter, writer

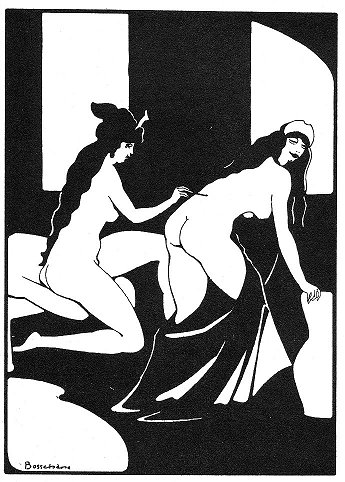
Ovid

Jean de Bosschère (Uccle, 5 July 1878 – Châteauroux, 17 January 1953) was a Belgian writer and painter.

After a tormented childhood, Jean studied at the Royal Academy of Fine Arts from 1896 to 1900. In 1909, he published his first collection of poetry, Béâle-Gryne, which he illustrated himself. The style of these illustrations, as well as his later work, was influenced by the drawings of Aubrey Beardsley and the spiritual works of French poet and dramatist Paul Claudel. De Bosschère was accused of Satanism in 1912, in response to his first novel, Dolorine et les Ombres (1911). In 1914, he made a trip to Italy. In 1915, after the outbreak of World War I, he fled from Belgium and went to London where he met writers such as Aldous Huxley and D. H. Lawrence, Ezra Pound, and T. S. Eliot. De Bosschère illustrated numerous books in the '20s and '30s, including the poems of Oscar Wilde and Charles Baudelaire and erotic classics by Aristophanes, Ovid, and Apuleius. At the end of 1922, he left London and lived in Albano near Rome, followed by Brussels, Paris, and Solaia near Siena in Italy, where De Bosschère worked on his many novels and poetry collections. De Bosschère settled in La Châtre in central France in 1938.

De Bosschère's work was marked by a persistent search for spirituality and a fascination with the occult and the sexual. He wrote several novels, including two autobiographies, and two anthologies of most of his poetry, however, much of his work remains unpublished. In 1952, he was awarded the Prix de la Méditerranée (Mediterranean Prize) and the Mandat des Poètes.

== Early life ==
Bosschère was born in Uccle, the son of Charles de Bosschere and Nancy Marie Hélène Van der Stock. In 1884, the family moved to Lier, where Jean spent a tormented childhood full of affection for his disfigured sister Marthe, described in Marthe et l'Enragé. In 1893, Jean attended the École d'Horticulture in Ghent. In 1894, the family moved to Antwerp, where Jean attended the Royal Academy of Fine Arts from 1896 to 1900.

== Influences ==
Between 1901 and 1905, he regularly visited Paris where he met writers with a passion for the occult. On 25 March 1905, he married Jeanne Fanny Alexandra Jones; they separated officially in 1923. From 1905 to 1914, he wrote regular articles for the magazine L'Occident and L'Art Flamand et Hollandais. From 1907, he also wrote several monographs, especially on Flemish art. Two years later he published his first collection of poetry, Béâle-Gryne, which he illustrated himself. The style of these illustrations, as well as his later work, was a version of Art Nouveau heavily influenced by the drawings of Aubrey Beardsley. He was also influenced by the Roman Catholic spiritual works of French poet and dramatist Paul Claudel, whom he saw lecture in 1909. That same year, he began a lifelong friendship with the Antwerp Symbolist poet Max Elskamp (of whom in 1914, he published a critical study), and in 1911, of the French writer Andre Suares. Around 1912, he underwent a moral and emotional crisis and distanced himself from Symbolism. He was accused of Satanism in 1912, in response to his first novel, Dolorine et les Ombres (1911). In 1914, he made a trip to Italy.

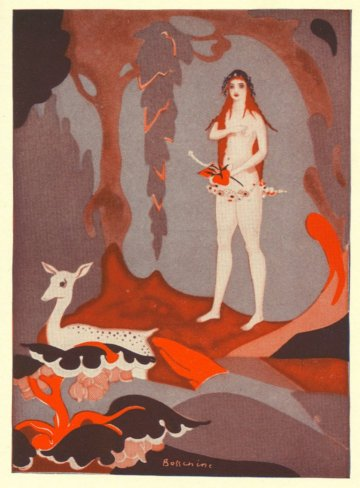
Illustration by Jean de Bosschere in Ovid's Ars Amatoria

== Life in exile ==
In 1915, after the outbreak of World War I, he fled from Belgium and went to London where he met writers such as John Gould Fletcher, Aldous Huxley and D. H. Lawrence, and Imagist poets such as Ezra Pound, T. S. Eliot and Richard Aldington. He met several London publishers for whom he illustrated numerous books in the '20s and '30s. Among the books he illustrated were the poems of Oscar Wilde and Charles Baudelaire. He also illustrated erotic classics by Aristophanes, Ovid, Strato and Apuleius. In 1920, he moved in with his beloved Vera Anne Hamilton but she died in January 1922. At the end of 1922, he left London with Élisabeth d'Ennetières, with whom he would stay for the rest of his life. They settled in Albano, near Rome. In the winter of 1925–26, they lived in Brussels, then from March 1926, in Paris, where he met Antonin Artaud. They also stayed regularly Solaia near Siena in Italy, where De Bosschere worked on his many novels and poetry collections.

== Mysticism and decline ==
The work of De Bosschere was marked by a persistent spiritual seeking in his life he developed a fascination with the occult, the spiritual, the obscure and the sexual. He gave himself the nickname "Satan" and "l'Obscure", which formed the title of Satan l'Obscure (1933), his second autobiographical novel after Marthe et l'Enragé.

The decade of the '30s was difficult for De Bosschere. He wrote several novels that he regarded as failures and found little illustration work due to the poor economic climate. From 1938 he lived a secluded life in La Châtre in central France. He kept a diary from 1946 titled Journal d'un Rebelle Solitaire that has remained unreleased. He also made two anthologies of most of his poetry: Derniers poèmes de l'Obscure (1948) and Héritiers de l'abime (1950).

== Awards and death ==
In September 1952 he received the Prix de la Méditerranée and in November the Mandat des Poètes. A year later he died at the age of 74 in the hospital in Châteauroux. Following his death several of his works were published, but much of the work, which is kept in the Archives et Musée de la littérature in Brussels, of this prolific writer has remained unpublished.

Weird Islands, work by Jean de Bosschère, 1921, Contemporary Printed Books Departement (KBR)

== Selected bibliography ==
=== Works in English ===
- The Closed Door, trans. F. S. Flint. John Lane: New York, 1917.
- Folk Tales of Flanders (also pub. as Beasts and Men). London: William Heinemann, 1918.
- The City Curious. London: William Heinemann, 1920.
- Weird Islands. London: William Heinemann, 1921.
- The Love Books of Ovid. London: John Lane The Bodley Head, 1925 – 24 plates.
- Marthe and the Madman, trans. Pierre Loving. New York: Covici-Friede, 1928.
- Peacocks and Other Mysteries, trans. Frederick Street Hoppin. New York: Edmond Byrne Hackett, 1941.
- The House of Forsaken Hope, trans. Donald MacAndrew (from Satan, l'Obscure). London: Fortune Press, 1942.
