= Well Road =

Street in London, England

Coordinates: 51°33′31.3″N 0°10′32.2″W

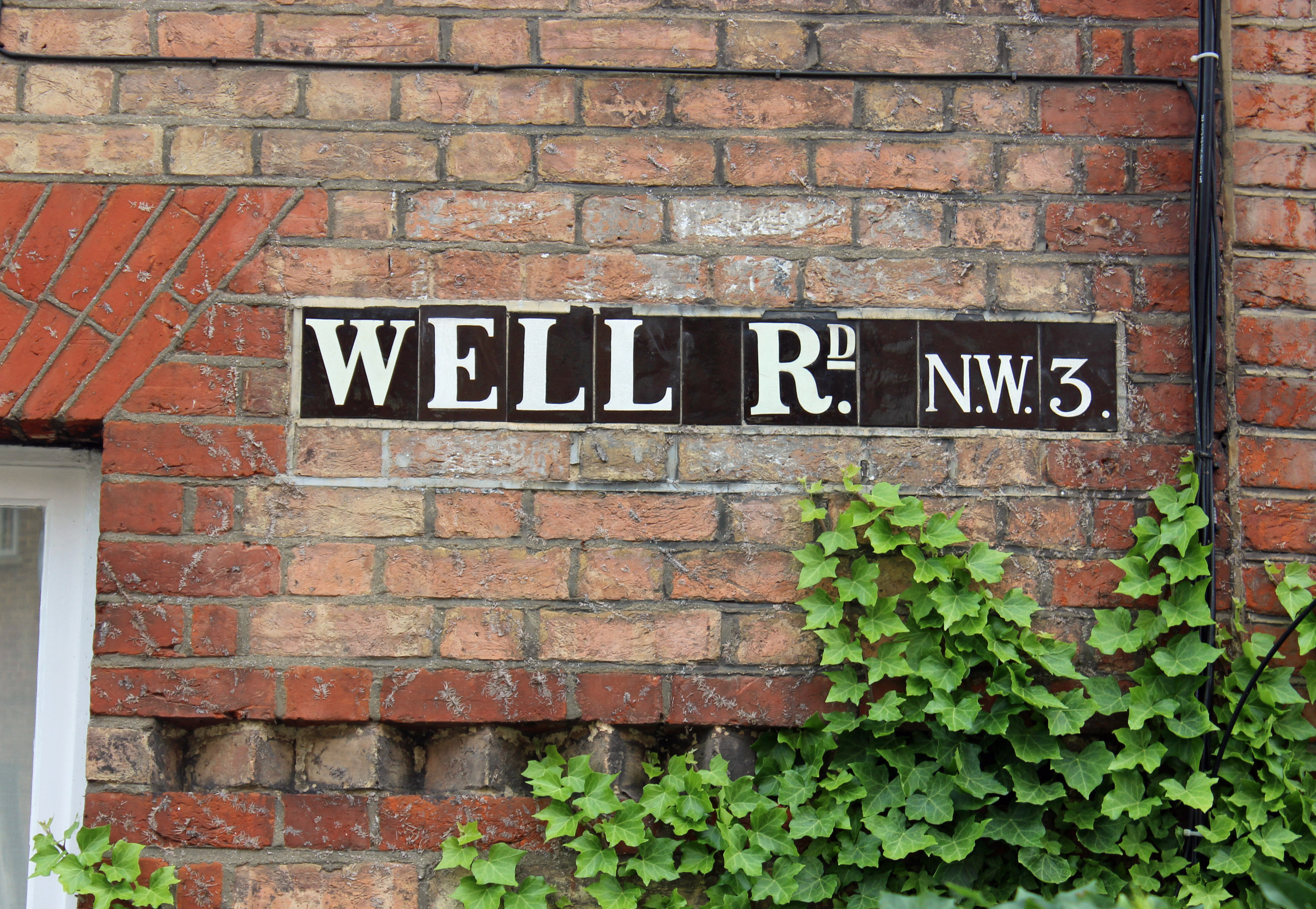
Historic street sign.

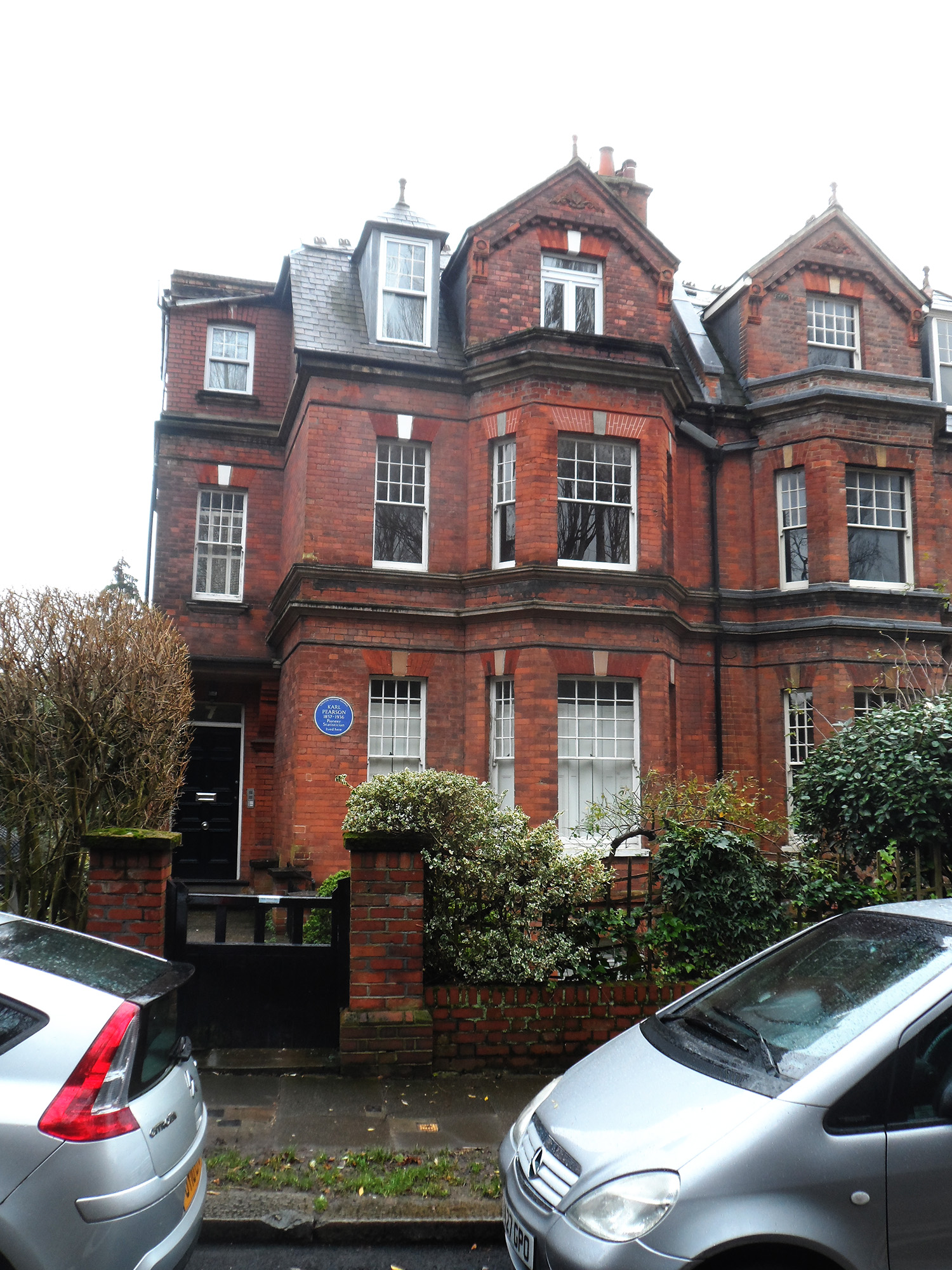
Blue plaque on the former home of mathematician Karl Pearson.

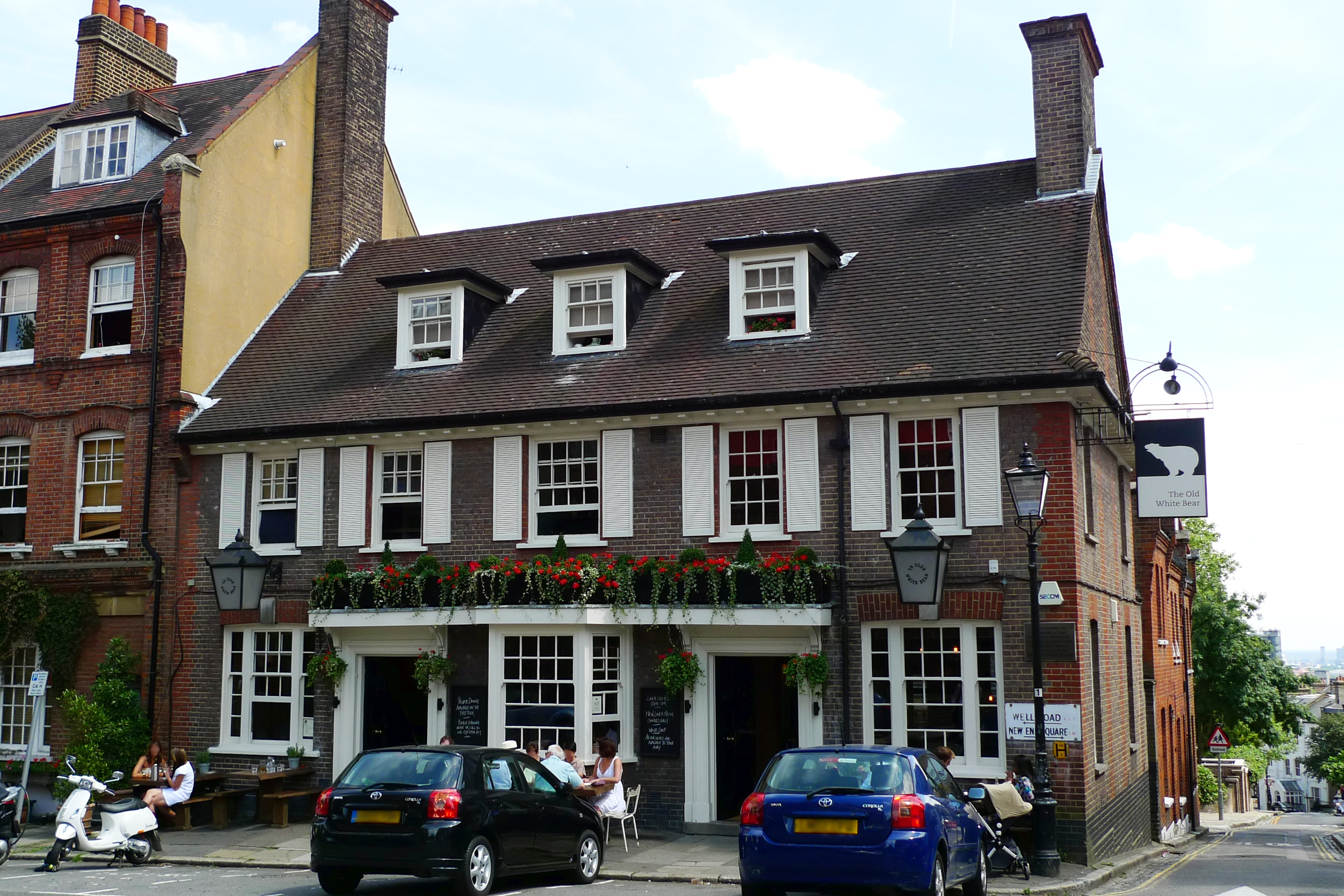
The Old White Bear pub.

Well Road is a street in Hampstead, England in the London Borough of Camden. It runs westwards from Hampstead Heath to New End Square. Well Walk runs parallel to its south and the two are linked by Wells Passage. When the Hampstead Wells were in existence, a large pump room and assembly room were located on Well Walk, with the water supplied from the headspring on Well Road.

A blue plaque commemorates the house of the mathematician Karl Pearson. Other former residents include the Egyptologist Flinders Petrie and the writer Richard Hughes. Two detached cottages Providence Corner and Cannon Cottage dating from the early eighteenth century are now Grade II listed. Cannon Cottage was once home to the writer Daphne Du Maurier and features a plaque put up by the Hampstead Society.

The Logs is a large mansion dating back to the 1860s. At the eastern end of the road, on the corner with East Heath Road, is Foley House which was built in 1698 for the first manager of the Hampstead Wells. It is also now Grade II listed. At the western end of the road is the pub The Old White Bear, dating back to 1704. The street also contains the studio of artist Mark Gertler who worked there in the 1930s and is also commemorated with a plaque.

== Bibliography ==
- Bebbington, Gillian. London Street Names. Batsford, 1972.
- Cherry, Bridget & Pevsner, Nikolaus. London 4: North. Yale University Press, 2002.
- Wade, Christopher. The Streets of Hampstead. Camden History Society, 2000.
