= Wells Tavern, Hampstead =

Pub in Hampstead, London

Coordinates: 51°33′31″N 0°10′25″W

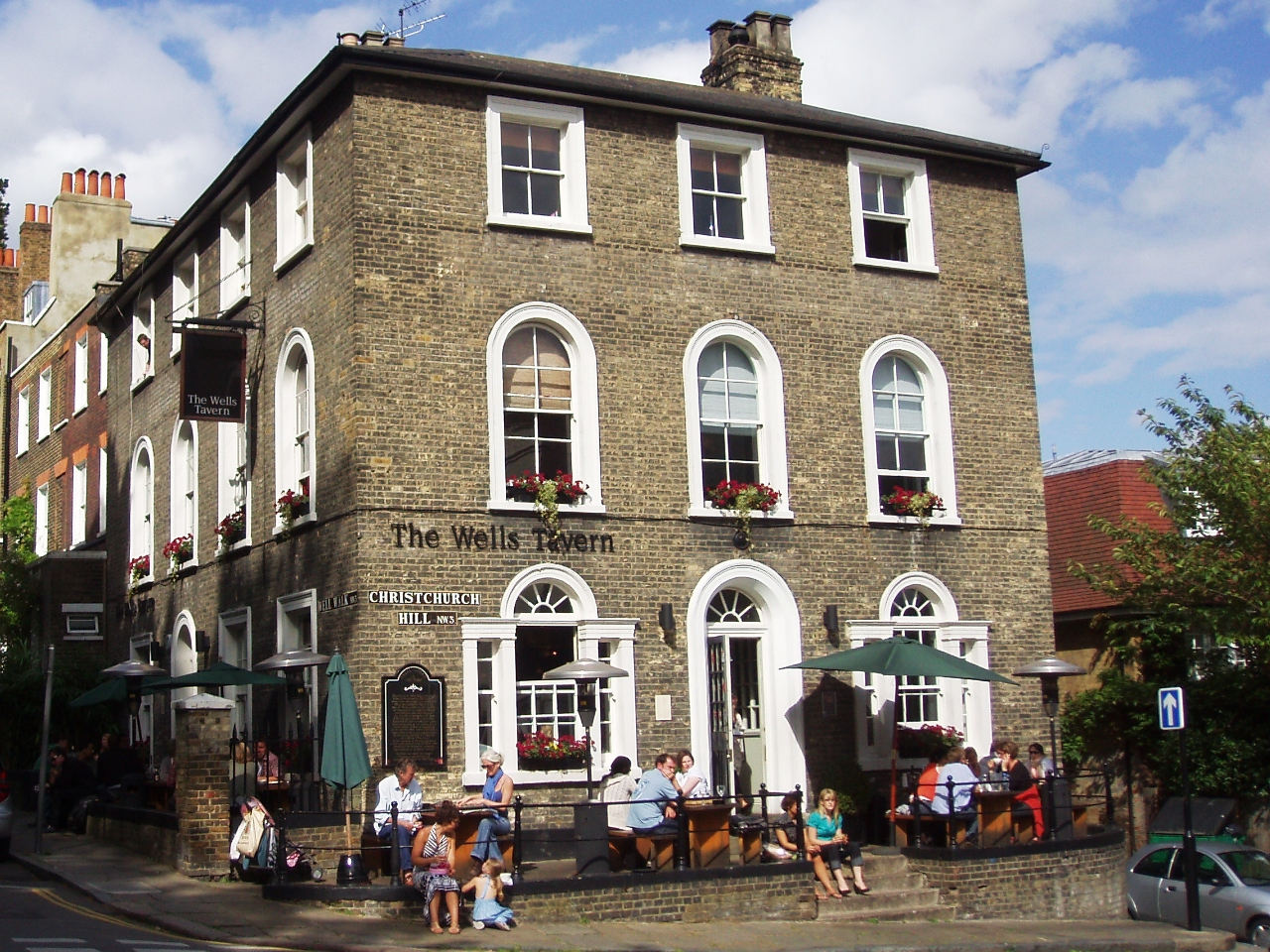
The Wells Tavern

The Wells Tavern is a Grade II listed public house at 30 Well Walk, Hampstead, London.

It was built in about 1849.
