= Well Walk =

Street in London, England

Coordinates: 51.559°N 0.173°W

Well Walk is a street in Hampstead, England in the London Borough of Camden. It runs southwestwards from Hampstead Heath to Flask Walk which then continues on towards the centre of Hampstead Village around the Hampstead tube station. It takes its name from the historic Hampstead Wells.

Established in 1698 as a public wells, the area rapidly grew in popularity and a pump room was built along with an assembly room. Usage at the wells declined in the nineteenth century and the building was demolished, but is commemorated by a memorial fountain opposite it erected in 1882. Wells Passage is a footpath that follows uphill from the fountain to the headspring in what is now Well Road. The Wells Tavern was established in 1850, replacing an older public house known as The Green Man. Burgh House is located just off the western end of the street in New End Square. Gainsborough Gardens runs southwards from the street.

Many of the buildings in the street are now Grade II listed generally dating from the early and late nineteenth century with some dating from the eighteenth. Notable former residents included the artist John Constable, who lived at 40 Well Walk from 1827 until his death in 1837 and whose house is now Grade II* listed, architect Temple Moore and early Socialist politician Henry Hyndman. Constable and Hyndman's houses are commemorated with blue plaques.

Nos. 21-27, formerly called Foley Avenue, are an eclectic pair of semi-detached houses designed by Henry Simpson Legg, architect and surveyor for the Hampstead Wells Trust. The houses were a speculative development by Edward Gotto, who lived in The Logs, Well Road.

In 1774 Roman pottery was discovered in the street, suggesting that a Roman road may have run through Hampstead.

== Gallery ==
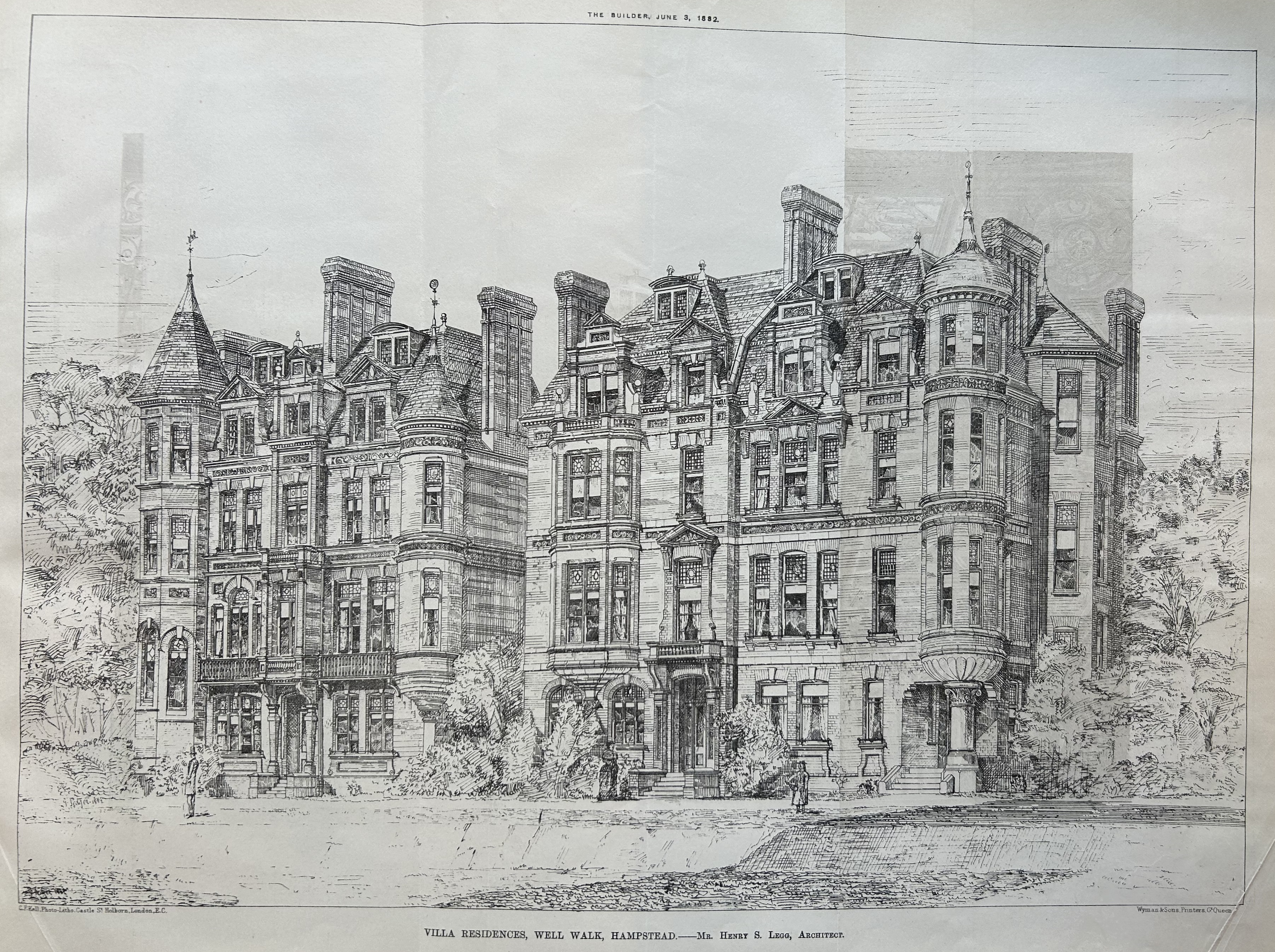
21-27 Well Walk, Hampstead

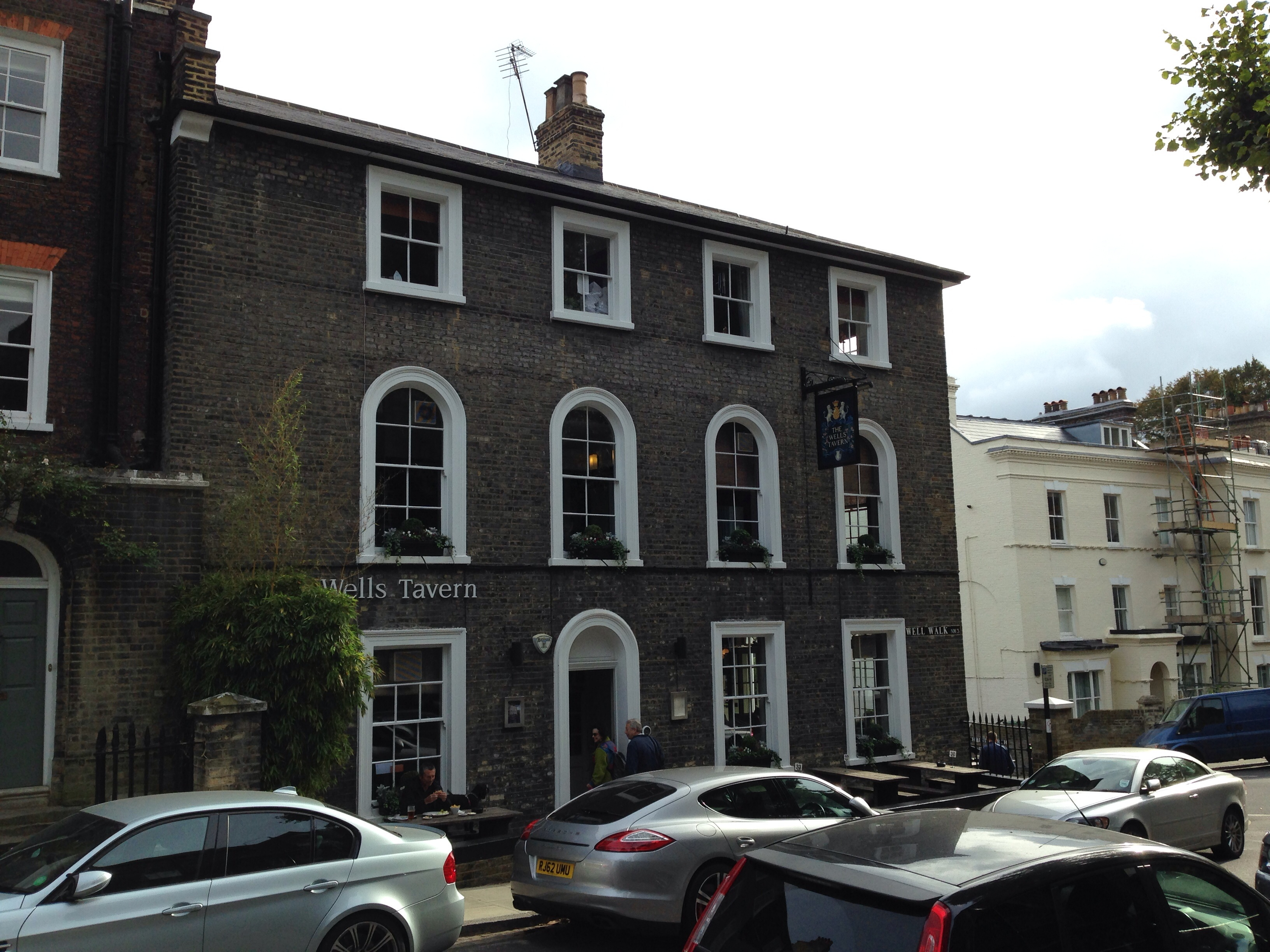
Wells Tavern seen from Well Walk.

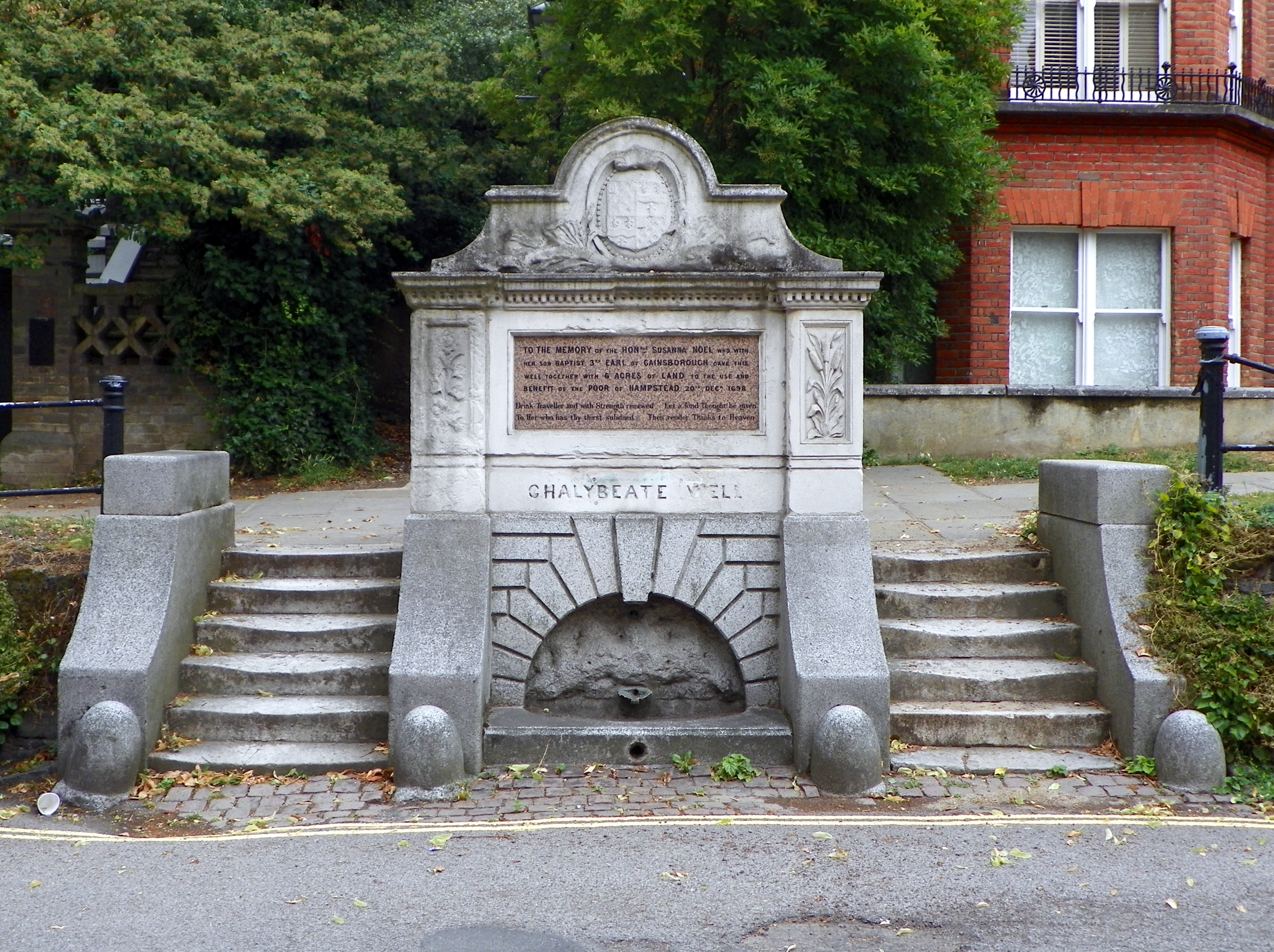
1892 monument commemorating the historic Hampstead Wells.

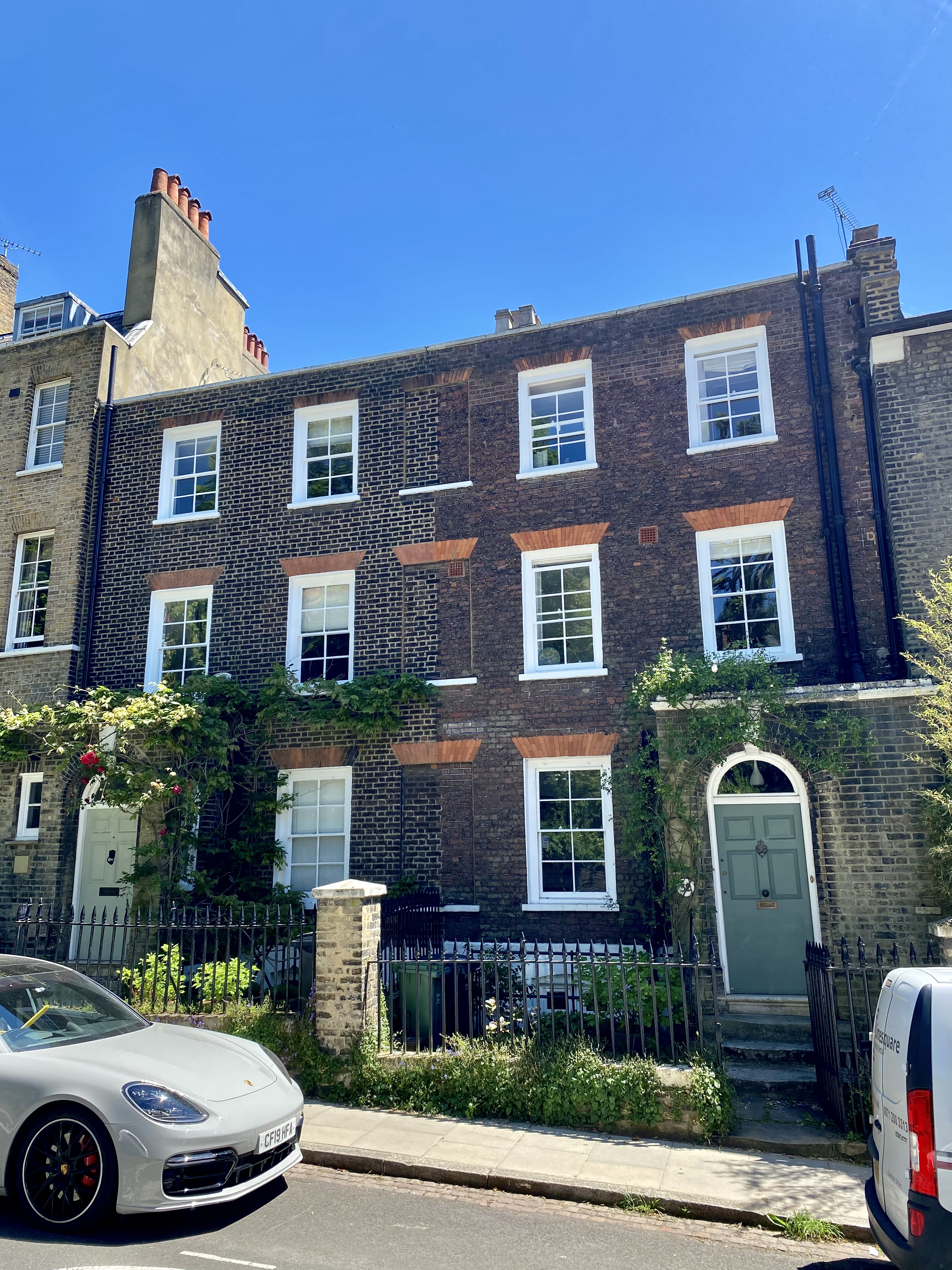
Georgian era houses in the street.

== Bibliography ==
- Bebbington, Gillian. London Street Names. Batsford, 1972.
- Cherry, Bridget & Pevsner, Nikolaus. London 4: North. Yale University Press, 2002.
- Wade, Christopher. The Streets of Hampstead. Camden History Society, 2000.
