= Gainsborough Gardens =

Road in Hampstead, London

Coordinates: 51°33′32″N 0°10′20″W

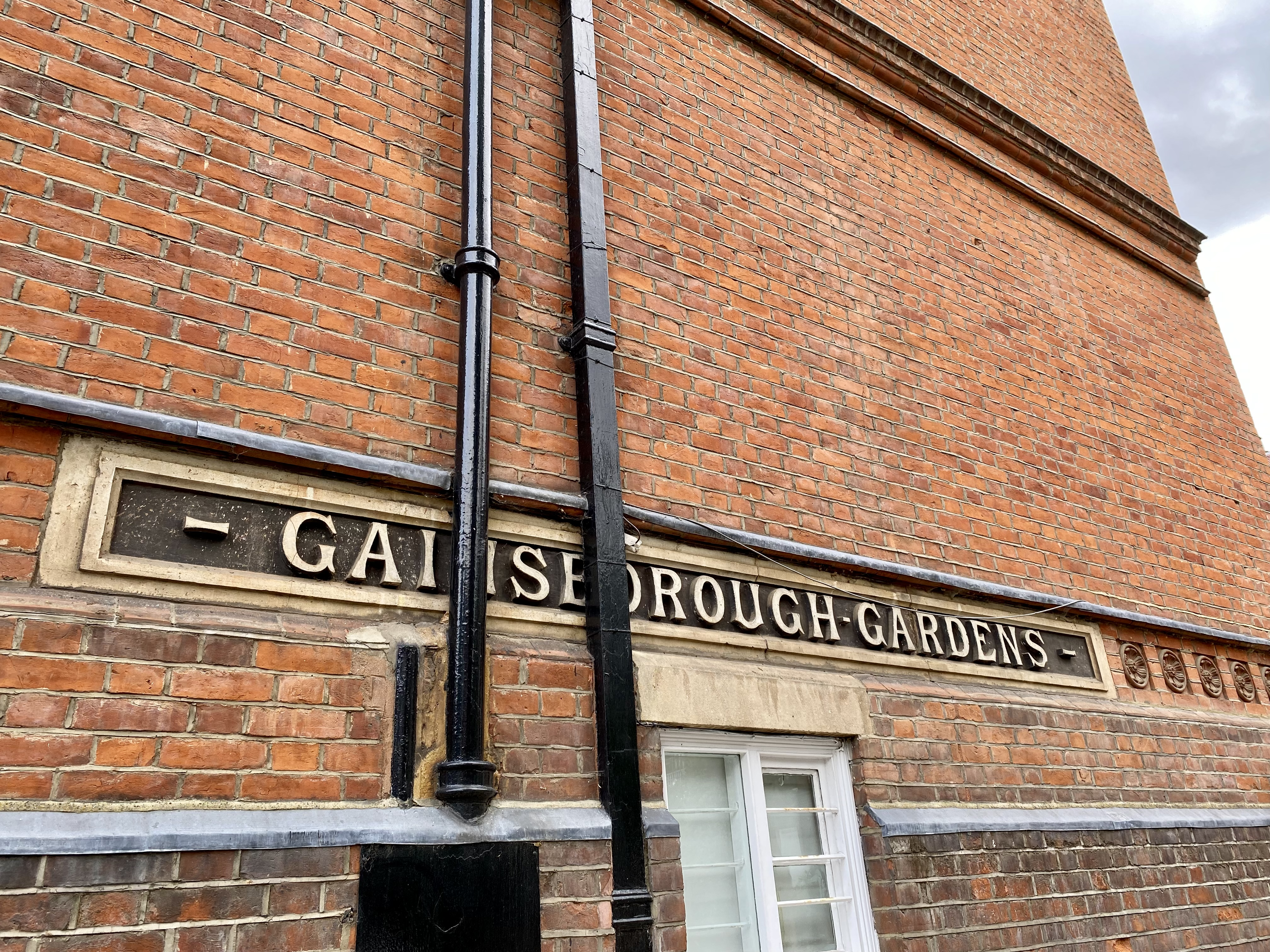
The sign at the Well Walk entrance to Gainsborough Gardens

Gainsborough Gardens is a private road in Hampstead, in the London Borough of Camden. The road is arranged in an oval crescent around a central garden. It was laid out towards the end of the nineteenth century and influenced by the Bedford Park development in south west London. Many of its houses are grade II listed with Historic England. Notable former residents include the songwriter Gary Osborne, the historian Bernard M. Allen, and author John le Carré.

== History ==
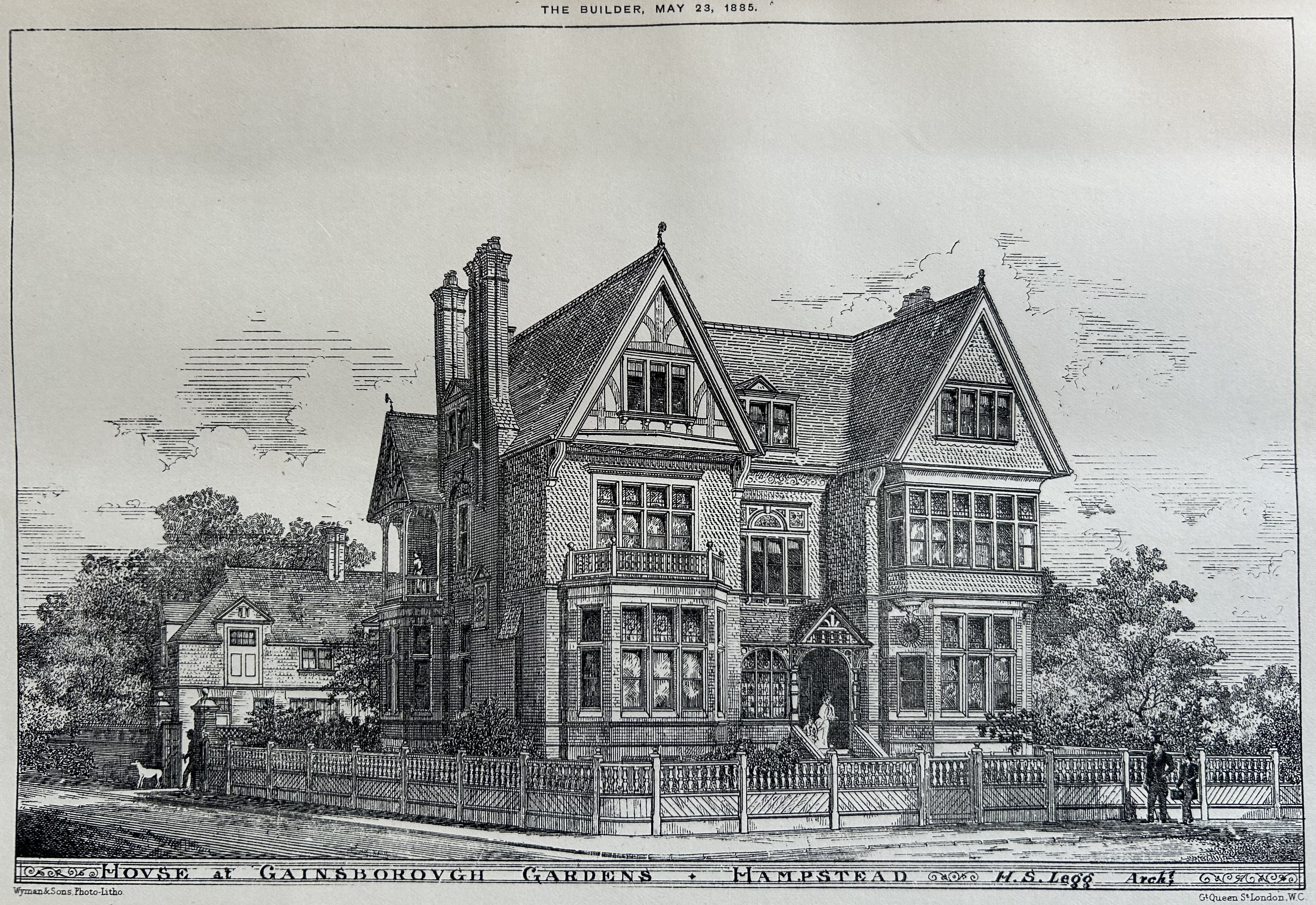
No. 6 illustrated in The Builder in 1885

It was laid out on land that belonged to the Wells and Campden Charity Trust overseen by Henry Simpson Legg, architect and surveyor of the Trust between 1882 and 1895. The creation and aesthetics of Gainsborough Gardens was influenced by the Bedford Park development in Chiswick, in south west London.

In 1934 The Times stated that the residents of Gainsborough Gardens "...enjoy privacy and quietude as there are gates and lodges, and few, except an occasional visitor out of curiosity, enter the gardens unless to call at one of the houses". It is protected under the London Squares Preservation Act 1931.

In 1888 the annual rental income of a house on Gainsborough Gardens was estimated to be £300 (equivalent to £33,713 in 2025). A 2 bedroom garden flat on Gainsborough Gardens was available to rent for £125 a week in 1981 (equivalent to £482 in 2025). A detached 5 bedroom house on Gainsborough Gardens was offered for sale for £1 million in 1990 (equivalent to £2,472,894 in 2025). The average price of a house in Gainsborough Gardens was £7 million in 2019.

== Garden ==
The communal garden at the centre of the development is 0.4137 hectares (1.022 acres) in size and was the site of a bowling green and ornamental pond in former pleasure gardens. The garden has been opened to the public on 17 occasions as part of the Open Garden Squares Weekend organised by the London Parks & Gardens Trust.

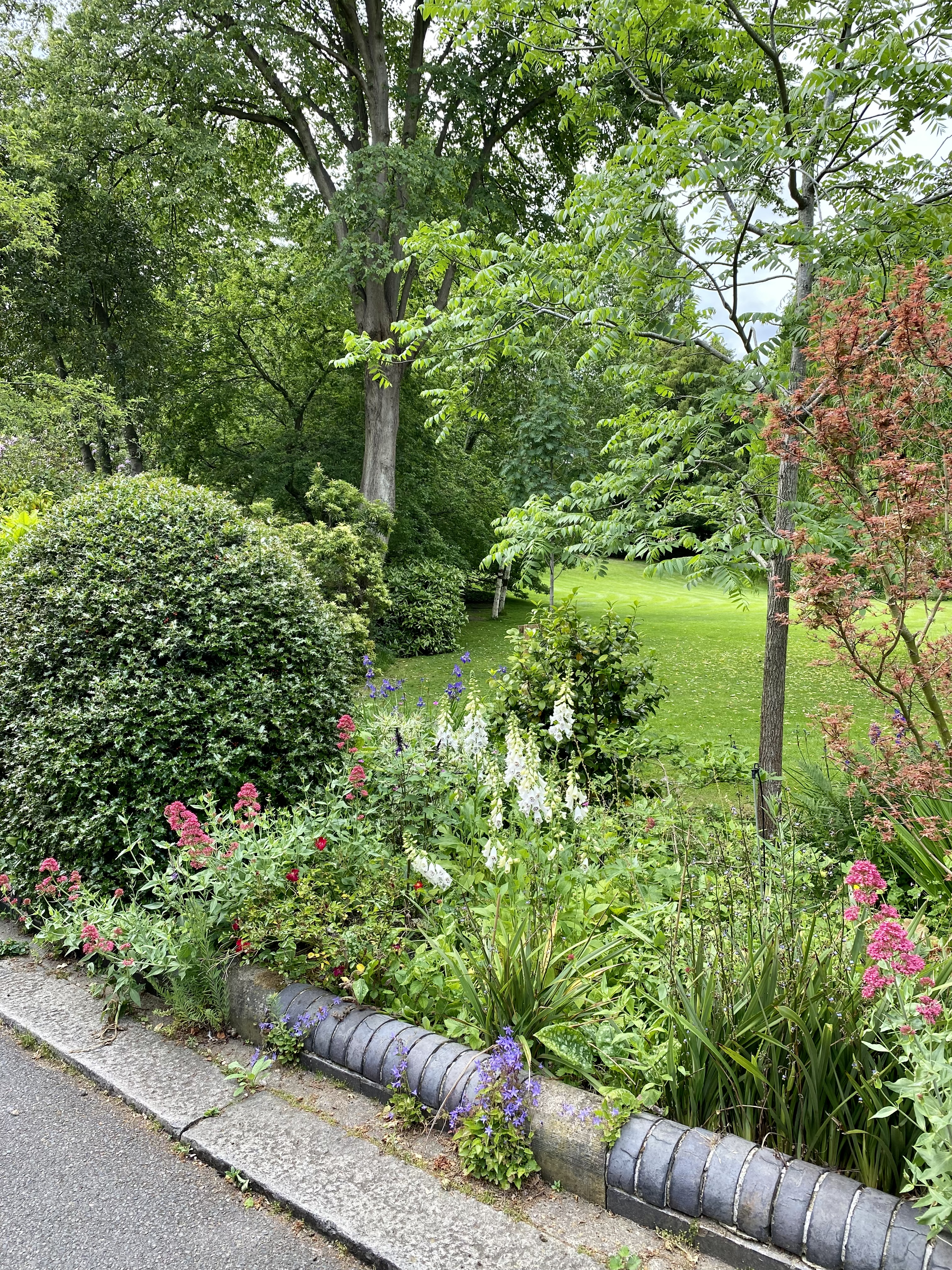

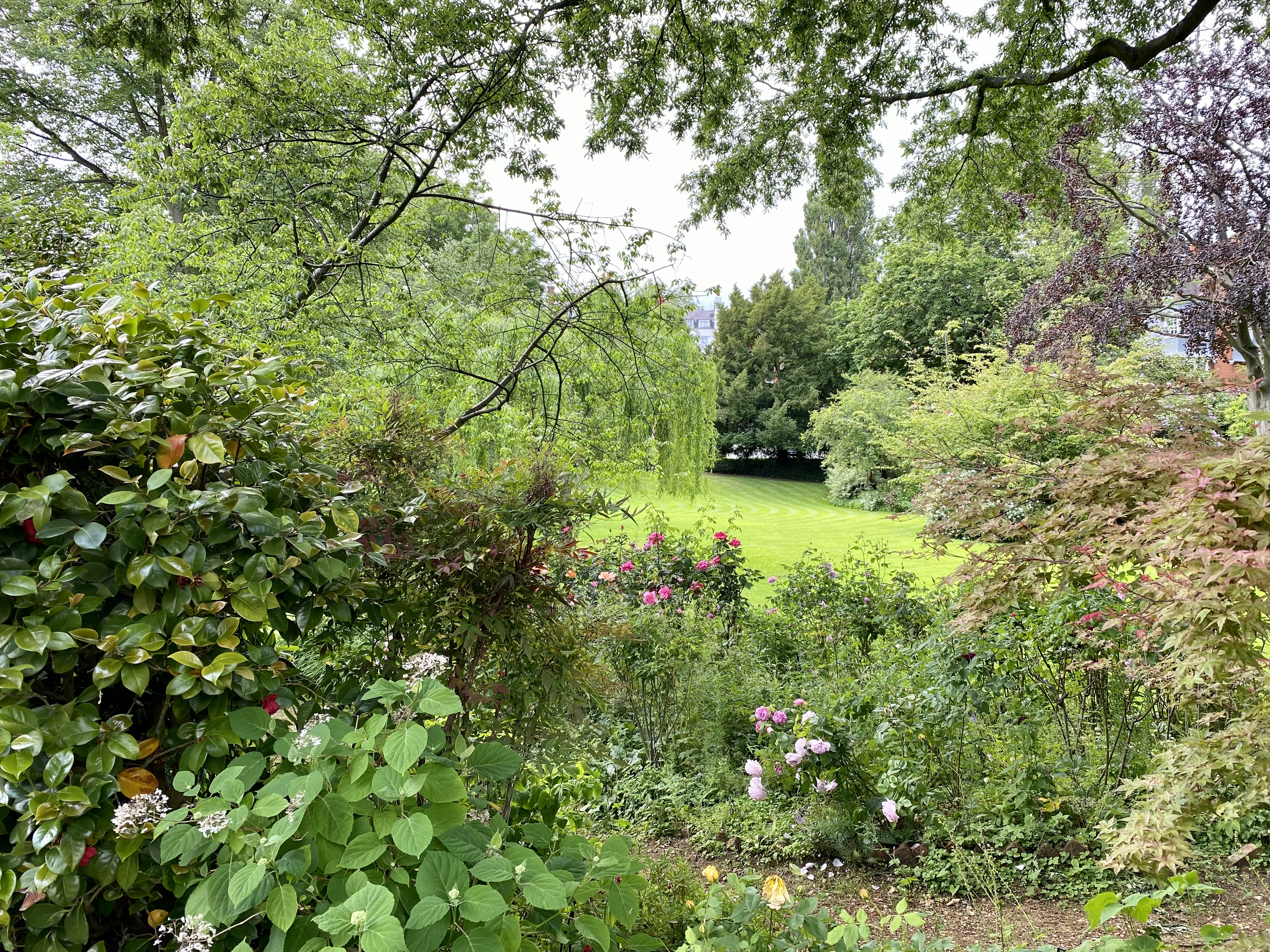
The communal garden in June 2021

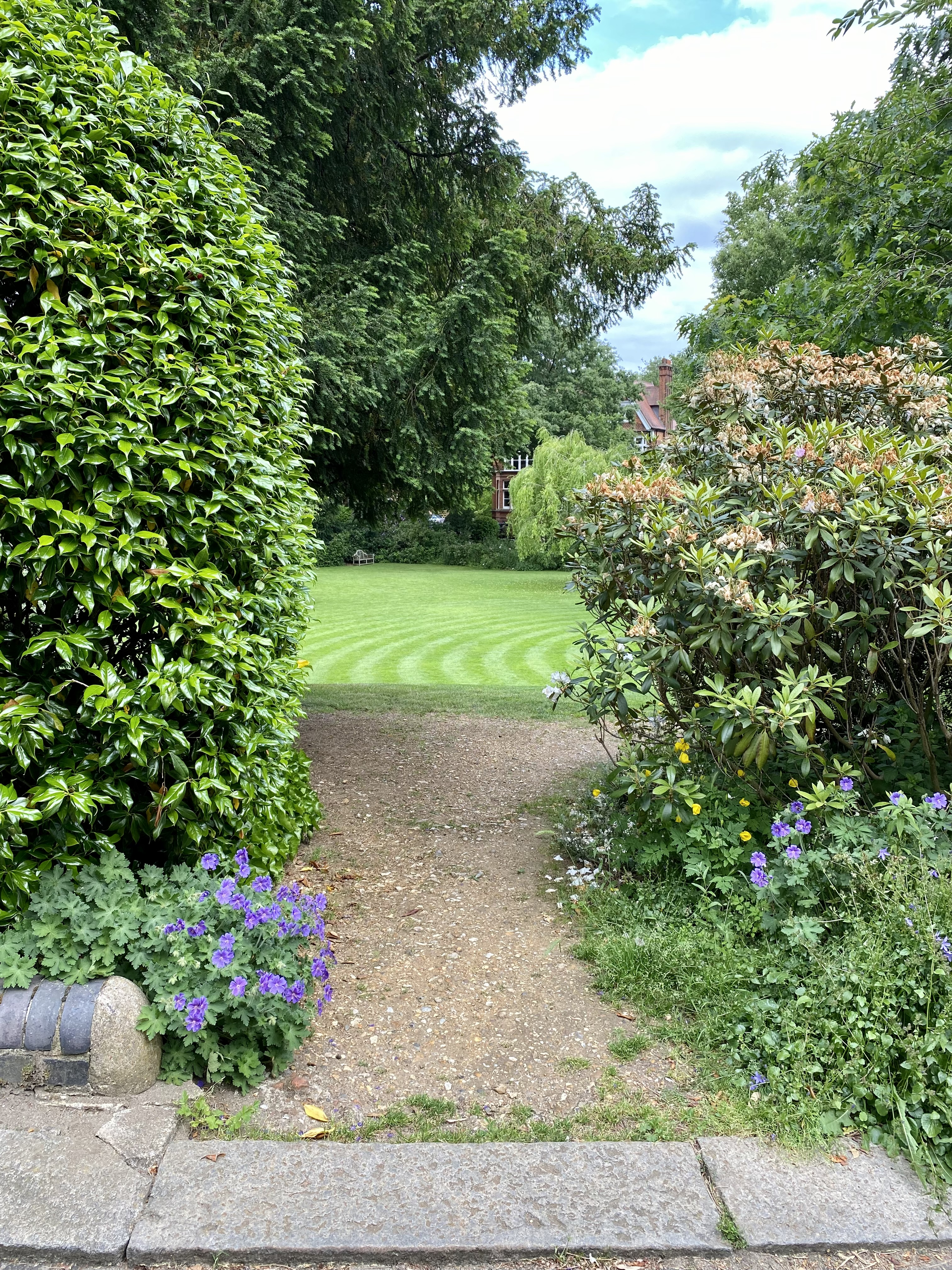

== Architecture ==
Nos. 7, 8, 9 & 10 were designed by Legg. Nos. 5, 6, 9a and 14 are individually listed Grade II on the National Heritage List for England (NHLE). Nos. 3 and 4, 7 and 8, 9 and 10, and 11, 12, and 13 are listed in their respective groups.

Nos. 11, 12, 13 were designed and developed in 1893 by the influential Queen Anne revival architect Horace Field as a speculation, in part funded by his stepmother, Alicia Field, for whom he also designed "The Small House", No.14.

9a, known as 'Eirene Cottage' was designed by Elijah Hoole for C.E. Maurice and his wife and was completed in 1891. The National Heritage List for England praises its "high-quality design in the Vernacular Revival mode". Maurice was married to the sister of Octavia Hill, the founder of the National Trust. Hoole's designs for Hill are remiscent of his design for 9a including his model cottages in Ranston Street in Marylebone and in Redcross and Whitecross Gardens in Southwark. 9a is noted for its distinctive sgraffito frieze of roundels in a cinquefoil design, above this, its name of 'Eirene Cottage' is inscribed.

The former stables to No. 6, now known as the Cottage on the Heath and Grade II listed, was designed by Legg and built in 1885. The NHLE listing describes the cottage as occupying "a prominent, bastion-like position in Gainsborough Gardens".

The lodge building to Gainsborough Gardens at its Well Walk entrance was built in 1886, and also designed by Legg, for the gardener of the crescent. It is listed Grade II.

The semi-detached pair of No. 3 and 4 was the first completed building in Gainsborough Gardens, they were completed in 1884 and designed by E.J. May. No. 4 featured in the 1970 film The Railway Children as the location of the family home before the children's move to Yorkshire.

== Notable residents ==
9a, 'Eirene Cottage', was the home of C.E. Maurice, the husband of the sister of Octavia Hill. Hill was the founder of the National Trust and a pioneer of conservation. Maurice helped preserve Parliament Hill Fields and limit the expansion of construction onto nearby Hampstead Heath while living at 9a. The family of songwriter Gary Osborne lived in Gainsborough Gardens in the late 1960s. The women's suffrage campaigner Elizabeth Knight lived at No. 7 in 1933. The historian Bernard M. Allen moved to "The Small House", No. 14, in Gainsborough Gardens in 1904. The Labour MP Arthur Greenwood lived at No. 8 in the 1950s. The former Governor of Northern Nigeria, George Sinclair Browne, died at his residence in Gainsborough Gardens in 1946. Archibald Chisholm, the oil executive and former editor of the Financial Times, lived at No. 4 in the 1940s. The author John le Carré lived at No. 9 from January 1980 until his death alongside his homes in Tregiffian in Cornwall and Wengen in Switzerland. No. 10: Lieutenant Colonel Robert Shore, Irish Surgeon, M.D., R.U.I., L.F.P.S.G., Indian Medical Service, recipient of the Kaiser-i-Hind Gold Medal in 1906, retired to London and lived at No. 10 Gainsborough Gardens, with his wife Gertrude, circa 1925 & lived there until his death in 1944.

== Gallery ==
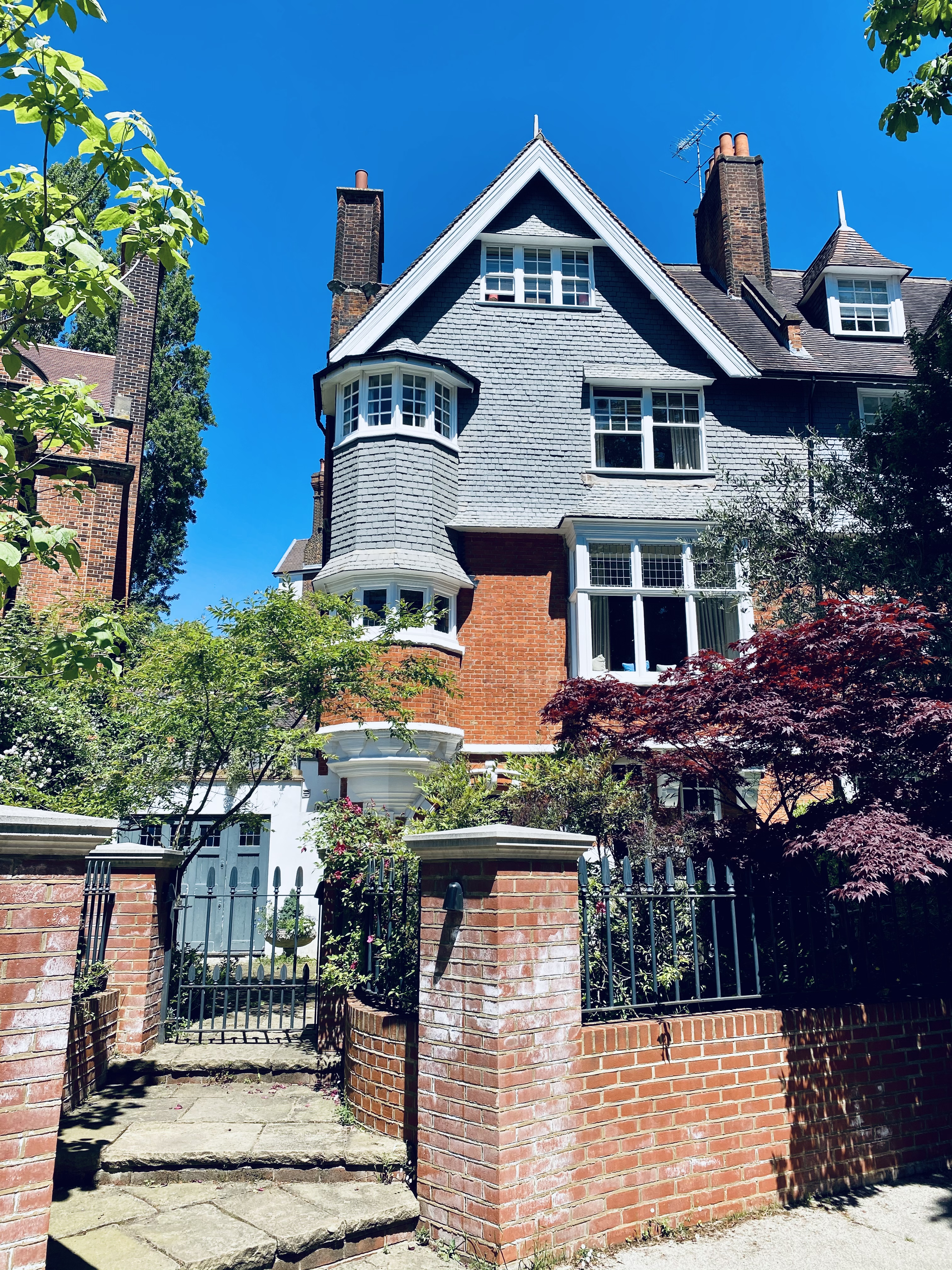
No. 3

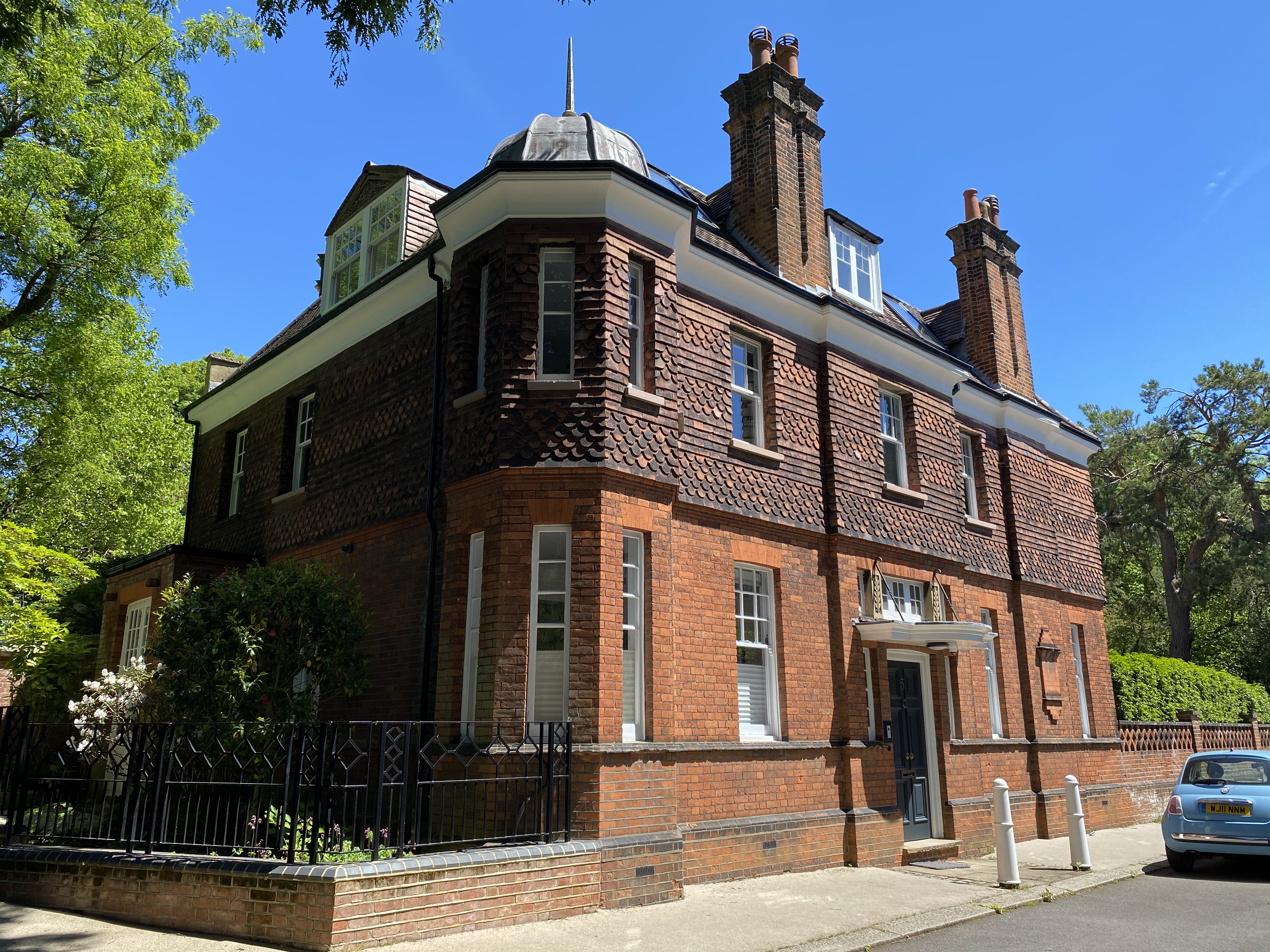
No. 5

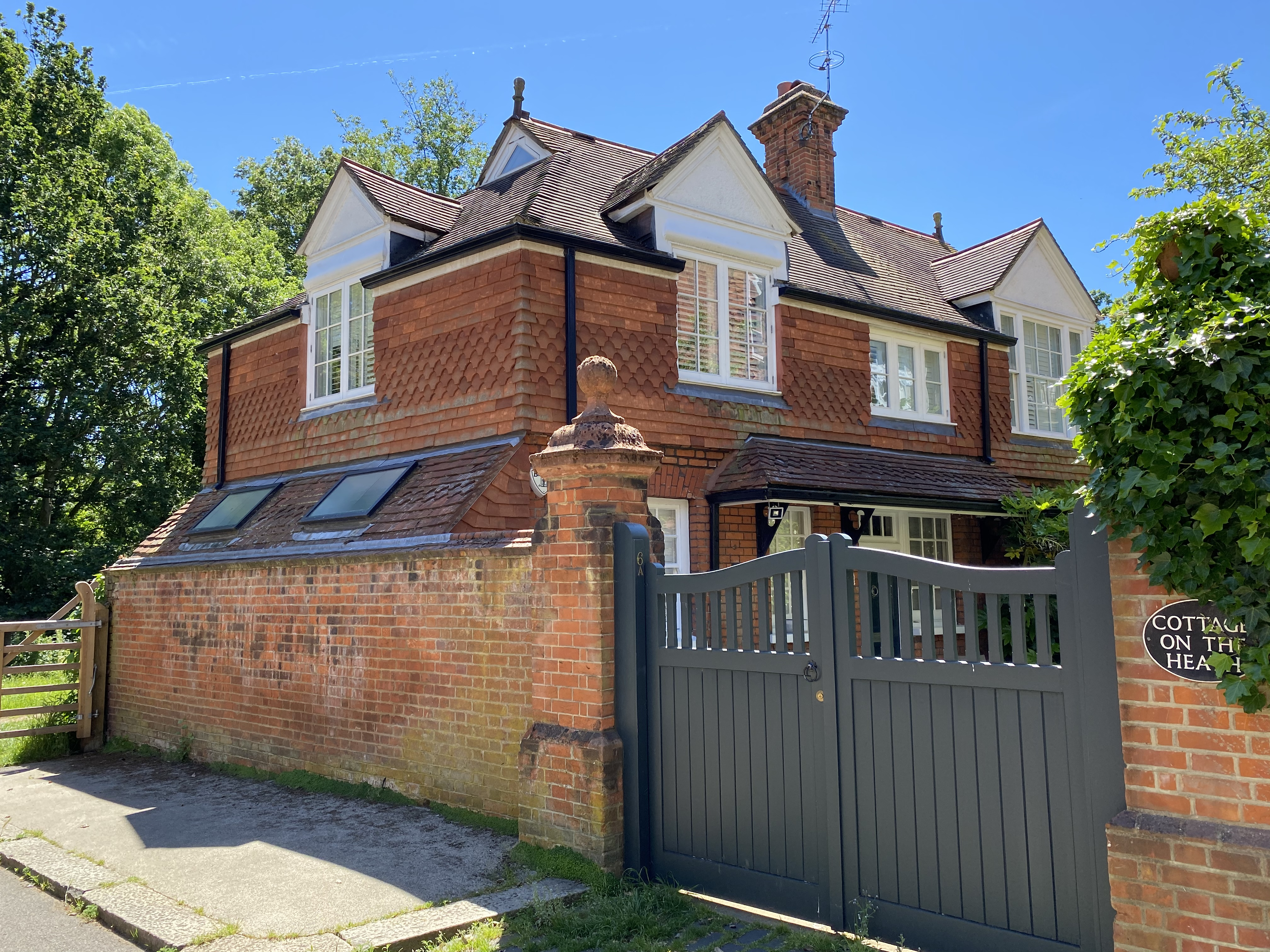
The 'Cottage on the Heath' at the Heathside entrance to Gainsborough Gardens

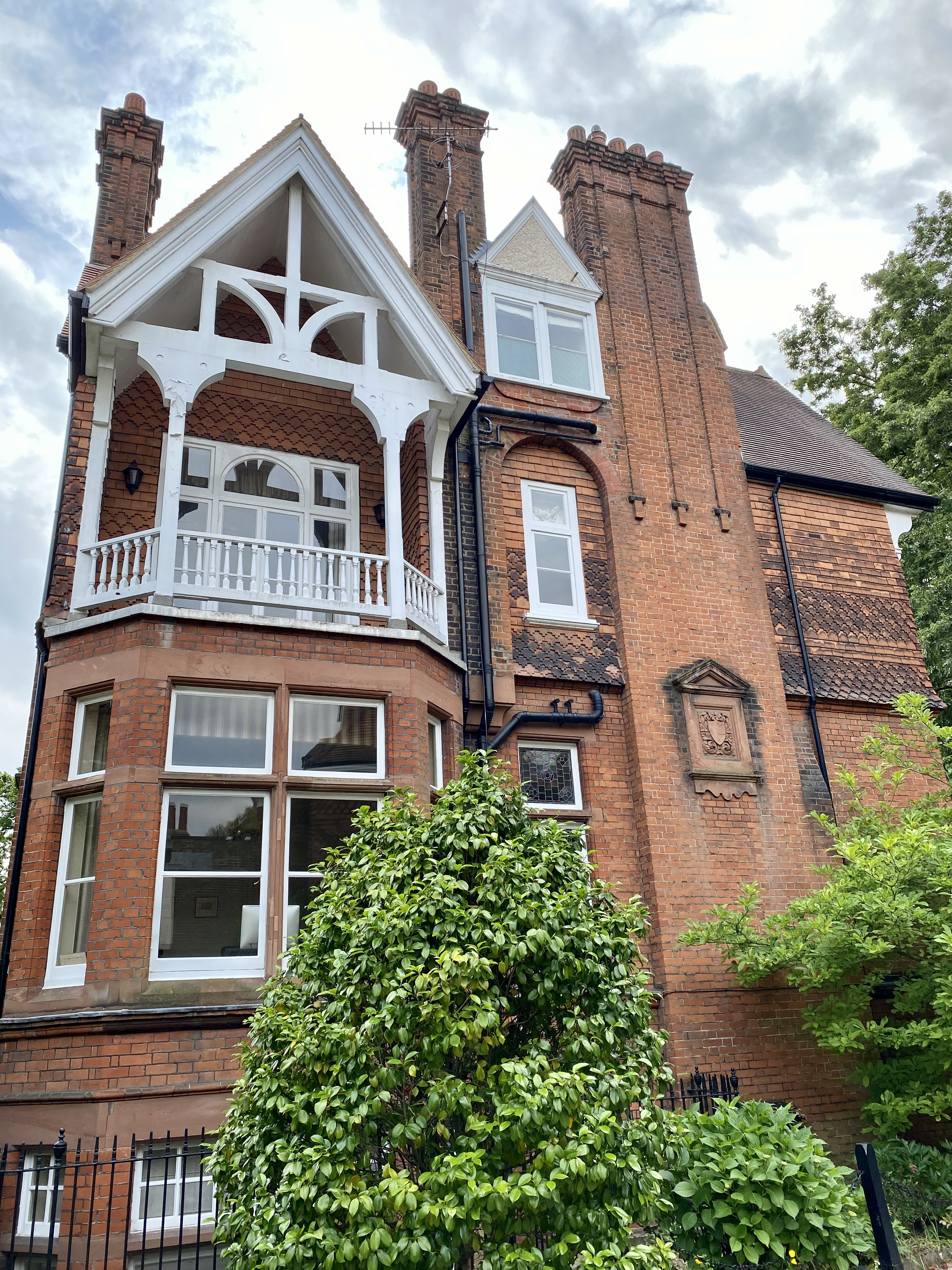
The side profile of No. 6

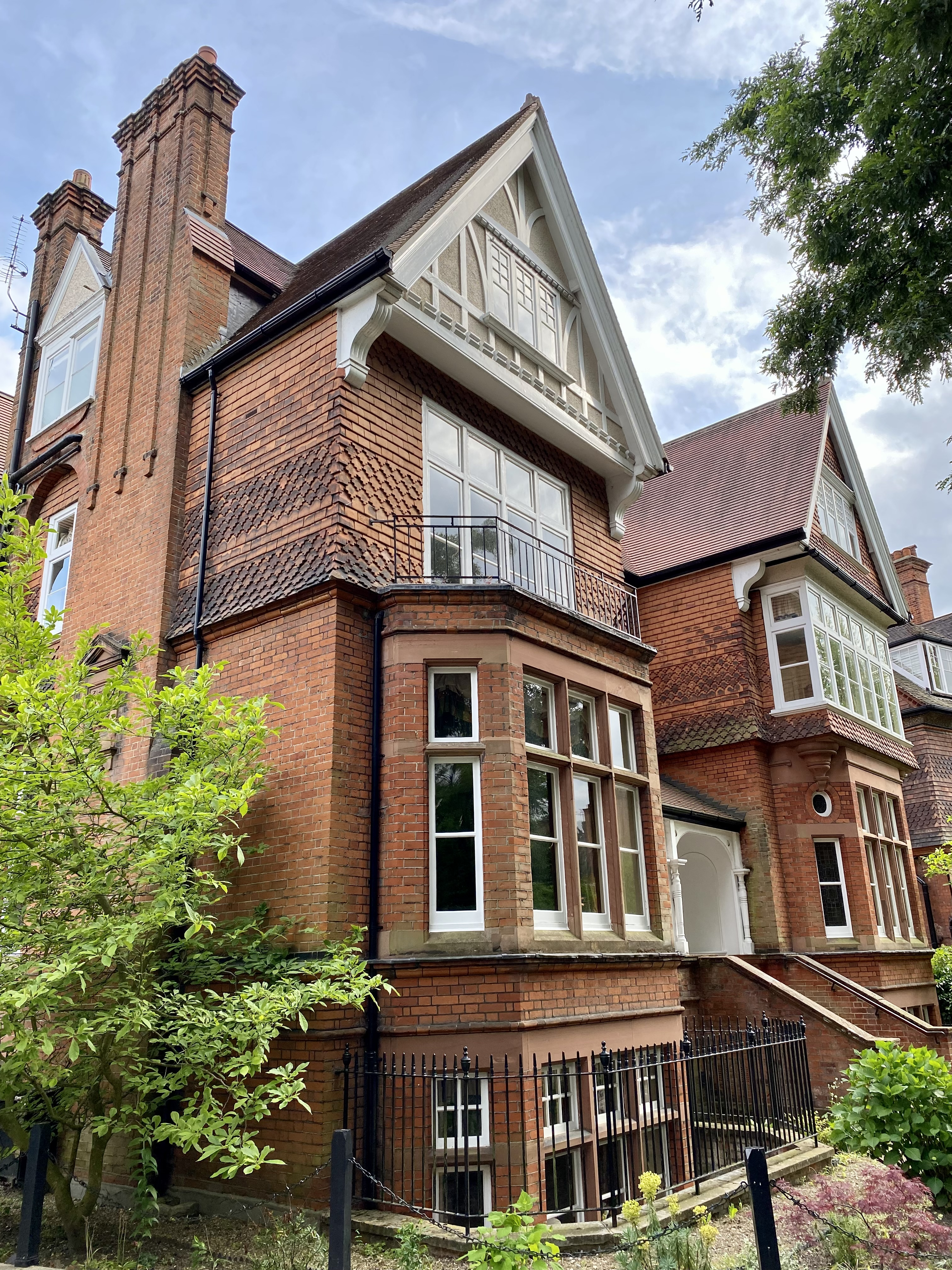
No. 6

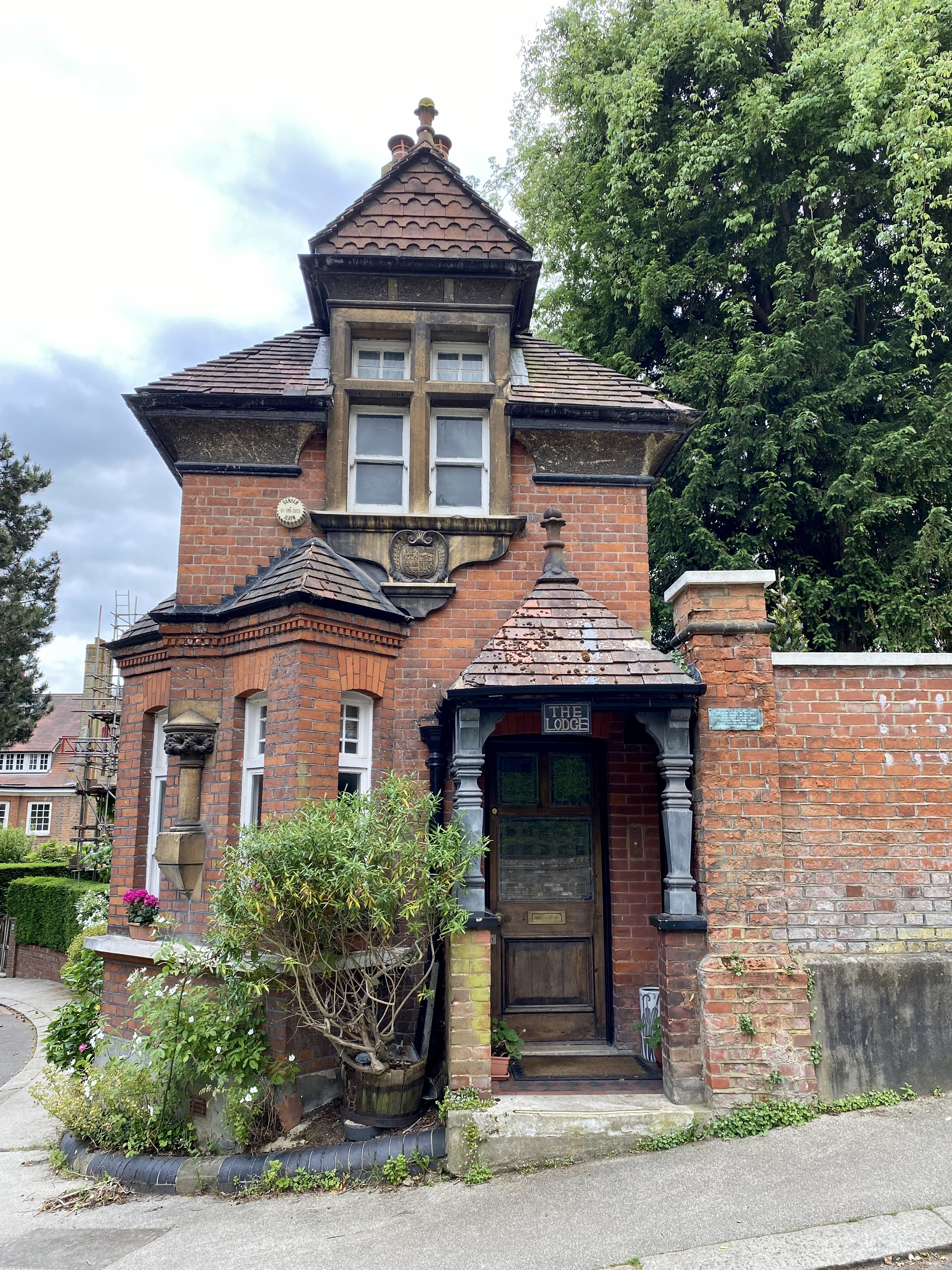
The Lodge to Gainsborough Gardens

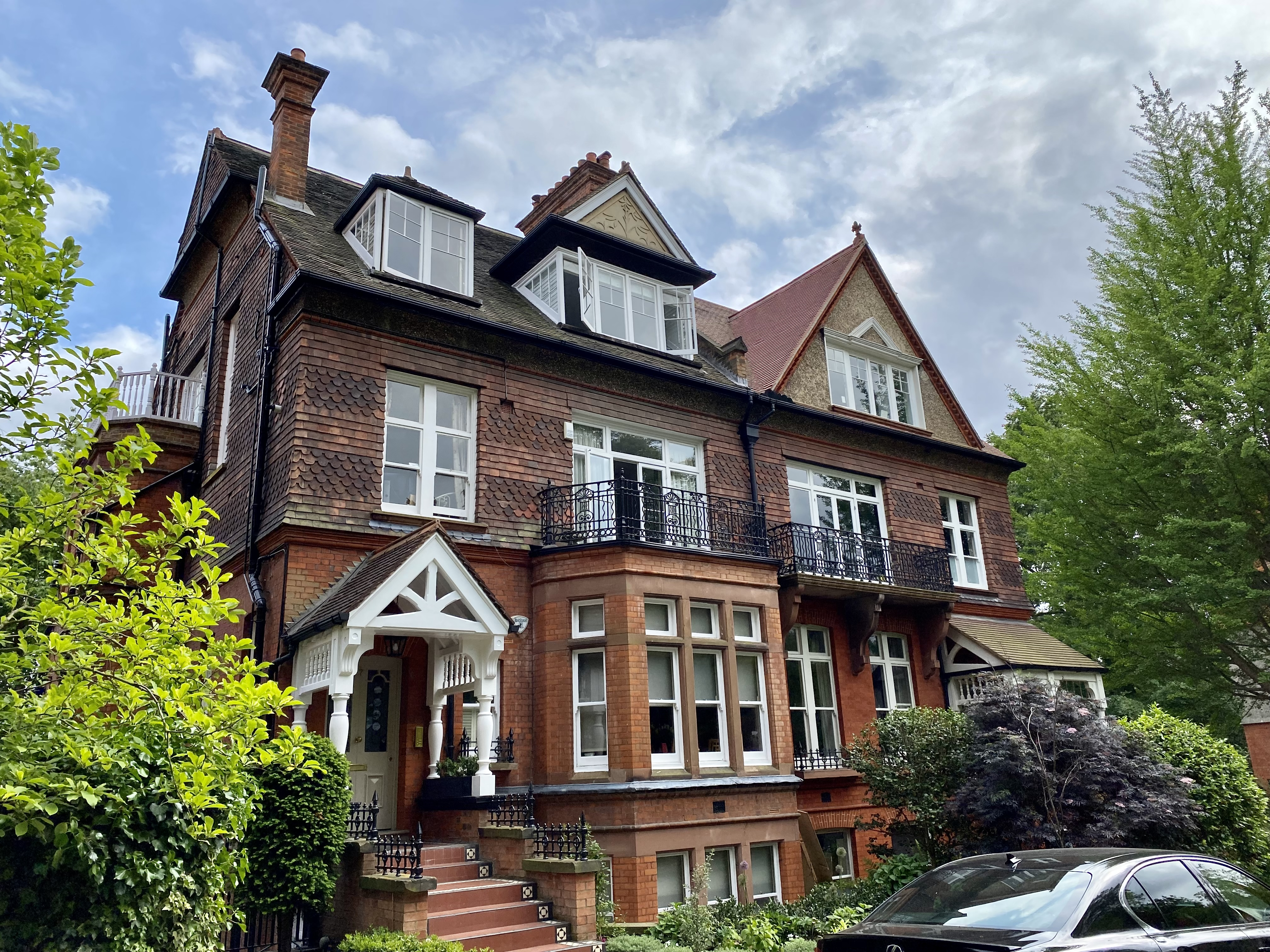
No. 7

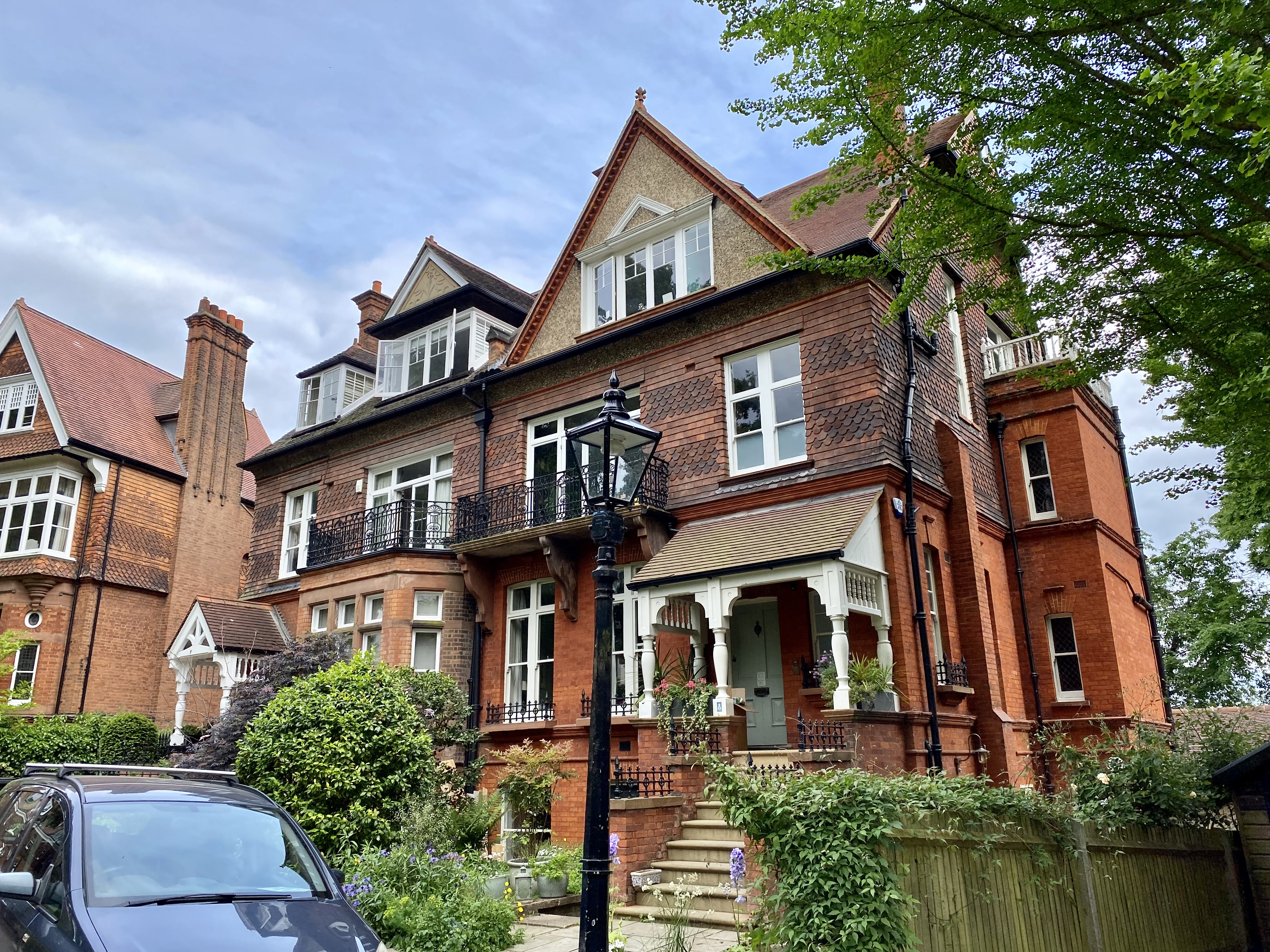
No. 8

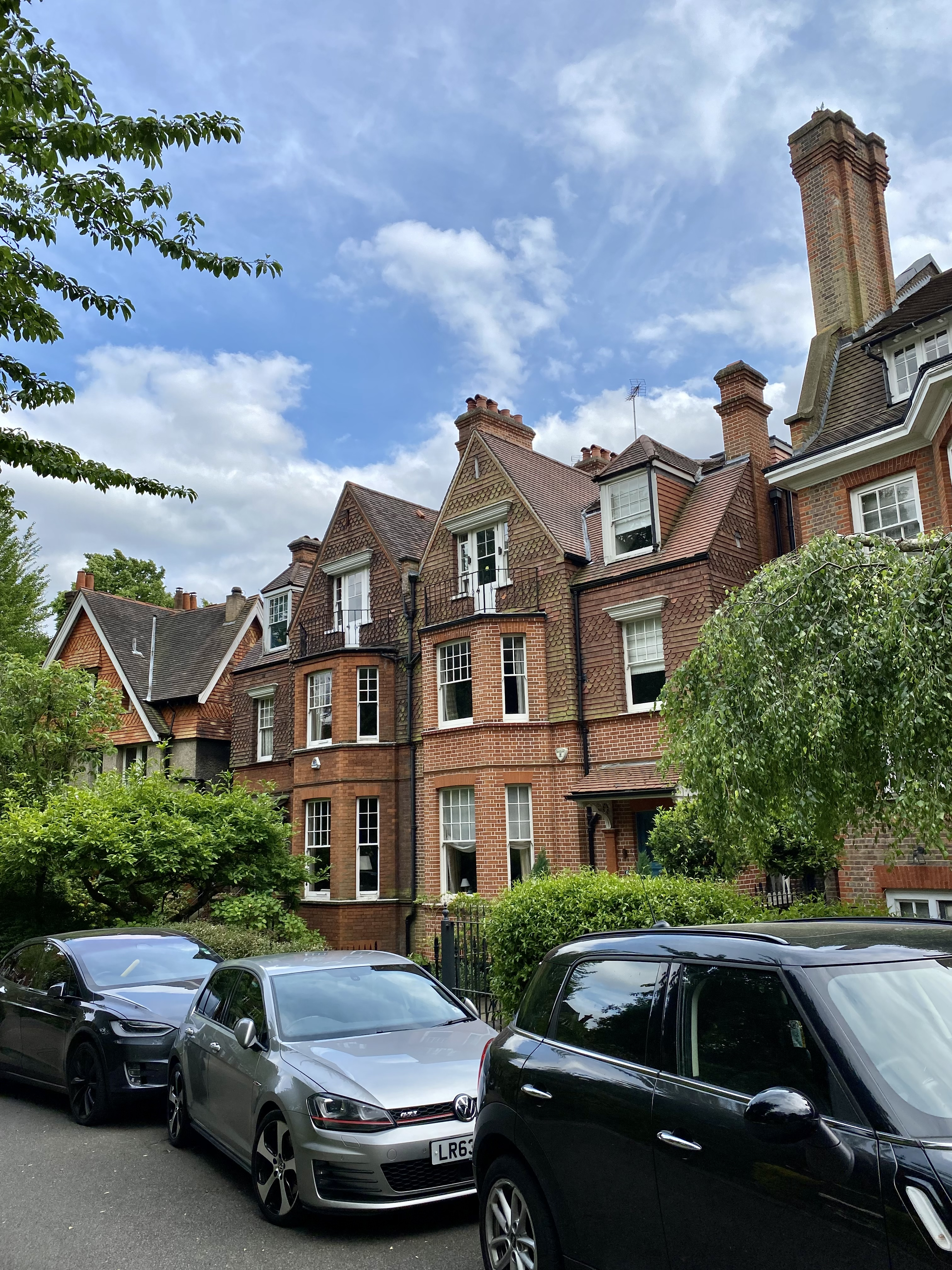
Nos. 9 and 10

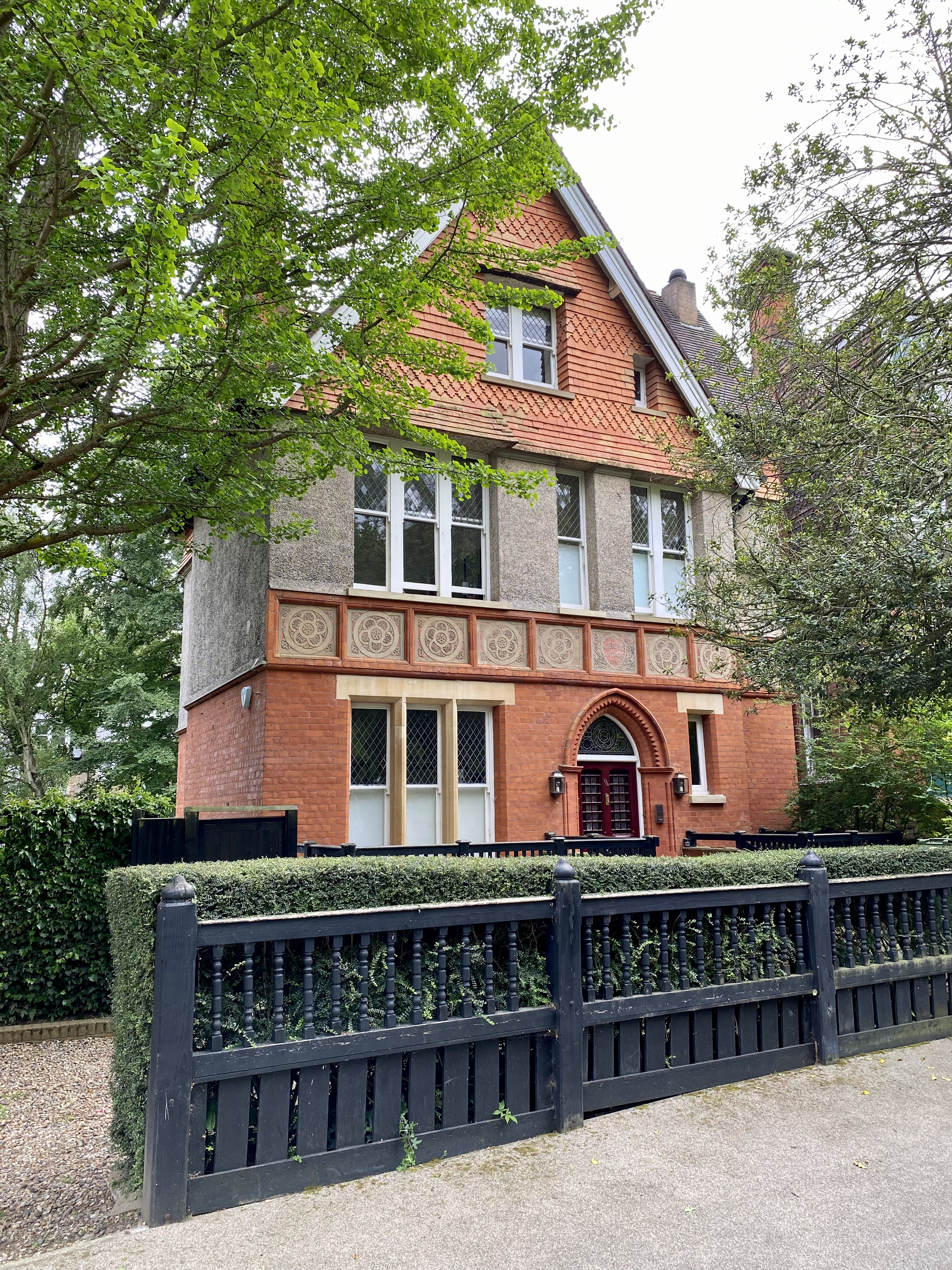
'Eirene Cottage', No. 9a

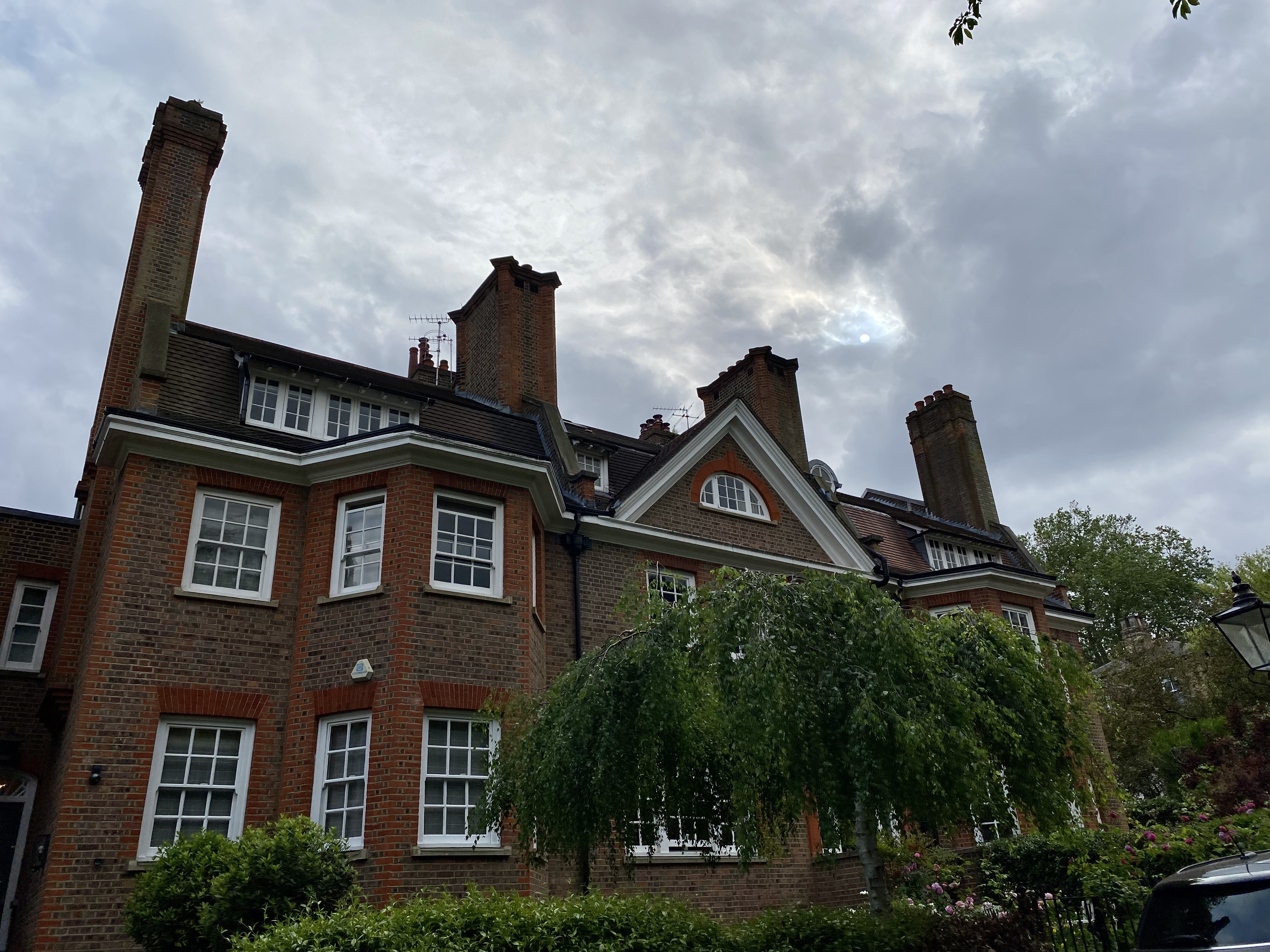
No. 11, 12 and 13

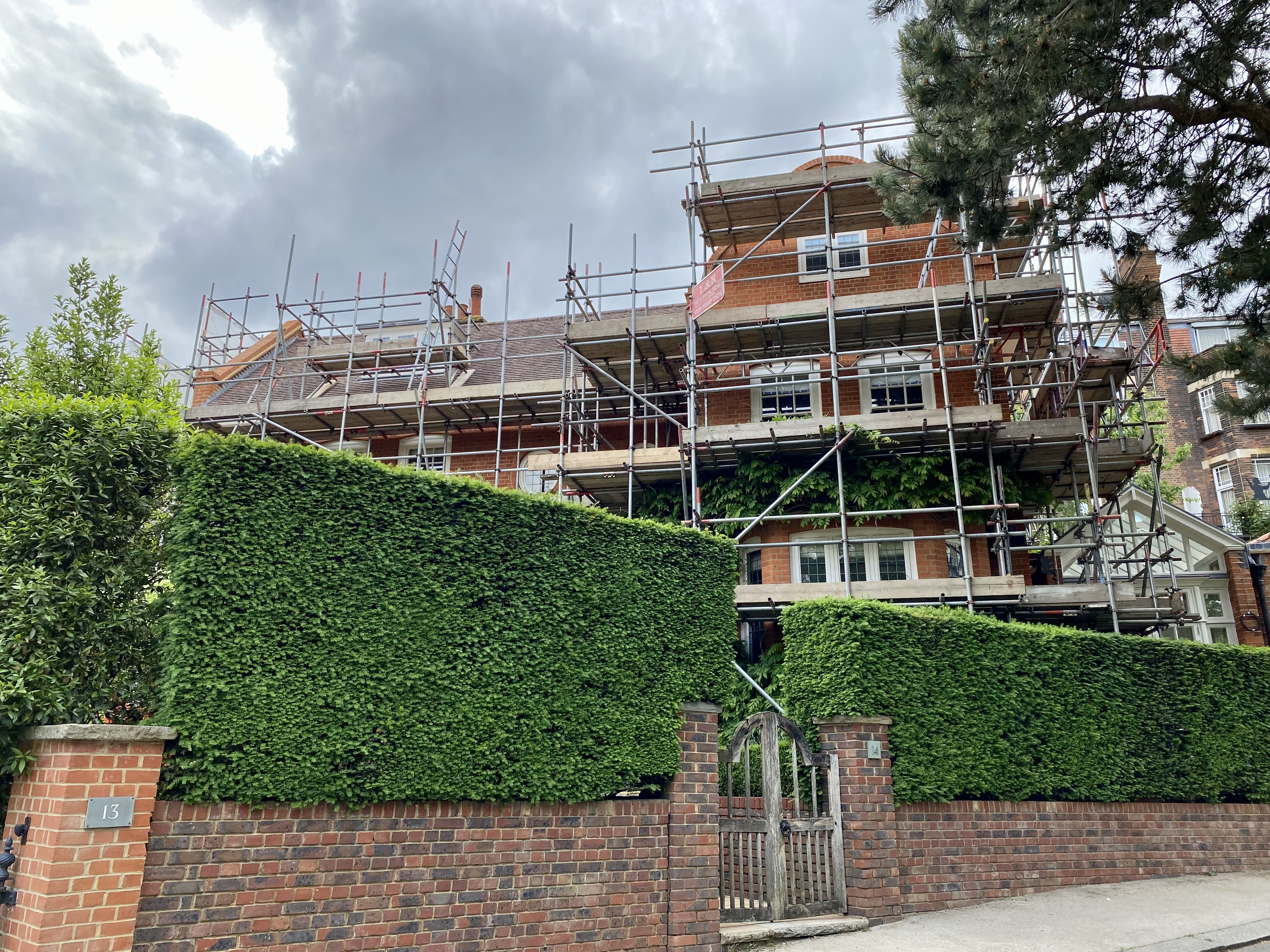
'The Small House', No. 14

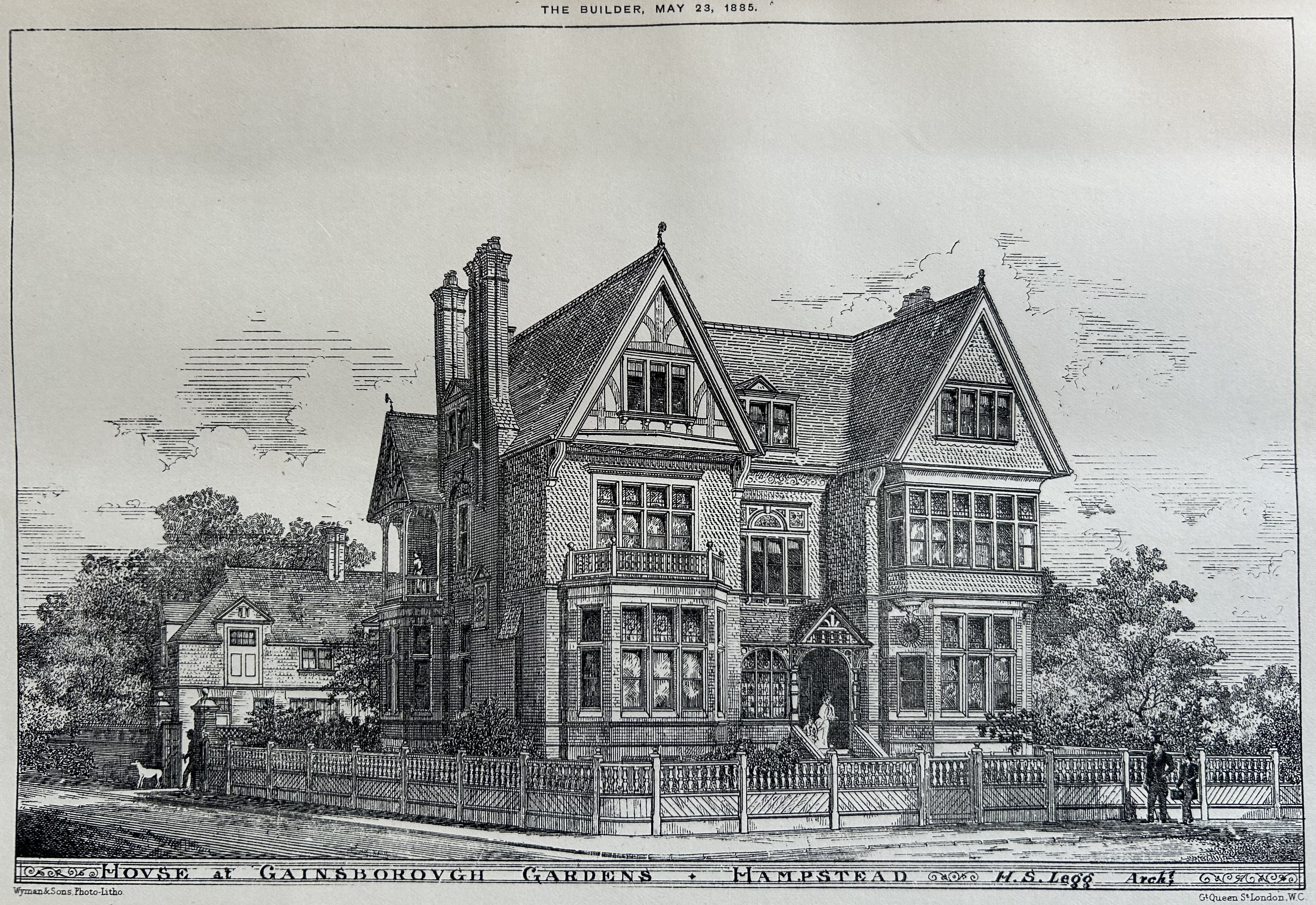
The Builder 23rd May 1885 6 Gainsborough Gardens, Hampstead
