= Henry Simpson Legg =

English Victorian architect

Henry Simpson Legg (1832–1906) was an English architect and surveyor.

== Family ==
His father George Legg (1799–1882) was district surveyor for Belgravia and Pimlico from 1858. Henry and his brother, Charles Arthur Legg (1833–1906), were both pupils of Sir William Tite between 1850 and 1865.

== Career ==
Legg became an Associate of the Royal Institute of British Architects in 1859 and a Fellow in 1873. From 1875 he was surveyor to the Hampstead Wells Trust which owned a large area of land on the eastern side of the village. He was also district surveyor for Mile End Old Town.

Legg died on 23 December 1906 and was buried with his wife and infant son on the eastern side of Highgate Cemetery.

== Works ==
- 81-83 Gracechurch Street, EC3; 1874
- Villa for R. Miley Esq, Boundstone, Surrey; 1874
- Wells Court, Oriel Place, NW3; 1876
- Trinity Church, Finchley Road, NW3; 1878
- 21-27 Well Walk, NW3; 1881
- Chalybeate Well & Drinking Fountain, Well Walk, Hampstead, NW3; 1882
- Wells & Campden Baths and Wash House, Flask Walk, NW3; 1888
- 6, 7, 8, 9, 10 and the gardener's cottage, Gainsborough Gardens, NW3; 1888

== Gallery ==
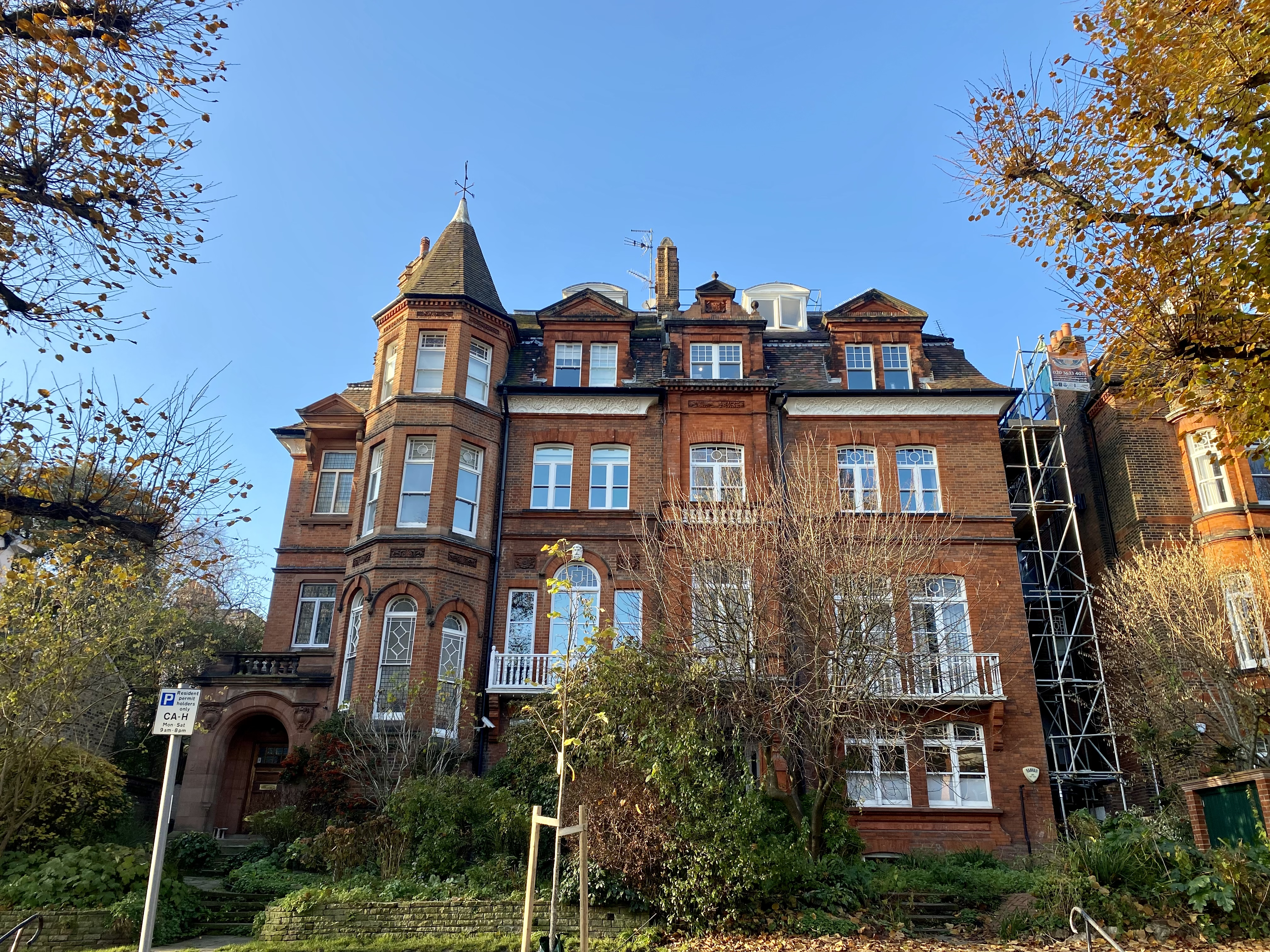
21 & 23 Well Walk, Hampstead

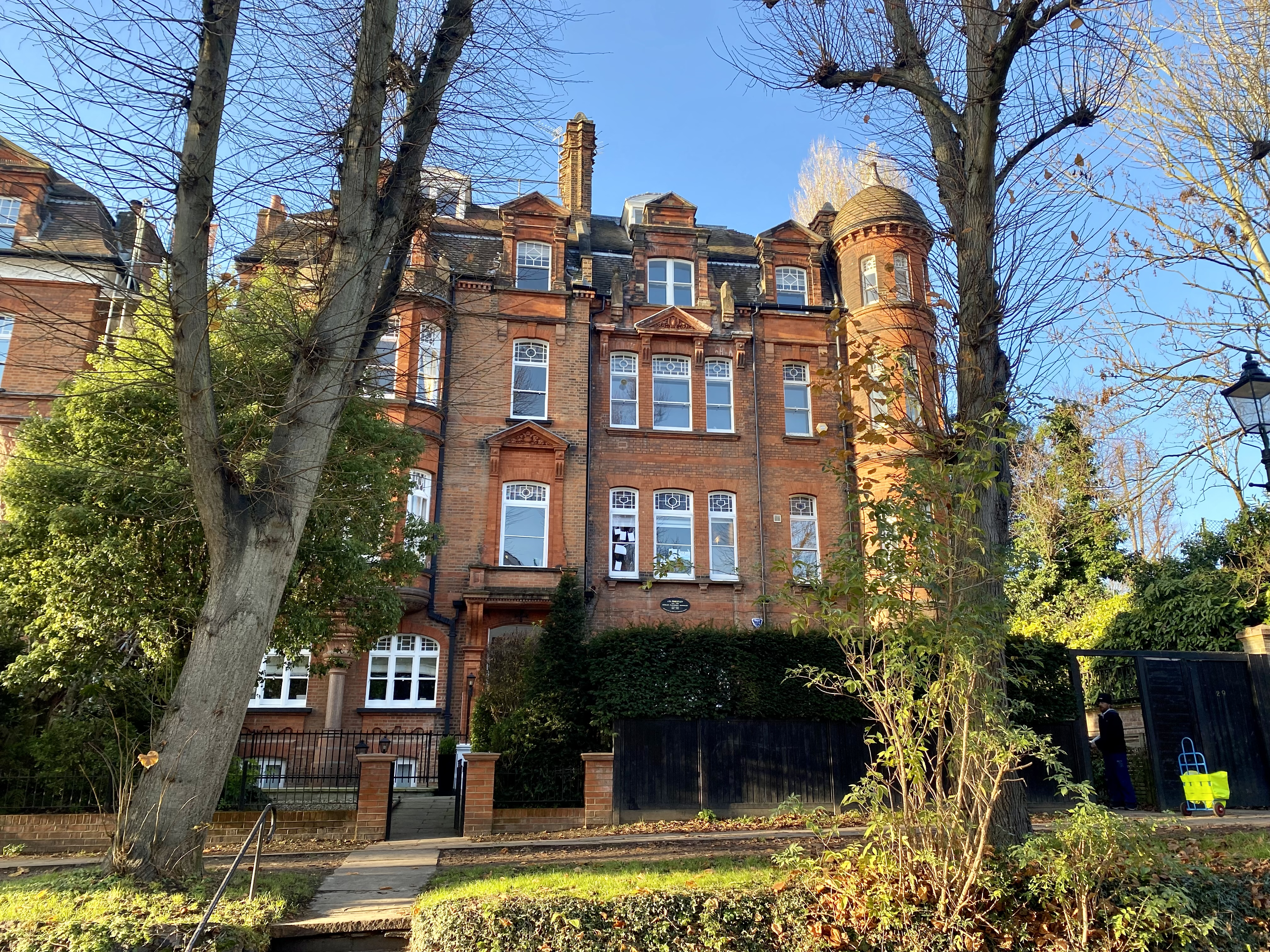
25 & 27 Well Walk, Hampstead

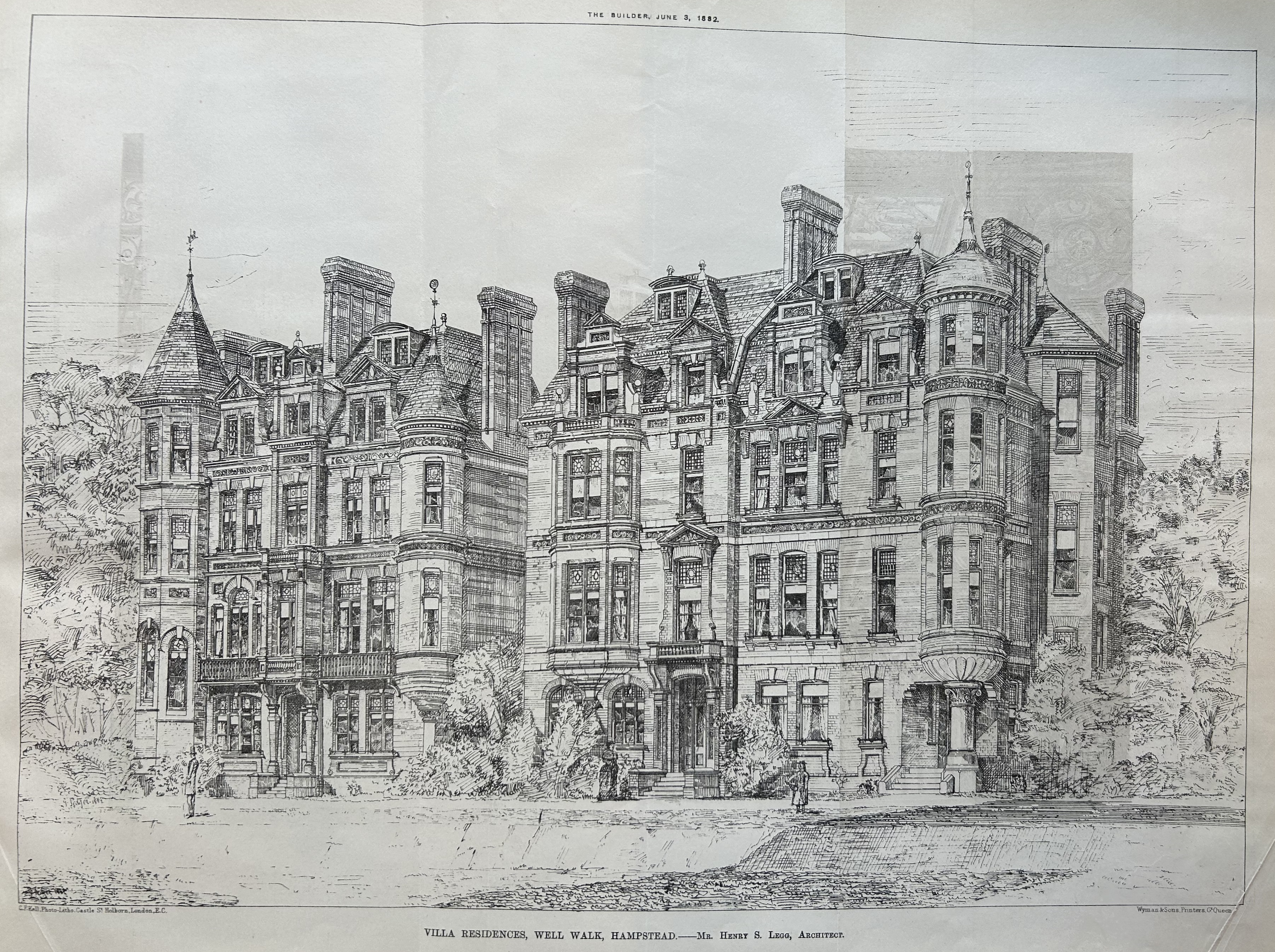
21-27 Well Walk, Hampstead

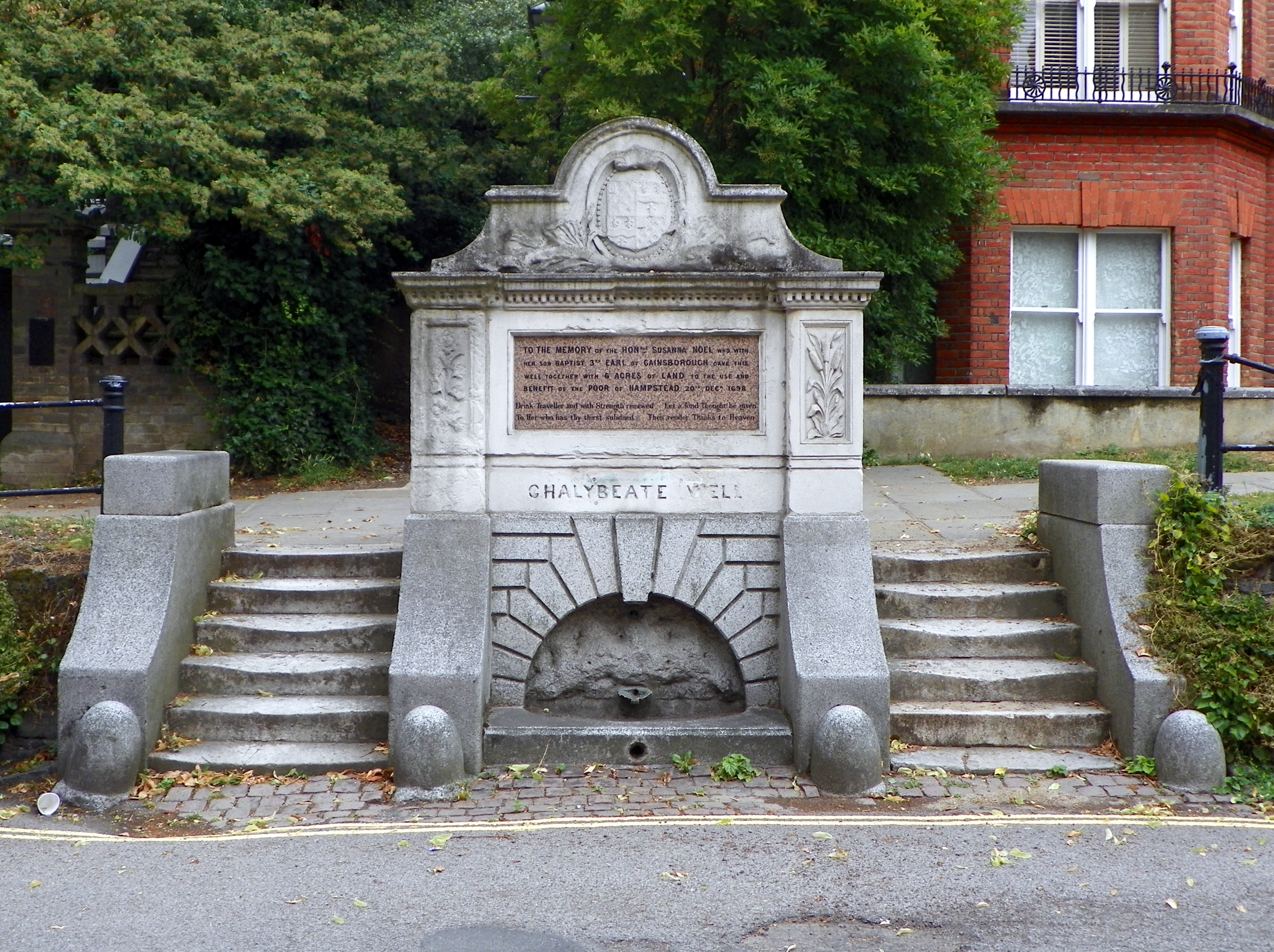
The Chalybeate Well, Hampstead

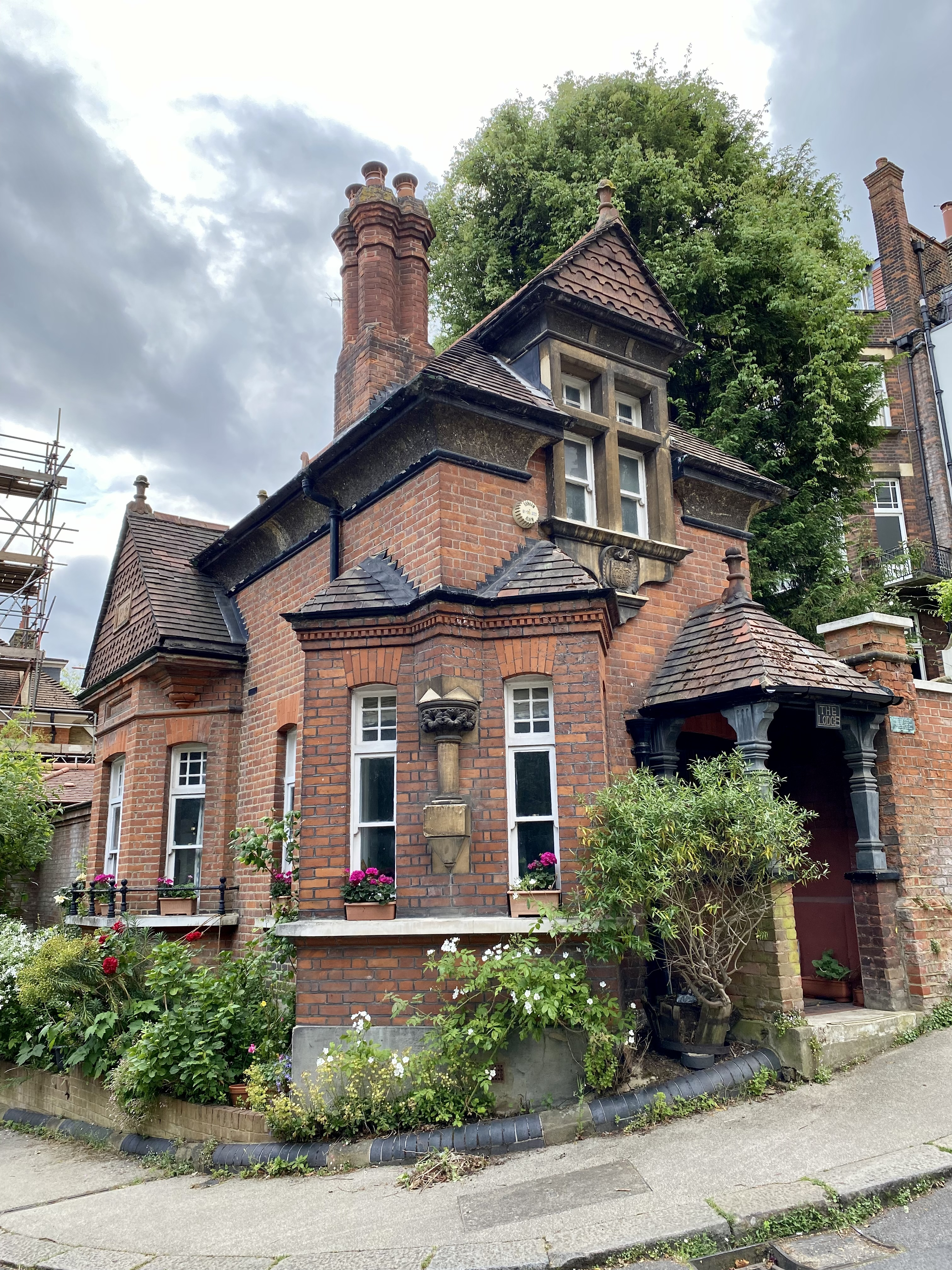
The gardener's cottage, Gainsborough Gardens, Hampstead

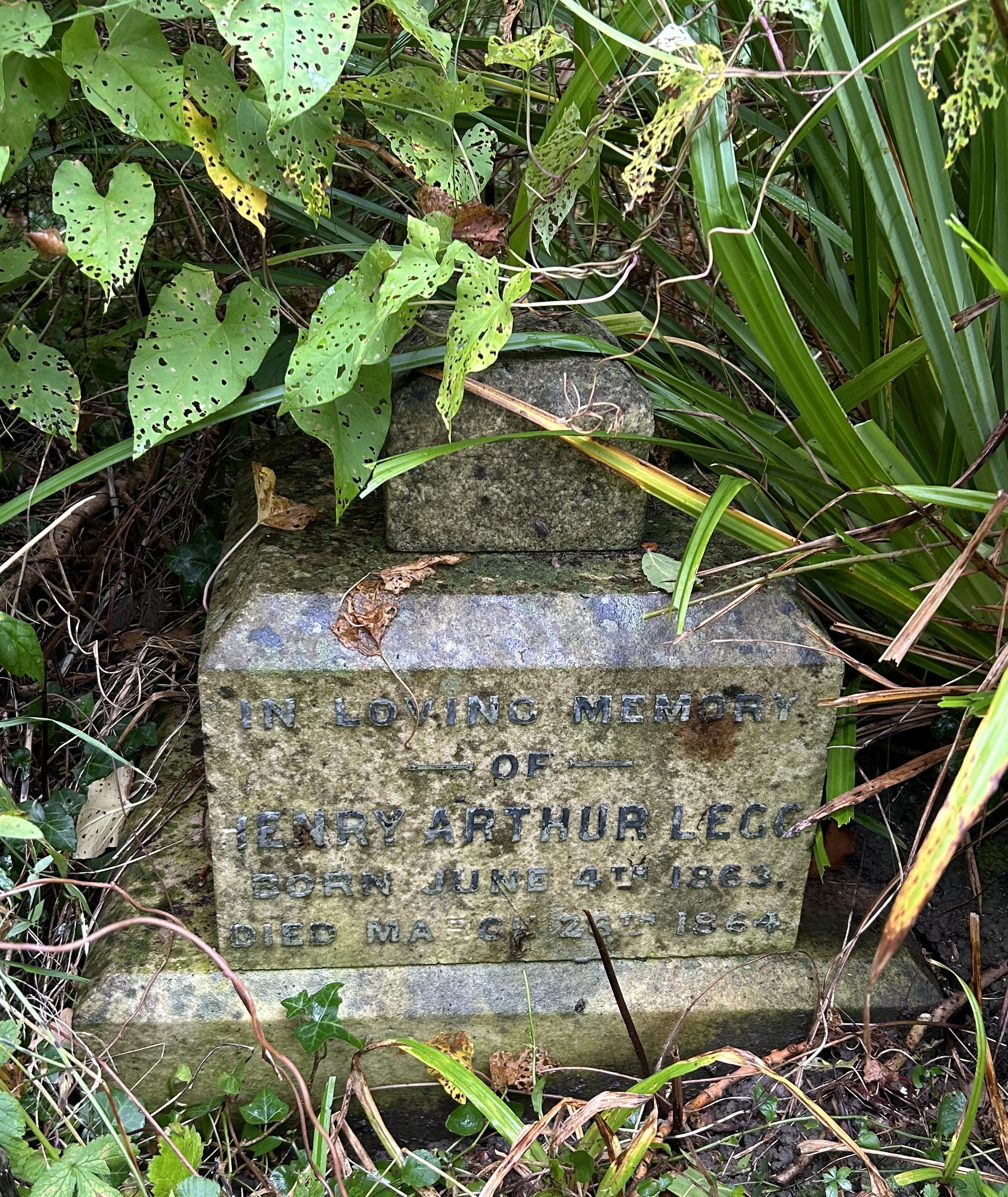
Family grave of Henry Simpson Legg in Highgate Cemetery
