= E. J. May =

British architect (Edward John May; 1853–1941)

E. J. May

Edward John May (1853–1941) was an English architect.

== Career ==
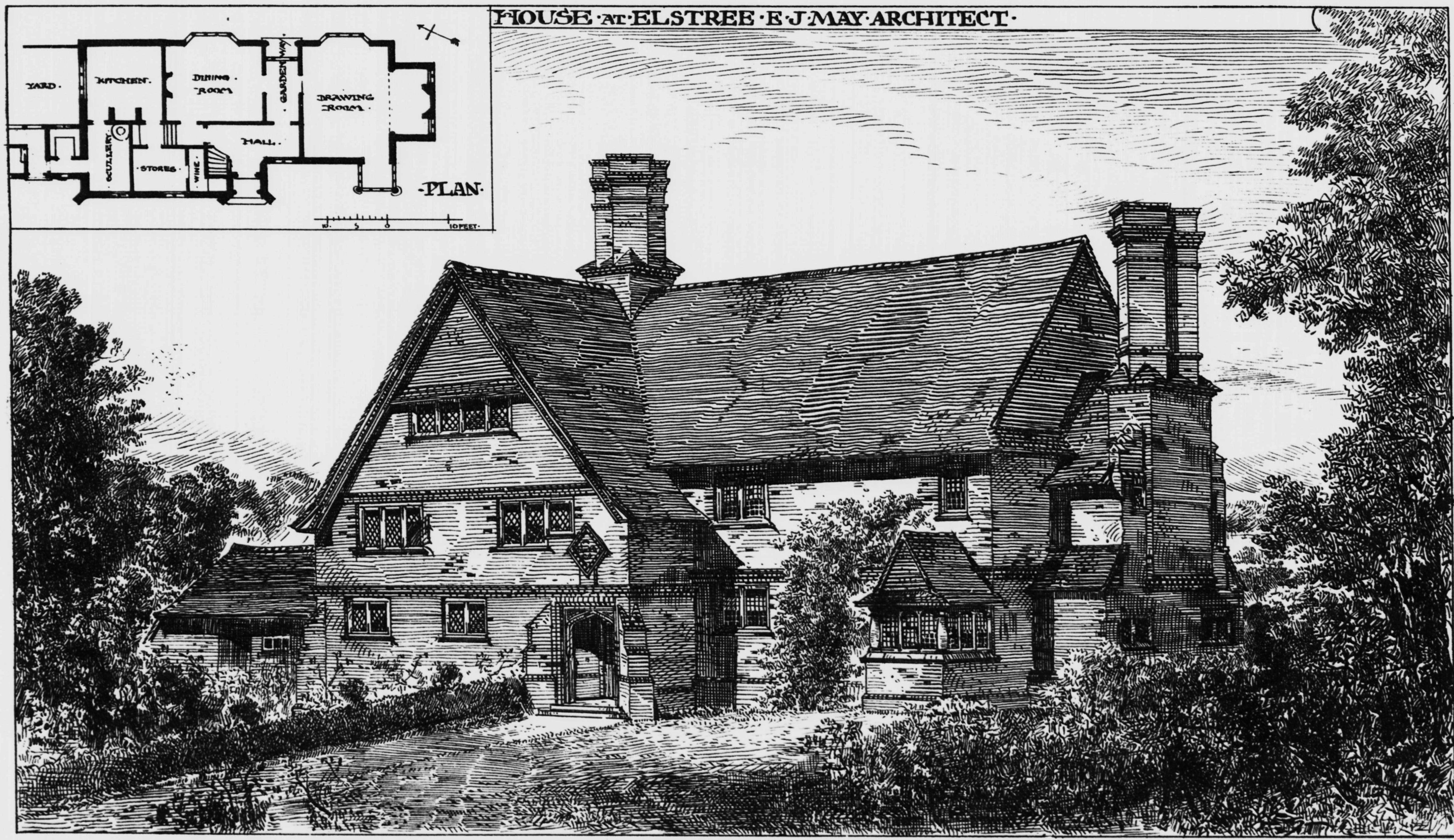
House at Elstree designed by May, and exhibited at the Royal Academy in 1887

E. J. May was the last pupil of Decimus Burton. He then went to assist Eden Nesfield, who was at the time working in partnership with Richard Norman Shaw. He entered the Royal Academy Schools in 1873, and won the RIBA Pugin Prize in 1876.

Shaw commended May as Estate Architect at Bedford Park, London in 1880 and May held that post until 1885. He lived at 6 Queen Anne's Grove, Bedford Park from 1881 to 1890.

He was architect to the Church of England Waifs and Strays Society and to the Governesses' Benevolent Institution. His office was at Hart Street, Bloomsbury, London. He retired in 1932.

From the 1890s he was a resident of Chislehurst, Kent, where he was responsible for a wide range of houses. He lived firstly on Willow Grove, before moving to a house of his own design in 1913. At Chislehurst, he was a Church Warden at the Church of the Annunciation, Chislehurst High Street as well as Secretary of the Parish Nurse Fund.

He died at Chislehurst on 16 March 1941.

== Works up to 1900 ==
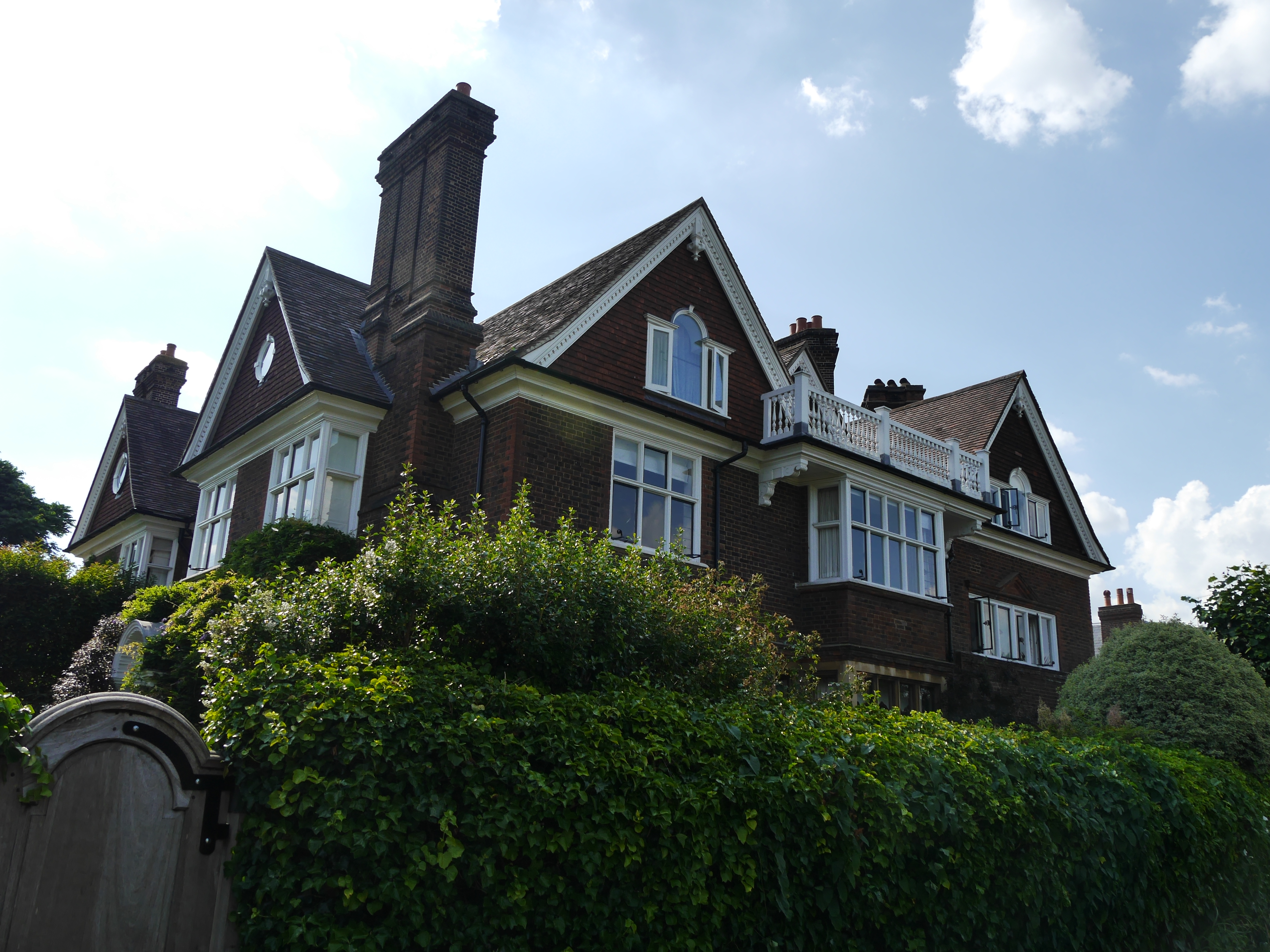
West Lodge, Wimbledon

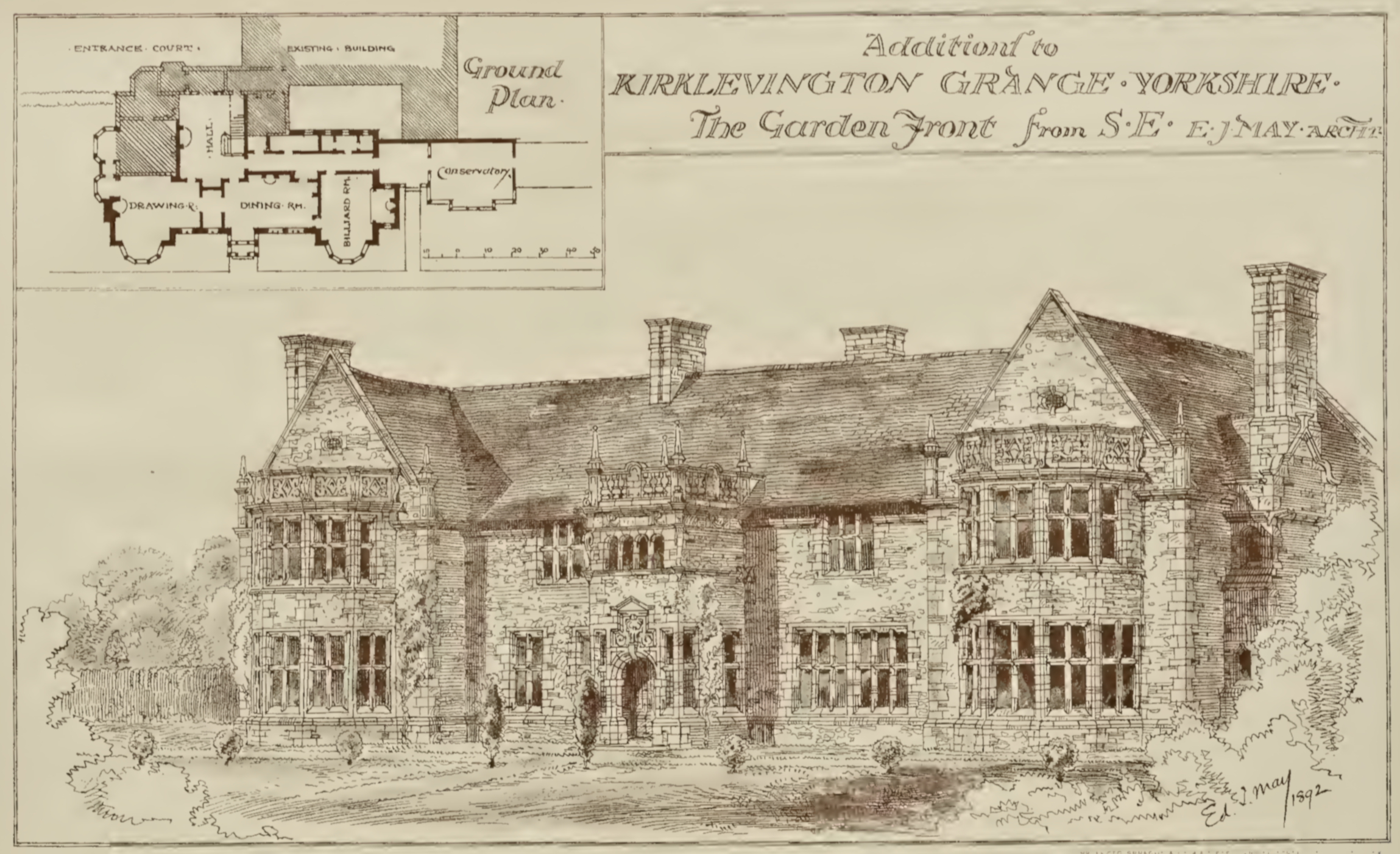
Kirklevington Grange, North Yorkshire

- 1870s – 1880s Houses at Bedford Park
- 1877 No. 1 The Avenue, Bedford Park
- 1879 Club House, Bedford Park
- 1880 No 12 Blenheim Drive, Bedford Park (attrib)
- 1880 Nos 17 – 19 Marlborough Crescent, Bedford Park (attrib)
- 1881 The Vicarage, Bedford Park
- 1882 Nos 21 – 39 Marlborough Crescent, Bedford Park (attrib)
- 1882 Nos 15 – 33 Queen Anne's Grove, Bedford Park
- 1882 Nos 24 – 28 Queen Anne's Grove, Bedford Parkga
- 1882 Nos 2 – 10 Newton Grove, Bedford Park
- 1882 No 1 Newton Grove, Bedford Park
- 1882 No 11 South Parade, Bedford Park (attrib)
- 1882 Master's House, The School, Derby
- 1883 nos 15 – 25 Queen Anne's Grove, London
- 1883 New Hotel Bush Hill Park, Enfield
- 1883 nos 3 – 4 Gainsborough Gardens, Hampstead, London
- 1883 House for Dr Hogg, Priory Gardens, Bedford Park, London
- 1884–85 St Margaret's Terrace, Cromer, Norfolk
- 1884 Swarland Hall, Northumberland
- 1884 Stables, Swarland Hall
- 1884 No 5 The Orchard, Bedford Park
- 1885 House at Wimbledon, London
- 1885 Club Room, Bedford Park
- 1886 Herne's Close, Overstrand Road, Cromer, Norfolk
- 1887 House at Elstree
- 1889 No 2 The Grange, Wimbledon
- 1889 Folkton Manor House
- 1890 Barnsdale Hall, near Oakham, Rutland
- 1891 House at Hampstead
- 1892 Kirklevington Grange, North Riding
- 1892 House in Connecticut, USA
- 1892 Lyneham, Chislehurst, Kent (his own home)
- 1895 The Croft, Hindhead, Surrey
- 1894 West Lodge, Wimbledon
- 1895 Stables at Shaw Hill, Wiltshire
- 1895 Houses at Gainsborough Gardens, Hampstead, London
- 1894-8 Jardine Hall, Drumfrieshire, Scotland
- 1898 Saxby's St Paul's Cray Road, Chislehurst (alts)

== Works 1900 – 1930 ==
- 1900 Homeside, no 4 South Side, Wimbledon
- 1901 Norman Cottage, Morley Road, Chislehurst
- 1902 Falconhurst, no 19 Parkside, Wimbledon
- 1900–05 Branksome Place (formerly Hilders, then Branksome Hilders), Hindhead Rd, Haselmere, Surrey, for Sir Charles McLaren, bt. (later 1st Baron Aberconway)
- 1900–05 Honeyhanger, Haselmere, Surrey, for Sir Charles McLaren, bt. (later 1st Baron Aberconway)
- 1900–05 10 Palace Green, Kensington, London
- 1904 Nos 165 – 169 Lower Camden, Chislehurst
- 1904 New Entrance Lodges, Toddington, Gloucestershire
- 1905 Ballindune, Weydown Road, Haslemere
- 1906–07 Saxby's St Paul's Cray Road, Chislehurst (further alts)
- 1907 Nos 1, 2 and 4 Shepherd's Green, Chislehurst
- 1907 Dunoran, Park Farm Road, Bickley.
- 1908 Nos 3 and 5 Shepherd's Green, Chislehurst
- 1908 House at Webbington, Somerset
- 1908 Three Firs, Hindhead, Surrey
- 1909 Western Motor Works, Perry Street, Chislehurst
- 1909 The Homestead, 9 Holbrook Lane, Chislehurst
- 1910 Waifs and Strays' Home, Pyford, Surrey
- 1910 Working Men's Club (British Legion), 76 Green Lane, Chislehurst
- 1910 Nos 1 – 5 Beaverwood Road, Chislehurst
- 1910 – 11 Guild hall, Sandwich, Kent (alts)
- 1910 White Riggs, Mead Road, Chislehurst
- 1910 Sweet Meadows, Mead Road, Chislehurst
- 1910 Nos 1 5 Beaverwood Road, Chislehurst (attrib)
- 1911 House at Boyne Park, Tunbridge Wells
- 1911 No 48 Parkway, Gidea Park, Essex
- 1911 No 10 Reed Pond Walk, Gidea Park, Essex
- 1911 House at Toddington, Gloucestershire
- 1911 Lych Gate at Church of the Annunciation, High Street, Chislehurst
- 1912 Antokol (formerly Oak House), Holbrook Lane, Chislehurst
- 1913 Wallings (formerly Lyneham), Heathfield Lane, Chislehurst (own house)
- 1913 South Chapel, St Peter, Ealing
- 1914 Millfield, Cricketground Road, Chislehurst (demolished)
- 1915 Red Hatch, 55 Elmstead Lane, Chislehurst (erected 1920)
- 1920s Elmstead Spinney, no 5 Wood Drive, Chislehurst
- 1922 Mainstay Lodge, Holbrook Lane, Chislehurst (demolished)
- 1924 St Anne's Cottage, no 6 The Meadow, Chislehurst
- 1925 Ada Lewis Governesses' Homes, Southend Road, Beckenham, Kent
- 1926 Quatre Fils (formerly Harwood), 41 Holbrook Lane, Chislehurst
- 1927 Lockers, Holbrook Lane, Chislehurst
- 1928 Archway Cottages, Scadbury Estate, Chislehurst
- 1930 Moorcroft (formerly Exbourne), Wilderness Road, Chislehurst
- 1930 Tower at Church of the Annunciation, High Street, Chislehurst
- Lychgate to St Mary's Church, Perivale, Middlesex

== Other work ==
- Sketch of a Queen Anne Interior (Orchard House)
- Royal Academy Exhibitor annually from 1881 to 1892 and also 1894, 1898 and 1900.
