= West Lodge, Wimbledon =

House in Wimbledon, London, England

Coordinates: 51.422845°N 0.227494°W

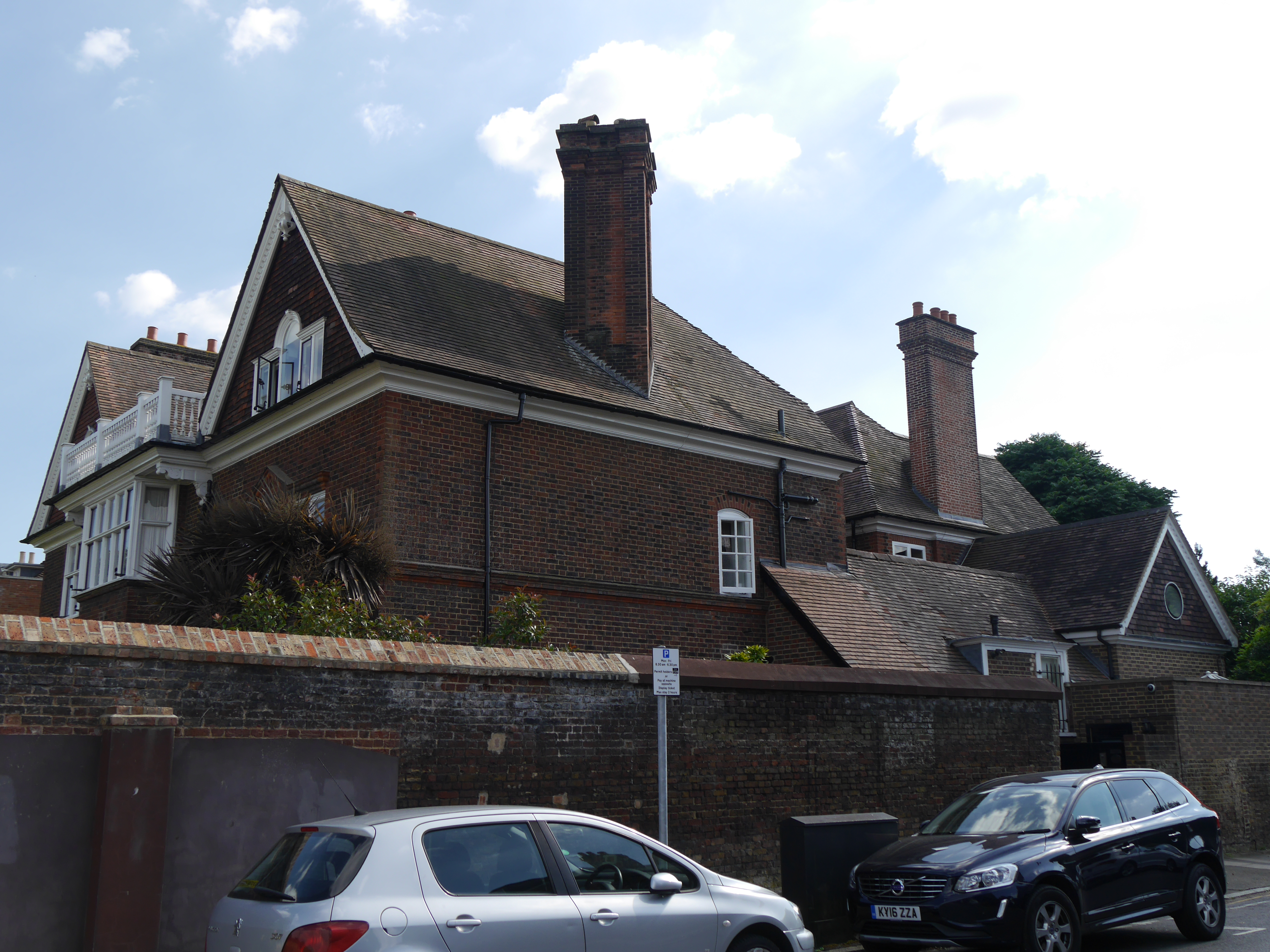
West Lodge, 2016

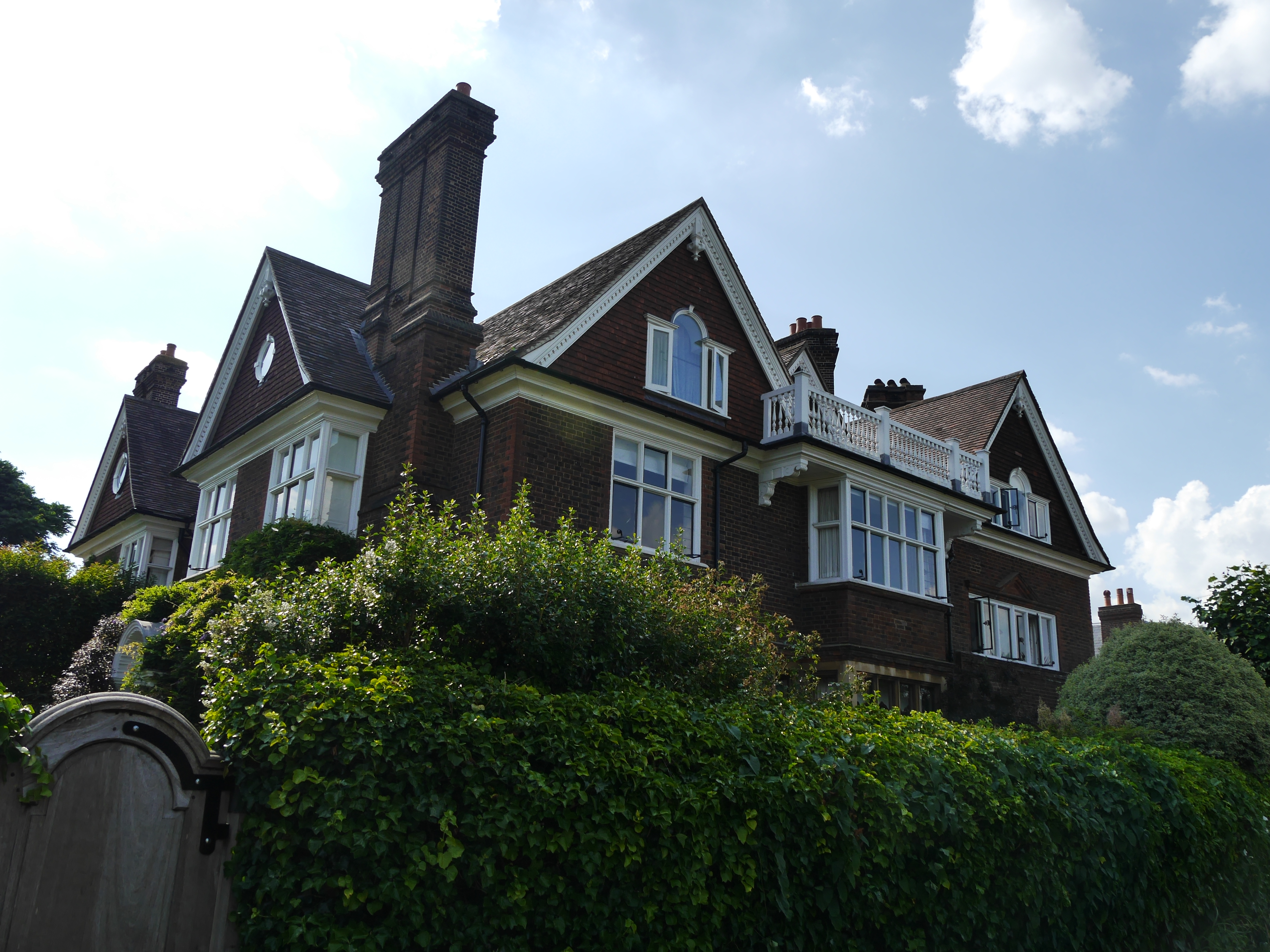
West Lodge, 2016

West Lodge is a Grade II listed house on the west side of Wimbledon Common, Wimbledon, London, built in 1894, and designed by E. J. May.
