= Grade II* listed buildings in the London Borough of Camden =

There are over 20,000 Grade II* listed buildings in England. This page is a list of these buildings in the London Borough of Camden.

== Buildings ==
Name	Location	Type	Completed (Note: The date given is the date used by Historic England as significant for the initial building or that of an important part in the structure's description.)	Date designated	Grid ref. (Note: The grid reference is based on the British national grid reference system, sometimes known as OSGB36, used by the Ordnance Survey.) Geo-coordinates	Entry number (Note: The "List Entry Number" is a unique number assigned to each listed building and scheduled monument by Historic England.)	Image
Alexandra Road Estate Including Walls, Ramps and Steps Community Centre and Boiler House to Alexandra Road Estate Numbers 1–21	Camden	Apartment	1972–1978	18 August 1993	TQ2605683913; 51°32′24″N 0°11′01″W	1130403	Alexandra Road Estate Including Walls, Ramps and Steps Community Centre and Boiler House to Alexandra Road Estate Numbers 1–21 More images
Annesley Lodge, 8 Platts Lane	8 Platts Lane, Hampstead NW3	Apartment	1896	14 May 1974	TQ2524385940; 51°33′30″N 0°11′41″W	1139064	Annesley Lodge, 8 Platts Lane More images
Apothecary House, 47 Highgate West Hill	Highgate West Hill, Highgate N6	Detached House	c. 1730	10 June 1954	TQ2829487445; 51°34′17″N 0°09′01″W	1379044	Apothecary House, 47 Highgate West Hill More images
Baptist Church House, 2, 4 and 6, Southampton Row, and Kingsgate House, Catton Street	Camden	Shop	1901–1903	15 February 1982	TQ3052281567; 51°31′05″N 0°07′13″W	1378782	Baptist Church House, 2, 4 and 6, Southampton Row, and Kingsgate House, Catton Street More images
Belsize Fire Station	Belsize Park, 36 Lancaster Grove NW3	Apartment	1912–1915	14 May 1974	TQ2725784525; 51°32′43″N 0°09′58″W	1379277	Belsize Fire Station More images
Black Lion Public House	274 Kilburn High Road	Public House	c. 1898	14 May 1974	TQ2492884302; 51°32′38″N 0°12′00″W	1379254	Black Lion Public House More images
Boundary Wall and Main Gate to Old Hall	1–7 South Grove, Highgate N6	Gate	18th century	10 June 1954	TQ2826987259; 51°34′11″N 0°09′02″W	1378771	Boundary Wall and Main Gate to Old Hall More images
Brownlow House and Attached Railings	50-51 High Holborn, Holborn WC1	House	Late C17/Early 18th century	15 January 1973	TQ3026181225; 51°30′54″N 0°07′27″W	1244498	Brownlow House and Attached Railings More images
Camden Incline Winding Engine House	Gloucester Avenue, Camden Town	Winder House	1837	18 June 1990	TQ2837084035; 51°32′26″N 0°09′01″W	1342073	Camden Incline Winding Engine House
Cannon Hall	14 Cannon Place, Hampstead NW3	House	Early 18th century	11 August 1950	TQ2660286159; 51°33′36″N 0°10′30″W	1244093	Cannon Hall More images
Cannon Lodge	12 Cannon Place, Hampstead NW3	House	Mid 18th century	14 May 1974	TQ2659086139; 51°33′36″N 0°10′31″W	1272517	Cannon Lodge
Central Saint Martins College of Arts and Design (former)	Southampton Row and Theobalds Road, Holborn WC1	Art School	1905–1908	11 November 1982	TQ3050081670; 51°31′08″N 0°07′14″W	1378790	Central Saint Martins College of Arts and Design (former) More images
Chestnut Lodge and Squires Mount	Squires Mount, Hampstead NW3	House	Later alterations	11 August 1950	TQ2662286195; 51°33′38″N 0°10′29″W	1378798	Chestnut Lodge and Squires Mount More images
Christ Church, Albany Street	Camden	Church	1836	10 June 1954	TQ2881782893; 51°31′49″N 0°08′40″W	1378620	Christ Church, Albany Street More images
Church House and the Highgate Society	10, South Grove, Highgate N6	House	Early 18th century	10 June 1954	TQ2842887342; 51°34′13″N 0°08′54″W	1378748	Church House and the Highgate Society More images
Church of All Hallows	Camden	Church	1889–1901	10 June 1954	TQ2786685684; 51°33′20″N 0°09′25″W	1378658	Church of All Hallows More images
Church of St Alban the Martyr	Camden	Church	1861–1862	24 October 1951	TQ3116881781; 51°31′11″N 0°06′39″W	1272353	Church of St Alban the Martyr More images
Church of St George the Martyr	Camden	Chapel of Ease	c. 1706	24 October 1951	TQ3036281901; 51°31′16″N 0°07′21″W	1245485	Church of St George the Martyr More images
Church of St Luke	Camden	Church Hall	1897–1899	14 May 1974	TQ2526785911; 51°33′29″N 0°11′40″W	1379248	Church of St Luke More images
Church of St Luke with St Paul	Camden	Church	c1867-1869	10 June 1954	TQ2949784930; 51°32′54″N 0°08′02″W	1113230	Church of St Luke with St Paul More images
Church of St Mary Brookfield	Camden	Church	1869–1875	10 June 1954	TQ2896486183; 51°33′35″N 0°08′28″W	1067389	Church of St Mary Brookfield More images
Church of St Mary Magdalene	Camden	Church	1849–1852	10 June 1954	TQ2895782422; 51°31′34″N 0°08′33″W	1113157	Church of St Mary Magdalene More images
Church of St Michael	Camden	Church	1880–1881	10 June 1954	TQ2898583993; 51°32′24″N 0°08′29″W	1244156	Church of St Michael More images
Church of St Michael	South Grove, Highgate N6	Church	1832	10 June 1954	TQ2829587174; 51°34′08″N 0°09′01″W	1378767	Church of St Michael More images
Church of St Silas the Martyr	Camden	Church	1911–1913	10 June 1954	TQ2821084693; 51°32′48″N 0°09′09″W	1245853	Church of St Silas the Martyr More images
Circular Ward and Attached Ablution and Water Tank Tower at Former New End Hospital	New End, Hampstead	Kitchen	1884	17 October 1986	TQ2640785961; 51°33′30″N 0°10′41″W	1322108	Circular Ward and Attached Ablution and Water Tank Tower at Former New End Hospital
Cloth Hill	6, The Mount, Hampstead NW3	House	c. 1694	11 August 1950	TQ2632485933; 51°33′29″N 0°10′45″W	1378993	Cloth Hill More images
Congress House Including Forecourt and Courtyard Sculptures	Camden	Sculpture	1953–1957	29 March 1988	TQ2994981473; 51°31′02″N 0°07′43″W	1113223	Congress House Including Forecourt and Courtyard Sculptures More images
Cumberland Footbridge over Grand Union Canal to Outer Circle, Regents Park	Camden	Gate Pier	c. 1864	16 May 1978	TQ2822783649; 51°32′14″N 0°09′09″W	1329910	Cumberland Footbridge over Grand Union Canal to Outer Circle, Regents Park More images
Elm Lodge and Attached Garden Wall	Elm Row, Hampstead NW3	House	c. 1732	14 May 1974	TQ2639586026; 51°33′32″N 0°10′41″W	1078276	Elm Lodge and Attached Garden Wall More images
Englefield House	23, Highgate High Street, Highgate	Terraced House	c. 1710	10 June 1954	TQ2851287365; 51°34′14″N 0°08′50″W	1378900	Englefield House More images
Euston Fire Station Including Boundary Walls, Gatepiers and Railings	Camden	Apartment	1901–1902	14 May 1974	TQ2976482631; 51°31′40″N 0°07′51″W	1342074	Euston Fire Station Including Boundary Walls, Gatepiers and Railings More images
Forecourt Railings and Gate to Number 10	10, South Grove, Camden	Gate	18th century	10 June 1954	TQ2842487355; 51°34′14″N 0°08′54″W	1378750	Forecourt Railings and Gate to Number 10
Freemasons' Hall	Camden	Freemasons Hall	1927–1933	9 March 1982	TQ3047081244; 51°30′54″N 0°07′16″W	1113218	Freemasons' Hall More images
Frognal Grove Including Former Stable Range	105–111 Frognal, Hampstead NW3	Semi Detached House	1950s	11 August 1950	TQ2612585917; 51°33′29″N 0°10′55″W	1113081	Frognal Grove Including Former Stable Range More images
Gardnor House	Flask Walk, Hampstead NW3	House	c. 1736	11 August 1950	TQ2658385858; 51°33′27″N 0°10′32″W	1322202	Gardnor House More images
Grand Connaught Rooms	Holborn, Camden	Freemasons Hall	1774	17 September 2010	TQ3052781284; 51°30′55″N 0°07′13″W	1393970	Grand Connaught Rooms More images
Gray's Inn Square Number 1 and attached railings	Camden	Legal Chambers	c. 1776	24 October 1951	TQ3100781738; 51°31′10″N 0°06′48″W	1322145	Gray's Inn Square Number 1 and attached railings More images
Grays Inn Square Numbers 12, 13 and 14, gatehouse and attached railings	Camden	Terrace	1684–1688	24 October 1951	TQ3106481774; 51°31′11″N 0°06′45″W	1322147	Grays Inn Square Numbers 12, 13 and 14, gatehouse and attached railings
Grays Inn Square Numbers 6, 7 and 8 and attached railings	Camden	Terrace	c. 1676	24 October 1951	TQ3100781823; 51°31′13″N 0°06′47″W	1322146	Grays Inn Square Numbers 6, 7 and 8 and attached railings
St Christopher's Chapel, Great Ormond Street Hospital	Camden	Chapel	1871–1876	10 March 1980	TQ3046082042; 51°31′20″N 0°07′16″W	1113211	St Christopher's Chapel, Great Ormond Street Hospital More images
Hampstead Synagogue	Camden	Synagogue	1892–1901	25 September 1989	TQ2545884984; 51°32′59″N 0°11′31″W	1271984	Hampstead Synagogue More images
Heal and Son Limited including Habitat	Camden	Department Store	1914–1917	14 May 1974	TQ2953181906; 51°31′16″N 0°08′04″W	1379023	Heal and Son Limited including Habitat More images
Heath House	1 North End Way, Hampstead NW3	House	Early 18th century	14 May 1974	TQ2628586484; 51°33′47″N 0°10′46″W	1113183	Heath House More images
Horse Hospital with Ramps and Boundary Wall at North of Site	Stable Yard, Stables Market, Chalk Farm Road, Camden Town, NW1	Stable	1882-3	30 September 1981	TQ2850984257; 51°32′33″N 0°08′54″W	1258100	Horse Hospital with Ramps and Boundary Wall at North of Site
House and Attached Garage	62 Camden Mews, Camden Town, NW1	House	1962-5	15 May 2007	TQ2969684724; 51°32′47″N 0°07′52″W	1392599	House and Attached Garage More images
Institute of Education, Clore Institute of Advanced Legal Studies and accommodation for University College	Camden, Camden	Conference Centre	1970–1976	4 December 2000	TQ2995482136; 51°31′24″N 0°07′42″W	1246932	Institute of Education, Clore Institute of Advanced Legal Studies and accommodation for University College More images
James Smith and Sons, Hazelwood House	Hazelwood House, 53 New Oxford Street WC1A	Workshop	Mid 19th century	11 January 1999	TQ3008181432; 51°31′01″N 0°07′36″W	1113171	James Smith and Sons, Hazelwood House More images
Lauderdale House	Waterlow Park, Highgate N6	House	c. 1760	10 June 1954	TQ2877387236; 51°34′09″N 0°08′36″W	1379128	Lauderdale House More images
Lloyds Bank Numbers 1 and 3 with Railings and Gates to South	40 Rosslyn Hill, Hampstead NW3	Terraced House	c1895-1896	14 May 1974	TQ2679085599; 51°33′18″N 0°10′21″W	1130392	Lloyds Bank Numbers 1 and 3 with Railings and Gates to South More images
London and North Western Railway War Memorial	Euston station	War memorial	1921	11 January 1999	TQ2964182578; 51°31′39″N 0°07′56″W	1342044	London and North Western Railway War Memorial More images
British Museum main entrance gateway, railings and attached lodges	Camden	Porters Lodge	1849	14 May 1974	TQ3013981619; 51°31′07″N 0°07′33″W	1130406	British Museum main entrance gateway, railings and attached lodges
Julius Beer Mausoleum in Highgate (western) Cemetery	Highgate Cemetery, Camden	Mausoleum	c. 1878	14 May 1974	TQ2833487151; 51°34′07″N 0°08′59″W	1378887	Julius Beer Mausoleum in Highgate (western) Cemetery More images
New Hall	Lincolns Inn, Camden	Banqueting House	c1843-1845	24 October 1951	TQ3092381408; 51°30′59″N 0°06′52″W	1379298	New Hall More images
New Hall Library	Lincolns Inn, Camden	Public Library	Circa 1843–1845	24 October 1951	TQ3091481435; 51°31′00″N 0°06′53″W	1379299	New Hall Library More images
Nos. 1–9 Melton Street and Attached Railings	Camden	Government Office	2011	14 May 1974	TQ2951282501; 51°31′36″N 0°08′04″W	1113131	Nos. 1–9 Melton Street and Attached Railings More images
1-3 and 6-9 St Katharine's Precinct	Regent's Park	Terrace	1828	14 May 1974	TQ2861883296; 51°32′02″N 0°08′49″W	1245868	1-3 and 6-9 St Katharine's Precinct More images
Monument in Courtyard	St Katherine's Precinct, Camden	Column	c. 1828	14 May 1974	TQ2861883270; 51°32′01″N 0°08′49″W	1245870	Monument in Courtyard
Number 15 and Attached Boundary Walls and Piers	15 Gloucester Gate, Regent's Park, NW1	Villa	1827–1828	14 May 1974	TQ2860983441; 51°32′07″N 0°08′50″W	1078325	Number 15 and Attached Boundary Walls and Piers More images
Number 2 and Attached Railings	2 Marylebone Road, Regent's Park, NW1	House	Later alterations	10 June 1954	TQ2882082235; 51°31′28″N 0°08′40″W	1113114	Number 2 and Attached Railings More images
5 Church Row	5 Church Row, Hampstead NW3	House	1728	11 August 1950	TQ2631285657; 51°33′20″N 0°10′46″W	1067340	5 Church Row More images
Number 9 and Attached Railings and Gate	9 Church Row, Hampstead NW3	House	Late 19th century	11 August 1950	TQ2629085654; 51°33′20″N 0°10′47″W	1067344	Number 9 and Attached Railings and Gate More images
Numbers 18 and 19 and Attached Railings to Front and Brick Walls to Rear	18 and 19 Church Row, Hampstead NW3	House	Late 19th century	11 August 1950	TQ2629585620; 51°33′19″N 0°10′47″W	1271912	Numbers 18 and 19 and Attached Railings to Front and Brick Walls to Rear More images
Number 20 and Attached Railings	20 Church Row, Hampstead NW3	Terraced House	c. 1720	11 August 1950	TQ2630485622; 51°33′19″N 0°10′46″W	1271913	Number 20 and Attached Railings More images
Number 21 and Attached Railings to Front and Brick Walls to Rear	21 Church Row, Hampstead NW3	House	Late 19th century	11 August 1950	TQ2631085624; 51°33′19″N 0°10′46″W	1271914	Number 21 and Attached Railings to Front and Brick Walls to Rear More images
Number 22 and Attached Railings	22 Church Row, Hampstead NW3	House	Late 19th century	11 August 1950	TQ2631785626; 51°33′19″N 0°10′46″W	1271915	Number 22 and Attached Railings More images
Number 23 and Attached Railings	23 Church Row, Hampstead NW3	House	Late 19th century	11 August 1950	TQ2632485627; 51°33′19″N 0°10′45″W	1271916	Number 23 and Attached Railings More images
Numbers 24–28 and Attached Railings to Front and Walls to Rear	24–28 Church Row, Hampstead NW3	House	Late 19th century	11 August 1950	TQ2634785633; 51°33′20″N 0°10′44″W	1271917	Numbers 24–28 and Attached Railings to Front and Walls to Rear More images
Number 3 and Attached Railings, Wall and Lamp	3, The Grove, Highgate	House	c. 1688	10 June 1954	TQ2818187264; 51°34′11″N 0°09′07″W	1378978	Number 3 and Attached Railings, Wall and Lamp More images
Number 4 and Attached Railings, Wall and Lamp	4, The Grove, Highgate	House	c. 1688	10 June 1954	TQ2818087276; 51°34′11″N 0°09′07″W	1378979	Number 4 and Attached Railings, Wall and Lamp More images
Number 6 and Attached Railings, Wall and Lamp	6, The Grove, Highgate	House	C20	10 June 1954	TQ2817787308; 51°34′12″N 0°09′07″W	1378981	Number 6 and Attached Railings, Wall and Lamp
Number 3 to 16 and Attached Railings	Great James Street, Camden	Terrace	1720–1724	24 October 1951	TQ3075981948; 51°31′17″N 0°07′00″W	1113197	Number 3 to 16 and Attached Railings
Numbers 26 to 37 and 39 to 40 and attached railings	Great James Street, Holborn, WC1	Terraced House	1720–1724	24 October 1957	TQ3073781943; 51°31′17″N 0°07′01″W	1113203	Numbers 26 to 37 and 39 to 40 and attached railings More images
Number 40 and Attached Railings, Walls and Gates	Well Walk, Hampstead NW3	House	Late 19th century	11 August 1950	TQ2672486033; 51°33′32″N 0°10′24″W	1379169	Number 40 and Attached Railings, Walls and Gates More images
Number 46 and Attached Railings and Wall	46 Well Walk, Hampstead NW3	House	Late 18th century	11 August 1950	TQ2673286047; 51°33′33″N 0°10′24″W	1379170	Number 46 and Attached Railings and Wall More images
Number 46 and Attached Railings	46 Grafton Terrace, Belsize Park, NW5	Terraced House	Mid 19th century	14 May 1974	TQ2798585053; 51°32′59″N 0°09′20″W	1113066	Number 46 and Attached Railings
Number 58 and Attached Railings	Grafton Way, Camden	Terraced House	c. 1792	19 November 1970	TQ2927282153; 51°31′25″N 0°08′17″W	1113071	Number 58 and Attached Railings More images
Number 6 and Attached Railings	Queen Square, Camden	Apartment	1914	24 October 1951	TQ3033481952; 51°31′17″N 0°07′22″W	1139091	Number 6 and Attached Railings More images
Number 99 and Attached Railings to Areas	99 Great Russell Street, Holborn, WC1B	Terraced House	1680–1700	24 October 1951	TQ2995381530; 51°31′04″N 0°07′42″W	1330376	Number 99 and Attached Railings to Areas More images
Numbers 1 and 3 and Attached Boundary Walls	1 and 3 Lyndurst Terrace, Belsize Park NW3	House	1868	30 September 1983	TQ2665485264; 51°33′07″N 0°10′29″W	1379406	Numbers 1 and 3 and Attached Boundary Walls More images
Numbers 1 to 7 and Attached Railings and Lamp Holder	1-7 Great Ormond Street, Holborn, WC1N	Terrace	1710–1715	24 October 1951	TQ3067782072; 51°31′21″N 0°07′04″W	1322066	Numbers 1 to 7 and Attached Railings and Lamp Holder
Numbers 11, 12 and 15–19 and Attached Railings	11, 12 and 15–19 Fitzroy Square, Fitzrovia, W1T	Terrace	c1827-1828	10 June 1954	TQ2909882131; 51°31′24″N 0°08′26″W	1112995	Numbers 11, 12 and 15–19 and Attached Railings
Numbers 1–11 and Attached Railings	New Square, Lincolns Inn	Building	c1690-1697	24 October 1951	TQ3099981260; 51°30′54″N 0°06′49″W	1379303	Numbers 1–11 and Attached Railings More images
Numbers 11–26 and Attached Railings, Byron Court (number 26)	Camden	House	c. 1950	10 June 1954	TQ3068882380; 51°31′31″N 0°07′03″W	1113118	Numbers 11–26 and Attached Railings, Byron Court (number 26)
Numbers 14–22 and Attached Railings	14-22 Southampton Place, Holborn, WC1A	House	19th century	24 October 1951	TQ3040181560; 51°31′05″N 0°07′19″W	1378773	Numbers 14–22 and Attached Railings
Numbers 15 and 16 and Attached Railings	15 and 16 Bedford Row, Holborn, WC1A	House	1717–1718	24 October 1951	TQ3081681821; 51°31′13″N 0°06′57″W	1244605	Numbers 15 and 16 and Attached Railings
Numbers 17, 19 and 21 and Attached Railings	17, 19, 21, Highgate High Street, Highgate, N6	Terrace	1733	10 June 1954	TQ2852387360; 51°34′14″N 0°08′49″W	1378899	Numbers 17, 19 and 21 and Attached Railings More images
Numbers 1–8 and Attached Railings	1-8 Southampton Place, Holborn, WC1A	Terrace	c1758-1763	24 October 1951	TQ3042081587; 51°31′05″N 0°07′18″W	1378772	Numbers 1–8 and Attached Railings More images
Numbers 1–8, 10–14 and 17–19 and Attached Railings	1–8, 10–14 and 17–19 Park Village West, Regent's Park, NW1	Villa	c. 1832	14 May 1974	TQ2872583366; 51°32′04″N 0°08′44″W	1322057	Numbers 1–8, 10–14 and 17–19 and Attached Railings More images
Numbers 20–32 and Attached Railings	Camden	Terrace	c1832-1835	10 June 1954	TQ2908682063; 51°31′22″N 0°08′27″W	1112996	Numbers 20–32 and Attached Railings More images
Numbers 2–16, 22–34, 36a and 36b and Attached Railings	2–16, 22–34, 36a and 36b Park Village East, Regent's Park, NW1	Villa	1825–1836	14 May 1974	TQ2879383370; 51°32′04″N 0°08′40″W	1322056	Numbers 2–16, 22–34, 36a and 36b and Attached Railings More images
Numbers 29–45 and Attached Railings Including Connaught Hall, University of London (numbers 36–45)	Camden	Terrace	c1825-1826	10 June 1954	TQ2983882313; 51°31′29″N 0°07′47″W	1378967	Numbers 29–45 and Attached Railings Including Connaught Hall, University of London (numbers 36–45) More images
Numbers 4 (the Pastors House) and 5 (st Katherines Hall) and Attached Screen Walls	4 and 5 St Katharine's Precinct, Regent's Park, NW1	Manse	Edwardian	14 May 1974	TQ2864683270; 51°32′01″N 0°08′48″W	1245869	Numbers 4 (the Pastors House) and 5 (st Katherines Hall) and Attached Screen Walls
Numbers 4 to 16 and Attached Railings	Camden	Terrace	1720–1721	24 October 1951	TQ3065082089; 51°31′21″N 0°07′06″W	1322086	Numbers 4 to 16 and Attached Railings
Numbers 45 and 46 and Attached Railings	45 and 46, Highgate West Hill, Highgate N6	Semi Detached House	c. 1729	10 June 1954	TQ2824987434; 51°34′16″N 0°09′03″W	1379042	Numbers 45 and 46 and Attached Railings More images
Numbers 5, 5a and 6 and Attached Railings and Lamp Holder	Camden	House	1744	24 October 1951	TQ3032381600; 51°31′06″N 0°07′23″W	1244506	Numbers 5, 5a and 6 and Attached Railings and Lamp Holder More images
Numbers 6 to 27 and Attached Railings and Lamp Holders	Camden	Terrace	c. 1780	10 June 1954	TQ2852185996; 51°33′30″N 0°08′51″W	1246374	Numbers 6 to 27 and Attached Railings and Lamp Holders
Numbers 8–13 and Attached Railings. Number 11 Incorporating the Former Number 10	Camden	House	Later alterations	24 October 1951	TQ3083081780; 51°31′11″N 0°06′57″W	1244602	Numbers 8–13 and Attached Railings. Number 11 Incorporating the Former Number 10
Numbers 9 and 10 and Attached Railings	Fitzroy Square, Fitzrovia	House	Mid 19th century	10 June 1954	TQ2915082160; 51°31′25″N 0°08′23″W	1112994	Numbers 9 and 10 and Attached Railings More images
Old Church of St Pancras	Camden	Chapel of Ease	1822	10 June 1954	TQ2978683438; 51°32′06″N 0°07′49″W	1113246	Old Church of St Pancras More images
Old Hall Numbers 1–7	1–7 South Grove, Highgate N6	House	c. 1694	10 June 1954	TQ2827187236; 51°34′10″N 0°09′02″W	1378770	Old Hall Numbers 1–7 More images
Parnell House	Camden	Model Dwelling	1849	14 May 1974	TQ3000581476; 51°31′02″N 0°07′40″W	1378865	Parnell House More images
Philips Building, School of Oriental and African Studies	Camden	Library	1970-3	20 May 2011	TQ2988582061; 51°31′21″N 0°07′45″W	1401342	Philips Building, School of Oriental and African Studies More images
Powis House and attached railings	Camden	House	c. 1685	24 October 1951	TQ3061881399; 51°30′59″N 0°07′08″W	1379336	Powis House and attached railings More images
Presbytery to Roman Catholic Italian Church of St Peter Roman Catholic Italian Church of St Peter	Camden	Priests House	1862–1865	14 May 1974	TQ3128682071; 51°31′20″N 0°06′33″W	1356763	Presbytery to Roman Catholic Italian Church of St Peter Roman Catholic Italian Church of St Peter More images
Primrose Hill Tunnels (eastern Portals)	Camden	Railway Tunnel Portal	1837 Northern	14 May 1974	TQ2756684231; 51°32′33″N 0°09′43″W	1329904	Primrose Hill Tunnels (eastern Portals) More images
Princess Louise public house	Camden	Public House	19th century	15 January 1973	TQ3043381491; 51°31′02″N 0°07′18″W	1378884	Princess Louise public house More images
Prudential Assurance Building	Camden	Office building	1901	3 March 1972	TQ3121481665; 51°31′07″N 0°06′37″W	1379064	Prudential Assurance Building More images
Rock House	Camden	House	Mid/Late 18th century	10 June 1954	TQ2833287359; 51°34′14″N 0°08′59″W	1139066	Rock House More images
Roman Catholic Church of St Mary	4 Holly Walk, Hampstead	Roman Catholic Chapel	c. 1816	11 August 1950	TQ2625085793; 51°33′25″N 0°10′49″W	1379106	Roman Catholic Church of St Mary More images
Roman Catholic Priory Church of St Dominic	Southampton Row, Belsize Park	Roman Catholic Church	1874–1883	14 May 1974	TQ2786485151; 51°33′03″N 0°09′26″W	1378775	Roman Catholic Priory Church of St Dominic More images
Russell Hotel and Attached Railings with Piers and Lamps	Camden	Gate Pier	1892–1898	3 December 1970	TQ3017882085; 51°31′22″N 0°07′30″W	1246152	Russell Hotel and Attached Railings with Piers and Lamps More images
Senate House, University of London (and formerly the Institute of Education) and Attached Railings	Camden	Gate	1932–1938	28 March 1969	TQ2992381896; 51°31′16″N 0°07′44″W	1113107	Senate House, University of London (and formerly the Institute of Education) and Attached Railings More images
Service Wing and Outbuildings to Kenwood House	Kenwood, Camden	Kitchen	1793–1795	10 June 1954	TQ2713087466; 51°34′18″N 0°10′01″W	1379244	Service Wing and Outbuildings to Kenwood House
Sham Bridge to South of Kenwood House	Kenwood, Camden	Balustrade	c. 1767	10 June 1954	TQ2730887157; 51°34′08″N 0°09′52″W	1379245	Sham Bridge to South of Kenwood House More images
Stanfield House and Attached Railings	85 and 86, Hampstead High Street, Hampstead NW3	House	19th century	11 August 1950	TQ2654985619; 51°33′19″N 0°10′34″W	1378695	Stanfield House and Attached Railings More images
Statue of Charles James Fox	Camden	Statue	Completed 1814	24 October 1951	TQ3031081710; 51°31′09″N 0°07′24″W	1244458	Statue of Charles James Fox More images
Sun House	Camden	House	1935–1936	14 May 1974	TQ2618185542; 51°33′17″N 0°10′53″W	1322140	Sun House More images
Catacombs and Terrace in Highgate (western) Cemetery	Camden	Balustrade	c1838-1839	14 May 1974	TQ2832387163; 51°34′07″N 0°09′00″W	1378923	Catacombs and Terrace in Highgate (western) Cemetery More images
The Danish Church	Camden	Collegiate Chapel	1826–1828	10 June 1954	TQ2864783280; 51°32′02″N 0°08′48″W	1245872	The Danish Church More images
Hall and Attached Railings South Square	South Square, Gray's Inn, Holborn WC1	Banqueting House	Earlier origins	24 October 1951	TQ3103781727; 51°31′09″N 0°06′46″W	1322154	Hall and Attached Railings South Square More images
The Hill Garden Bridge	Inverforth Close, Hampstead NW3	Arch Bridge	c. 1912	14 December 1978	TQ2607386707; 51°33′55″N 0°10′57″W	1113195	The Hill Garden Bridge More images
The Hill Garden Central Temple Summerhouse	Inverforth Close, Hampstead NW3	Balustrade	c. 1912	14 December 1978	TQ2606586710; 51°33′55″N 0°10′57″W	1113199	The Hill Garden Central Temple Summerhouse
The Hill Garden Cruciform Pergola	Inverforth Close, Hampstead NW3	Conservatory	c1906-1910	14 December 1978	TQ2609686701; 51°33′54″N 0°10′56″W	1113202	The Hill Garden Cruciform Pergola
The Hill Garden Southern Pergola and Terrace	Inverforth Close, Hampstead NW3	Belvedere	c1906-1910	14 December 1978	TQ2610686626; 51°33′52″N 0°10′55″W	1322065	The Hill Garden Southern Pergola and Terrace
The Hill Garden Southern Summerhouse	Inverforth Close, Hampstead NW3	Garden Wall	c1906-1910	14 December 1978	TQ2610786600; 51°33′51″N 0°10′55″W	1322067	The Hill Garden Southern Summerhouse More images
The Hill Garden Western Pergola	Inverforth Close, Hampstead NW3	Balustrade	c. 1912	14 December 1978	TQ2602486711; 51°33′55″N 0°11′00″W	1322069	The Hill Garden Western Pergola
The Hill Garden Western Summerhouse	Inverforth Close, Hampstead NW3	Balustrade	c. 1912	14 December 1978	TQ2598386713; 51°33′55″N 0°11′02″W	1322070	The Hill Garden Western Summerhouse
The Old Mansion and Attached Wall, Railings and Lamp Holder	94 Frognal, Frognal NW3	House	c. 1700	11 August 1950	TQ2610285708; 51°33′22″N 0°10′57″W	1113070	The Old Mansion and Attached Wall, Railings and Lamp Holder More images
The Roundhouse	Chalk Farm Road, Chalk Farm NW1	Warehouse	1860s	10 June 1954	TQ2829784302; 51°32′35″N 0°09′05″W	1258103	The Roundhouse More images
Tomb of John Constable and Family and Attached Railings in St John-at-Hampstead Churchyard	Churchyard of St John-at-Hampstead, Church Row, Hampstead NW3	Family Vault	1828	14 May 1974	TQ2623985558; 51°33′17″N 0°10′50″W	1067357	Tomb of John Constable and Family and Attached Railings in St John-at-Hampstead Churchyard More images
Tomb of Marthe Goscombe John and Sir William Goscombe John in Hampstead Cemetery	Camden	Gravestone	c. 1923	11 January 1999	TQ2487385604; 51°33′20″N 0°12′01″W	1322159	Tomb of Marthe Goscombe John and Sir William Goscombe John in Hampstead Cemetery
Tomb of William and John Hart and R Carey and a Cary in St Johns Churchyard	Camden	Family Vault	c. 1717	11 January 1999	TQ2621285596; 51°33′19″N 0°10′51″W	1067367	Tomb of William and John Hart and R Carey and a Cary in St Johns Churchyard More images
Voel House	18, South Grove, Highgate N6	House	Late C16/Early 17th century	10 June 1954	TQ2824587200; 51°34′09″N 0°09′04″W	1378764	Voel House
British Medical Association War Memorial	British Medical Association House, Tavistock Square WC1H	Steps	1954	15 April 1998	TQ2993182463; 51°31′34″N 0°07′42″W	1378969	British Medical Association War Memorial More images
Witanhurst	41, Highgate West Hill, Highgate N6	House	Early 18th century	16 December 1970	TQ2811787189; 51°34′08″N 0°09′10″W	1379026	Witanhurst More images
1 Elm Row	1 Elm Row, Hampstead NW3	House	1720	11 August 1950	TQ2639186057; 51°33′33″N 0°10′41″W	1078275	1 Elm Row
33, 34, and 35 Great Queen Street	Great Queen Street, Covent Garden	Terraced House	c. 1710	24 October 1951	TQ3042781263; 51°30′55″N 0°07′18″W	1113215	33, 34, and 35 Great Queen Street
27, 28, and 29 Great Queen Street	Great Queen Street, Covent Garden	Terrace	c. 1733	24 October 1951	TQ3044681292; 51°30′56″N 0°07′17″W	1113213	27, 28, and 29 Great Queen Street
60 Carey Street	Camden	House	Early 18th century	24 October 1951	TQ3106981276; 51°30′55″N 0°06′45″W	1244098	60 Carey Street More images
2–16 Duke's Road	Camden	House	1822	10 June 1954	TQ2987182550; 51°31′37″N 0°07′45″W	1342088	2–16 Duke's Road
1–12 Holly Village	Camden	Estate Cottage	1865	10 June 1954	TQ2858886501; 51°33′46″N 0°08′47″W	1379116	1–12 Holly Village More images
49 Lambs Conduit Street	Camden	House	1720	14 May 1974	TQ3062181999; 51°31′19″N 0°07′07″W	1379271	49 Lambs Conduit Street
81 Swain's Lane	81 Swain's Lane, Highgate N6	House	1967–1969	10 August 2009	TQ2854586925; 51°34′00″N 0°08′48″W	1393411	81 Swain's Lane More images
1, 2, and 3 Willow Road	Camden	Terrace Houses	1938	14 May 1974	TQ2701985841; 51°33′26″N 0°10′09″W	1379196	1, 2, and 3 Willow Road More images
66 Frognal	Camden	House	1937–1938	1 August 1973	TQ2610385548; 51°33′17″N 0°10′57″W	1113062	66 Frognal More images
2 and 4 Redington Road	2 and 4 Redington Road, Hampstead NW3	Semi Detached House	1876	25 January 1963	TQ2601085712; 51°33′22″N 0°11′02″W	1245497	2 and 4 Redington Road
57 and 58 Lincoln Inns Field	Camden	House	c. 1730	24 October 1951	TQ3065781323; 51°30′57″N 0°07′06″W	1379332	57 and 58 Lincoln Inns Field More images
65 Lincolns Inn Fields	Camden	House	1772	24 October 1951	TQ3062281385; 51°30′59″N 0°07′08″W	1379335	65 Lincolns Inn Fields More images
4–18 and 4a–18a Woburn Walk	Camden	Terrace House	1822	10 June 1954	TQ2988882520; 51°31′36″N 0°07′45″W	1379210	4–18 and 4a–18a Woburn Walk
1–9 and 1a–9a Woburn Walk	1–9 and 1a–9a Woburn Walk, WC1H	Terrace House	1822	10 June 1954	TQ2987082530; 51°31′36″N 0°07′45″W	1379209	1–9 and 1a–9a Woburn Walk
Hopkins House	49a Downshire Hill, Hampstead NW3	House	1976	4 June 2018	TQ2692085622; 51°33′19″N 0°10′14″W	1444039	Hopkins House More images

== See also ==
- Grade I listed buildings in Camden
