= Grade I listed buildings in the London Borough of Camden =

There are over 9,000 Grade I listed buildings in England. This page is a list of these buildings in the London Borough of Camden.

== List of buildings ==
Name	Location	Type	Completed (Note: The date given is the date used by Historic England as significant for the initial building or that of an important part in the structure's description.)	Date designated	Grid ref. (Note: The grid reference is based on the British national grid reference system, sometimes known as OSGB36, used by the Ordnance Survey.) Geo-coordinates	Entry number (Note: The "List Entry Number" is a unique number assigned to each listed building and scheduled monument by Historic England.)	Image
All Saints Greek Orthodox Church	Camden Street, Camden Town; NW1 0JA	Church	1822–24	10 June 1954	TQ2924683849; 51°32′20″N 0°08′16″W	1244162	All Saints Greek Orthodox Church More images
Burgh House	New End Square, Hampstead; NW3 1LT	House; includes Hampstead Museum	c. 1703–1704	11 August 1950	TQ2660685947; 51°33′30″N 0°10′30″W	1113163	Burgh House More images
Charles Dickens House and attached railings	48 Doughty Street, Bloomsbury; WC1N 2LX	Terraced house	c. 1807–1809	10 June 1954	TQ3078082201; 51°31′25″N 0°06′59″W	1356735	Charles Dickens House and attached railings More images
Church of Christ the King and attached railings and walls	Gordon Square, Bloomsbury; WC1H 0AG	Church	1851–54	10 June 1954	TQ2972182159; 51°31′24″N 0°07′54″W	1113038	Church of Christ the King and attached railings and walls More images
Church of St George and attached railings, gates and lamps	Bloomsbury Way, Bloomsbury; WC1A 2SA	Church	1716–31	24 October 1951	TQ3020981536; 51°31′04″N 0°07′29″W	1272341	Church of St George and attached railings, gates and lamps More images
Church of St Giles in the Fields	St Giles High Street, Covent Garden; WC2H 8LG	Church	1731–33	24 October 1951	TQ2996381260; 51°30′55″N 0°07′42″W	1245864	Church of St Giles in the Fields More images
Church of St John	Downshire Hill, Hampstead; NW3 1NU	Church	1818–23	11 August 1950	TQ2698285697; 51°33′21″N 0°10′11″W	1078270	Church of St John More images
Church of St John	Church Row, Hampstead; NW3 6UU	Church	1747–52	11 August 1950	TQ2619085615; 51°33′19″N 0°10′52″W	1271918	Church of St John More images
Church of St Martin	Vicars Road, Gospel Oak; NW5 4NL	Church	1864–66	10 June 1954	TQ2816285282; 51°33′07″N 0°09′10″W	1379098	Church of St Martin More images
Church of St Pancras	Upper Woburn Place, St Pancras; NW1 2BA	Parish church	1819–22	10 June 1954	TQ2981782577; 51°31′38″N 0°07′48″W	1379062	Church of St Pancras More images
Church of St Stephen	Pond Street, Hampstead; NW3 2PP	Church	c. 1869–1871	14 May 1974	TQ2708785399; 51°33′11″N 0°10′06″W	1130394	Church of St Stephen More images
Fenton House	Hampstead Grove, Hampstead; NW3 6SP	Detached house	1693	11 August 1950	TQ2628586014; 51°33′32″N 0°10′47″W	1378648	Fenton House More images
Gloucester Lodge (no.12) Gloucester House (no.14) and attached boundary wall	Outer Circle, Regent's Park; NW1 4HA	Semi-detached house	1827–28	14 May 1974	TQ2858583423; 51°32′06″N 0°08′51″W	1078323	Gloucester Lodge (no.12) Gloucester House (no.14) and attached boundary wall More images
Institute of St Marcellina	Ellerdale Road, Hampstead; NW3 6BD	House	1874–76	11 August 1950	TQ2632785528; 51°33′16″N 0°10′45″W	1078274	Institute of St Marcellina More images
Keats House	10 Keats Grove, Hampstead; NW3 2RR	House	1838–39	11 August 1950	TQ2710885666; 51°33′20″N 0°10′05″W	1379221	Keats House More images
Kenwood House (Iveagh Bequest)	Hampstead Lane, Hampstead; NW3 7JR	Villa	c. 1767–1768	10 June 1954	TQ2708587418; 51°34′17″N 0°10′04″W	1379242	Kenwood House (Iveagh Bequest) More images
King's Cross Station	Euston Road at York Way, Pentonville; N1C 4AL	Railway station	1850–52	10 June 1954	TQ3026983130; 51°31′55″N 0°07′24″W	1078328	King's Cross Station More images
Lindsey House and attached railings, piers and lamp brackets	59–60 Lincoln's Inn Fields, Holborn; WC2A 3BP	House	1638–41	24 October 1951	TQ3064981338; 51°30′57″N 0°07′07″W	1379333	Lindsey House and attached railings, piers and lamp brackets More images
Numbers 1–10 Bedford Square and attached railings	Bedford Square, Bloomsbury; WC1B 3RA	House	1880	24 October 1951	TQ2991781702; 51°31′09″N 0°07′44″W	1272304	Numbers 1–10 Bedford Square and attached railings More images
Number 11 Bedford Square and attached railings	Bedford Square, Bloomsbury; WC1B 3RA	Terraced house	1776–81	24 October 1951	TQ2987681766; 51°31′12″N 0°07′46″W	1272315	Number 11 Bedford Square and attached railings More images
Numbers 12–27 Bedford Square and attached railings	Bedford Square, Bloomsbury; WC1B 3RA	House	1776–81	24 October 1951	TQ2979181708; 51°31′10″N 0°07′51″W	1244546	Numbers 12–27 Bedford Square and attached railings More images
Numbers 28–38 Bedford Square and attached railings	Bedford Square, Bloomsbury; WC1B 3RA	House	18th century	24 October 1951	TQ2977781604; 51°31′06″N 0°07′52″W	1244548	Numbers 28–38 Bedford Square and attached railings More images
Numbers 40–54 Bedford Square and attached railings	Bedford Square, Bloomsbury; WC1B 3RA	Terrace	1776–81	24 October 1951	TQ2987781608; 51°31′06″N 0°07′46″W	1244553	Numbers 40–54 Bedford Square and attached railings More images
Numbers 1, 1a and 2–8 Fitzroy Square and attached railings and lamp holders	Fitzroy Square, Fitzrovia; W1T 5HF	House	c. 1792–1794	10 June 1954	TQ2917382127; 51°31′24″N 0°08′22″W	1112991	Numbers 1, 1a and 2–8 Fitzroy Square and attached railings and lamp holders More images
Numbers 1, 2 and 3 Albany Terrace and attached railings	off Marylebone Road, Regent's Park; NW1 4DS	Terrace	c. 1823–1825	14 May 1974	TQ2879082229; 51°31′27″N 0°08′42″W	1113116	Numbers 1, 2 and 3 Albany Terrace and attached railings More images
Numbers 1–10 Cambridge Terrace and attached railings	off Outer Circle East, Regent's Park; NW1 4DS	House	1825	14 May 1974	TQ2875782557; 51°31′38″N 0°08′43″W	1244296	Numbers 1–10 Cambridge Terrace and attached railings More images
Numbers 1–12 Chester Place and attached railings	Chester Place, Regent's Park; NW1 4NB	Terrace	c. 1826	10 June 1954	TQ2876382945; 51°31′51″N 0°08′42″W	1242936	Numbers 1–12 Chester Place and attached railings More images
Numbers 12 and 13 New Square and attached railings	Lincoln's Inn, Holborn; WC2A 3LJ	Terraced house	1534	24 October 1951	TQ3101081368; 51°30′58″N 0°06′48″W	1379305	Numbers 12 and 13 New Square and attached railings More images
Numbers 13–24 Park Square East and attached railings, the Diorama, Bedford College Annexe	Park Square, Regent's Park; NW1 4LH	Apartment	c. 1823–1825	14 May 1974	TQ2876982273; 51°31′29″N 0°08′43″W	1322054	Numbers 13–24 Park Square East and attached railings, the Diorama, Bedford College Annexe More images
Numbers 1–4 Cumberland Place and attached balustrades and railings	Outer Circle East, Regent's Park; NW1 4NA	House	c. 1828	14 May 1974	TQ2872582949; 51°31′51″N 0°08′44″W	1067384	Numbers 1–4 Cumberland Place and attached balustrades and railings More images
1–42 Chester Terrace and attached railings and linking arches	Outer Circle East, Regent's Park; NW1 4NL	Semi-detached house	c. 1825	14 May 1974	TQ2875582764; 51°31′45″N 0°08′43″W	1271885	1–42 Chester Terrace and attached railings and linking arches More images
1–59 Cumberland Terrace and attached railings	Outer Circle East, Regent's Park; NW1 4HS	Manor house	c. 1827	14 May 1974	TQ2868883102; 51°31′56″N 0°08′46″W	1067386	1–59 Cumberland Terrace and attached railings More images
Numbers 1–7 and attached railings and lamp holder	Lincoln's Inn Fields, Holborn; WC2A 3BP	House	1775–1845	24 October 1951	TQ3094681527; 51°31′03″N 0°06′51″W	1379318	Numbers 1–7 and attached railings and lamp holder More images
Numbers 1–8 St Andrews Place and attached railings	Outer Circle East, Regent's Park; NW1 4LB	Terrace	c. 1823	14 May 1974	TQ2877682328; 51°31′31″N 0°08′42″W	1246155	Numbers 1–8 St Andrews Place and attached railings More images
Numbers 2 to 11 Gloucester Gate and attached railings	Outer Circle, Regent's Park; NW1 4HG	Terrace	c. 1827	14 May 1974	TQ2860083368; 51°32′04″N 0°08′50″W	1078322	Numbers 2 to 11 Gloucester Gate and attached railings More images
Numbers 31 and 33 Albany Street and attached railings	Albany Street, Regent's Park; NW1 4BU	Terraced house	1826	6 March 1973	TQ2882282362; 51°31′32″N 0°08′40″W	1378597	Numbers 31 and 33 Albany Street and attached railings More images
Numbers 8–11 Chancery Lane and attached railings and gates	Chancery Lane, Holborn; WC2A 1AF	Terrace	1775–80	24 October 1951	TQ3098781531; 51°31′03″N 0°06′49″W	1379319	Numbers 8–11 Chancery Lane and attached railings and gates More images
Numbers 1, 1a, 1b, 1c and 1d and 2–32 Isokon building	Lawn Road, Hampstead; NW3 2XD	Kitchen	1933–34	14 May 1974	TQ2751985275; 51°33′07″N 0°09′44″W	1379280	Numbers 1, 1a, 1b, 1c and 1d and 2–32 Isokon building More images
Lincoln's Inn Old Hall and attached gateway	Lincoln's Inn, Holborn; WC2A 3TN	Banqueting house	1489–92	24 October 1951	TQ3103081395; 51°30′59″N 0°06′47″W	1379316	Lincoln's Inn Old Hall and attached gateway More images
St Etheldreda's Roman Catholic Church and Attached Walls and Piers	14 Ely Place, Holborn; EC1N 6RY	Gate pier	c. 1300	24 October 1951	TQ3141181673; 51°31′07″N 0°06′27″W	1078287	St Etheldreda's Roman Catholic Church and Attached Walls and Piers More images
Romney's House	5 Holly Bush Hill, Hampstead; NW3 6SH	Terraced house	1797	11 August 1950	TQ2630685916; 51°33′29″N 0°10′46″W	1379069	Romney's House More images
Royal College of Physicians	St Andrews Place, Outer Circle; Regent's Park; NW1 4LB	Library	1960–64	24 April 1998	TQ2878382390; 51°31′33″N 0°08′42″W	1246159	Royal College of Physicians More images
Sir John Soane Museum and Attached Railings	13 Lincoln's Inn Fields, Holborn; Wc2A 3BP	Terrace	c. 1824	24 October 1951	TQ3072081472; 51°31′01″N 0°07′03″W	1379327	Sir John Soane Museum and Attached Railings More images
St Pancras Station and Former Midland Grand Hotel	Euston Road, Somers Town; N1C 4QL	Gate	1865–69	7 November 1967	TQ3010782977; 51°31′51″N 0°07′33″W	1342037	St Pancras Station and Former Midland Grand Hotel More images
The British Library, piazza, boundary wall and railings to Ossulston Street, Euston Road and Midland Road	96 Euston Rd, Somers Town; NW1 2DB	Library	1982–99	31 July 2015	TQ2997082897; 51°31′48″N 0°07′40″W	1426345	The British Library, piazza, boundary wall and railings to Ossulston Street, Euston Road and Midland Road More images
The British Museum	Great Russell Street, Bloomsbury; WC1B 3DG	Museum	1823–26	24 October 1951	TQ3005481721; 51°31′10″N 0°07′37″W	1130404	The British Museum More images
The British Museum King Edward VII Galleries and Attached Wall and Lions	Great Russell Street, Bloomsbury; WC1B 3DG	Boundary wall	1905–14	24 October 1951	TQ2999181801; 51°31′13″N 0°07′40″W	1322129	The British Museum King Edward VII Galleries and Attached Wall and Lions More images
The Chapel	Lincoln's Inn, Holborn; WC2A 3AA	Chapel	1619–23	24 October 1951	TQ3102781425; 51°31′00″N 0°06′47″W	1379317	The Chapel More images
The Egyptian Avenue and Lebanon Circle (Inner and Outer Circles), Highgate Cemetery	Swain's Lane, Highgate; N6 6PJ	Catacomb (funerary)	c. 1838–1839	14 May 1974	TQ2834887135; 51°34′07″N 0°08′58″W	1271935	The Egyptian Avenue and Lebanon Circle (Inner and Outer Circles), Highgate Cemetery More images
The London Foot Hospital and Attached Railings	33 Fitzroy Square, Fitzrovia; W1P 6AY	Terrace	c. 1792–1794	10 June 1954	TQ2916582041; 51°31′21″N 0°08′23″W	1112997	The London Foot Hospital and Attached Railings More images
The National Institute for Social Work Training and Attached Railings and Gates	5 Tavistock Place, Bloomsbury; WC1H 9SN	Conference centre	1896–98	7 April 1960	TQ3000782361; 51°31′31″N 0°07′39″W	1378962	The National Institute for Social Work Training and Attached Railings and Gates More images
Tomb of Karl Marx and Family in Highgate (eastern) Cemetery	Swain's Lane, Highgate; N6 6PJ	Bust	1956	14 May 1974	TQ2874486891; 51°33′58″N 0°08′38″W	1378872	Tomb of Karl Marx and Family in Highgate (eastern) Cemetery More images
Tomb of Sir John Soane, His Wife and Son in St Pancras Old Church Gardens	St Pancras Old Church Gardens; Pancras Road; Camden Town; NW1 1UL	Family vault	1816	16 May 1978	TQ2979383504; 51°32′08″N 0°07′48″W	1322044	Tomb of Sir John Soane, His Wife and Son in St Pancras Old Church Gardens More images
University College (University of London) and Attached Railings to North and South Wings	University College London, Gower Street; Bloomsbury; WC1E 6BT	Gate pier	c. 1848	10 June 1954	TQ2958282298; 51°31′29″N 0°08′01″W	1113056	University College (University of London) and Attached Railings to North and South Wings More images
16–23 Old Buildings	Lincoln's Inn Fields, Holborn; WC2A 3BP	Kitchen	c. 1524	24 October 1951	TQ3104181371; 51°30′58″N 0°06′46″W	1379311	16–23 Old Buildings More images
9 and 10 St Andrews Place	St Andrews Place; Outer Circle East; Regent's Park; NW1 4LB	Terraced house	c. 1826	14 May 1974	TQ2881582360; 51°31′32″N 0°08′40″W	1246157	9 and 10 St Andrews Place More images

== See also ==
- Grade II* listed buildings in Camden
