= Edward Middleton Barry =

English architect

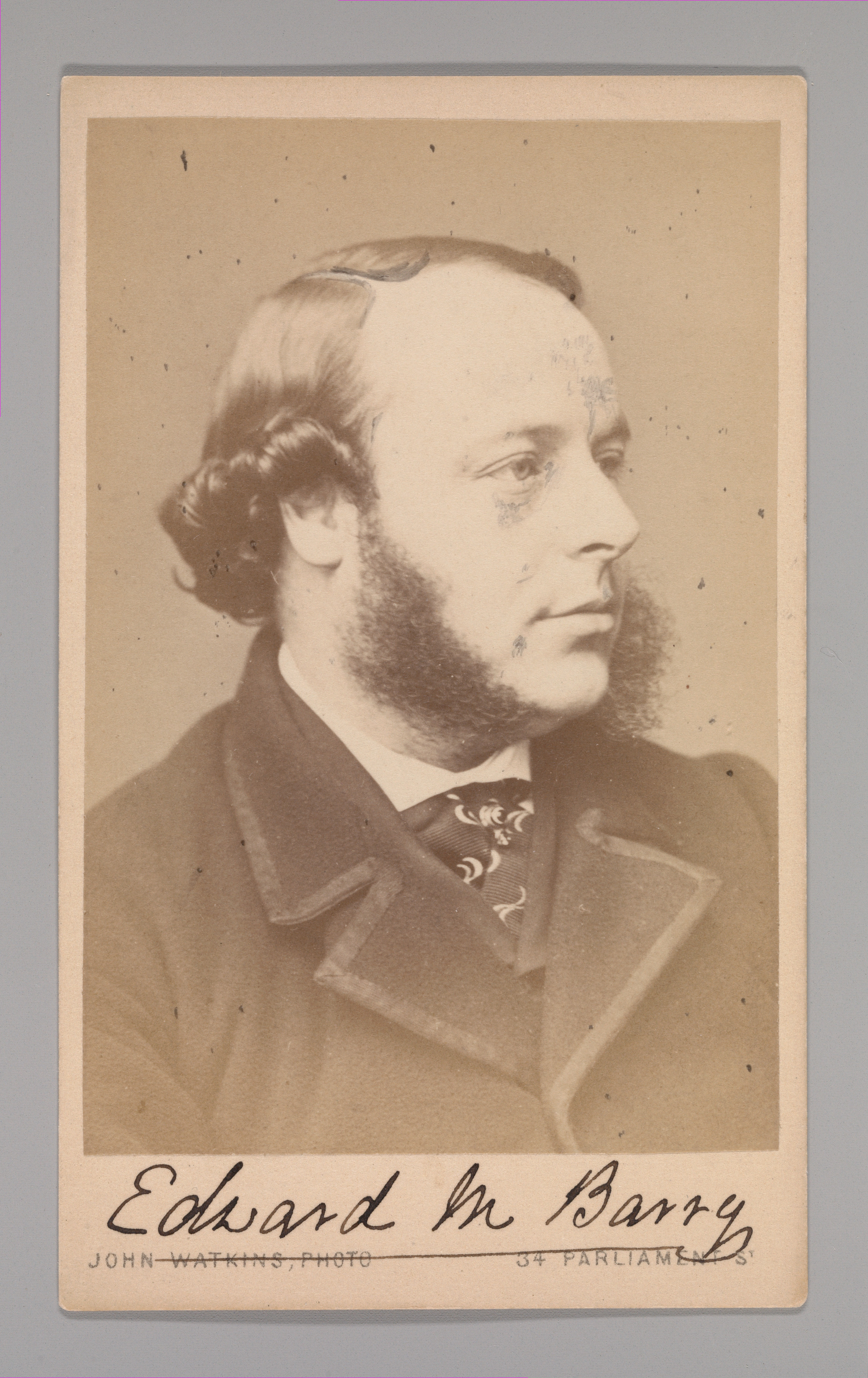
- Born: 7 June 1830; London, United Kingdom of Great Britain and Ireland
- Died: 27 January 1880 (aged 49); London, United Kingdom of Great Britain and Ireland
- Education: King's College London
- Occupation: Architect
- Buildings: Royal Opera House (London); Royal Opera House (Valletta); St Dunstan's College

Edward Middleton Barry RA (7 June 1830 – 27 January 1880) was an English architect of the 19th century.

== Biography ==
Edward Barry was the third son of Sir Charles Barry, born in his father's house, 27 Foley Place, London. In infancy he was delicate, and was placed under the care of a confidential servant at Blackheath. At an early age he was sent to school in that neighbourhood, and then to a private school at Walthamstow, where he remained until he became a student at King's College London.

He was apprenticed to Thomas Henry Wyatt for a short time, after which he joined his father's practice. He continued to assist his father until the latter's sudden death in 1860, but he had already made considerable progress in working on his own account. In 1848 he had become a student at the Royal Academy, and even while assisting his father found time to devote to works of his own. The first of these was St. Saviour's Church, Haverstock Hill, in 1855–56. His designs for St. Giles's schools, Endell Street, which were carried out under his own superintendence in 1859–60, gave him a recognised position. It was to the originality displayed in these works that he owed his admission, in 1861, as an associate to the Royal Academy.

The reconstruction, in 1857, in the short space of eight months, of the theatre at Covent Garden, which had been destroyed by fire, and the erection in the following year of the Floral Hall adjoining, afford examples of his energy, constructive skill, and artistic ability. These works were executed for his own private clients, and without diminishing the assistance which he was then rendering to his father. In 1860 Sir Charles Barry died suddenly, and upon Edward devolved the duty of completing his father's works. Foremost of these was the new Palace of Westminster, which was at length entrusted to him by the government; and Halifax Town Hall.

On 29 March 1862 he married Lucy, daughter of Thomas Kettlewell. The remaining years of his life record a long series of works designed by him, many of them of national magnitude and importance. In 1869 he was elected an academician, and in 1873, on the retirement of Sir George Gilbert Scott, and then again in 1878 he was elected professorship of architecture in the Royal Academy. In 1874, on the resignation of Sydney Smirke, he was appointed treasurer of the academy.

== Significant contributions ==
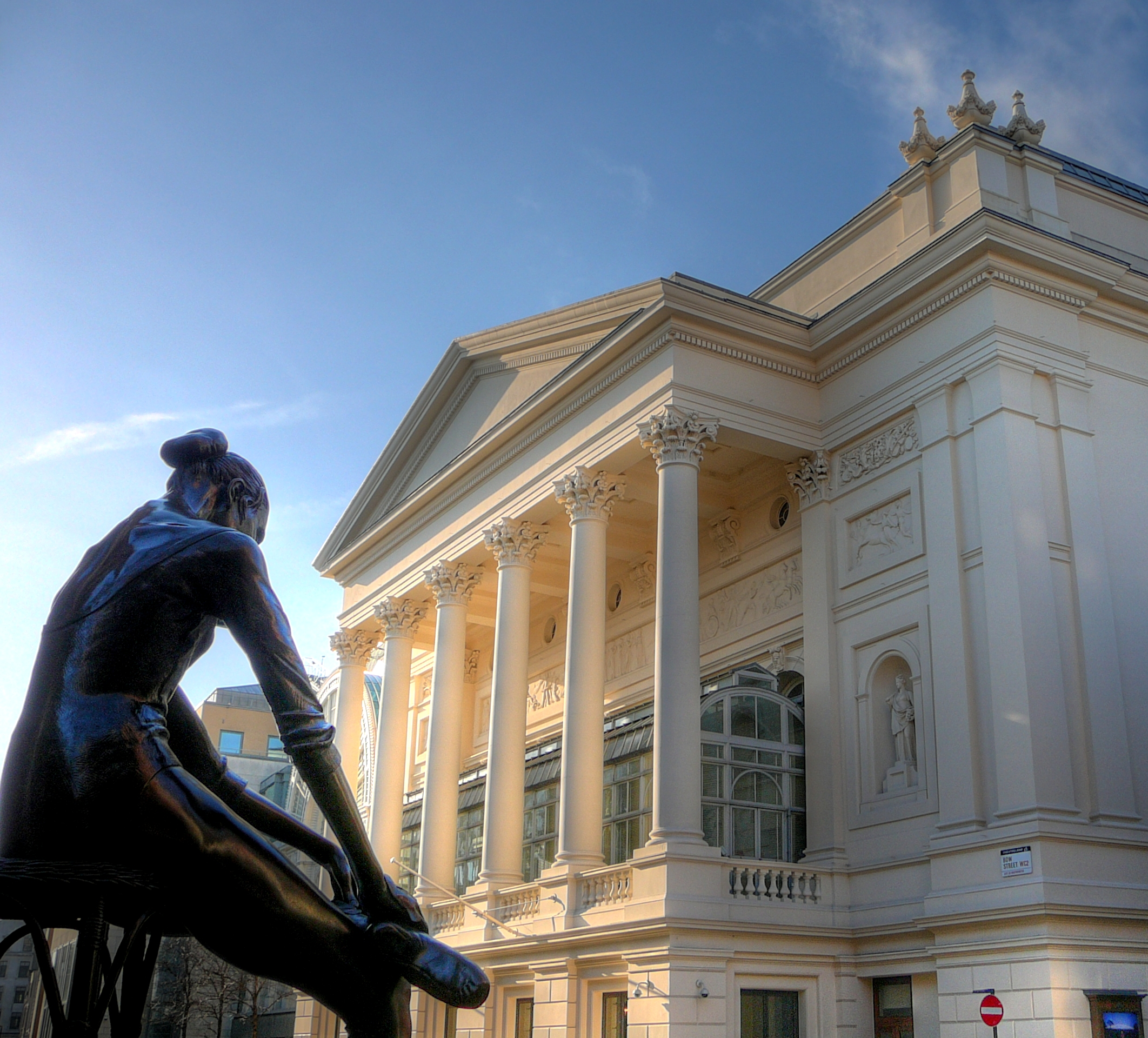
The Royal Opera House, Bow Street frontage with Plazzotta's statue, Young Dancer, in the foreground

Among his most significant contributions to London's architectural scene is the Theatre of the Royal Opera House in Covent Garden. The previous theatre (built by Robert Smirke in 1809) was destroyed in a fire in 1857. Edward Barry was commissioned to design the new "Royal Italian Opera" as it was then known, completing it for its official opening on 15 May 1858. He also designed the adjacent Floral Hall, a glass and cast iron structure heavily influenced by the Crystal Palace built for the Great Exhibition of 1851. The Covent Garden work was hugely influential in Barry's appointment to design the Royal Opera House in Valletta, Malta (1866), bombed by the Luftwaffe during the Second World War. Barry often favoured a very classical style.

== Other projects ==
- St Saviour's Church Hampstead, London (1856)
- Birmingham and Midland Institute (1855, this later became Birmingham Reference Library but was demolished in the 1960s)
- Leeds Grammar School (1857 – now part of the University of Leeds' Business School)
- Henham Hall, Suffolk; tomb of Alexander Berens in West Norwood cemetery (1858) (photograph in the gallery of West Norwood Cemetery)
- Duxbury Hall, Lancashire (1859)
- St. Giles's Schools, Endell Street (1860)
- Burnley Grammar School (1860)
- Gawthorpe Hall, Lancashire (additions) (1861)
- Birmingham Free Public Library (1861)
- Pyrgo Park, Romford (additions) (1862)
- Stabling at Millbank for the Speaker (1862)
- Halifax Town Hall, West Yorkshire (designed by Charles Barry, 1860; completed by E.M. Barry, 1863)
- Barbon Park Lodge, Westmorland (1863)
- Royal Opera House, Valletta, Malta (1864)
- the Star and Garter Hotel, Richmond Hill, London (additions) (1865)
- Schools, Canford, Dorset (1865)
- Charing Cross Hotel and the nearby Queen Eleanor Memorial Cross (a Victorian replica erected in 1863 by the London, Chatham and Dover Railway Company – the original cross was erected by King Edward I in 1291, but removed in 1647), London (1865)
- Cannon Street Hotel (1866)
- St Dunstan's College (1867)
- rebuilding and extension of Crewe Hall, near Crewe, Cheshire (1866–70)
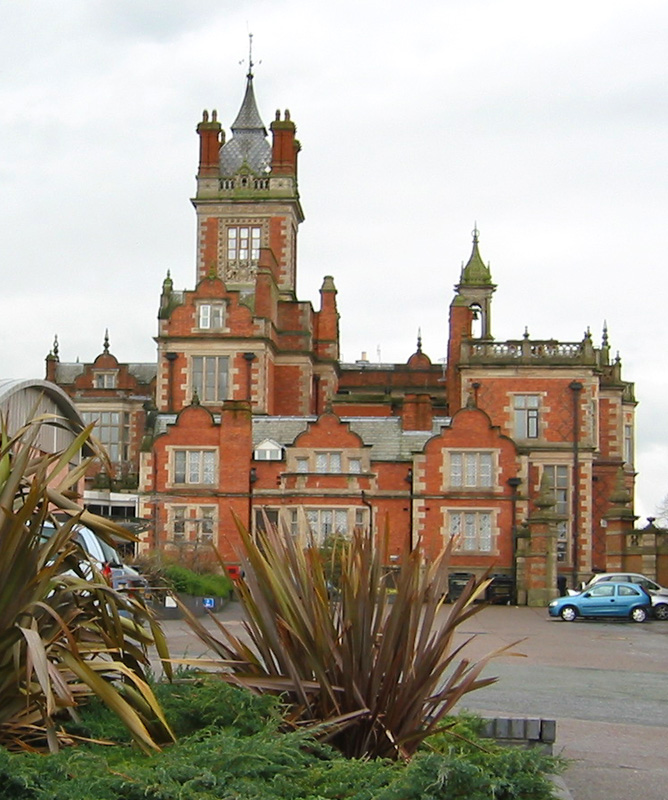
  Crewe Hall, west face, showing Barry's tower and Bower's extension
- Bakeham House, Egham (1868)
- Esher Lodge (additions) (1870)
- rebuilding of Crowcombe Court, Somerset (1870)
- Palace of Westminster (his supervision of his father's work was finally completed in 1870; the only substantial element for which Edward was entirely responsible was the colonnade on New Palace Yard and the striking railings around the Yard, but included work on the Queen's Robing Room, Royal Staircase and the decoration of the Central Octagon Hall)
- Thorpe Abbotts, Norfolk (additions) (1871)
- Sudbury Hall, Derbyshire (additions) (1872)
- Wykehurst Place, near Bolney, West Sussex (1872), for Henry Huth
- The Exchange, Bristol (1872)
- Cobham Park, Cobham, Surrey (1873)
- Shabden, Surrey (1873)
- the East Range of Downing College, Cambridge (1873)
- St Anne's Church, Clifton, near Eccles, Salford (1874)
- Peterborough Cathedral, pulpit (1874)
- The Hospital For Sick Children, (Great Ormond Street Hospital), London (1872 – now demolished, though his St Christopher's Chapel (1875) survives)
- London and Westminster Bank, Temple Bar (additions and alterations) (1873)
- Entrance to Fitzwilliam Museum, Cambridge (1875)
- Doric temple mausoleum to Eustratios Ralli, West Norwood Cemetery listed Grade II (1875)
- Royal Infirmary, Waterloo Road (alterations) (1875)
- new galleries ('The Barry Rooms') and dome for the National Gallery, London; remodelling the top of Burlington House's central staircase (1876)
- Peakirk Church, Hermitage (restored) (1879)
- Stancliffe Hall, Derbyshire (additions, &c.) (1879)
- House for Art Union, Strand (1879)

== Final works ==
Towards the end of his life, Barry began working with his eldest brother, Charles Barry, Jr. Among the projects jointly attributed to them are Temple Gardens chambers at Inner Temple, London (completed in 1879), and the design of the Great Eastern Hotel at London's Liverpool Street station, completed in 1884, after Edward's death.
