= Princess Louise, Holborn =

Listed pub in London, England

Princess Louise
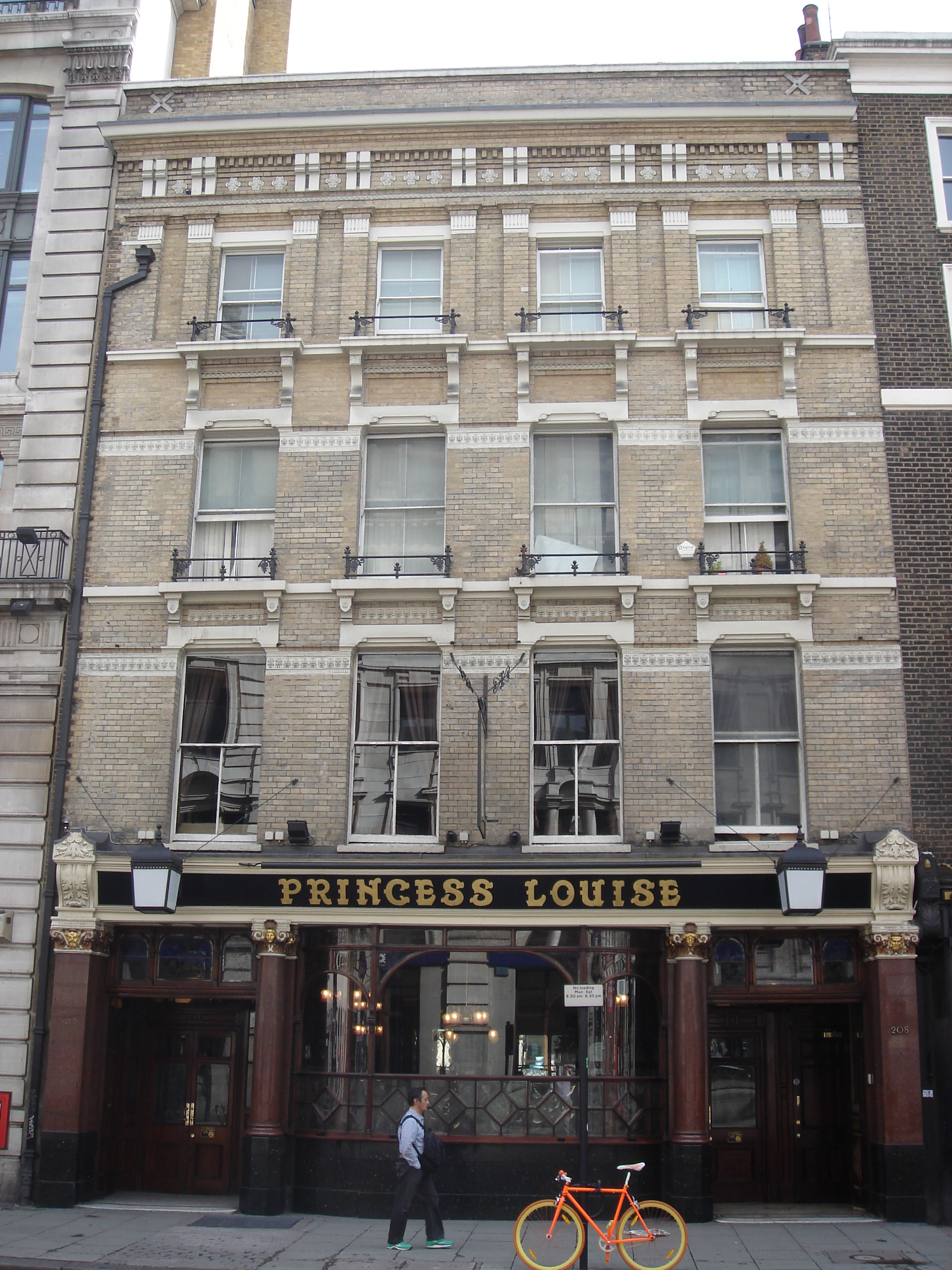
- The pub in 2013

General information
- Type: Public house
- Location: 208 High Holborn, Holborn, London, England
- Coordinates: 51°31′02.5″N 0°07′17.5″W
- Year built: Mid-19th century
- Renovated: 1891 (remodelled); 2008 (refurbished)
- Owner: Womble Bond Dickinson (Trust Corporation) Ltd

Design and construction
- Designations

Listed Building – Grade II*
- Official name: Princess Louise public house
- Designated: 15 January 1973
- Reference no.: 1378884

Renovating team
- Architect: Arthur Chitty (1891)

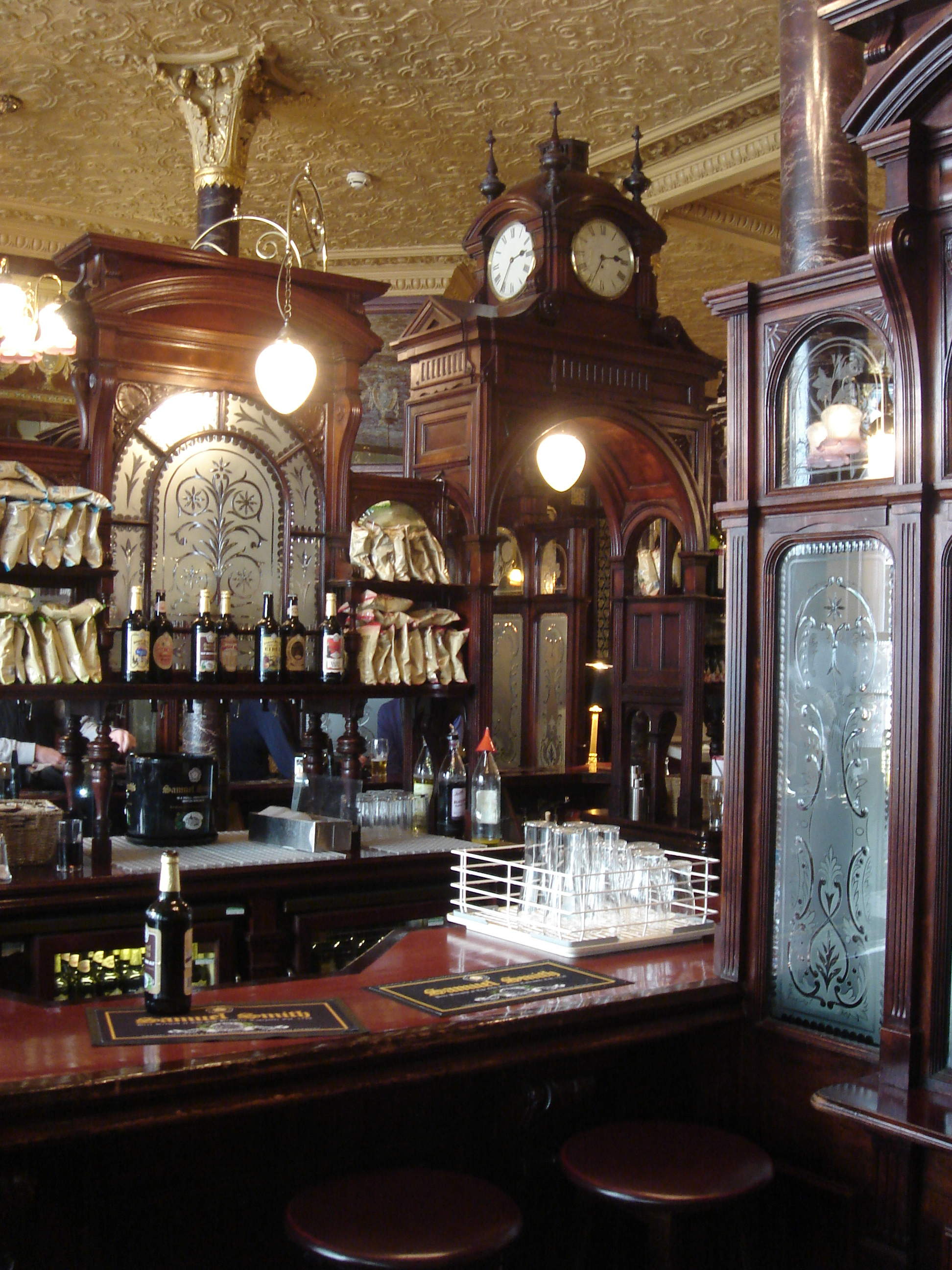
The interior in 2013

The Princess Louise is a Grade II* listed public house on High Holborn in London, England. Built in the mid-19th century and extensively remodelled in 1891 to designs by Arthur Chitty for W. B. Simpson & Sons, it is noted for its well-preserved Victorian interior. The pub is included on the Campaign for Real Ale (CAMRA)'s National Inventory of Historic Pub Interiors, where its interior is rated as being of "outstanding national historic importance".

== History ==
The building is a mid-19th-century public house whose interior was comprehensively remodelled in 1891 to designs by Arthur Chitty and under the direction of W. B. Simpson & Sons.

Owing to its proximity to Bloomsbury, the British Museum and the University of London, the pub has been noted as a meeting place for academics. The Princess Louise has been the venue for a number of influential folk clubs run by Ewan MacColl and others, which played an important part in the British folk revival of the late 1950s and early 1960s.

On 15 January 1973, the Princess Louise was designated a Grade II* listed building. It was included on the Campaign for Real Ale (CAMRA)'s National Inventory of Historic Pub Interiors before the inventory's grading system was revised. Under the revised scheme, it is rated three stars and its interior is regarded as being "of outstanding national historic importance".

In 2008, Samuel Smith's carried out a refurbishment that reinstated screens, snugs and separate bar areas, restoring much of the historic layout. In June 2009, the pub was joint winner of the best refurbishment class of the 2008 Pub Design Awards awarded annually by the Campaign for Real Ale (CAMRA). Author Peter Haydon included the Princess Louise in his book The Best Pubs in London and rated it No. 5 in the capital, saying it had "possibly the best preserved Victorian pub interior in London".

The pub was formerly owned by Samuel Smith's. As of January 2026, the freehold was held by Womble Bond Dickinson (Trust Corporation) Ltd and the premises were leased by Samuel Smith's.

== Architecture ==
=== Exterior ===
The building is constructed of yellow brick with stone and terracotta detailing. It rises to four storeys and has a symmetrical front of four window bays. At ground-floor level, the frontage is framed by polished stone supports and decorative pilasters, with a projecting central window and entrances on either side. The upper floors contain regularly spaced sash windows with ornamental stone surrounds and decorative metal guards. A decorative band runs below the roofline, which is finished with a parapet.

=== Interior ===
The interior retains a largely intact late-Victorian pub layout, comprising seven drinking compartments arranged around a central U-shaped island bar and separated by mahogany screens with decorative etched-glass panels. The pub is unusual in that it retains its snob screens. Historic features include extensive polychrome tilework by W. B. Simpson & Sons, gold-embossed and etched glass by R. Morris & Son, stained glass, mosaic floors, and original mahogany bar fittings and island bar-backs by W. H. Lascelles & Co., including a four-sided clock. Four cast-iron Corinthian columns support a richly decorated ceiling with moulded cornices and a polychrome tile frieze decorated with urns and swags. An elaborate wrought-iron staircase connects the ground and first floors, while stained-glass panels depicting 'Music', 'Drama' and 'Painting' survive in the rear sections of the pub. The first-floor bar retains historic decorative features including Victorian tiling and an Art Nouveau-style dado. The basement contains a gentlemen's lavatory with marble urinals, tiled walls and other historic fittings.

== See also ==
- Grade II* listed buildings in the London Borough of Camden
