= Cloth Hill =

House in London, England

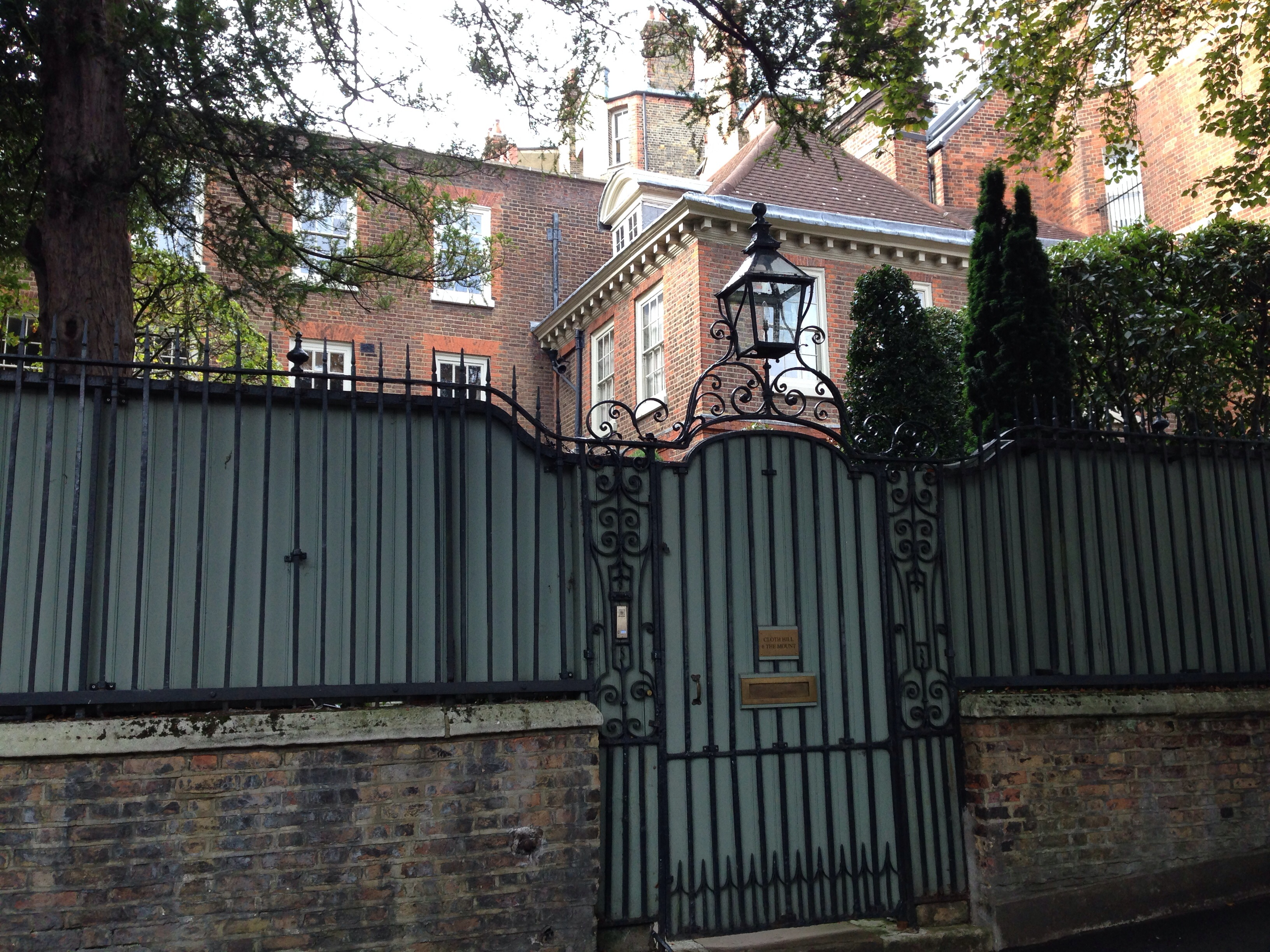
- The house in 2016

- Location within Greater London

General information
- Location: The Mount, Hampstead, London, England
- Coordinates: 51°33′30″N 0°10′45″W
- Year built: c. 1694

Listed Building – Grade II*
- Official name: Cloth Hill
- Designated: 11 August 1950
- Reference no.: 1378993

Cloth Hill is a 17th-century house on The Mount in Hampstead, north London, England.

Built around 1694 as two houses, it was later combined into a single residence. It is believed to be the second-oldest house in Hampstead after Fenton House. William Beech, a Quaker cloth merchant, lived there shortly after its completion, and Voltaire visited Beech's son-in-law, Andrew Pitt, at the property in 1728. The house was divided again in 1801. In the late 19th century one half was occupied by The Mount School, while the other was the home of publisher Edward Bell. The entrance gate is depicted in Ford Madox Brown's 1865 painting Work, where a sign advertises the property as a "genteel family residence".

The central block dates from 1694, with the northern wing dating from the early 17th century. The 1998 London North volume of the Pevsner Architectural Guides describes Cloth Hill as a "fine mansion". It has been listed at Grade II* on the National Heritage List for England since August 1950.

In 1993 it was offered for sale for under £1 million, and in 2025 it was marketed for £18 million by Savills and Marcus Parfitt. Writing in Country Life, Carla Passino noted that the property's value had risen more than ninefold beyond what would ordinarily be expected from inflation. The house had only three owners in the 140 years preceding 2025.

== See also ==
- Grade II* listed buildings in the London Borough of Camden
