= British Medical Association War Memorial =

War memorial in London

- United Kingdom
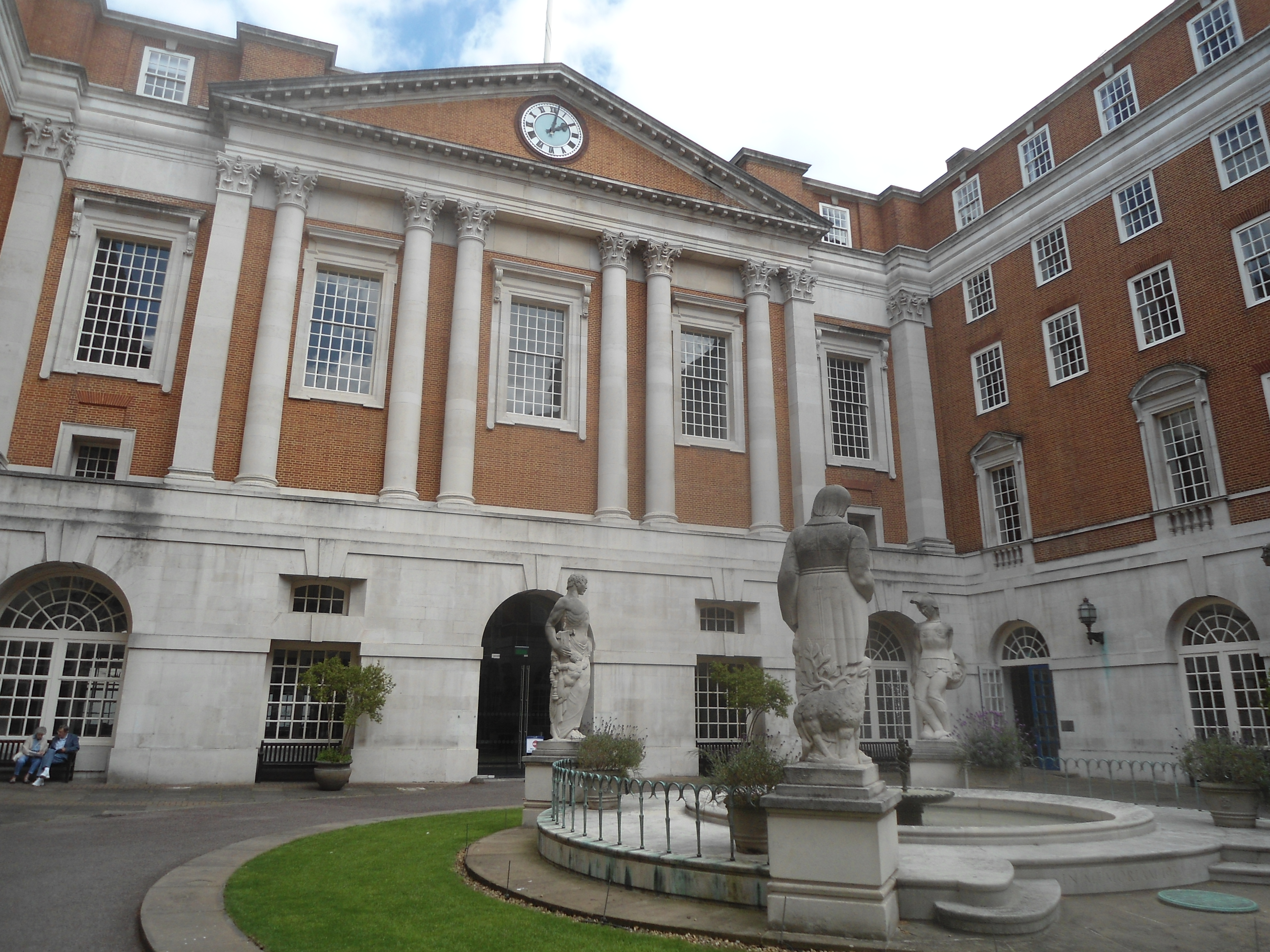
- For medical men and women from the British Empire and Commonwealth in the Second World War
- Unveiled: 1954
- Location: 51.5261°N 0.1284°W; Tavistock Square, Bloomsbury, London
- Designed by: James Woodford
- IN HONOUR OF THE MEDICAL MEN AND WOMEN OF THE BRITISH EMPIRE AND COMMONWEALTH OF NATIONS WHO GAVE THEIR LIVES IN THE SECOND WORLD WAR

Listed Building – Grade II*
- Official name: War Memorial at British Medical Association House
- Designated: 15 April 1988
- Reference no.: 1378969

The British Medical Association War Memorial, officially the War Memorial at British Medical Association House, Tavistock Square, Bloomsbury, London, commemorates men and women of the medical professions from the British Empire and Commonwealth who died in the Second World War. The memorial was commissioned by the British Medical Association and designed by the sculptor James Woodford. Unveiled in 1954 by Sir John McNee, then President of the BMA, and dedicated by Geoffrey Fisher, the Archbishop of Canterbury, it became a Grade II* listed structure in 1998.

== Site ==
Tavistock Square was first developed in 1806 by James Burton for Francis Russell, 5th Duke of Bedford, as part of the latter's development of his Bedford Estate. Thomas Cubitt continued the construction of the western half of the square in 1825–26, following – though improving on – Burton's general design for the eastern frontages. (Note: John Summerson notes that, although the "layout on which [the] houses were built was a revised version of Burton's, the houses themselves made Burton's look like jerry-building".) The design for Cubitt's western façade (nos. 29–45) was undertaken by Lewis Vulliamy. The site of the present BMA House was originally the location of Tavistock House, whose residents had included Charles Dickens and, later, the singer Georgina Weldon. (Note: Dickens is commemorated by a blue plaque which records his living there between 1851 and 1860.)

Tavistock House was demolished in the early 20th century and from 1911, was replaced by the current building designed by Edwin Lutyens as the British headquarters of the Theosophical Society. (Note: Lutyens's wife, Lady Emily, had been an ardent Theosophist since meeting the Society's President, Annie Besant, in 1910.) The building was commandeered by the War Office during the First World War and by the 1920s, when it was returned to the Theosophists, the Society lacked the funds necessary for completion. (Note: The commission had been a professional and personal disaster for Lutyens: costs had escalated from £50,000 to £110,00, he had highly acrimonious rows with Mrs Besant and her staff, and it deepened the rift between himself and his wife.) The unfinished building was sold to the BMA in 1923, which at first re-engaged Lutyens, and subsequently employed Cyril Wontner-Smith, to complete it. The BMA transferred its headquarters to the new building in 1925, having previously been based at 429 The Strand. The new BMA House became a Grade II listed building in 1982.

== History and description ==
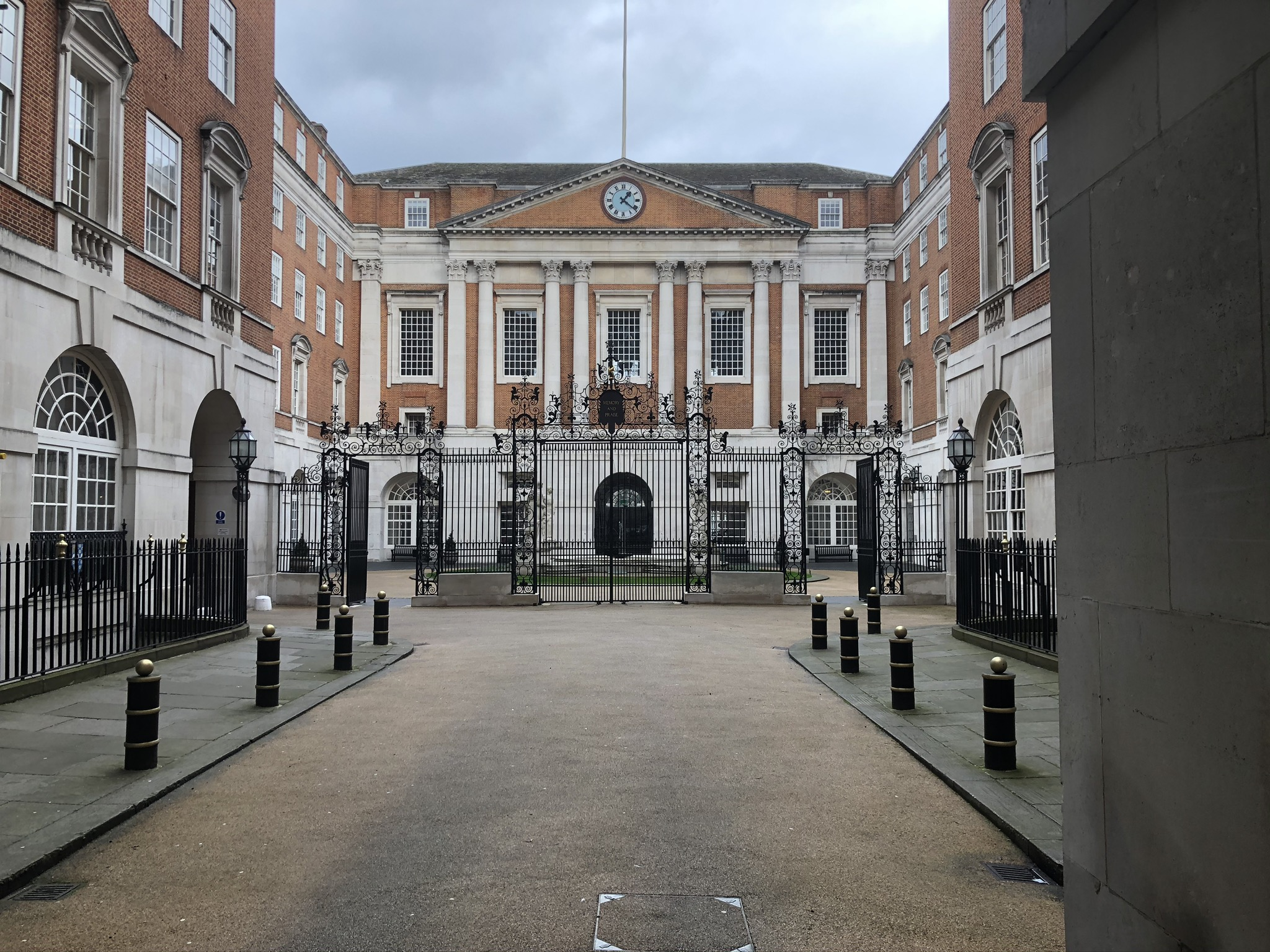
Memorial screen at BMA House, Tavistock Square, London

The British and Commonwealth medical dead of World War I are commemorated by a 60 ft (18 m) wide wrought iron memorial screen with a central pair of gates and two side gates, installed between the east and west courtyards at BMA House. Over the central gate is the BMA badge, a gilded serpent of Asclepius, and a shield with bearing the words MEMORY AND PRAISE on the west side and FAITHFUL HAVE BEEN YOUR WARFARE on the east side, with a dedication to 574 medical officers killed in the war on a separate plaque nearby. The screen and gates were designed by Lutyens and made by the Birmingham Guild of Handicraft. The World War I memorial was dedicated by Randall Davidson, Archbishop of Canterbury, on 13 July 1925, the day when the BMA's new building was officially opened by King George V and Queen Mary. It is included in the Grade II listing of BMA House. The gates were restored and rededicated in 1995, and restored again in 2014.

At the end of World War II, the BMA commissioned a second memorial from the sculptor James Woodford. Woodford, who trained at the Nottingham School of Art, the Royal College of Art and the British School at Rome, had established a reputation as a designer of architectural and heraldic sculpture. The memorial comprises a bronze fountain of intertwined serpents set in a lead-lined circular pool and surrounded by four statues representing "Sacrifice", "Cure", "Prevention" and "Aspiration". The statues and the fountain are of Portland stone and the grouping has a base constructed of York stone. The side of the stone fountain surround is inscribed with the words IN MEMORIAM 1939–1945, and a bronze dedicatory plaque reads IN HONOUR OF THE MEDICAL MEN AND WOMEN OF / THE BRITISH EMPIRE AND COMMONWEALTH OF NATIONS / WHO GAVE THEIR LIVES IN THE SECOND WORLD WAR. The whole stands within the building's east courtyard, the Court of Honour. It was unveiled by Sir John McNee, President of the BMA, on 2 November 1954. The dedication was given by Geoffrey Fisher, the Archbishop of Canterbury. Fisher's address spoke of "these medical men [who] saved others, themselves they could not and would not save". The World War II memorial was separately listed at Grade II* in 1998.

== See also ==
- Grade II* listed war memorials in England
- Grade II* listed buildings in the London Borough of Camden

== Footnotes, references and sources ==
=== Sources ===
- Cherry, Bridget; Pevsner, Nikolaus (2002). London 4: North. The Buildings of England. New Haven, US, London, UK: Yale University Press. ISBN 9780300096538.
- Darke, Jo (1991). The Monument Guide to England and Wales: A National Portrait in Bronze and Stone. London: MacDonald and Co. OCLC 1008240876.
- Ridley, Jane (2002). The Architect and his Wife: A Life of Edwin Lutyens. London: Chatto & Windus. ISBN 978-0-7011-7201-5.
- Summerson, John (1978). Georgian London. London: Barrie & Jenkins. ISBN 9780214204609. OCLC 493206778.
