= St Martin's Church, Gospel Oak =

Church in Gospel Oak, London

St Martin's Church
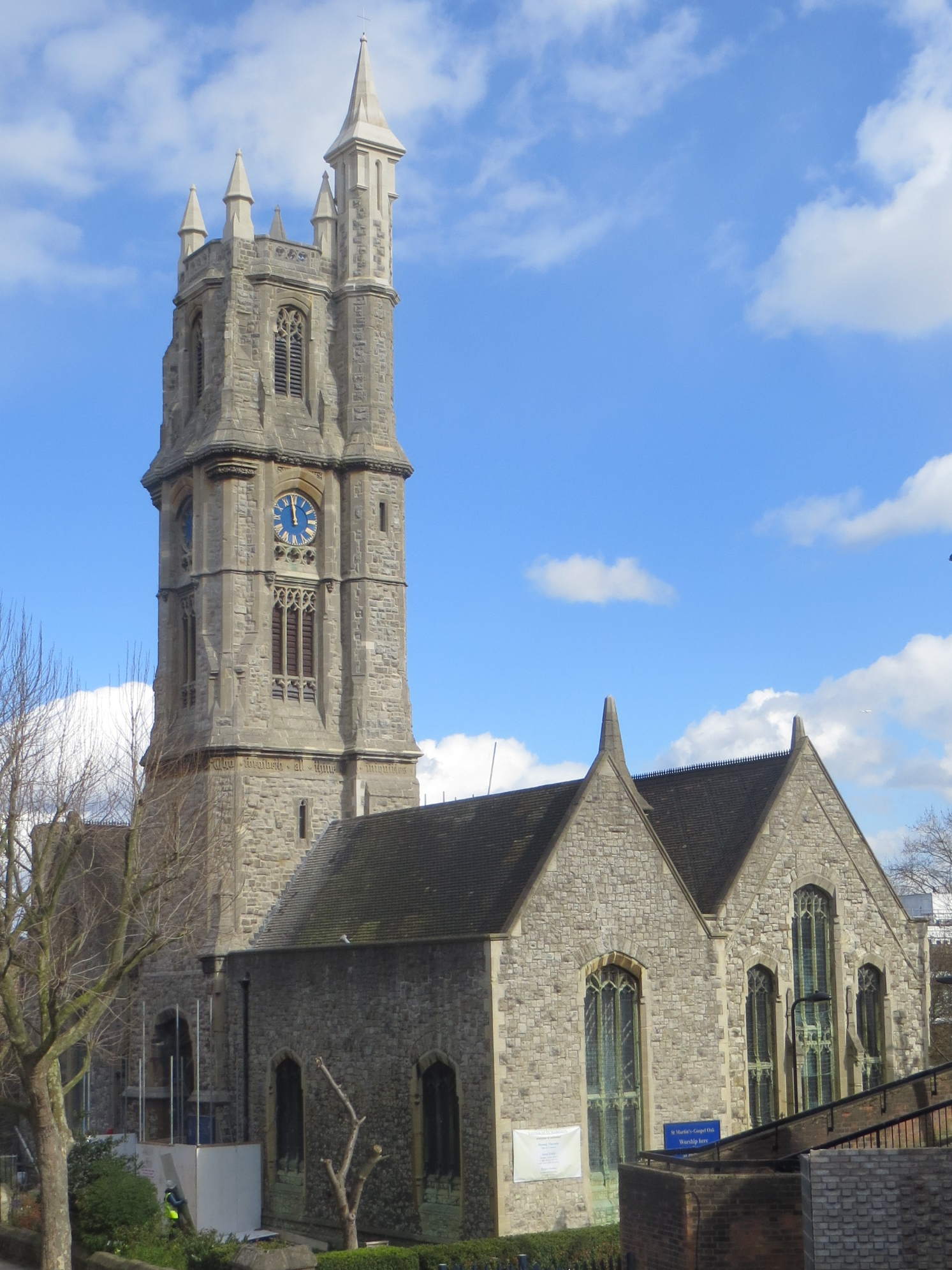
- St Martin's Church
- 51.5519°N 0.1529°W
- Denomination: Church of England

History
- Dedication: Martin of Tours

Architecture
- Heritage designation: Grade I
- Architect: Edward Buckton Lamb
- Style: Gothic Revival

St Martin's Church is a Church of England church in Gospel Oak in London, England. Located on Vicars Road, the church building is Grade I listed. The church was built between 1864 and 1866 to a curious-looking design by Edward Buckton Lamb and was discussed by John Summerson in his Victorian Architecture in England. The church was built at the personal cost of John Derby Allcroft to commemorate his late wife. The architectural historian Nikolaus Pevsner described it as "the craziest of London’s Victorian churches".

The tower is most notable for its pinnacles, which make it resemble a fairy-tale castle. These pinnacles were removed due to bomb damage in World War II, but were restored in works finishing in 2015.
