= St Christopher's Chapel, Great Ormond Street Hospital =

St Christopher's Chapel
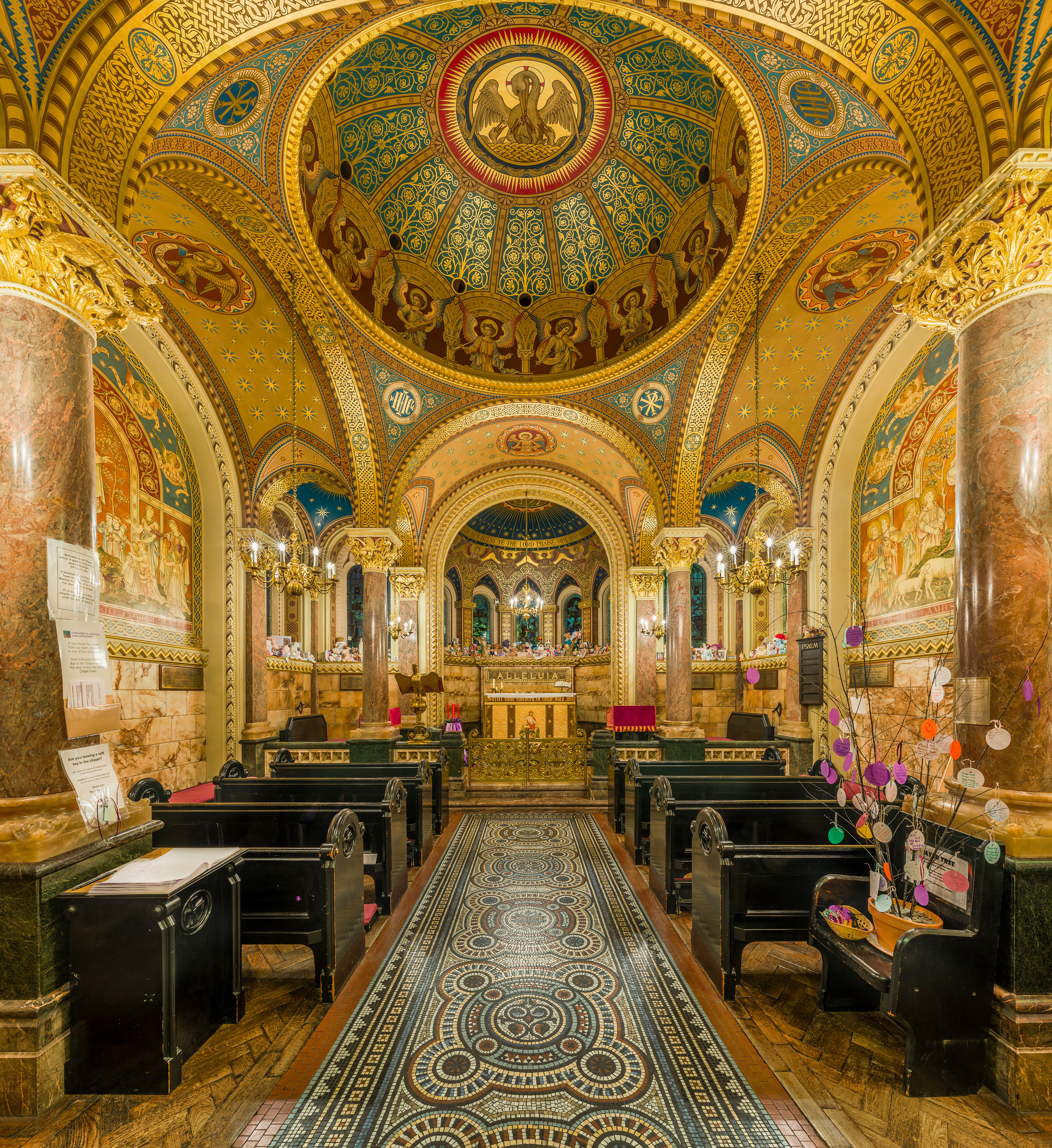
- Interior of the chapel
- St Christopher's Chapel
- 51.5222°N 0.121°W
- Location: Great Ormond Street, Bloomsbury, London
- Country: England
- Denomination: Ecumenical
- Previous denomination: Anglican

History
- Status: Active
- Dedication: Saint Christopher
- Consecrated: 18 November 1875 by Alfred Barry

Architecture
- Functional status: Hospital chapel
- Heritage designation: Grade II*
- Designated: 10 March 1980
- Architect: Edward Middleton Barry
- Completed: 1875

St Christopher's Chapel is the chapel of Great Ormond Street Hospital in London, England. It is a grade II* listed building and is noted for its highly decorated interior.

== History ==
Great Ormond Street Hospital was built from 1871 to 1876, and the chapel was completed in 1875. It had been designed by Edward Middleton Barry who donated his work to the hospital in memory of one of his children who had died in infancy. The chapel cost £60,000 to build. The chapel is a small rectangle with an apse at its east end. Its interior is highly decorated. The chapel was consecrated on 18 November 1875 by Canon Alfred Barry, later Bishop of Sydney and Primate of Australia.

On 10 March 1980, the chapel was designated a grade II* listed building.

Due to its listed status, the chapel could not be demolished when the old hospital building was knocked down in the 1980s. It was decided that the whole chapel would be moved to a new site. This was done by encasing the chapel in a large, water-proof box and underpinning with a concrete raft. Having emptied the interior of all its furniture and removed the stained-glass windows, the now encased chapel was lowered from the first floor to the ground floor. It was then moved by hydraulic rams to its new location; this is "thought to be the largest en bloc transportation of a structure ever undertaken". Six years after it was moved and after extensive renovation, the chapel was re-opened on 14 February 1994 by Diana, Princess of Wales.

=== Present ===
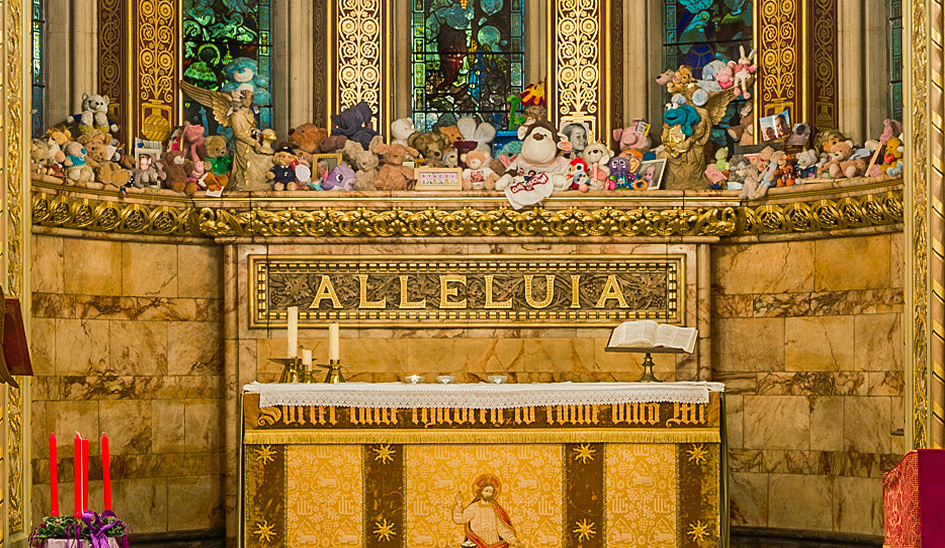
The "Teddy Bear Choir" behind the altar

The chapel is open at all times for patients, families and staff.

It is not open to the general public.

There is a service of morning prayer at 10:30 am Monday to Friday.

The chapel has a prayer tree where messages of hope and support can be written for sick children at the hospital and placed on the tree.

== Interior ==
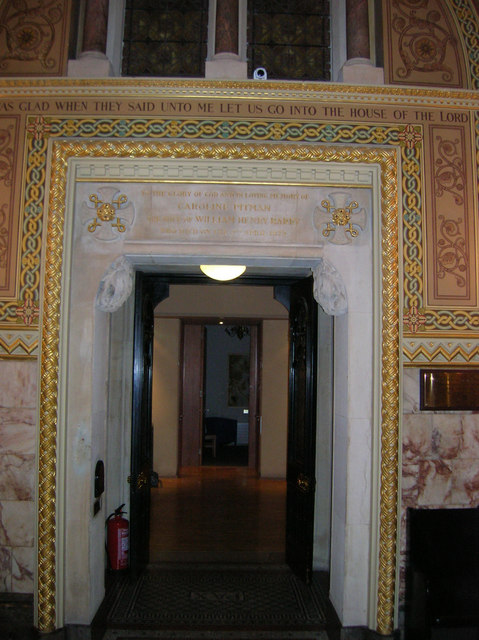
The doorway leaving St Christopher's Chapel

The chapel has been described as of the Franco-Italianate style and was influenced by the Renaissance Revival. The chapel "is divided by four columns, and has a central dome, with an apse at the east end". The terrazzo floor was designed by Antonio Salviati, an Italian mosaicist, and is said to be influenced by a pavement in St Mark's Basilica, Venice.

The interior is highly decorated with many of its images referring to childhood. The central dome is "painted with musician angels around the rim and pelican in piety" in its centre. The apse windows are stained glass designed by Clayton and Bell, and depict the childhood of Jesus Christ. The ceiling of the apse is decorated with eight angels (Faith, Truth, Patience, Purity, Obedience, Charity, Honour and Hope) with a central roundel depicting the Lamb and flag.

There are a number of Bible quotes with accompanying murals decorating the walls. These include "Suffer little children to come unto me" (Luke 18:16) and "feed my lambs + feed my sheep" (John 21:16). Above the door it states: "I was glad when they said unto me let us go into the House of the Lord" (Psalm 122:1).

== Memorials ==
There are a number of memorial plaques on the walls of the chapel. They include:

- Sir James Matthew Barrie, 1st Baronet (1860–1937), novelist and playwright, author of Peter Pan. He gave the copyright to the Peter Pan works to Great Ormond Street Hospital in 1929.
- William Henry Barry (1823–1880), who endowed the chapel
- Charles Dickens, author and early fundraiser for the hospital.
- Lt Col Alexander Simpson-Smith, RAMC (1900–1942). He was a surgeon at the hospital but volunteered for the British Army during the Second World War. He died in 1942 while serving in Egypt.
