= 6 Ellerdale Road =

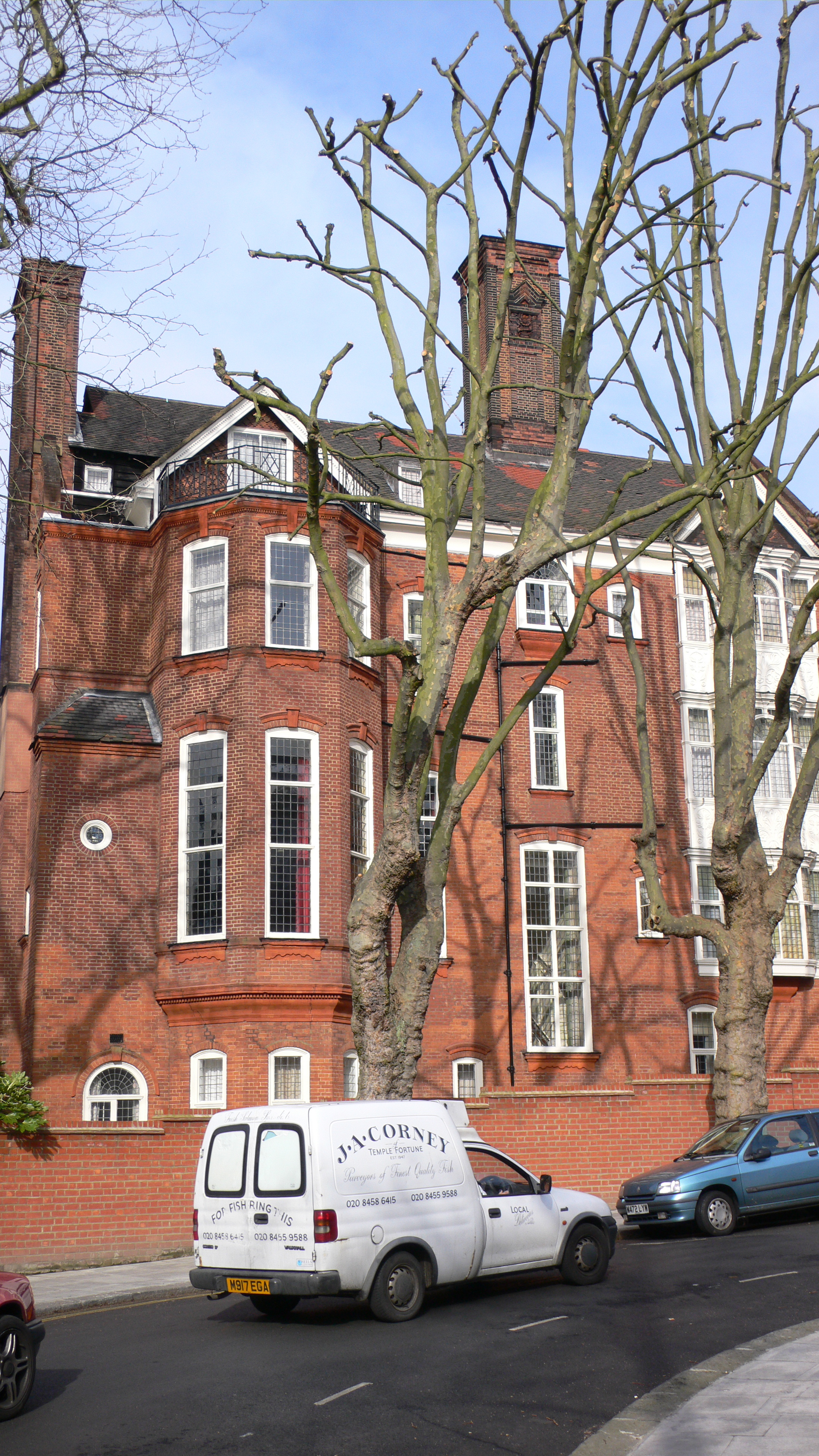
- Front of 6 Ellerdale Road

- Location within London Borough of Camden
- 51°33′17″N 0°10′42″W
- Location: Camden
- OS grid reference: TQ 26327 85528

History
- Built: 1874–1876

Site notes
- Area: Greater London
- Architect: Richard Norman Shaw
- Architectural style: Arts and Crafts

Listed Building – Grade I
- Official name: Institute of St Marcellina
- Designated: 11 August 1950
- Reference no.: 1078274

6 Ellerdale Road (now the Institute of St Marcellina) is a house built by the Arts and Crafts movement architect Richard Norman Shaw for himself in the period 1874 to 1876.

It is a large red brick detached house between Frognal and Hampstead in London.

It was designated a Grade I listed building in 1950. Since 2006 it has been used as residential accommodation for foreign female students attending English courses in London. Run by the Sisters of Saint Marcellina, it is now known as Hampstead Towers.
