= Old Conduit House =

House in London, England

Coordinates: 51.5521°N 0.1746°W

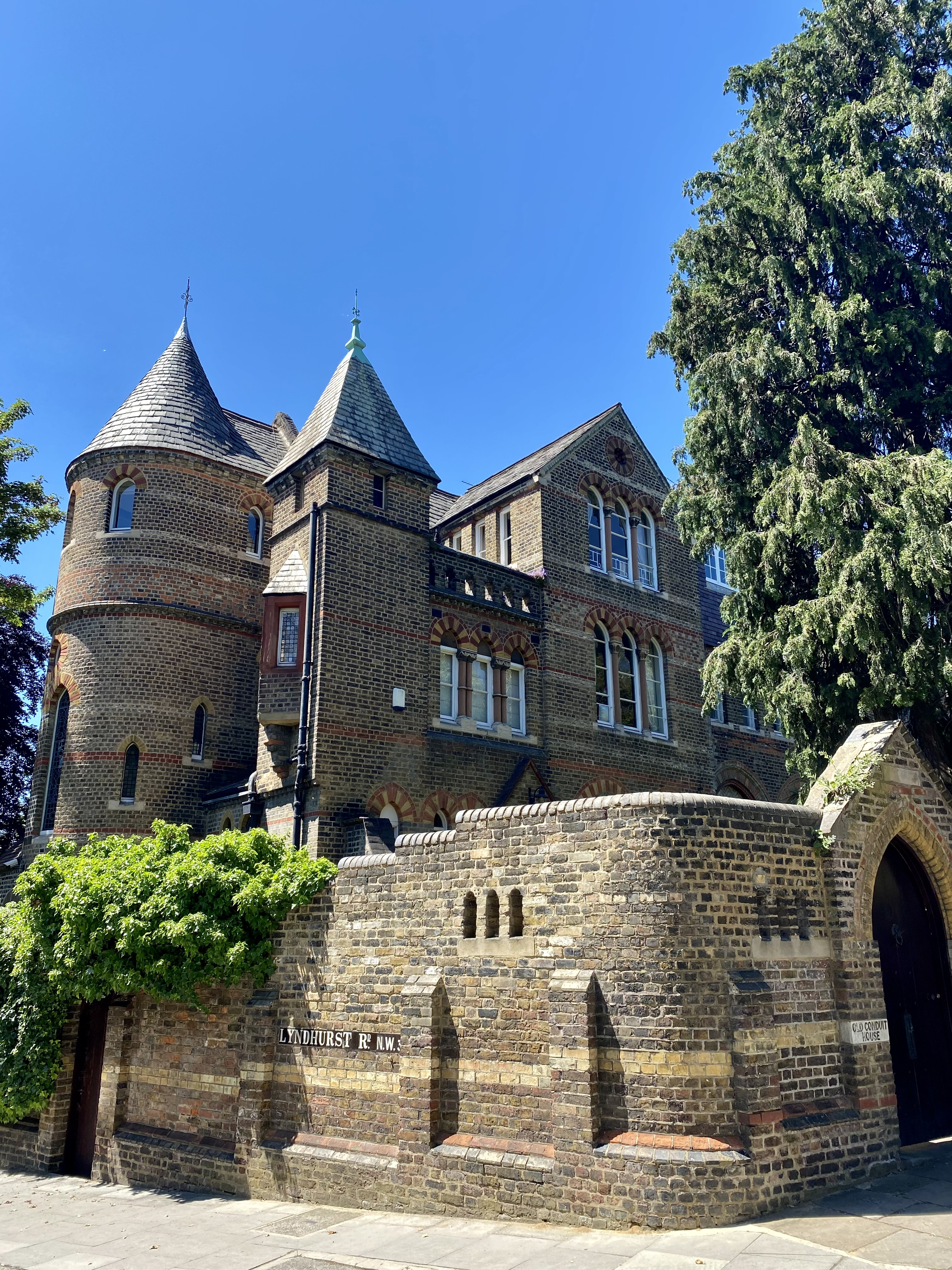
Old Conduit House in June 2021

Old Conduit House at 1 Lyndhurst Terrace is a semi-detached house in Hampstead, London NW3. The property is listed Grade II* on the National Heritage List for England with the conjoining 3 Lyndhurst Terrace.

The houses were built by the stained glass manufacturers John Burlison and his son-in-law, Alfred Bell (of the firm Clayton and Bell), for themselves. Burlison was Bell's father-in-law and a door originally separated the two properties. The houses were originally named Oswald House and Barford House. The houses were combined into a single residence after Burlison's death in 1868 and renamed Bayford House. Charles Buckridge designed a Gothic interior for Bell in the new house. Old Conduit Lodge was built in the grounds of Bayford house as a wedding present for the owner's daughter.

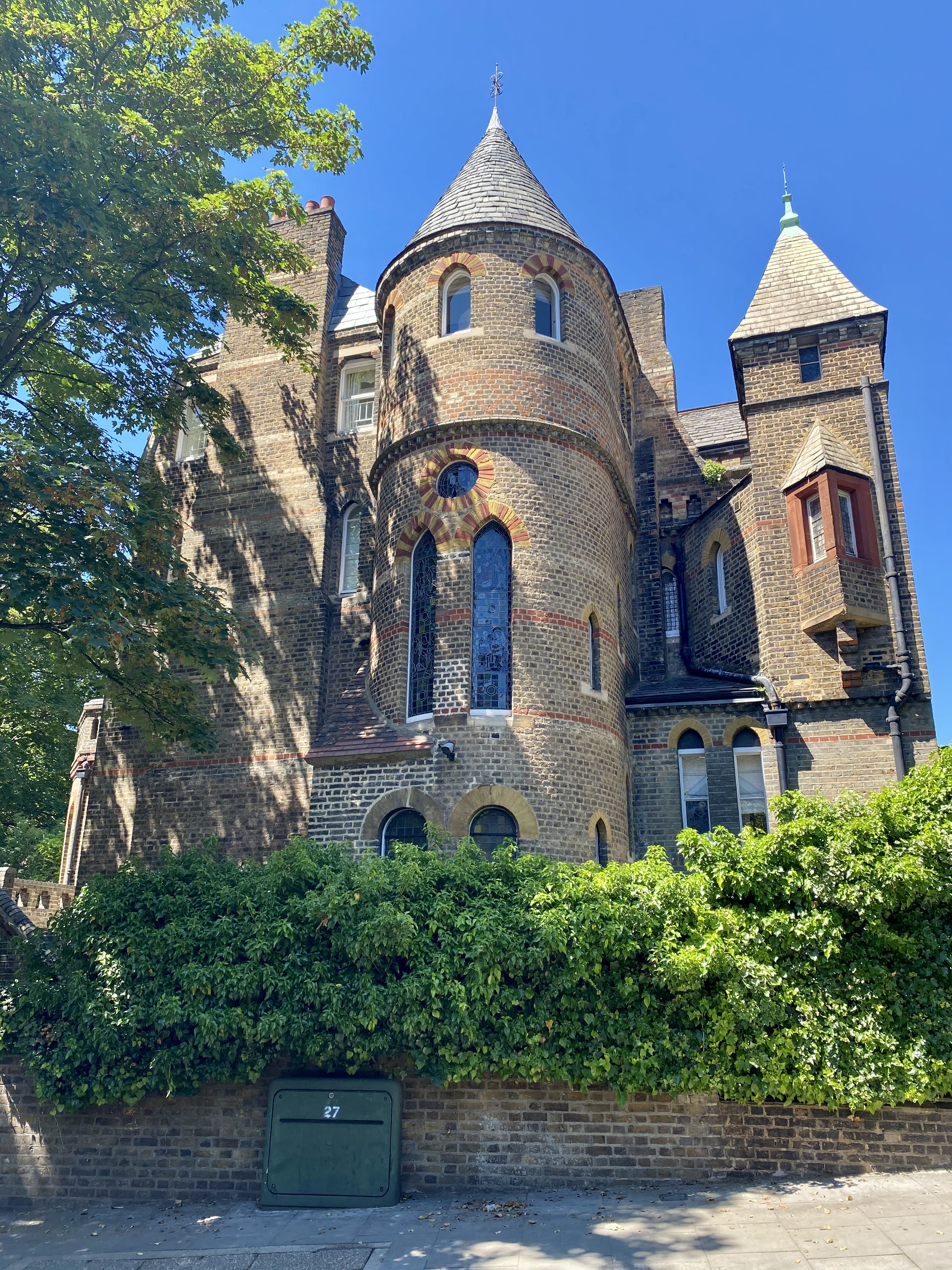
Old Conduit House from Lyndhurst Road

The artist and author, Ernest Goodwin, bought Bayford House around 1931 and renamed it Old Conduit House in 1934. Goodwin lived there until his death in 1944. His widow remained living in the house until 1994. The upper floors of Old Conduit House were divided into bedsits in the 20th century. The novelist Fay Weldon was a frequent visitor and wrote about the house in her 1995 novel Splitting.

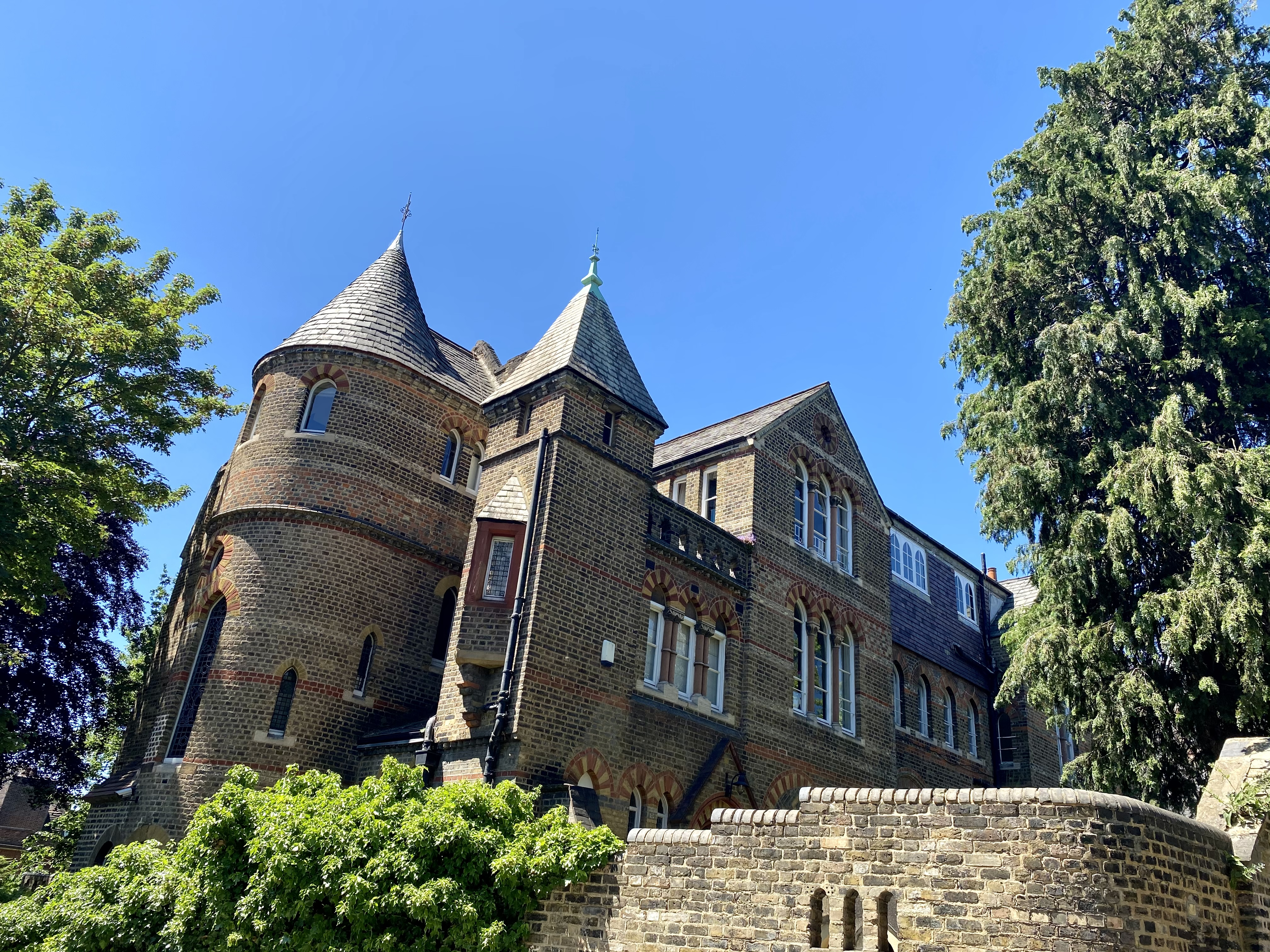
The elaborate upper floors of Old Conduit House

Old Conduit House was offered for sale for £1.75 million in 2003.
