= Hampstead Synagogue =

Orthodox Jewish synagogue in Hampstead, London, England

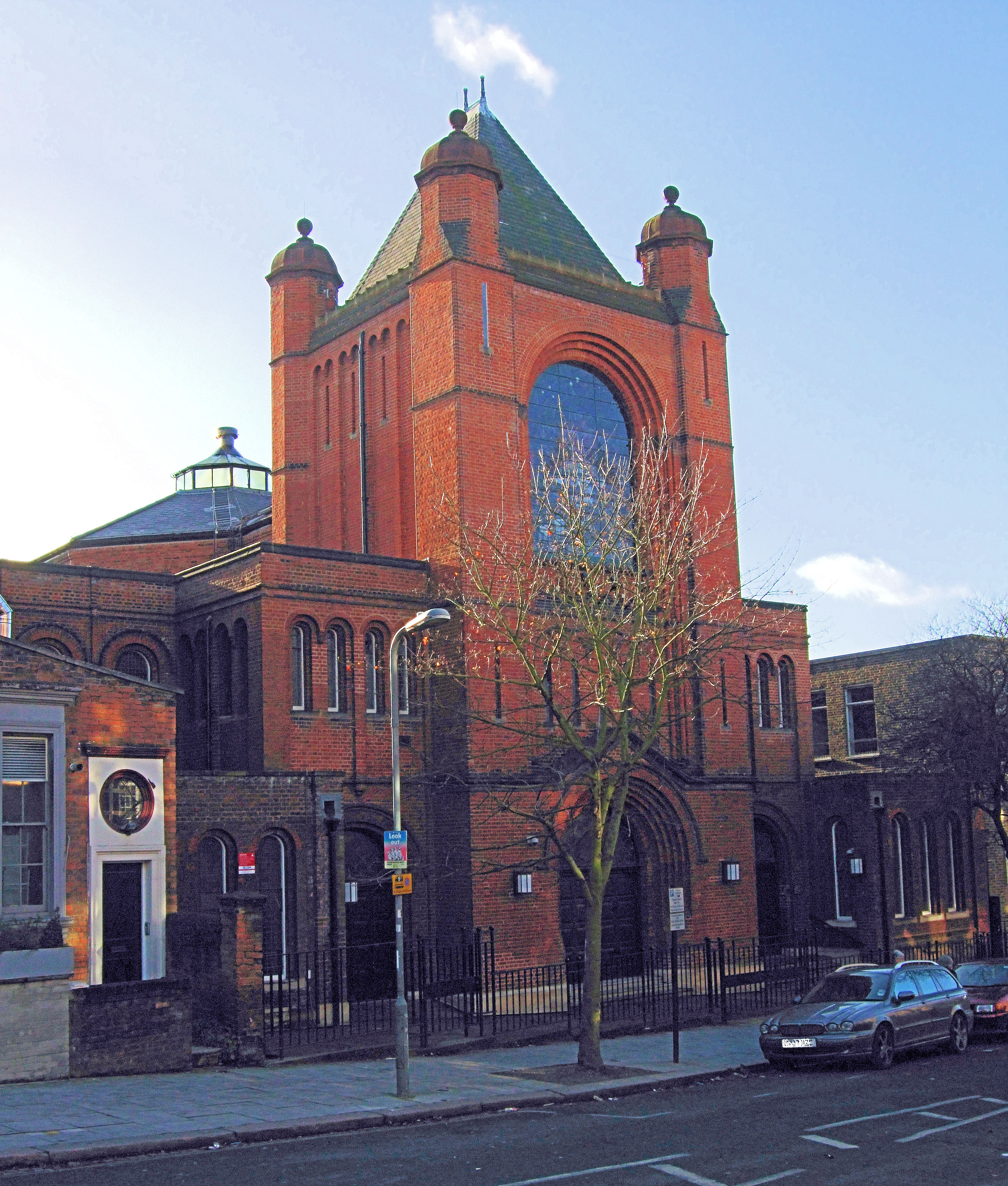
- The synagogue in 2012

- Location of the synagogue in Greater London

Religion
- Affiliation: Orthodox Judaism
- Ecclesiastical or organisational status: Synagogue
- Leadership: Rabbi Dr Michael Harris
- Status: Active

Location
- Location: 1 Dennington Park Road, West Hampstead, Borough of Camden, London, England NW6 1AX
- Country: United Kingdom
- Coordinates: 51°32′59″N 0°11′31″W

Architecture
- Architect: Delissa Joseph (1900)
- Established: 1889 (as a congregation)
- Groundbreaking: 1892
- Completed: 1901

Website
- hampsteadshul.org.uk

Listed Building – Grade II*
- Official name: Hampstead Synagogue
- Type: Listed Building
- Designated: 24 September 1989
- Reference no.: 1271984

Hampstead Synagogue is an Orthodox Jewish congregation and synagogue, located in Dennington Park Road, West Hampstead, in the Borough of Camden, London, England, in the United Kingdom. The synagogue building was completed in 1901 and was Grade II* listed with English Heritage in 1989.

The congregation is a member of the United Synagogue and has been led by Rabbi Dr Michael Harris since 1995. The community holds learning events, concerts, and social meetings for the members and visitors. The Hampstead Synagogue holds some of the largest seasonal celebrations in the area.

== Notable members ==
- Sir Isaiah Berlin

== See also ==
- History of the Jews in England
- List of Jewish communities in the United Kingdom
- List of synagogues in the United Kingdom
