= Euston Fire Station =

Grade II* listed fire station in London, England

Coordinates: 51.52765°N 0.13089°W

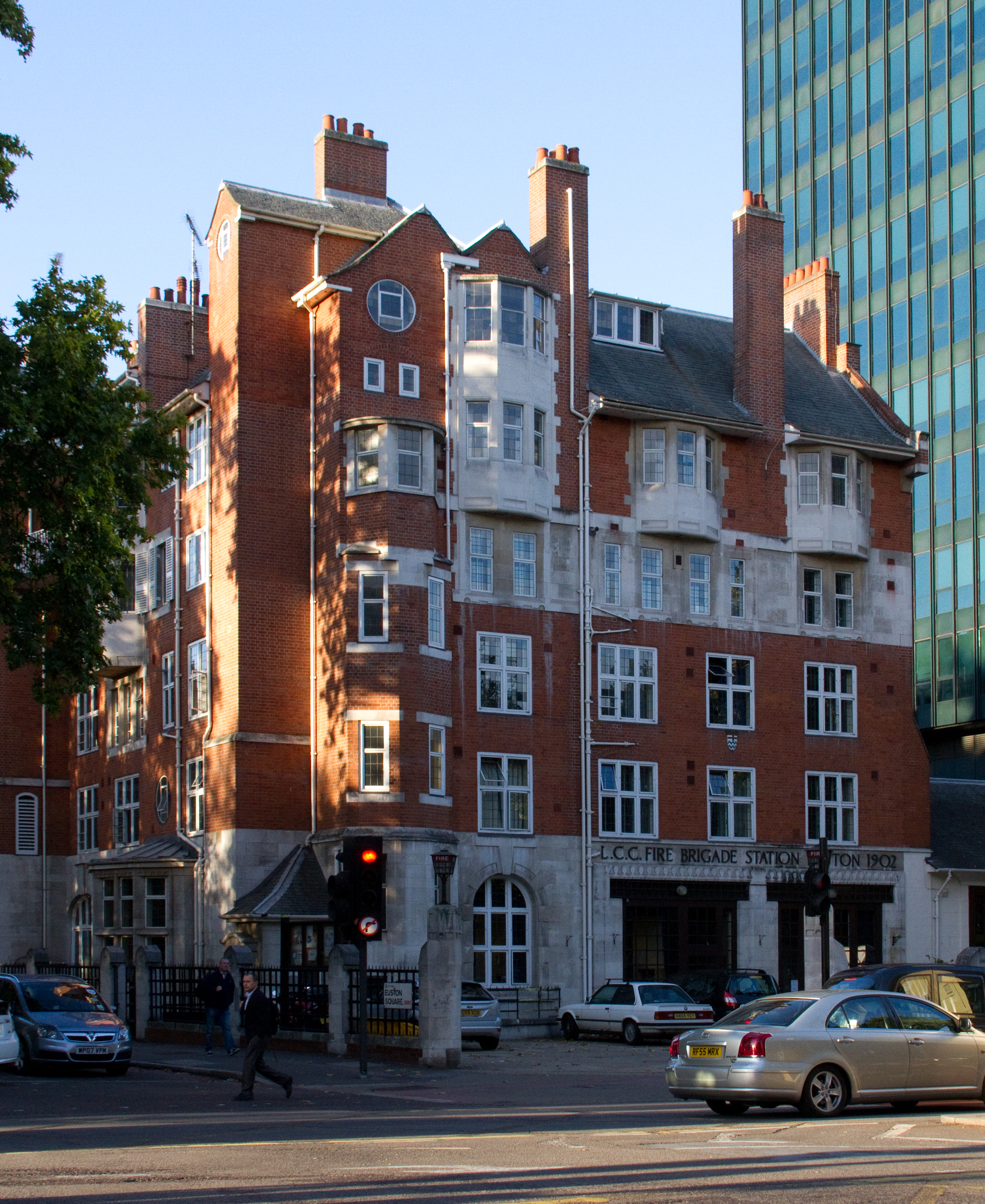
Euston Fire Station

Euston Fire Station is a grade II* listed operational fire station in London utilized by the London Fire Brigade. Located on Euston Road in the London Borough of Camden, close to Euston railway station, it was built in 1901–1902 and altered and extended later in the twentieth century. It was designed by H. F. T. Cooper for the Fire Brigade Branch of the London County Council Architects' Department and built by Stimpson & Co.

Euston fire station replaced the Metropolitan Board of Works station. It opened on 27 November 1902. Euston was the headquarters of the North Division of the London Fire Brigade, under the command of a Third Officer, the third-highest rank in some pre-war British fire brigades. Divisional staff had domestic accommodation provided for them on the first floor and for the Third Officer on the fourth floor. The station currently houses 1 Pump Ladder and one of the brigades 14 Rescue Units.
