= 40 Well Walk =

House in Hampstead, London

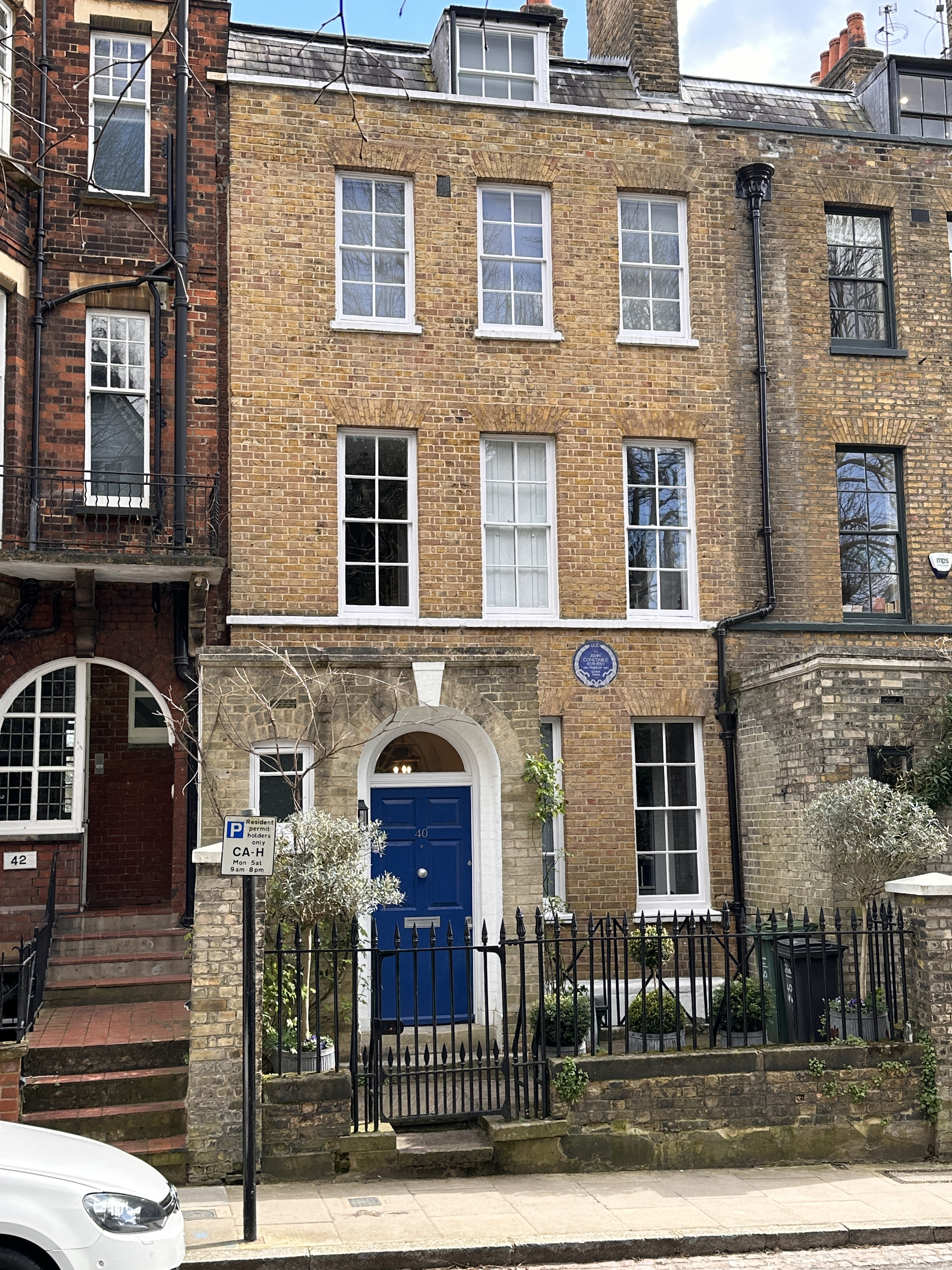

General information
- Architectural style: Georgian
- Location: Hampstead, London, England
- Coordinates: 51°33′32″N 0°10′24″W
- Completed: Early 19th Century

Listed Building – Grade II*
- Official name: Number 40 and Attached Railings, Walls and Gates
- Designated: 11 Aug 1950
- Reference no.: 1379169

40 Well Walk is a Grade II* listed house in Hampstead, London. It was completed in the early 19th century and is an example of Georgian Architecture. The house is known as being one of many residences of painter John Constable in Hampstead.

== John Constable ==
John Constable first moved to Hampstead in 1819, moving between various lodgings including Albion Cottage, 2 Lower Terrace and Stamford Lodge. He then moved into 40 Well Walk in 1827 and remained there until his death in 1837. Many of Constable's best known works were painted in Hampstead and a number of them during his time as a resident of Well Walk.
