= Holly Hill, Hampstead =

Street in London, England

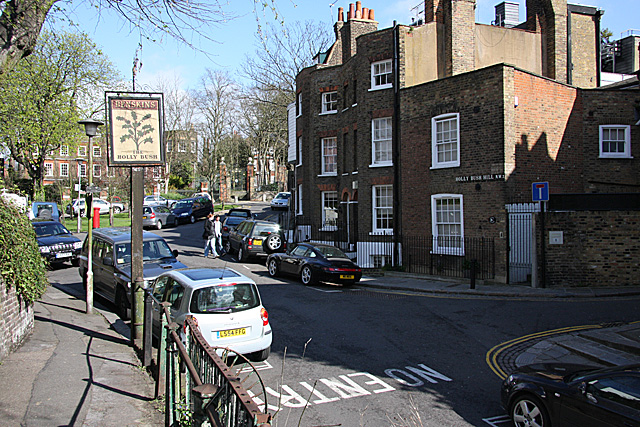
The square at Holly Bush Hill, with Fenton House in the background.

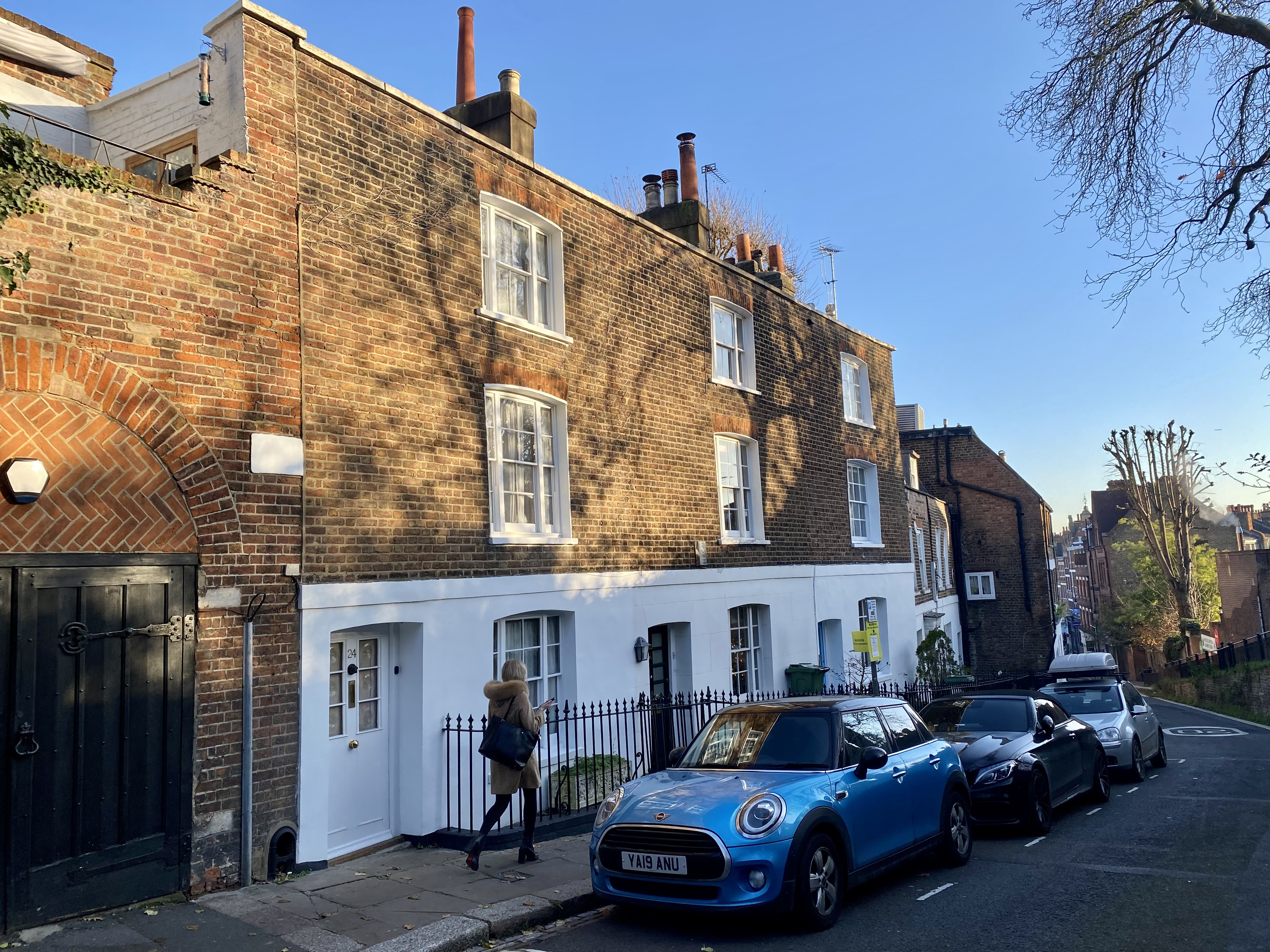
Grade II listed nineteenth century houses on the Hill.

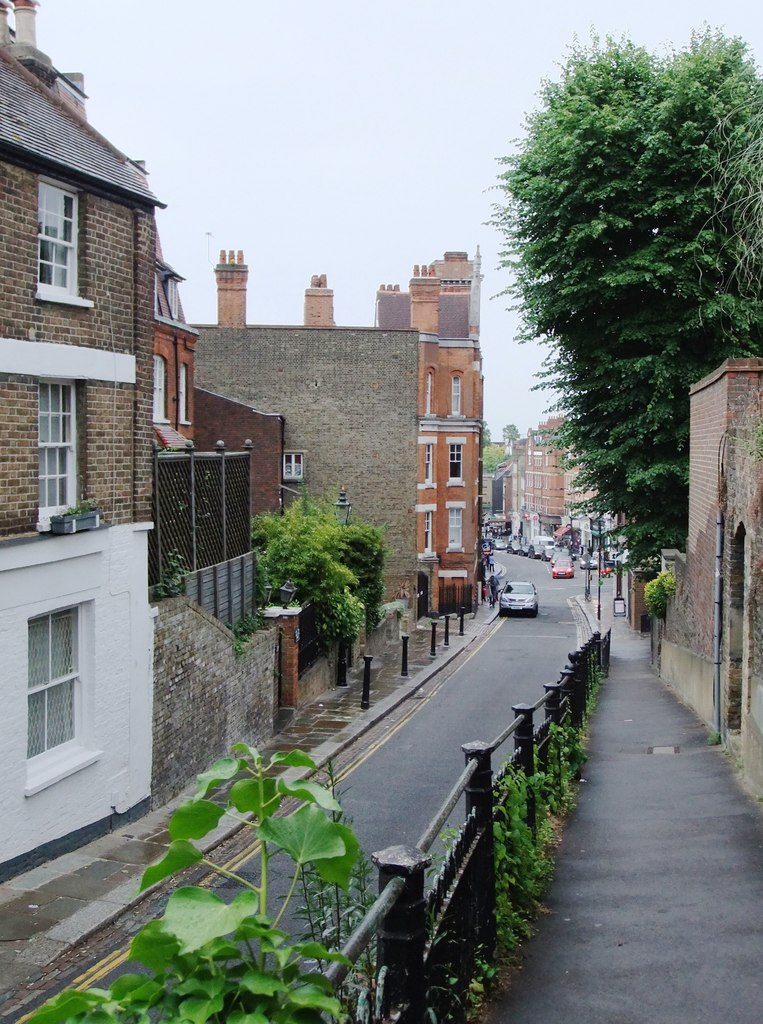
Looking southwards towards Hampstead High Street.

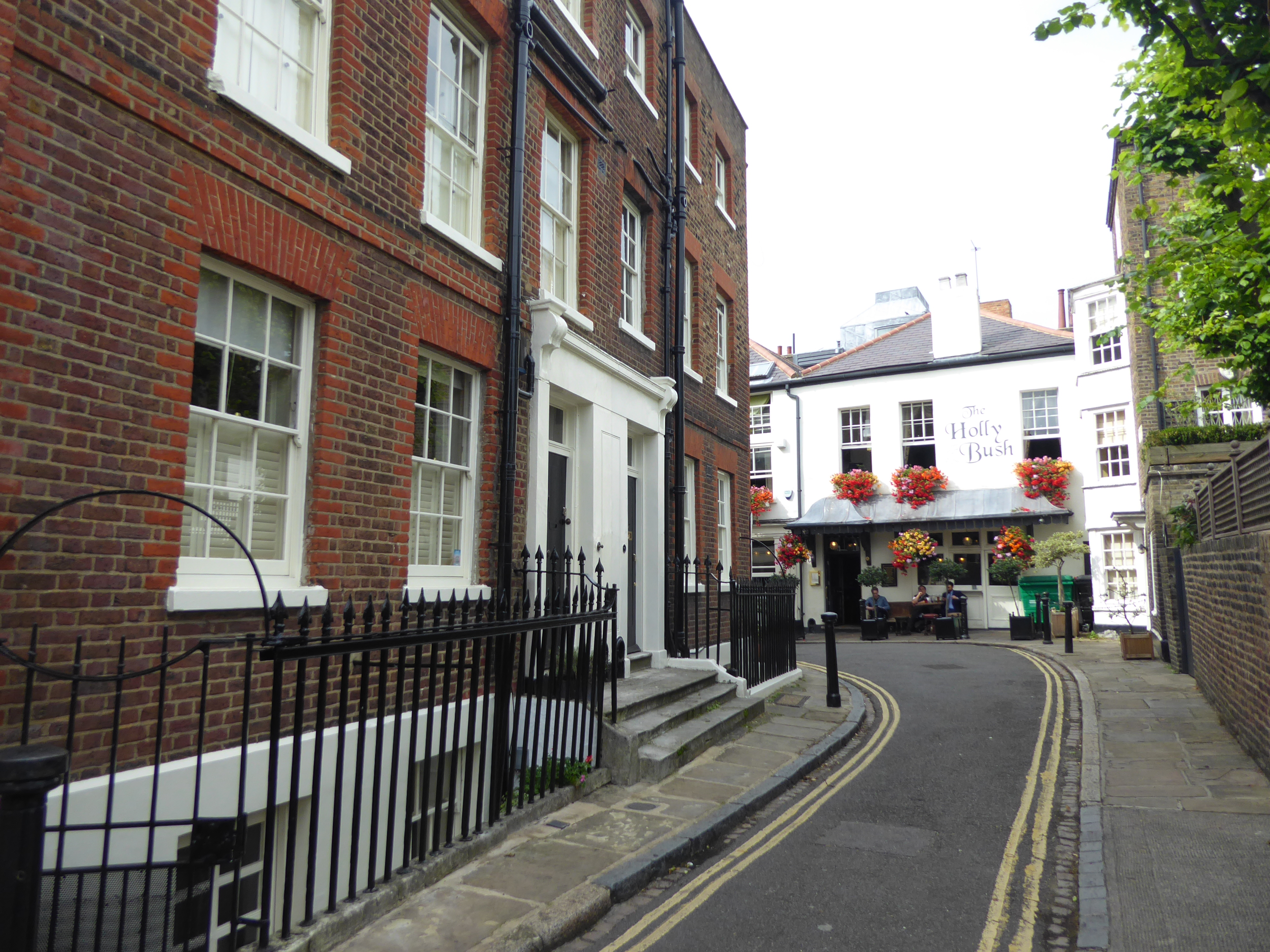
Holly Mount and The Holly Bush pub.

Holly Hill is a street in Hampstead in the London Borough of Camden. It runs northwards from a junction with Hampstead High Street and Heath Street, Hampstead heading uphill to a grassy triangle named Holly Bush Hill where it meets Windmill Hill and Hampstead Grove by the entrance to Fenton House.

The street takes its name from a grove of holly bushes which stood on the hill until the 1940s. In the eighteenth century it was known as Cloth Hill, likely because local laundresses using Hampstead Wells hung their clothes out on the Holly Bushes to dry. Holly Mount turns eastwards off the street and forms a cul-de-sac, although there are steps linking it to Heath Street below. Holly Mount contains The Holly Bush pub, which was once linked to the nearby assembly rooms.

Notable residents of Holly Hill have included the artists George Romney and Derek Hill, both commemorated with blue plaques. A number of properties are now Grade II listed. Romney's House at 5 Holly Bush Hill is Grade I listed. Running uphill to the west is Mount Vernon, which also features notable historic properties and Holly Walk.

== Bibliography ==
- Bebbington, Gillian, London Street Names. Batsford, 1972.
- Cherry, Bridget & Pevsner, Nikolaus. London 4: North. Yale University Press, 2002.
- Wade, Christopher, The Streets of Hampstead. Camden History Society, 2000.
