= Flask Walk =

Street in London, England

Coordinates: 51.5573°N 0.1766°W

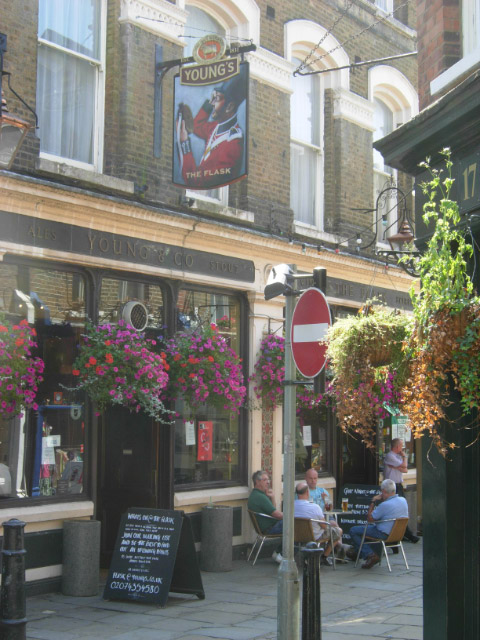
The Flask public house.

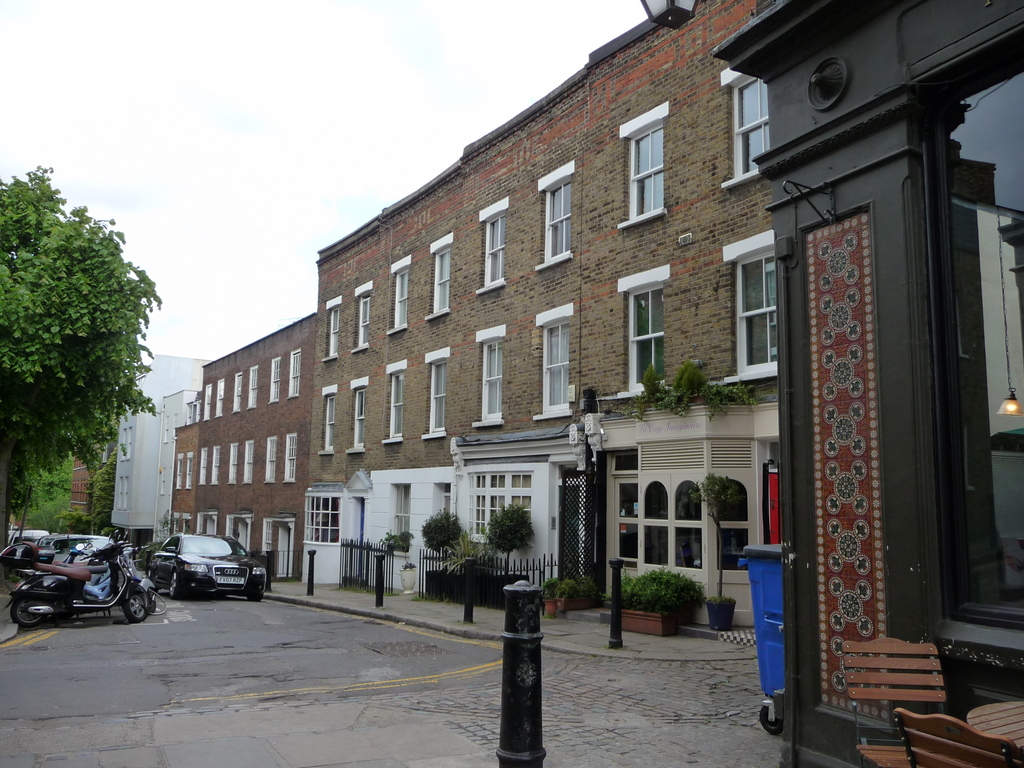
Looking eastwards.

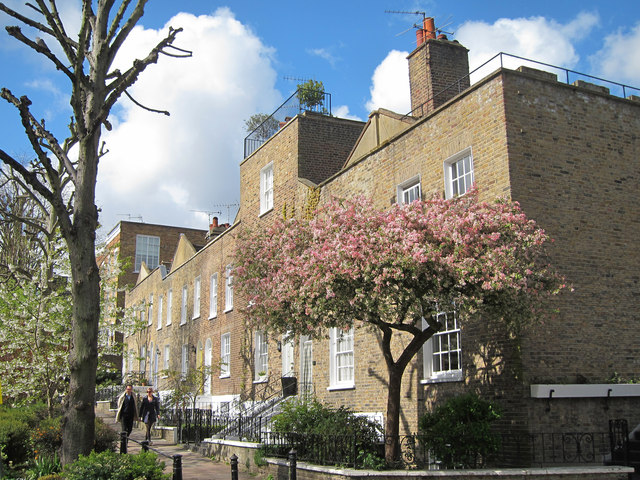
Looking westwards.

Flask Walk is a street in Hampstead in the London Borough of Camden. It runs eastwards from Hampstead High Street to a junction with Well Walk and New End Square. It is primarily residential but the western end of the street is a pedestrianised alley featuring commercial properties. Hampstead tube station is located close to the junction with the High Street.

It takes its name indirectly from the flasks made for the mineral water produced at the nearby Hampstead Wells. The Flask public house is located near the western end of the street and was built in 1767, although the current building is Victorian. An earlier Upper Flask Tavern was a meeting place of the Kit Kat Club of the early eighteenth century, located in nearby Heath Street.

A number of buildings in the street are now Grade II listed, many dating from the Regency era of the nineteenth century or earlier. The street also housed the former Wells and Campden Baths, designed by Henry Simpson Legg, surveyor for the Hampstead Wells Trust, built in 1888 and closed in 1978. The 1736 Gardnor House is on the southern side of the street. A planned station of the Metropolitan Railway was due to be located at the eastern end of the street, but although authorised in the 1860s it was never constructed.

== Bibliography ==
- Bebbington, Gillian. London Street Names. Batsford, 1972.
- Bucholz, Robert O. & Ward, Joseph P. London: A Social and Cultural History, 1550–1750. Cambridge University Press, 2012.
- Cherry, Bridget & Pevsner, Nikolaus. London 4: North. Yale University Press, 2002.
- Porter, Roy. London: A Social History. Penguin, 2000.
- Wade, Christopher. The Streets of Hampstead. Camden History Society, 2000.
