= George William Potter =

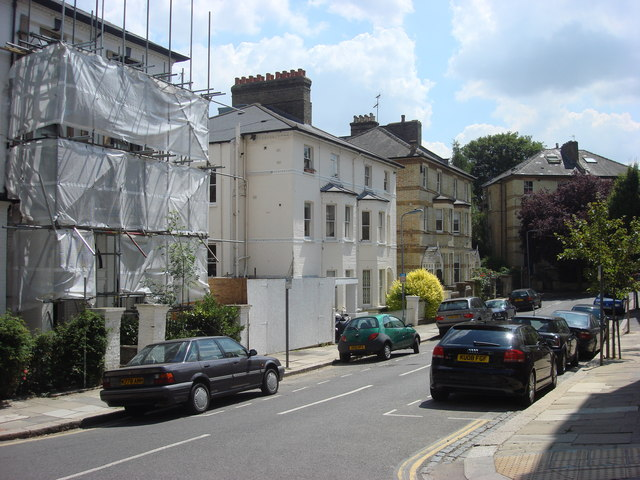
A modern view of Gayton Crescent, Hampstead.

George William Potter (1831 – 14 April 1919) was a builder, estate agent and surveyor in Hampstead, London, whose firm contributed to the modern development of Hampstead and Hampstead Garden Suburb. As a builder, he constructed the houses in Gayton Crescent and Gayton Road. Late in life he wrote two books of recollections of the history of Hampstead.

== Early life and family ==
George Potter was born in Hertford in 1831 to George Potter, a carpenter, and his wife Rebecca. He married Elizabeth and they had daughters Edith, Elizabeth, Frances and Helen, and sons Herbert, William, and Francis (Frank). Francis went on to become a fellow of the Royal Institute of British Architects. Herbert worked as a "Surveyors Auctioneer", probably in the family firm. In 1881, the family were living at 27 Gayton Road, Hampstead. In 1891 they were living at Gardnor House, built by Thomas Gardnor around 1736. In 1901 they were at 4 Gayton Crescent.

== Career ==
Census returns show Potter as a builder and later an estate agent and surveyor. From 1871 he was responsible for building the houses in Gayton Road and Gayton Crescent, Hampstead, where he also lived, on land belonging to the Norfolk barrister George Nathan Best. In 1909, the firm of Potter were described as having "carried on business as Land and Estate Agents in Hampstead for upwards of 50 years" in a book published to promote the Hampstead Garden Suburb which was then under construction. Frank Potter created designs for houses in the garden suburb.

== Local history ==
Potter was a trustee of the Wells and Camden Charity and a member of the Hampstead Antiquarian and Historical Society. His book on Hampstead wells was described by The Antiquary as of "considerable original value" as he had drawn it up not from the usual anecdotal sources, but from personal recollection and researches into leases and the pleadings in lawsuits. It included 13 illustrations from sketches done by the author.

== Death ==
Potter died at Stowe March, Barnet Lane, Elstree, on 14 April 1919. He was buried in Elstree and left an estate of £19,205.

== Selected publications ==
- Justice, Murdered, Rises from the Dead, 1918
- Hampstead wells: A short history of their rise and decline. George Bell & Sons, London, 1904.
- Random recollections of Hampstead. Eyre & Spottiswoode, London, 1907.
