= The Flask, Hampstead =

Listed pub in London, England

The Flask
- The pub in 2025

- Location within London Borough of Camden Location within Greater London

General information
- Type: Public house
- Location: 14 Flash Walk, Hampstead, London, England
- Coordinates: 51.5566°N 0.1773°W
- Year built: 1874; 152 years ago
- Renovated: 1990 (extended)
- Owner: Young's

Design and construction
- Architects: Cumming and Nixon
- Designations

Listed Building – Grade II
- Official name: Flask public house
- Designated: 14 May 1974
- Reference no.: 1322190

Website
- theflaskhampstead.co.uk

The Flask is a Grade II listed public house on Flask Walk in Hampstead, London, England. The present building dates from 1874 and occupies the site of an earlier tavern associated with Hampstead's mineral-water trade from at least 1700. The pub has been owned by Young's since 1904. Its interior is included on the Campaign for Real Ale (CAMRA)'s National Inventory of Historic Pub Interiors and is rated three stars, denoting an interior of "outstanding national historic importance".

== Name ==
The public house occupied earlier premises known as the Lower Flask, to distinguish it from the Upper Flask, a tavern near the top of Hampstead Hill which was patronised by Whig grandees and writers but closed in the 1750s. The clientele of the Lower Flask was considered inferior, and it appears in Samuel Richardson's novel Clarissa as the haunt of a drunk: "I have got the fellow down! — I have got old Grimes — hah, hah, hah, hah! — He is at the Lower Flask — almost in the condition of David's sow...". The premises were also known as the Thatched House until they were rebuilt by Cumming and Nixon in 1874, when it became known simply as The Flask.

== History ==
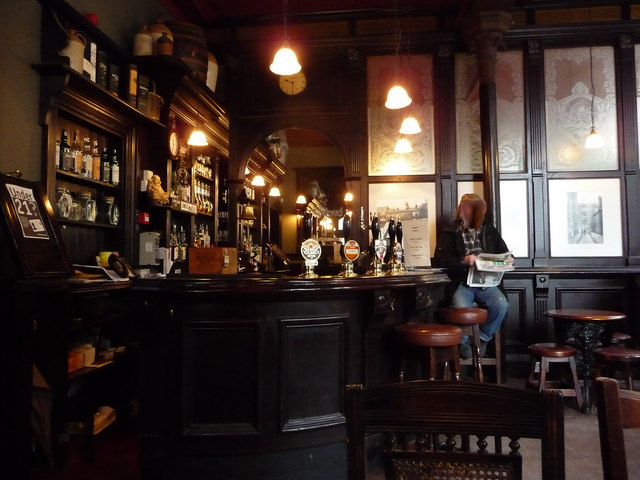
The public bar in 2009

On the site stood the original Flask Tavern from where the Hampstead mineral water business was run from at least 1700. The distribution of the water, at 3d per flask, was arranged by a London apothecary called Mr Philips, who operated in Fleet Street from the Eagle and Child pub. The advertising claimed that "eminent physicians and many gentry who had previously drunk the Tunbridge waters" now preferred the Hampstead water.

The pub was acquired by Young's in 1904 and, as of June 2026, continued to own its freehold.

On 14 May 1974, The Flask was designated a Grade II listed building. A 1990 extension to the rear of the premises led to the discovery of a brick-vaulted cellar. The pub is regarded by the Campaign for Real Ale (CAMRA) as having an interior of "outstanding national historic importance" and is rated three stars on its National Inventory of Historic Pub Interiors.

== Architecture ==
=== Exterior ===
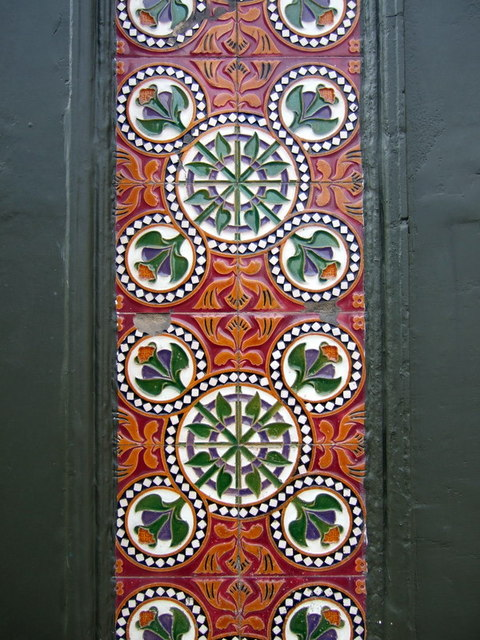
The exterior tiles in 2008

The building is constructed of yellow brick with decorative stucco detailing, while the roof is concealed from view. It has three storeys above a basement level. The main frontage contains four windows, with a further three on the return elevation to the north. Two entrance doorways are positioned between tall ground-floor windows and are framed by decorative vertical features finished with glazed tiles. Ornamental roundels appear beneath the upper cornice. The first-floor windows have decorative arched surrounds, while those on the second floor are set within recessed panels with projecting details above. A moulded band runs below the parapet at roof level.

=== Interior ===
There are four distinct areas. At the front are a public bar and a separate saloon bar. The public bar is more simply furnished and historically charged lower prices than the more elaborate saloon. Both bars retain original features, while to the rear are a later drinking area and a conservatory. According to CAMRA, the most notable features of the interior are the wood-and-glass screen separating the two bars and five chromolithographs after paintings by the Belgian artist Jan van Beers. CAMRA also notes the suitability of the surname "van Beers" for a pub.

Historic England highlights the comparatively intact interior, drawing attention to the mahogany-and-glass partitions, the bar counter and fittings, the original cast-iron fireplaces with tiled surrounds, moulded ceiling cornices, wall tiling, and the "Victorian chromolithographs".

== Flask Walk ==
The artist Charles Ginner's 1937 painting Flask Walk, Hampstead, on Coronation Day shows the vista down Flask Walk as seen from the upstairs of his residence at 61 Hampstead High Street, and includes The Flask on the right-hand side of the image. The painting was bought by the Tate Gallery in 1941.

Notable residents of Flask Walk have included the actor Peter Barkworth, the poet Al Alvarez, and the musician Sid Vicious.

== See also ==
- List of pubs in London
