= Frank J. Potter =

British architect

- Born: Francis John Potter; 1871; Hampstead, London, England
- Died: 1948 (aged 76–77); Hampstead, London
- Occupation: Architect
- Known for: Designing the Hampstead Observatory and the Carlton Tavern
- Father: George William Potter

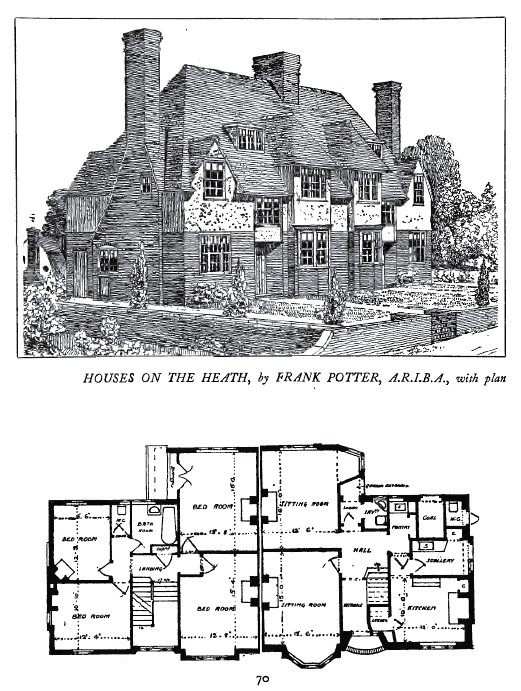
Potter's design for houses at Hampstead Garden Suburb.

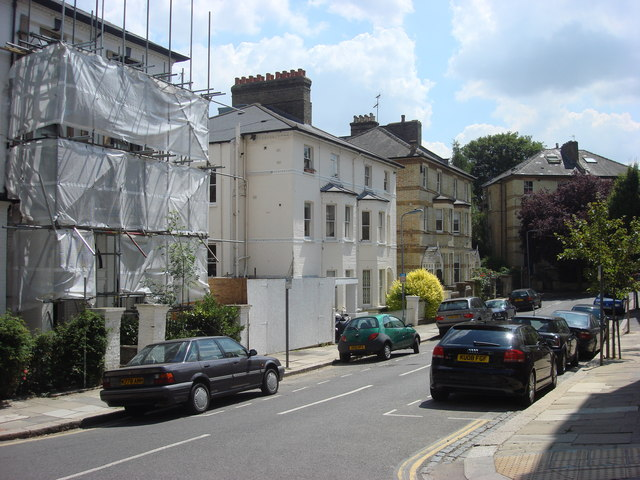
A modern view of Gayton Crescent, Hampstead.

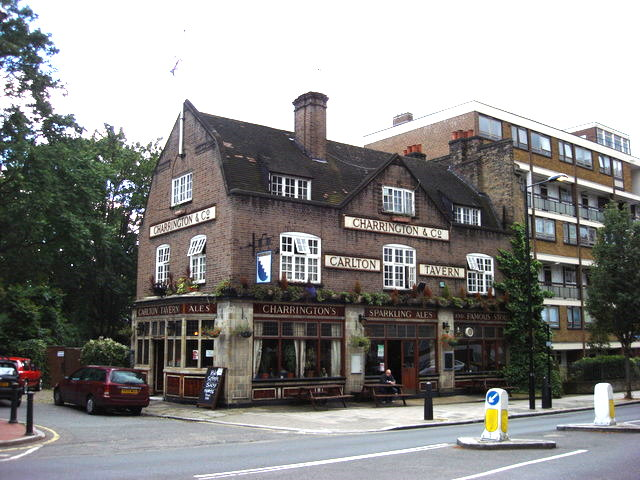
The Carlton Tavern. Designed by Frank Potter in 1920-21 (demolished 2015, rebuilt 2021).

Francis "Frank" John Potter (1871–1948) was a British architect who designed the new Hampstead Observatory and the Carlton Tavern in Kilburn, London.

== Early life and family ==
Frank Potter was born in Hampstead, London, in 1871 to George William Potter (born Hertford 1831), a builder and later estate agent and surveyor, and Elizabeth Potter. He had sisters Edith, Elizabeth, Frances and Helen, and brothers Herbert and William. In 1881 the family were living at 27 Gayton Road, Hampstead, and at 4 Gayton Crescent in 1901. In 1911, he was boarding at 29 Gayton Road.

== Career ==
In 1909, Potter's designs for semi-detached houses on Hampstead Heath were included in a book about Hampstead Garden Suburb.

Also in 1909, Potter was the architect for the new Hampstead Observatory after it moved from Hampstead Heath to a site off Lower Terrace in Hampstead village.

Potter was the architect of the new Carlton Tavern, Kilburn, London, built in 1920-21 for Charrington & Co. It replaced an earlier pub on the same site that was destroyed by a German Zeppelin bomb in 1918. The pub was demolished by Ori Calif's property development company C.L.T.X. Limited in April 2015. The pub has since been rebuilt by order of the local authority, and it reopened in April 2021. Potter was an associate and then a fellow of the Royal Institute of British Architects.

== Death ==
Potter died in Hampstead in 1948.
