= Hampstead Grove =

Street in London, England

Coordinates: 51.5595°N 0.1794°W

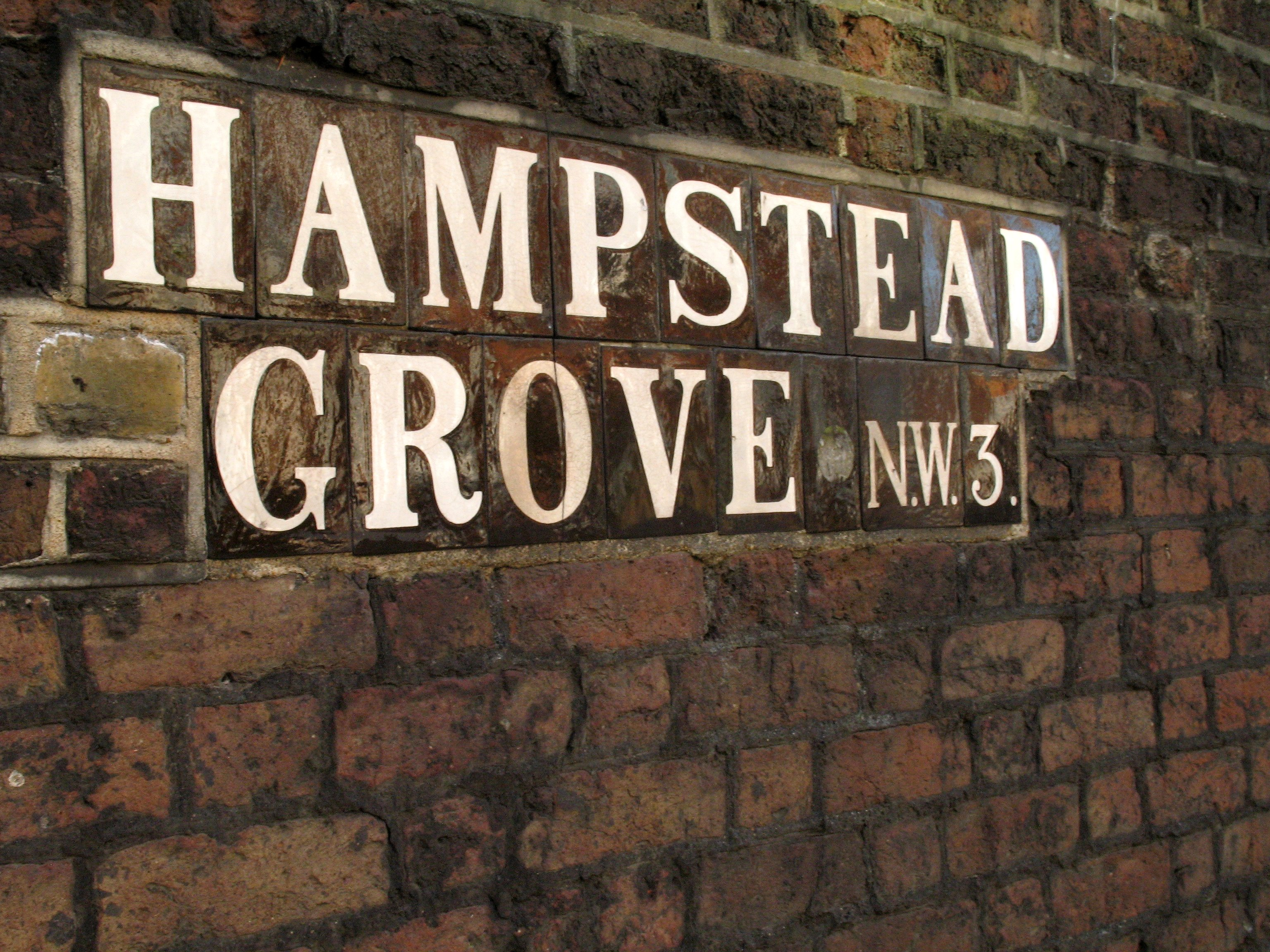
Old street sign.

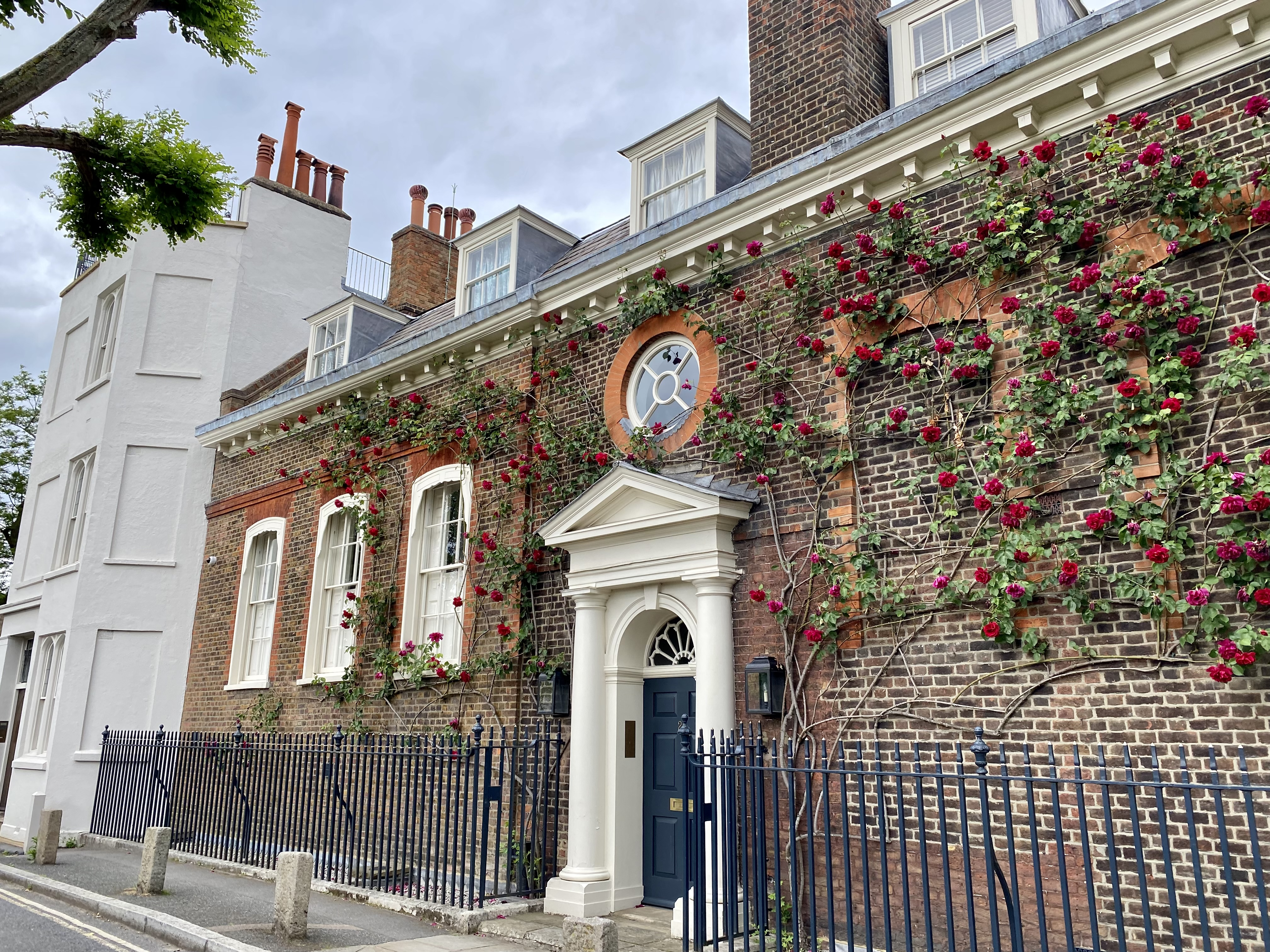
Old Grove House

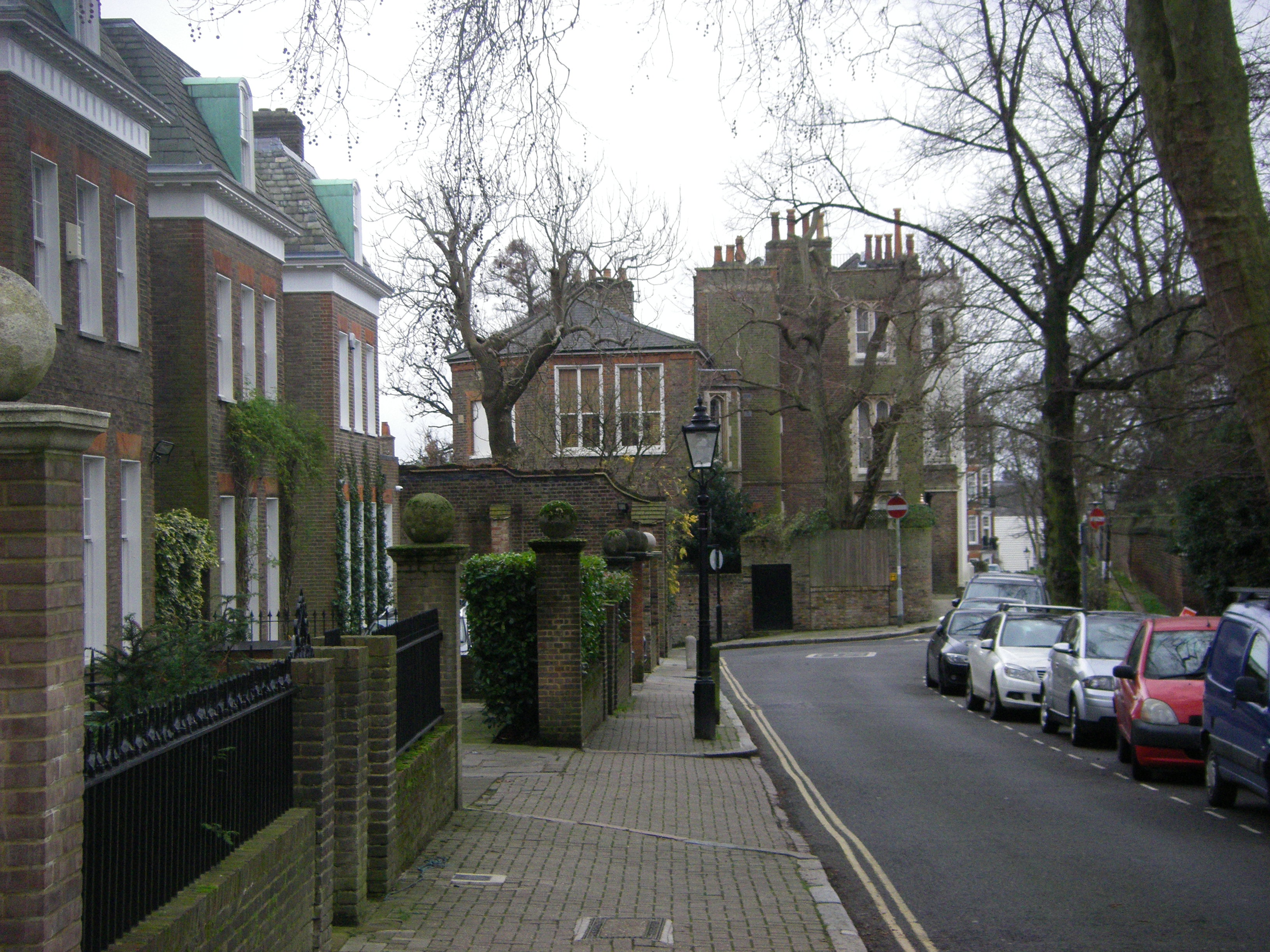
Northern section of the street

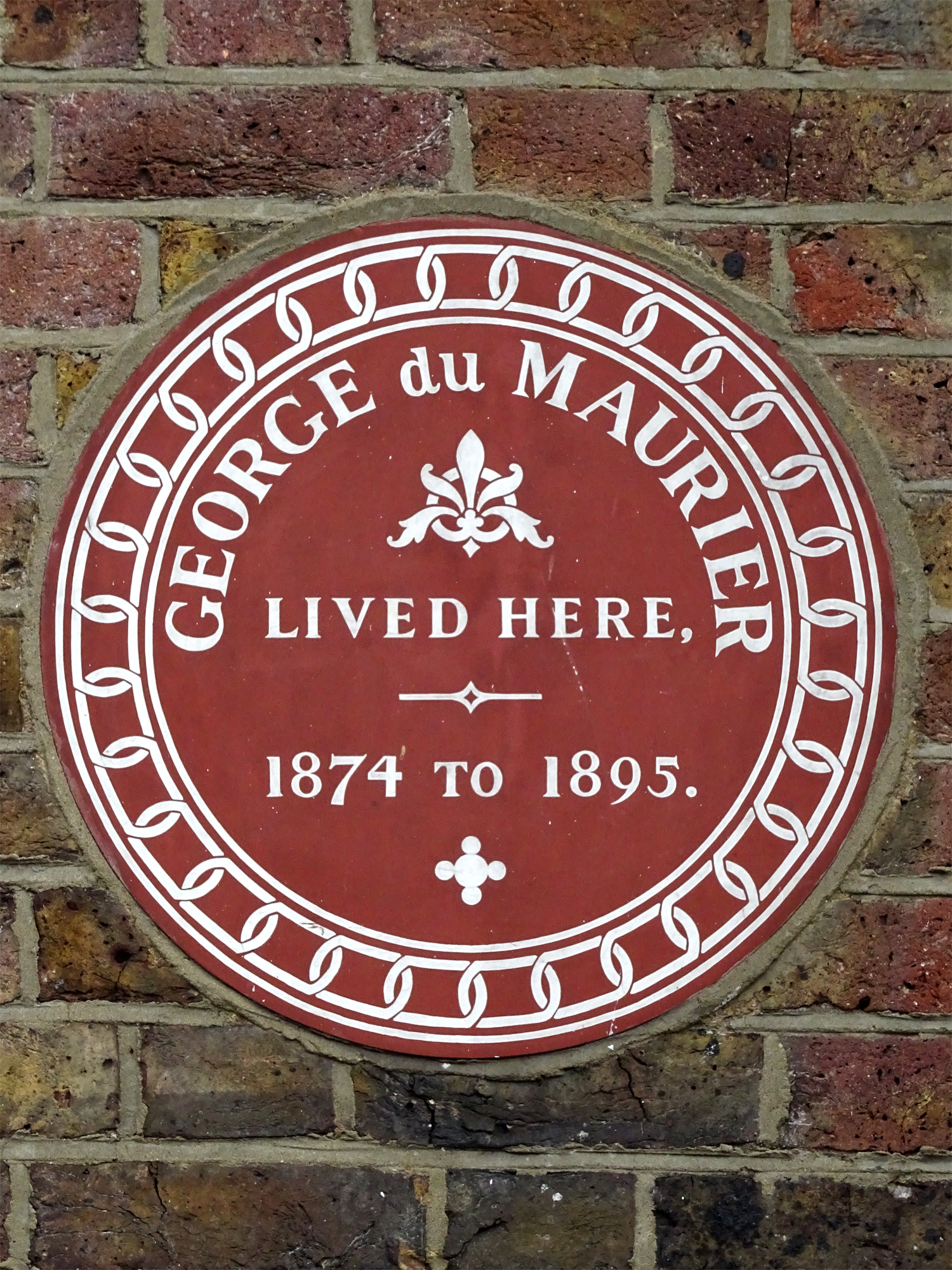
Plaque commemorating the writer George du Maurier

Hampstead Grove is a street in Hampstead in the London Borough of Camden. It heads northwards from Holly Hill running towards Hampstead Heath, but curving back towards Lower Terrace which connects it to the Heath. It runs roughly parallel to Heath Street to its east. It takes its name from the groves of trees that marked the landscape.

The first reference to the street is in 1831, when it was known as The Grove (a name that also at times included Admiral's Walk and Upper and Lower Terrace). In 1937, to avoid confusion with The Grove in Highgate, the name was changed to Hampstead Grove. One of Hampstead's two historic windmills was located here. It contains a large number of eighteenth and nineteenth century properties. The Grade I Fenton House, now belonging to the National Trust, is on the west side of the road and is the oldest surviving mansion in Hampstead dating back to 1693. Other listed buildings include Old Grove House and New Grove House. Notable residents have included the writer George du Maurier, his son the actor Gerald du Maurier, the artist Brian Robb, the novelist Mary Webb and Lord Cottesloe.

Near its northern end is a concealed reservoir, dating back to 1856 and drawing its water from nearby Whitestone Pond, and Hampstead Observatory.

== Bibliography ==
- Bebbington, Gillian. London Street Names. Batsford, 1972.
- Cherry, Bridget & Pevsner, Nikolaus. London 4: North. Yale University Press, 2002.
- Wade, Christopher. The Streets of Hampstead. Camden History Society, 2000.
