= Thomas Gardnor =

British upholsterer and developer (c. 1685–1775)

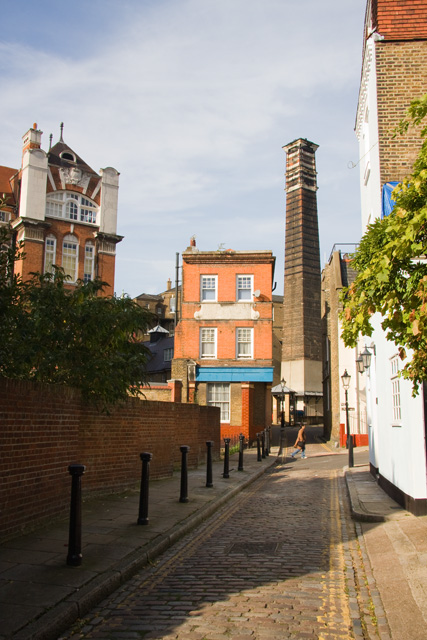
Streatley Place, Hampstead.

Thomas Gardnor (c. 1685–1775) was a City of London upholsterer who was a property owner in Hampstead, London, and the owner of Gardnor House, Hampstead. With his wife and his heirs he was responsible for the development of several streets in the town.

== Early life ==
Thomas Gardnor was born around 1685.

== Hampstead ==
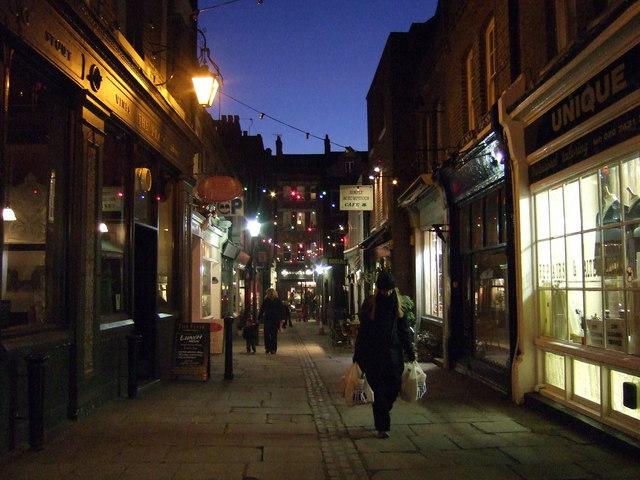
Flask Walk

Thomas Gardnor was a successful upholsterer in the City of London who with his wife was an important property owner in Hampstead, London. In 1749, he bought the house now known as Gardnor House in Flask Walk (built c. 1736). The Gardnors and their descendants gradually enlarged their property holdings in the area to include Flask Walk, Streatley Place and parts of Heath Street, High Street and New End. The family also owned houses in Church Road on the site of Gardnor Mansions. Gardnor House is listed Grade II* on the National Heritage List for England.

Gardnor was a trustee of the Hampstead mineral waters.

== Death ==
Gardnor died in 1775. He is buried at St John-at-Hampstead churchyard in a family grave. The tomb is grade II listed and is the only tomb in the cemetery to mention a smallpox death. His Will is available from the British National Archives.

== Legacy ==
Gardnor Road in Hampstead was built in the gardens of Gardnor House in 1871/72 or the 1880s after the death of the last Thomas Gardnor in 1863.
