= Hampstead Antiquarian and Historical Society =

Local history society in Hampstead, London

The Hampstead Antiquarian and Historical Society was a local history society devoted to the history of Hampstead, London. Founded in 1897, the society first met at Hampstead Town Hall. The group was active until at least 1940 and published a journal known as the Transactions of the Hampstead Antiquarian and Historical Society.

== Members and officers ==
The first president of the society was Sir Walter Besant. Local historians Thomas Barratt and George William Potter were members. Richard Garnett (1835 – 1906) was president. In 1922, Andrew Thomas Taylor was president.
