= Hampstead High Street =

Street in London, England

Coordinates: 51.556°N 0.177°W

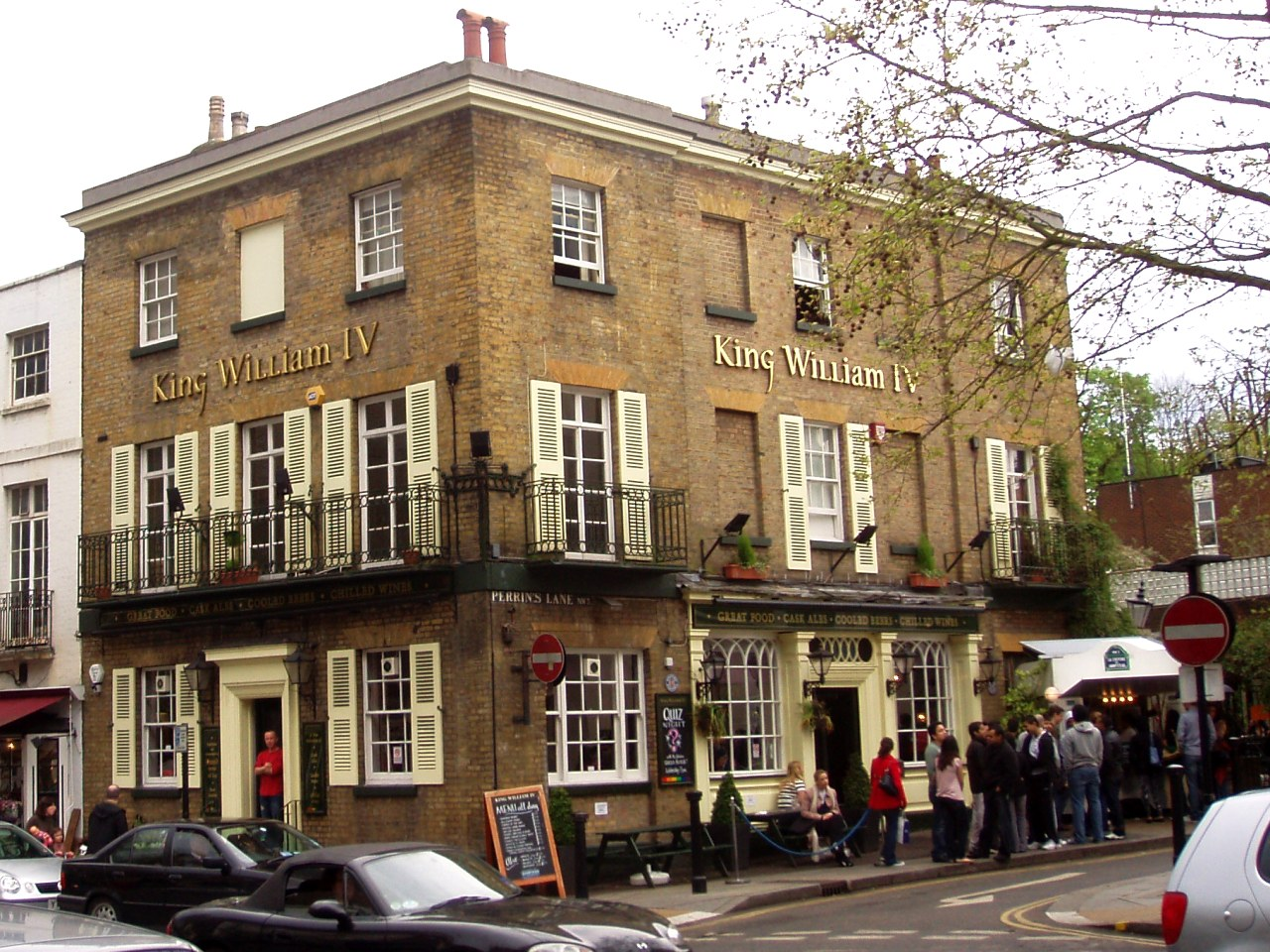
William IV pub in the High Street

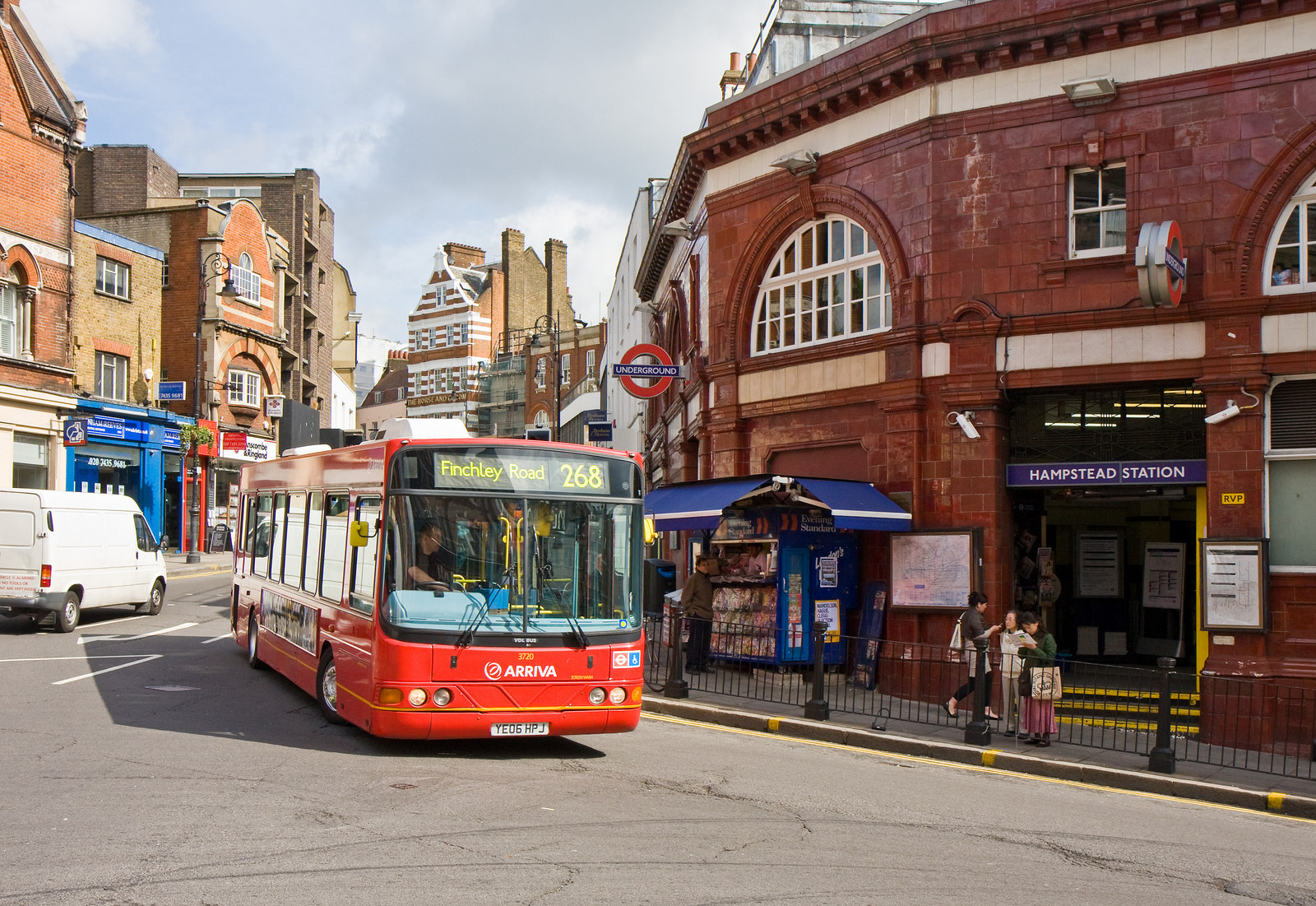
Hampstead tube station at the junction with Heath Street

Hampstead High Street is located in the London Borough of Camden. It is the main high street for Hampstead Village and is part of the A502. Heading southeastwards from a junction with Heath Street and Holly Hill by Hampstead tube station it runs downhill and features a number of pubs, restaurants and shops before becoming Rosslyn Hill which connects it further on to Haverstock Hill, the whole stretch of which was one called Hampstead Road. Streets and alleys running off it include Flask Walk, Perrin Court and Prince Arthur Road.

It is based on an ancient route and was known in the fifteenth century as Kingswell Street after the wells that supplied water for the village and was later called Hampstead Hill. Many nearby developments took place in the late seventeenth century and early eighteenth century when the fashionable Hampstead Wells were at their height. The top end was widened in the late nineteenth century leading to the demolition of many alleyways and courtyards. In 1907 the Northern Line Edgware extension built its surface station on the former Minerva Court site.

In 1835 the old King's Head pub was renamed the William IV after the reigning monarch William IV rode up Haverstock Hill to visit Ken Wood on the Heath. Stanfield House was the home of the Romantic landscape painter Clarkson Stanfield from 1847 to 1865.

== Bibliography ==
- Bebbington, Gillian. London Street Names. Batsford, 1972.
- Cherry, Bridget & Pevsner, Nikolaus. London 4: North. Yale University Press, 2002.
- Wade, Christopher. The Streets of Hampstead. Camden History Society, 2000.
- Weinreb, Ben, Hibbert, Christopher, Keay, John & Keay, Julia. The London Encyclopaedia. Macmillan, 2010.
