= Fenton House, Hampstead =

17th-century house with walled garden

Fenton House
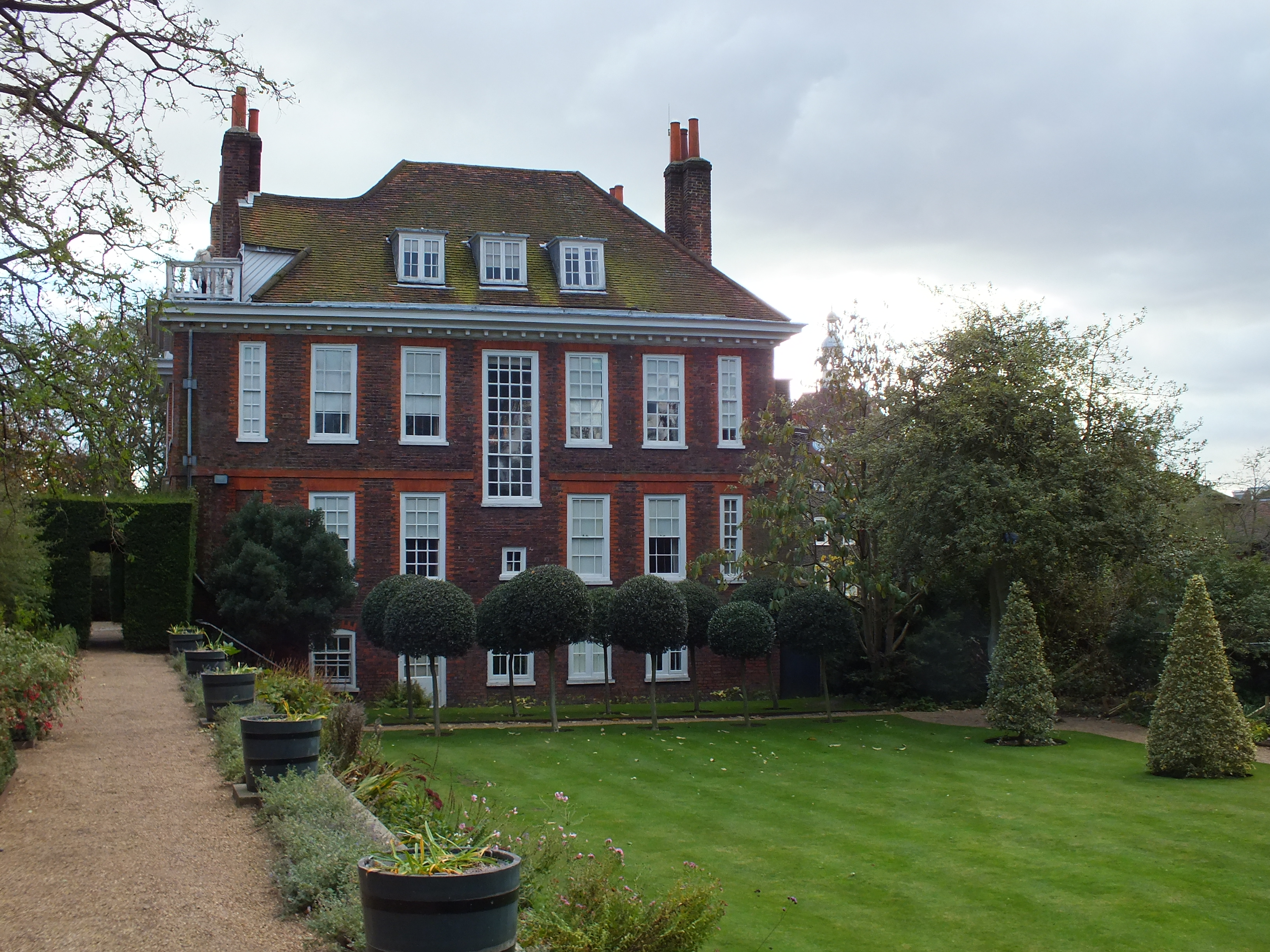

- Location within London Borough of Camden
- Former names: Ostend House (early C18); Clock House (later C18)

General information
- Type: Merchant's house
- Architectural style: Georgian architecture with many slightly earlier core features
- Location: Hampstead (village); London, NW3; United Kingdom
- Coordinates: 51°33′32.01″N 0°10′46.85″W
- Completed: 1693
- Owner: National Trust

Technical details
- Material: Brick
- Floor count: 4

Design and construction
- Designations: Grade I listed

Fenton House is a 17th-century merchant's house in Hampstead in North London which belongs to the National Trust, bequeathed to them in 1952 by Lady Binning, its last owner and resident. It is a detached house with a walled garden, which is large by London standards, and features a sunken garden, an orchard and a kitchen garden. (Note: The plot is 1 acre (0.40 ha); its tree-lined is driveway one tenth and the house occupies 0.05 acres) It is located on the western side of Hampstead Grove and to the south of Admiral's Walk with its entrance on Holly Hill.

== Features ==
The interior houses the Benton Fletcher collection of early keyboard instruments, some of which are often played for visitors during operational hours, and collections of paintings (including the collection of Peter Barkworth paintings), Meissen, English and Chinese porcelain, 17th-century needlework pictures and Georgian furniture.

It also has fine portraits of King William IV (when Duke of Clarence) and his mistress Dorothea Jordan, as well as portraits of two of their illegitimate sons, Lord Frederick FitzClarence and Lord Adolphus FitzClarence, and one of William IV's brother George IV.

The brick mansion, with 1693 inscribed on its chimney breast which is consistent with the date of its core and most of its walls, has a 300-year-old orchard, where around 30 varieties of apple trees flourish.

19th century remodelling by a Riga merchant

Philip Fenton, a Riga merchant, bought the house in 1793 and in the 19th century ordered much of the remodelling. This comprised alterations to the interiors and roof, the addition of an ornate portico and the pediment, new window frames and glazing. The sides of the building feature balustraded flat areas (parapets) above the standard decorative ledge (cornice) which date from the 18th century.

The building has original staircases with twisted balusters. Main rooms have original panelling, corner cupboards and decoratively carved marble fireplaces.

Small west projection

It has a west extension adding no more than 5% to the building dating to about 1936, believed in the listing research of 1950 to have been commissioned by Lady Binning.

== Gallery ==
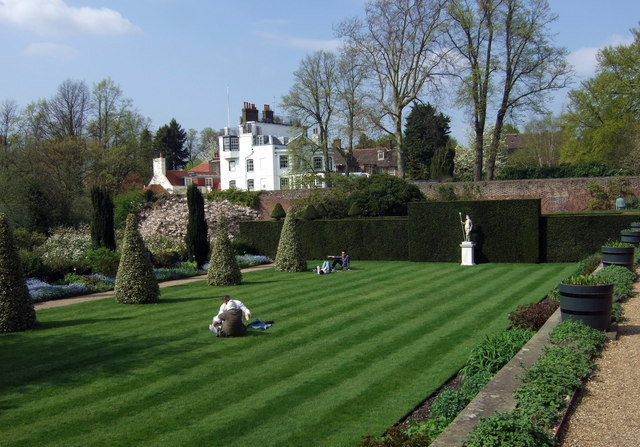

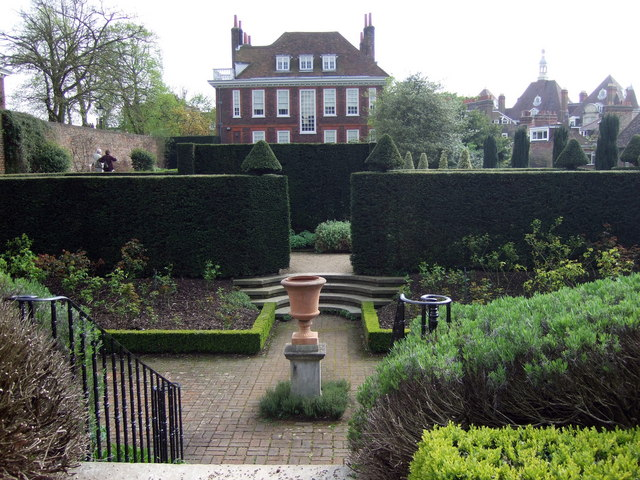

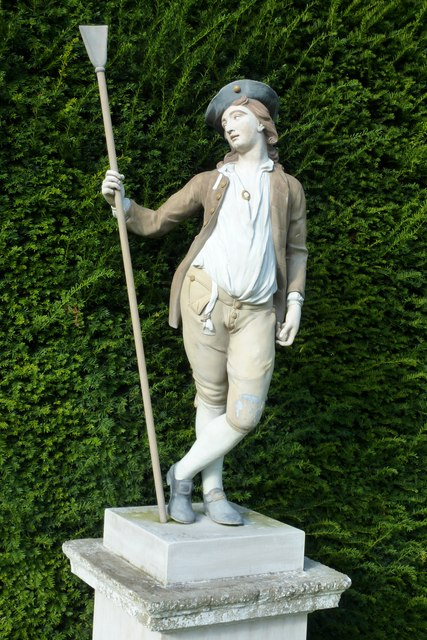

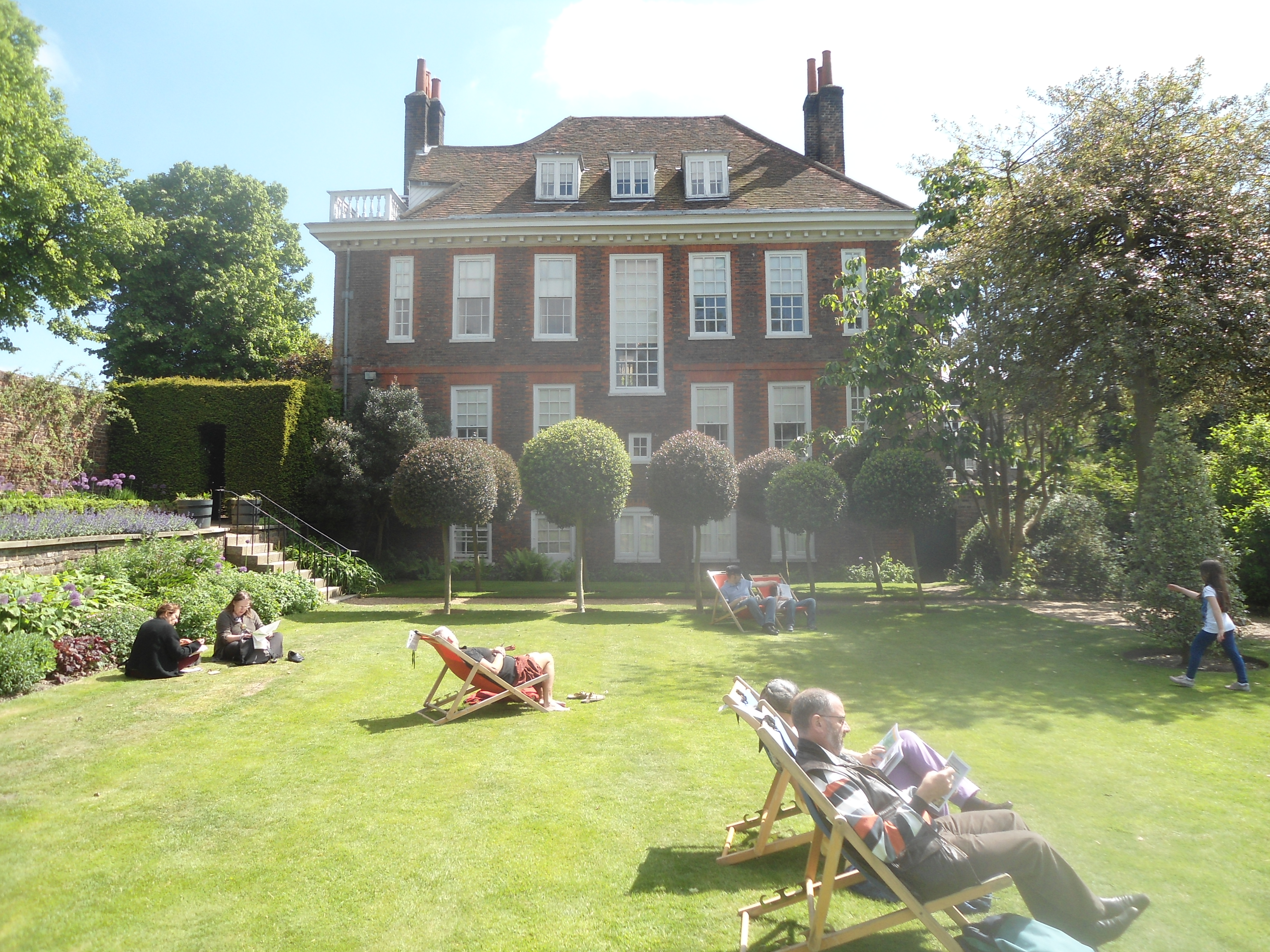
