= Belsize Park tube station =

London Underground station

Belsize Park
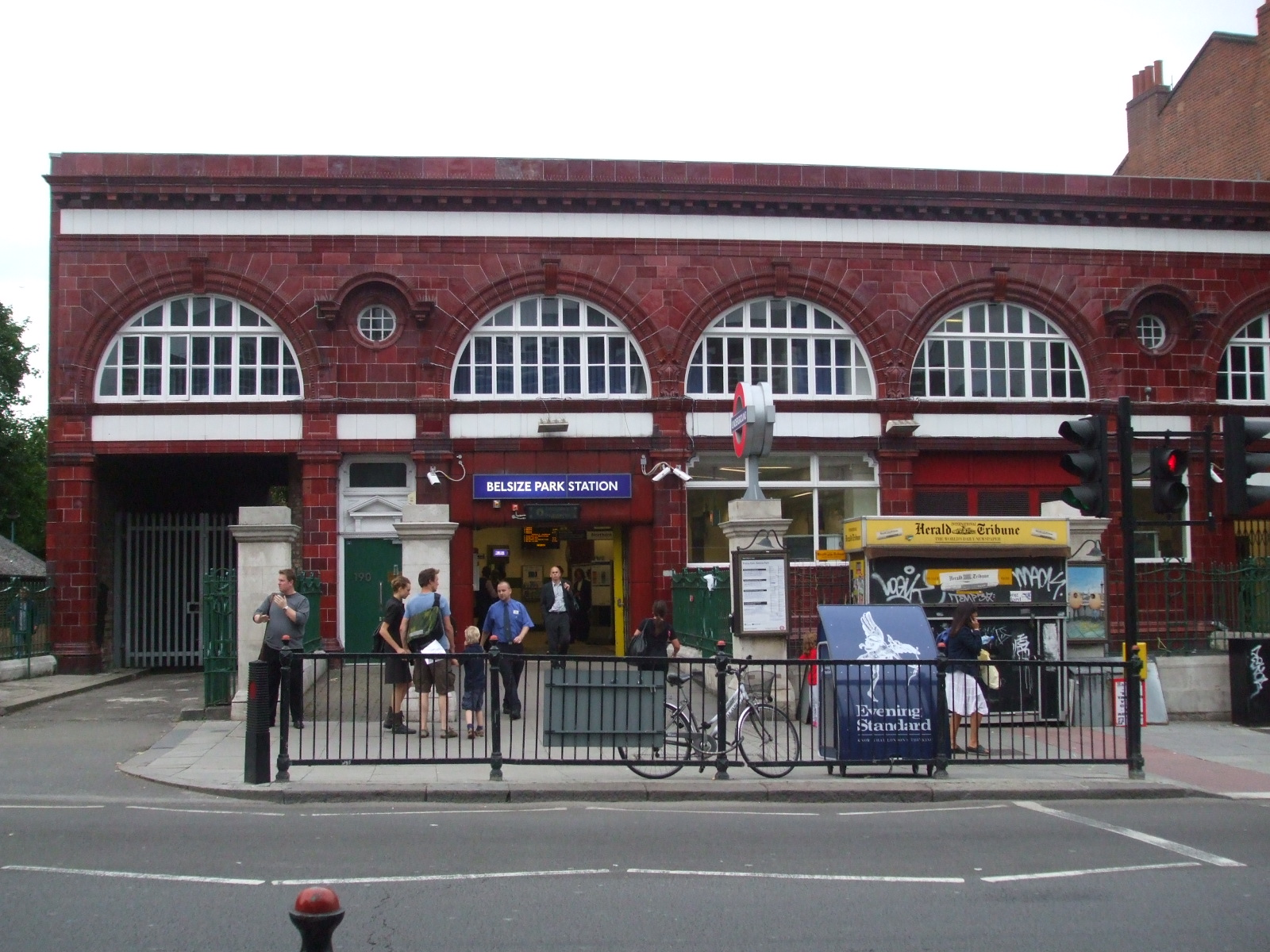
- Belsize Park station
- Interactive map of Belsize Park

General information
- Location: Belsize Park
- Local authority: London Borough of Camden
- Managed by: London Underground
- Number of platforms: 2
- Fare zone: 2

London Underground annual entry and exit
- 2021: ▼2.61 million
- 2022: ▲4.59 million
- 2023: ▲5.02 million
- 2024: ▲5.05 million
- 2025: ▲5.09 million

Railway companies
- Original company: Charing Cross, Euston and Hampstead Railway

Key dates
- 22 June 1907: Station opened

Listed status
- Listing grade: II
- Entry number: 1401089
- Added to list: 20 July 2011; 14 years ago

Other information
- External links: TfL station info page
- Coordinates: 51.55028°N 0.16444°W

Belsize Park (/ˈbɛlsaɪz ˈpɑːrk/) is a London Underground station in Belsize Park, in the London Borough of Camden. It is on the Edgware branch of the Northern line, between Hampstead and Chalk Farm stations. It is in London fare zone 2.

The station stands at the northern end of Haverstock Hill. In July 2011 it became a Grade II listed building. The Royal Free Hospital is located a short distance to the north of the station.

== History ==
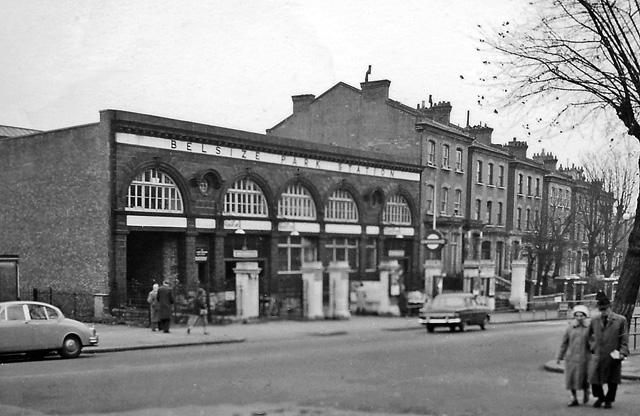
Station entrance in 1960

The station was opened on 22 June 1907 by the Charing Cross, Euston & Hampstead Railway as an intermediate station on its line from Charing Cross to Golders Green. It is served by three lifts which descend 33.2 metres (109 ft) to the platforms. The platforms can also be reached by stairs. The sign at the top of the stairs lists the total step count between train and platform level of 209, while the sign at the bottom only mentions 189, the remaining 20 being between the bottom landing of the lifts and the platforms.

The station was designed by Leslie Green in "Modern Style" and has his familiar facade of ox-blood faience with five round arched windows. It remained largely untouched until the late 1980s when the lifts were replaced and a new ticketing system installed.

It was previously the site of the Trewint Industrial Home for Girls.

== Deep-level air-raid shelter ==
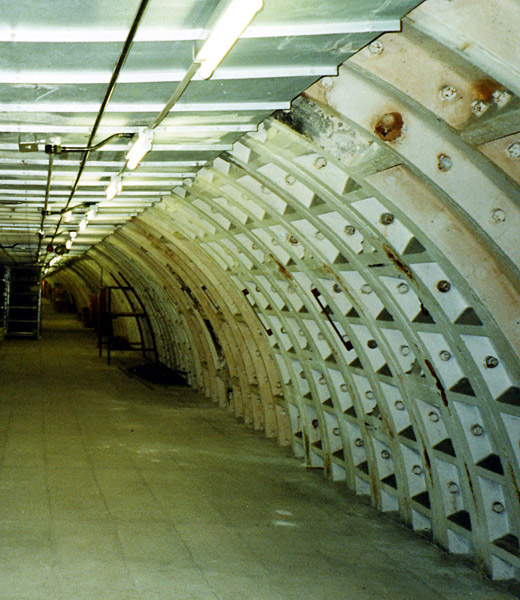
Belsize Park deep level shelter

Belsize Park is one of eight London Underground stations which have deep-level air-raid shelters underneath them. The shelter was constructed in World War II to provide safe accommodation for service personnel. Entrances to the shelter are at the junction of Haverstock Hill and Downside Crescent and off Haverstock Hill.

== Connections ==
London Buses routes 168 and C11 and night route N5 serve the station.

== In popular culture ==
The staircase at Belsize Park tube station is the scene of the eponymous homicide in Mavis Doriel Hay's 1934 murder mystery novel Murder Underground.

Preceding station	London Underground	Following station
Hampstead towards Edgware	Northern line Edgware branch	Chalk Farm towards Battersea Power Station, Morden or Kennington
