= Upper Flask =

18th-century tavern in Hampstead

Coordinates: 51.5607°N 0.1788°W

The building in an engraving by Charles John Smith for his Graphic Illustrations of the Life and Times of Samuel Johnson, LL.D. in 1837, when it was known as the residence of Johnson's collaborator, the late George Steevens.

The Upper Flask was a tavern near the top of Hampstead hill in the 18th century which sold flasks of water from the spa at Hampstead Wells. It was located in Heath Street. It was the summer meeting place of the great literary and political figures of the Kit-Kat Club such as Walpole. The tavern business ceased in the 1750s and the grand house subsequently became the private residence of ladies and gentlemen such as Lady Charlotte Rich, George Steevens and Thomas Sheppard.

== Spa and tavern ==
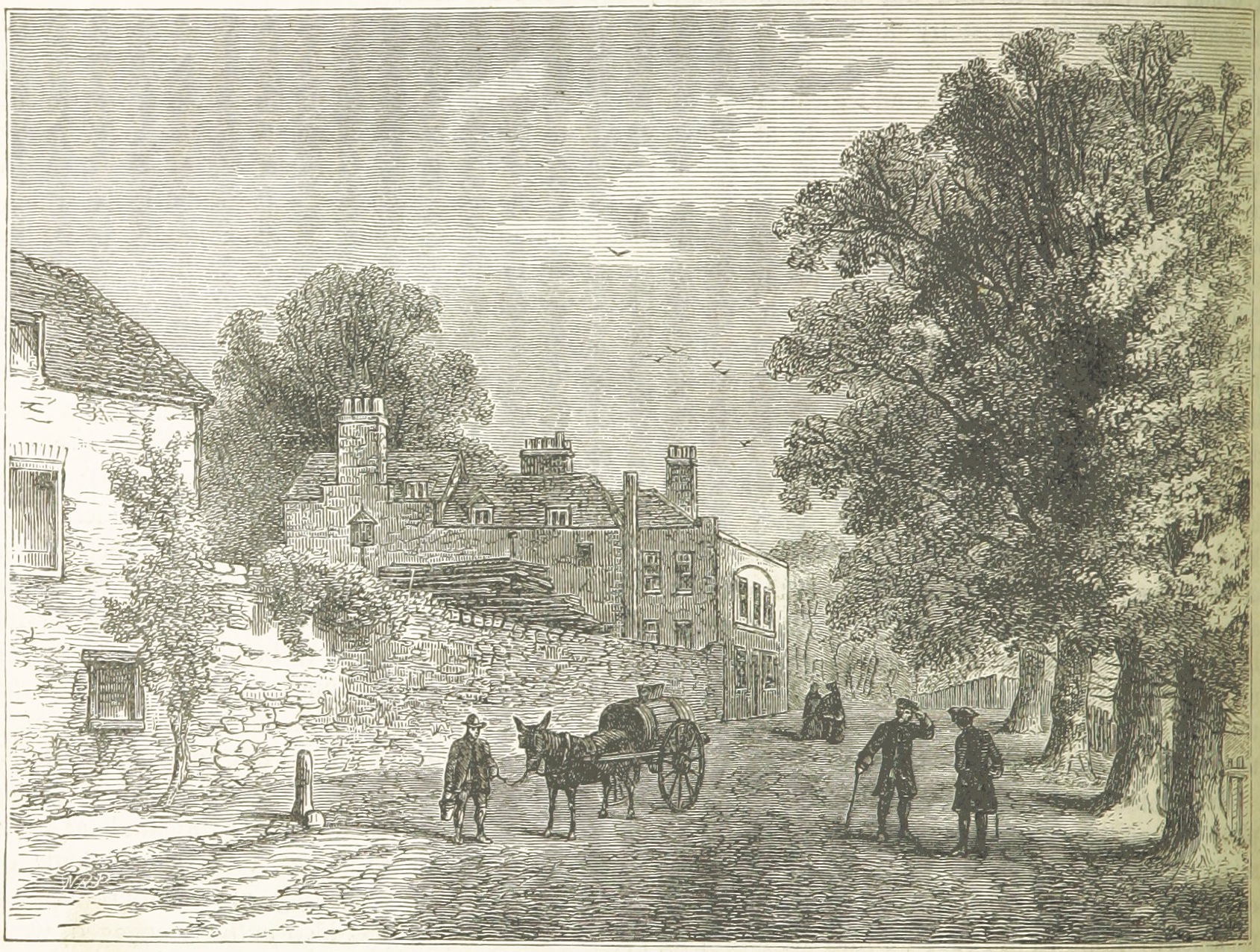
The Upper Flask, about 1800

It took its name from the flasks of spring water which were sold there, like the Lower Flask and The Flask in nearby Highgate. The Upper Flask was the most select of these, being in a grand Jacobean house near the summit of Hampstead hill, where it commanded good views of London and the surrounding villages. It was patronised by Whig grandees and literati who attended the famous Kit-Kat Club and removed its summer meetings to the "Upper FlasK". Later, the company included John Keats, Leigh Hunt and Percy Bysshe Shelley. They would drink their ale under an old mulberry tree in the grounds and one of the members, Sir Richard Blackmore, wrote:

Or when, Apollo-like, thou'st pleased to lead
Thy sons to feast on Hampstead's airy head:
Hampstead, that, towering in superior sky,
Now with Parnassus does in honour vie.

The Upper Flask appears in the popular novel, Clarissa, written by Samuel Richardson, in 1748. The eponymous heroine stays there while seeking to escape from the villain Lovelace, who threatens her virtue.

== Private residence ==
The building as sketched by Frederick Adcock, around 1912.

In the 1750s, the proprietor Samuel Stanton, died. The property went to his relations who used it as a private house known as Upper Bowling Green House after the nearby bowling green. Subsequent residents included Lady Charlotte Rich, daughter of the Earl of Warwick; the writer and practical joker, George Steevens; and the MP for Frome, Thomas Sheppard. Steevens bought the place in 1771 and lived there until his death in 1800. His magnum opus during this time was his fifteen-volume edition of Shakespeare's plays which was published in 1793. He worked on this in a concentrated effort for about 18 months, commuting each day by foot from Hampstead to Isaac Reed's offices at Staple Inn. At this time, the house was fenced in and its grounds included a fine lawn and pleasant trees.

Eventually, the site was donated by Lord Leverhulme for Queen Mary's Maternity Home which was constructed in place of the old building and opened there in 1922.
