= Heath Street, Hampstead =

Street in London, England

Coordinates: 51.55901°N 0.18041°W

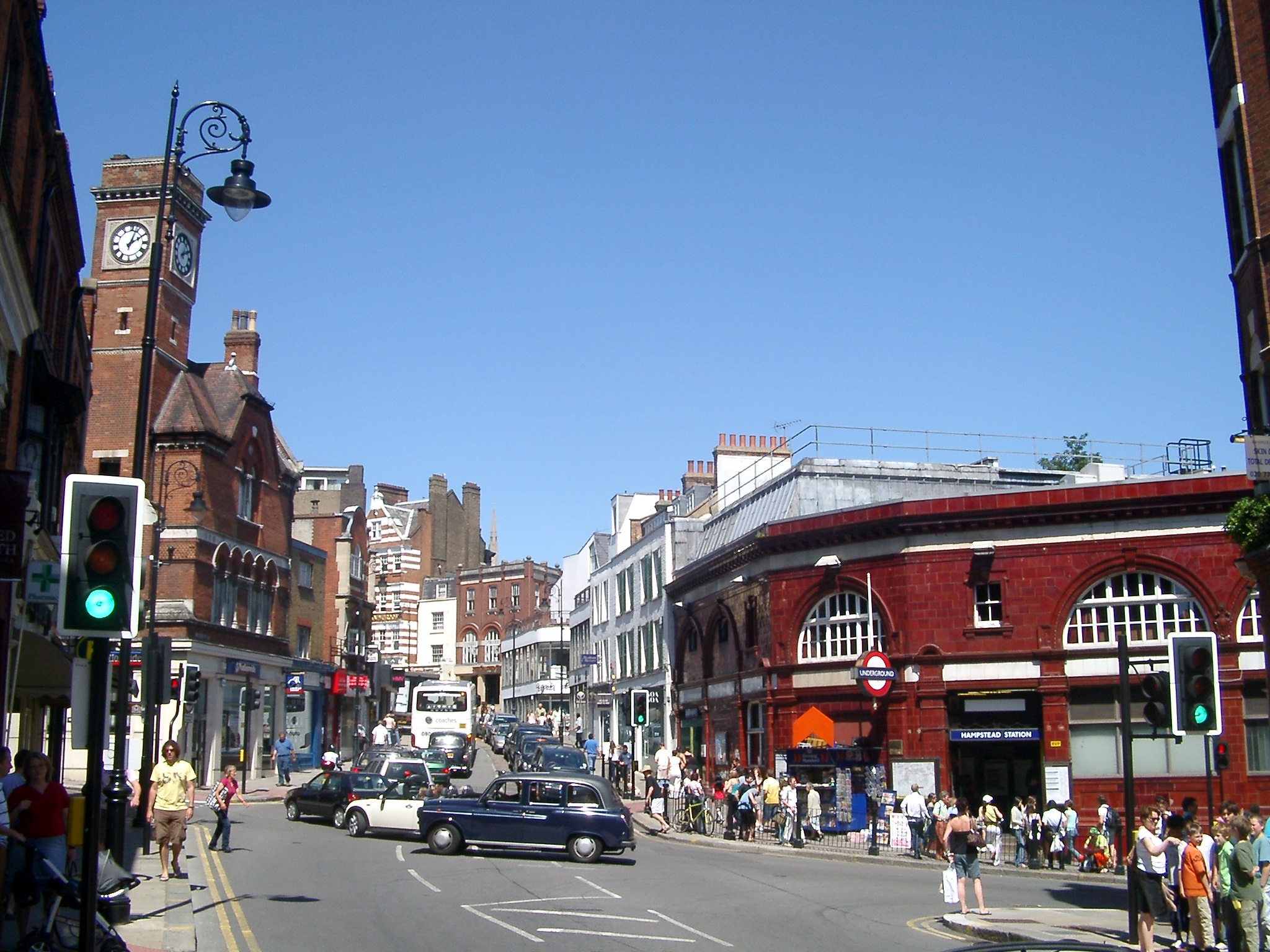
Hampstead tube station at the junction with Hampstead High Street

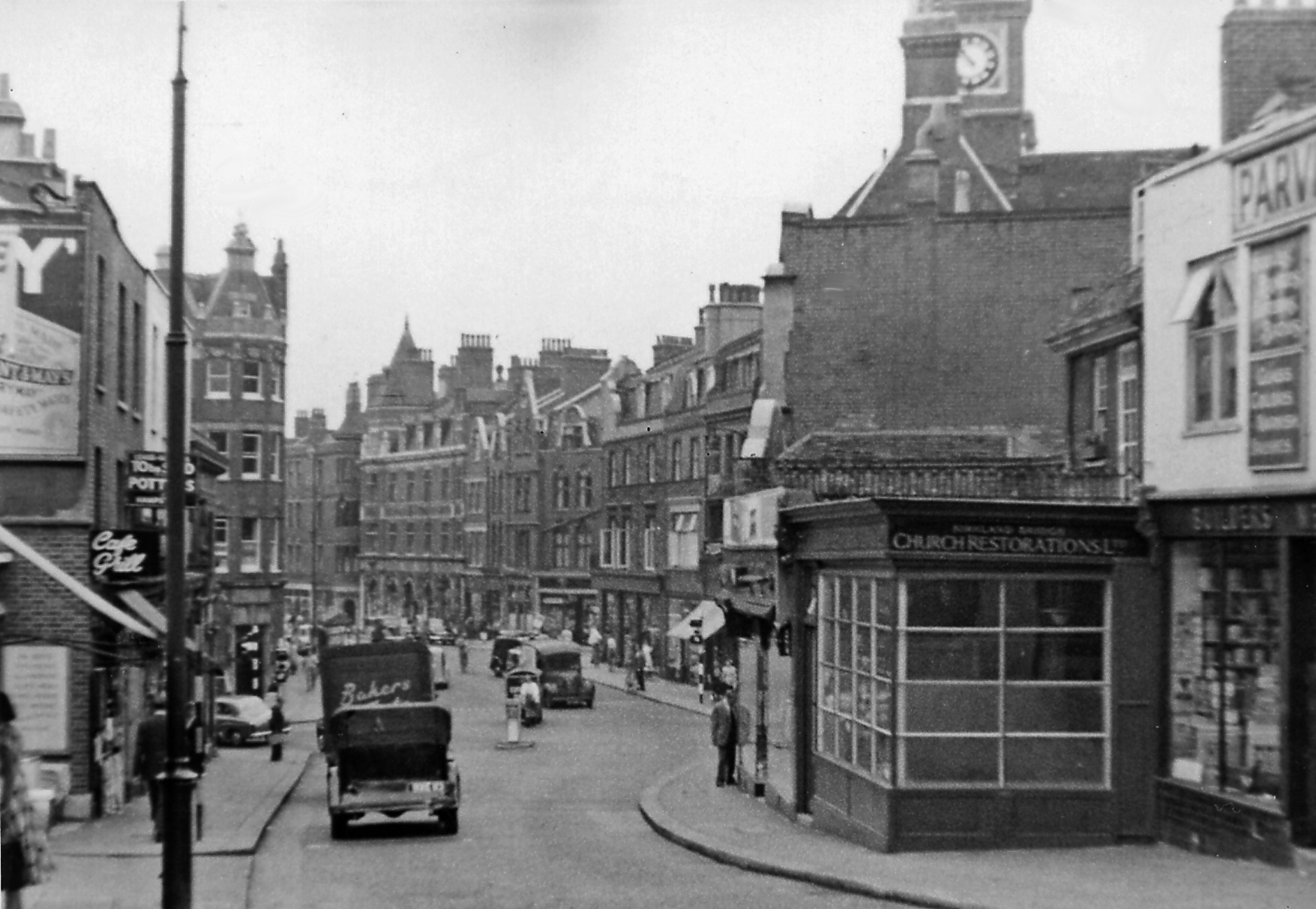
Southern end of the street in 1955

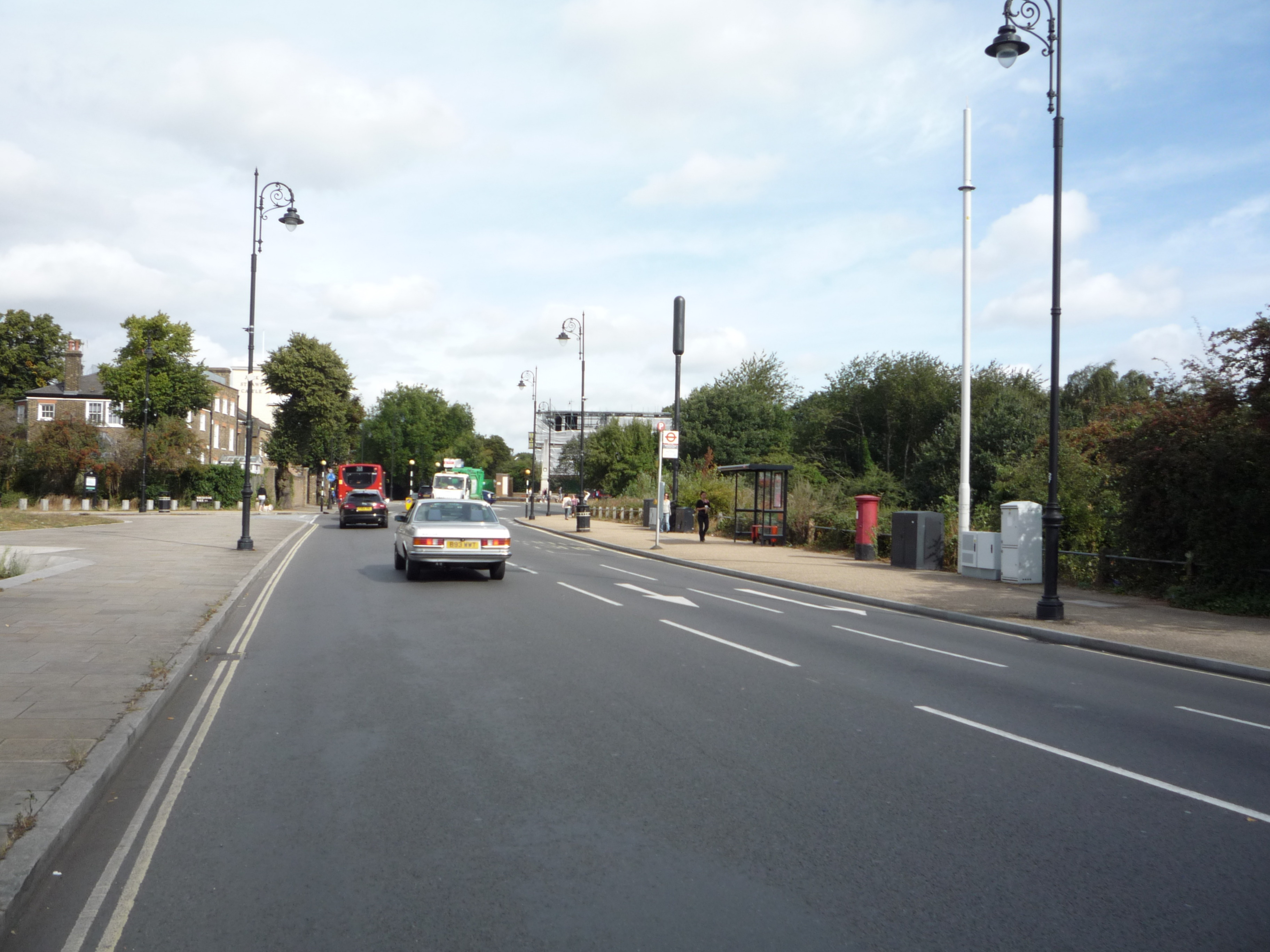
Northern end of the street by Hampstead Heath

View of Heath Street by Night by John Atkinson Grimshaw, 1882

Heath Street is in Hampstead in the London Borough of Camden, part of the A502 road for much of its route. It runs from the centre of Hampstead Village northwards towards Hampstead Heath. By Jack Straw's Castle it divides into North End Way heading towards North End and Spaniards Road heading towards Hampstead Garden Suburb and Highgate via Hampstead Lane. Streets running off it include Church Row, New End, Holly Hill, Hampstead Grove and Hampstead Square.

At the junction with Hampstead High Street is Hampstead tube station, which was originally planned to be called Heath Street. Some of the tiling at the platform level still bears the original name. The southernmost stretch of the road was developed much later than the rest during the late nineteenth century to connect Heath Street with the newly built Fitzjohns Avenue running to Swiss Cottage. It replaced a number of existing alleys.

Until the early nineteenth century it was known as Heath Mount, a name commemorated by the Heath Mount School. Historically it was the main street in Hampstead. Hampstead became a popular resort for Londoners following the establishment of the Hampstead Wells spa in 1698. The Upper Flask Tavern on Heath Street catered to the traffic and was a meeting place for the Kit Kat Club of the early eighteenth century. The site later became Queen Mary's Maternity Hospital.
