= Hampstead tube station =

London Underground station

Hampstead
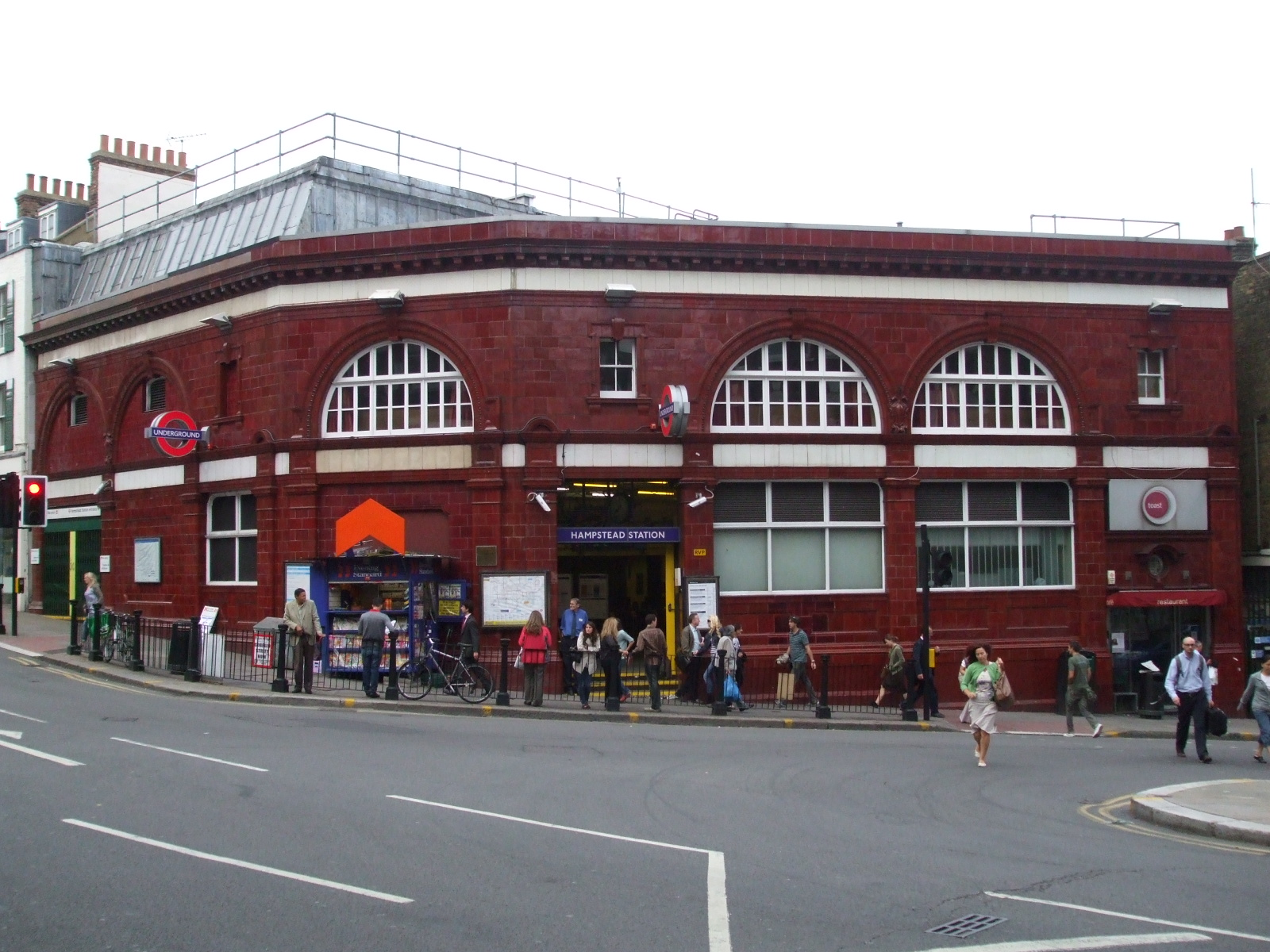
- Station building
- Interactive map of Hampstead

General information
- Location: Hampstead
- Local authority: London Borough of Camden
- Managed by: London Underground
- Number of platforms: 2
- Fare zone: 2 and 3

London Underground annual entry and exit
- 2021: ▼2.11 million
- 2022: ▲3.61 million
- 2023: ▲3.89 million
- 2024: ▲3.94 million
- 2025: ▲4.16 million

Railway companies
- Original company: CCE&HR

Key dates
- 22 June 1907: Opened

Other information
- External links: TfL station info page
- Coordinates: 51.5569°N 0.1783°W

Hampstead is a London Underground station in Hampstead. It is on the Edgware branch of the Northern line, between Golders Green and Belsize Park stations. The branch's northernmost subterranean station, it is on the boundary between London fare zone 2 and zone 3.

Designed by architect Leslie Green, it was opened on 22 June 1907 by the Charing Cross, Euston & Hampstead Railway. As it is at the junction of Heath Street and Hampstead High Street, the name Heath Street was proposed before opening, and the original tiled signs on the platform walls still read Heath Street.

Because Hampstead is on a steep hill, the station's platforms are the deepest on the London Underground network, being 58.5 metres (192 ft) below ground level; and it has the deepest lift shaft on the Underground, at 55 metres (180 ft). Its high-speed lifts, originally manufactured by Otis, were modernised by the Wadsworth Lift Company, and again in 2014 by Accord.

To the north, between Hampstead and Golders Green stations, is the uncompleted North End or Bull & Bush station. London Overground's Hampstead Heath station on the North London line is a 10–15 minute walk east on South End Road.

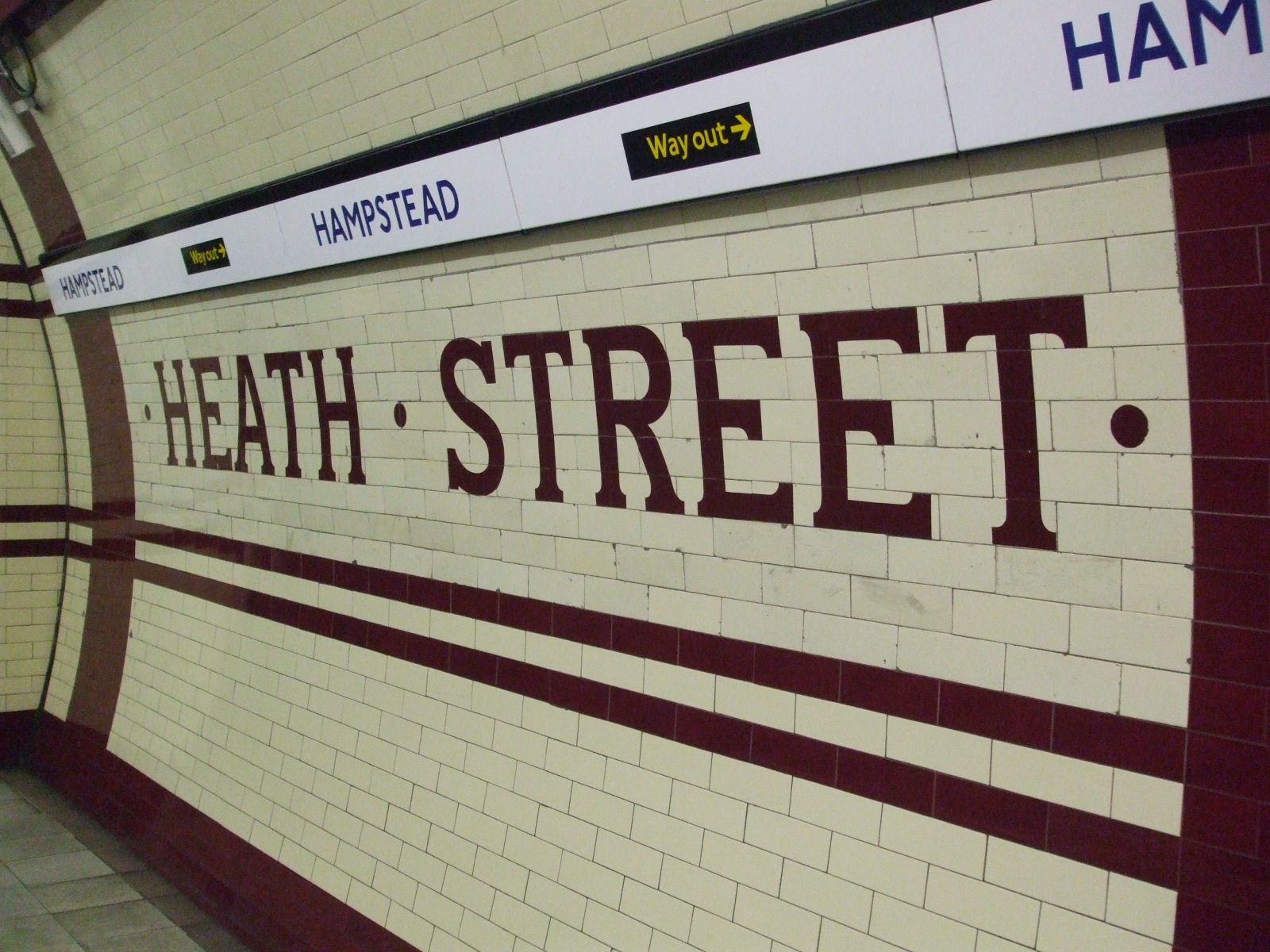
Tiling on the southbound platform, showing the original proposed name, "Heath Street"

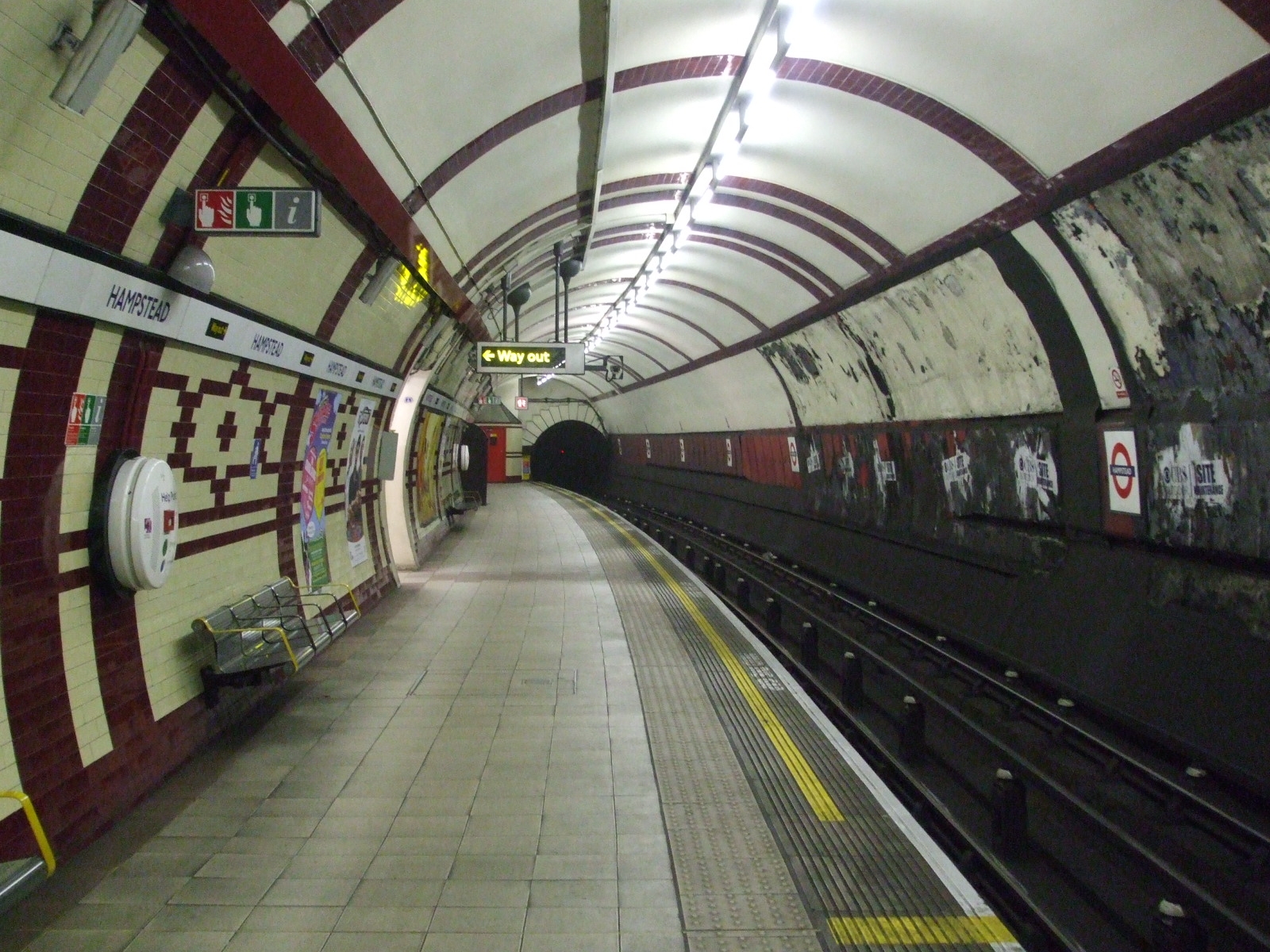
Northbound platform looking south

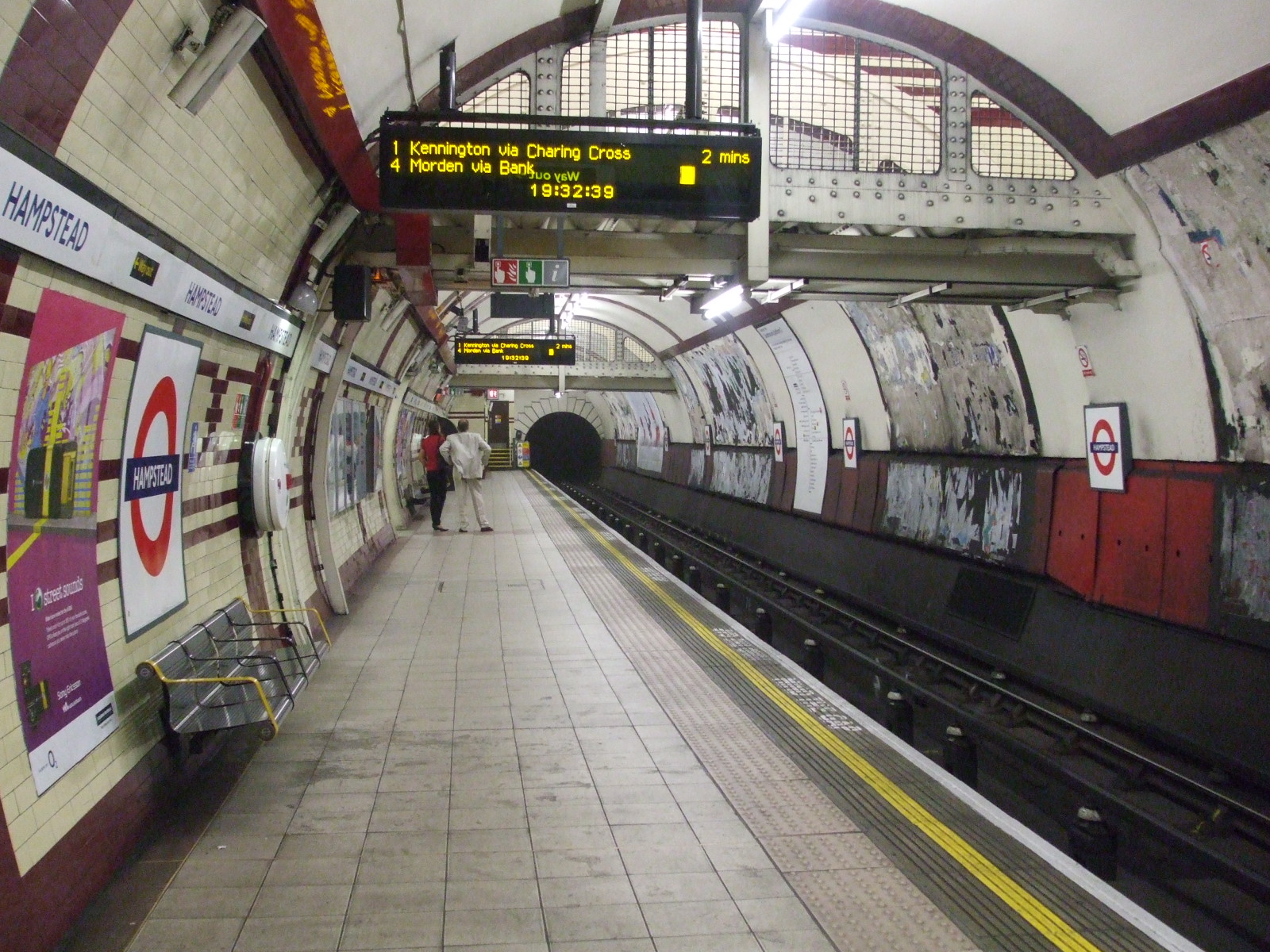
Southbound platform looking north

== Connections ==
London Buses routes 46 and 268, schools service 603 and night bus N5 serve the station.

Preceding station	London Underground	Following station
Golders Green towards Edgware	Northern line Edgware branch	Belsize Park towards Battersea Power Station, Morden or Kennington
Abandoned plans
North End towards Golders Green	Northern line	Belsize Park towards Charing Cross
