= Gardnor House =

Coordinates: 51°33′27″N 0°10′31″W

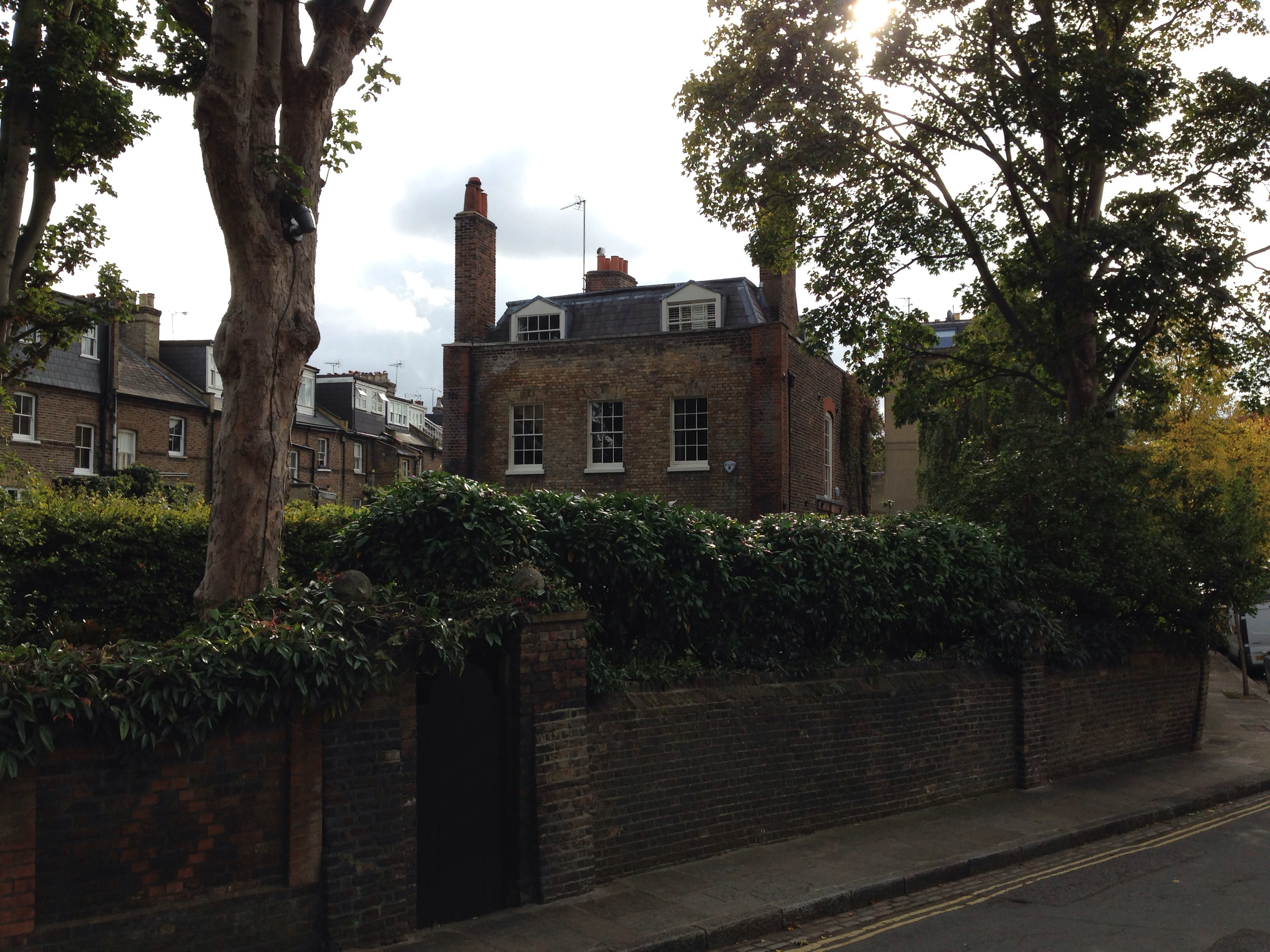
Gardnor House in 2016

Gardnor House is a house in Hampstead in the London Borough of Camden at the junction of Flask Walk and Gardnor Road. It has been listed Grade II* on the National Heritage List for England (NHLE) since August 1950.

It was built for Thomas Gardnor around 1736. The house is set over 3 storeys with an attic. It is made from yellow stock brick and is 4,600 sq ft in size. It was refronted to the back and front in the early 19th century. It has a mansard roof with tall chimney stacks in brick. One of the original rain-water heads and pipes in lead is inscribed 1736. The interior has an original 18th century staircase with turned balusters, carved brackets and column newels. The house retains some original door cases and most rooms feature fireplaces, door cases and cornices from the early 19th century.

In the 1850s Gardnor House was occupied by a dealer in china porcelain and by the 1880s, an architect. The stained glass painter Henry Holiday bought the house in the 1890s.

The writers Kingsley Amis and Elizabeth Jane Howard moved to the house in 1977. Howard later left Amis and the house was sold in 1981.

A photograph of Gardnor House by John Gay is in the collection of the Hampstead Museum at nearby Burgh House.

Gardnor House was put up for sale in January 2019 for £12 million and sold for £10.8 million in October 2019.
