= The Holly Bush, Hampstead =

Pub in Hampstead, London

Coordinates: 51°33′28.1″N 0°10′45.5″W

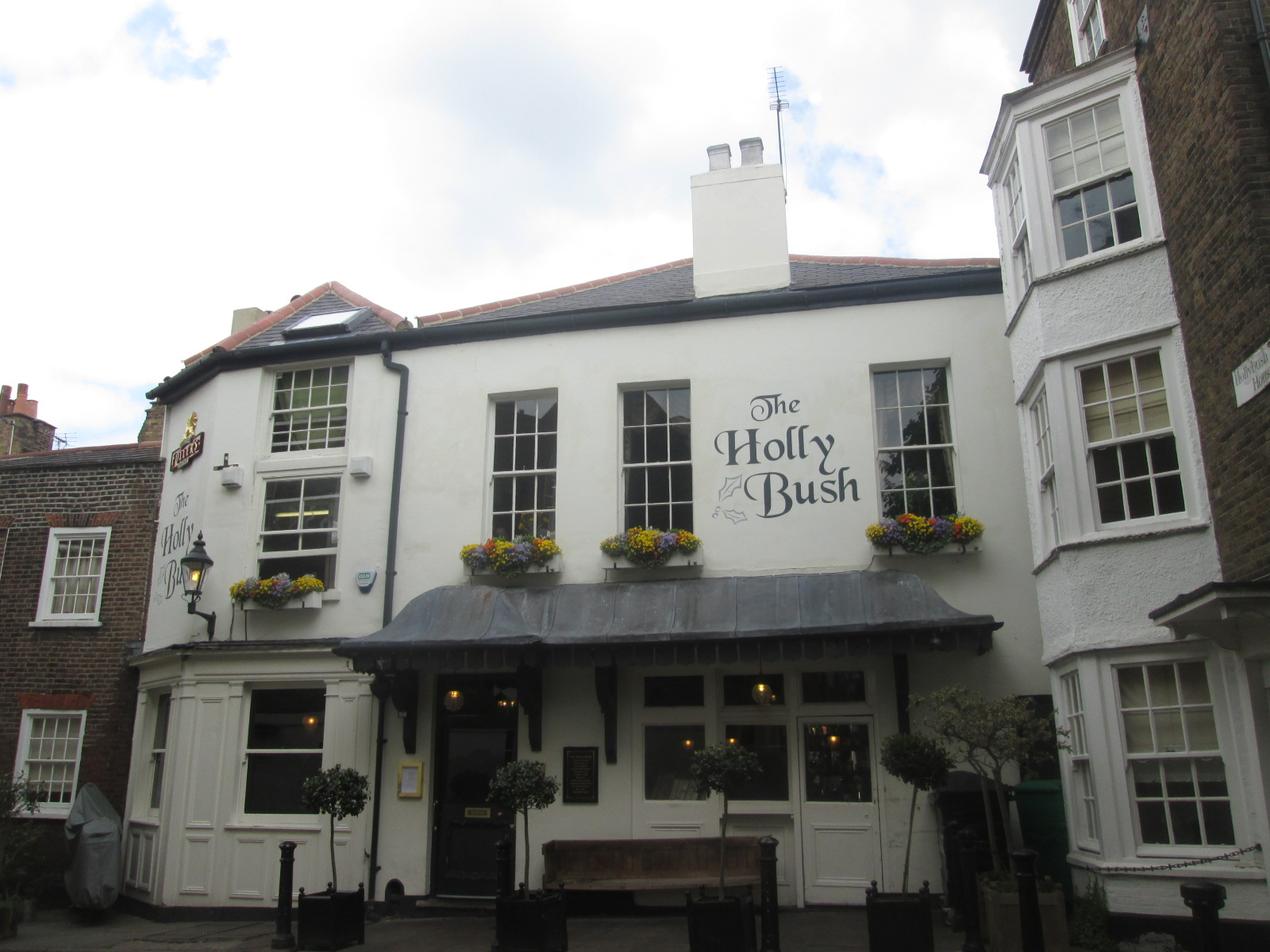
Pictured in 2016

The Holly Bush is a Grade II listed public house in Holly Mount, Hampstead, London, NW3.

The building was originally built as stables for Romney's House in the 1790s and used as the catering wing for the Assembly Rooms in the 19th century, before becoming a pub.

In 2010, it was bought by Fuller's Brewery.

Liam Gallagher and Ariana Grande have been known to frequent the pub.
