= Hampstead Scientific Society =

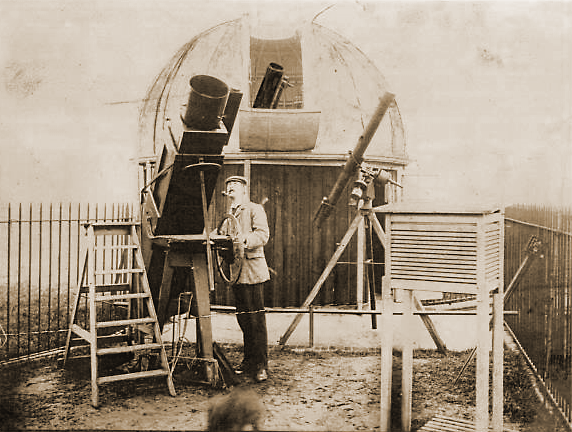
- Patrick Hepburn at the observatory of the Hampstead Scientific Society circa 1910
- Abbreviation: HSS
- Formation: July 1899; 127 years ago
- Legal status: Registered Charity
- Purpose: Science, including Amateur astronomy
- Location: Hampstead, London
- Region served: UK
- Members: Public
- Website: HSS, CATS/ATMoL

The Hampstead Scientific Society (HSS) in north London was founded in July 1899 as the Hampstead Astronomical and General Scientific Society by P.E. Vizard. It aims to be inclusive, promoting and nurturing an interest in all branches of science, while catering for wide levels of knowledge, from layman to expert alike. The society maintains specialist astronomy and meteorology sections and runs a programme of lectures on various scientific topics in the Hampstead area of North West London.

The HSS is a registered charity which is affiliated with the British Science Association and the Richmond Scientific Society. Its President for many years was Professor Heinz Wolff.

== History ==
In 1898 the author of A Guide to Hampstead, P.E.Vizard, learned that a Hampstead resident, Colonel Henry Heberden JP, had a 10.5-inch Newtonian reflecting telescope that he wanted to donate to a Society in order for it to be made available to members of the public. Thus in July 1899, at a public meeting, the Hampstead Astronomical and General Scientific Society was formed.

In 1902 the respected physician, pathologist and biographer Sir Samuel Wilks became the society's president. Following Wilks' retirement, in 1910 Patrick Hepburn of the British Astronomical Association (BAA) joined the society, becoming its joint secretary with Vizard. In 1923 a 6-inch Cooke refracting telescope was presented to the Society by George Avenell and remains the primary telescope in use at the Hampstead Observatory.

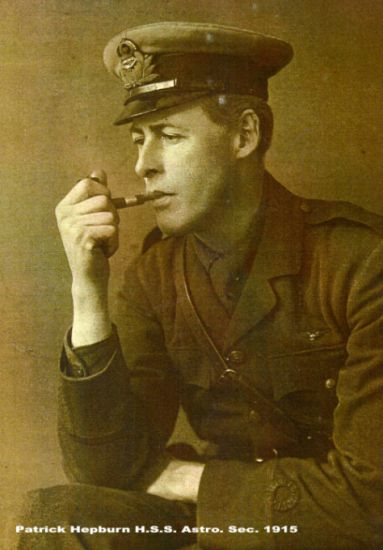
Patrick Hepburn 1915 (HSS Secretary of Astronomy)

== Hampstead Observatory ==
=== History ===
The Observatory's first telescope was a 10.5" Newtonian donated by Henry Heberden, whose act of philanthropy resulted in the founding of the HSS. Patrick Hepburn of the BAA joined the society in 1910, subsequently becoming the Director of the Saturn section of the BAA.

In 1923 a 6-inch Cooke refracting telescope was lent to the Society by George Avenell, it was formally gifted to the society in 1928 and is still the main telescope in use at the observatory today. The date of manufacture of the telescope is unknown, however, it matches the appearance and specification of a "missing" telescope commissioned by the Royal Observatory, Greenwich for the 1874 Transit of Venus Expedition to Hawaii.

Renowned optical instrument maker, and one time JAS president, Henry Wildey was Astronomical Secretary of the HSS from 1946 to 1988. He was responsible for organising the public open nights and maintaining the instruments and building. In 1967 H.N (Ron) Irving was commissioned to overhaul the telescope's mounting, drive and clock, a job he carried out at a highly subsidised rate and was granted honorary life membership as a result of his generosity.

In 1971 Herbert Stark, who was HSS general secretary from 1966 to 1974, set-up a sub-committee, headed by Doug Daniels, to focus on the observatory's repair and maintenance. Civil Engineer Keith Hitchcock was appointed to look after the observatory building's renovation. In order to raise capital for the renovations some of the society's equipment was sold, including a vintage sidereal clock, which was a valuable antique. In addition to the renovation of the observatory's buildings, the Cooke telescope's mount was rebuilt by Terry Pearce, who, due to the observatory's financial constraints, convivially accepted payment through instalments spread over a three-year period.

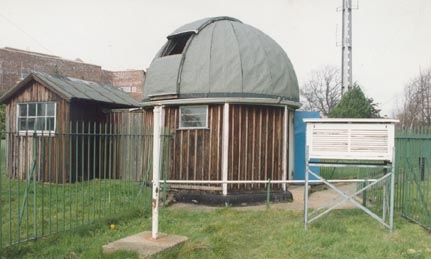
Recent photo of the Hampstead Observatory

Doug Daniels succeeded Henry Wildey as Astronomical secretary in 1988, following Wildey's retirement. Doug Daniels remained the president of the HSS for 30 years. However, in 2018, he too announced his retirement and was succeeded by Simon Lang. The current Astronomy Secretary is Andrew Rennie.

=== The Observatory today ===
The observatory is open to the public during the winter months, when the sky is more likely to be clear. The open hours are generally between 8.00pm – 10.00pm from mid September to mid April on Friday and Saturday evenings and additionally between 11am – 1.00pm on Sunday mornings. Volunteers from HSS/CATS are on hand to assist visitors.

== Amateur Telescope Makers of London ==
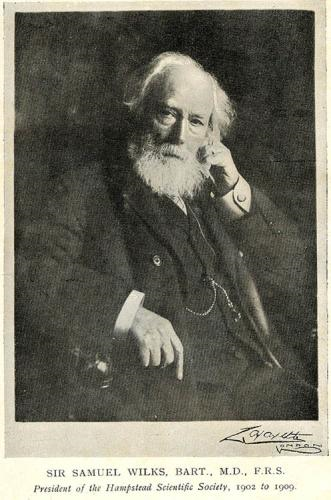
Sir Samuel Wilks 1907

The Amateur Telescope Makers of London (ATMoL), formerly known as the Camden Astronomy and Telescope-making Society (CATS) was founded in 1966 as an evening Astronomy class set up by Doug Daniels (HSS Astronomy secretary from 1988), later evolving to include telescope making under the expert tutelage of Terry Pearce.

After the closure of the original venue at Acland Burghley School in Tufnell Park, the class moved to Westminster Kingsway College, Regent's Park and continued for many years at this location until government cuts led to the class being cancelled in 2005.

This precipitated the formation of ATMoL/CATS as it is today, a non-profit subscription per term funded class, still under the tutelage and mentorship of Terry Pearce and continues its affiliation with the Astronomy section of the HSS. From 2016 the Camden Astronomy & Telescope-making Society's home has been the Holly Lodge Community Centre in Highgate and classes are fortnightly on Wednesday evenings.

== Events ==
In addition to the society's AGMs and functions, it also has a monthly lecture programme. The lectures cover a broad range of scientific areas and, like the observatory, are open to the public. The lectures are held at the Hampstead Community Centre, 78 Hampstead High St, London NW3 1RE

== See also ==
- List of astronomical societies
