= Hampstead Wells =

Historic chalybeate spa in Hampstead, London

Coordinates: 51.559304°N 0.173767°W

Hampstead Wells was a chalybeate spa and pleasure resort in Hampstead, north London, which flourished in the early 18th century. The mineral springs attracted fashionable London society and helped establish Hampstead as a leisure destination, though its use had declined by the 1730s.

== History ==
A chalybeate spring in Hampstead was publicised as early as 1653, and the traveller Celia Fiennes likened the water from a Hampstead spring to that of Tunbridge Wells or Bath in 1697. The waters used at Hampstead were often sold in markets in Central London and used by physicians to treat their patients.

Chalybeate springs were conveyed to the parish by Susannah Noel in 1698 and were immediately exploited by the new Wells trustees, who in 1700 advertised that flasks of the mineral water were on sale at several places in London, including at Charing Cross and Cheapside. The resort was developed by John Duffield, who laid out its amenities along the southern side of a promenade on what is now Well Walk. The chief building was the Great Room, used for assemblies, with its east end partitioned off as a pump room where a basin held the chalybeate waters. Concerts and dances were first advertised for the summer of 1701.

At the height of its popularity the Wells attracted notable visitors. The physician John Arbuthnot spent his mornings at the Long Room in 1734, when the poet Alexander Pope visited him there. The Upper Flask Tavern in Heath Street served as a summer meeting place of the Kit-Cat Club, a prominent association of Whig grandees and literary figures, earning a comparison with Parnassus. The club dissolved around 1720.

== Decline ==
The conversion of the Great Room into a chapel of ease by William Hoar in 1725 marked the end of the first and most colourful phase in the history of the Wells. The fountain and basin were probably moved to the Wells House around 1730. The spa gradually fell out of fashion as London society shifted its attention to other resorts. In 1734, John Soanne, as part of an effort to revive the wells, wrote of the supposed medical benefits of the wells and the diseases it had cured, himself being a regular user of the water at Hampstead. In 1882 a memorial drinking fountain was erected on Well Walk to commemorate the site of the original spring.

== Legacy ==
The principal legacy of Hampstead Wells is preserved in the street names of the surrounding area. Well Walk, where the pump room stood, takes its name directly from the spa. Flask Walk derives its name from the small flasks in which the mineral water was sold across London.
