= Wendover railway station =

Railway station in Buckinghamshire, England

Wendover
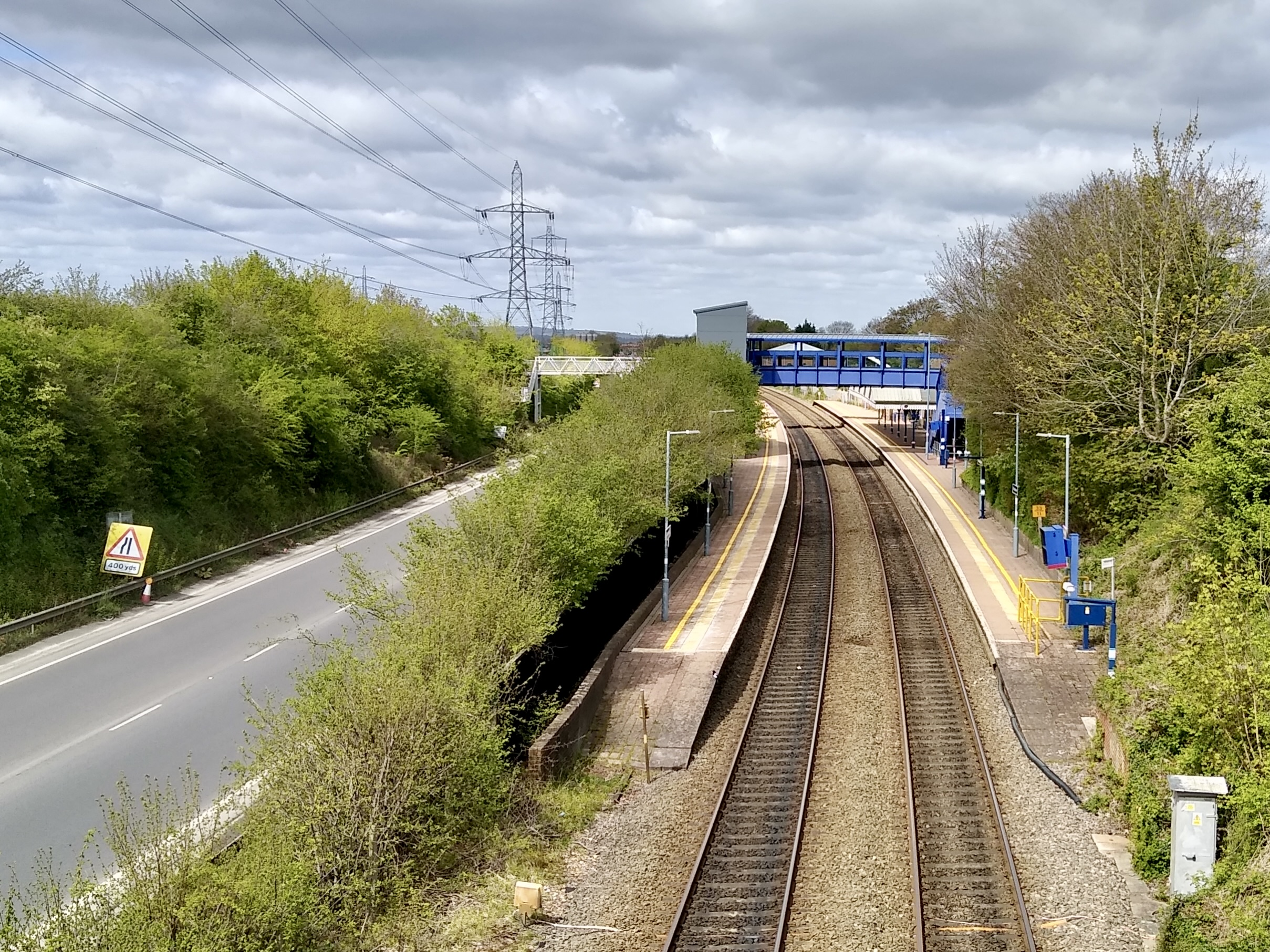

General information
- Location: Wendover, Buckinghamshire, England
- Coordinates: 51.762°N 0.747°W
- Grid reference: SP865077
- Managed by: Chiltern Railways
- Platforms: 2

Other information
- Station code: WND
- Classification: DfT category E

History
- Opened: 1892

Passengers
- 2020/21: ▼97,592
- 2021/22: ▲0.268 million
- 2022/23: ▲0.312 million
- 2023/24: ▼0.293 million
- 2024/25: ▲0.329 million
Location
Notes
- Passenger statistics from the Office of Rail and Road

Wendover railway station serves the town of Wendover, in Buckinghamshire, England, along with villages including Ellesborough and Wendover Dean. The station lies on the London to Aylesbury Line, between Great Missenden and Stoke Mandeville. The station and all services are operated by Chiltern Railways.

== History ==
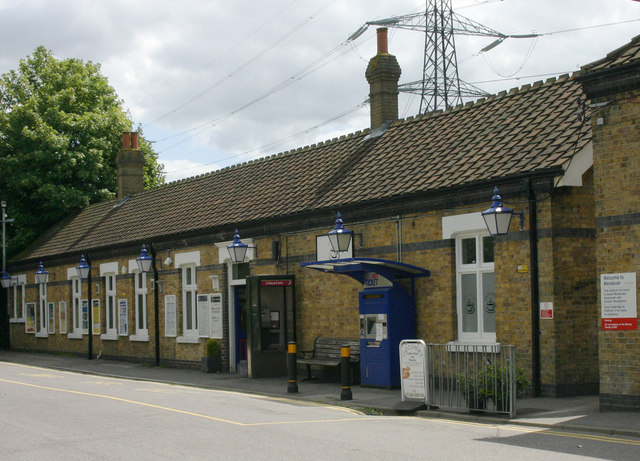
The original station building

The station was opened on 1 September 1892 by the Metropolitan Railway (Met), when the railway was extended from Chalfont Road to Aylesbury Town. The Great Central Railway served the station from 1899, connecting the station to Leicester Central, Nottingham Victoria and Sheffield Victoria.

When London Underground's Metropolitan line (the successor of the Met) was fully electrified in the late 1950s and early 1960s, a decision was made to run only as far as Amersham. This meant that Wendover was henceforth now only served by main line services; following the end of steam-hauled Metropolitan line trains in 1961, the service was provided by Class 115 diesel multiple units until 1992. Responsibility for the station, and the railway north of Amersham to Aylesbury, was transferred from London Transport to British Railways on 11 September 1961.

In 1966, following the publication of The Reshaping of British Railways report, British Rail closed the line north of Aylesbury and the station is now only served by local commuter services. British Rail ran services until privatisation in 1996, when Chiltern Railways took on the franchise.

During the modernisation of the Met in the 1950s, the down (Aylesbury-bound) platform buildings were demolished. In 1989-90, Network SouthEast refurbished the station and the up platform canopy was shortened slightly.

During 2013, a new footbridge with lifts was constructed, just beyond the London end of the canopy on the up platform. The old footbridge steps to the platforms were removed; it still provides a link from outside the station on the up side to the outside of the station on the down side.

== Facilities ==
The station has a ticket office, which is staffed in daytime seven days a week. There is a car park with 206 spaces, along with bicycle storage. Both station platforms have step-free access.

== Services ==
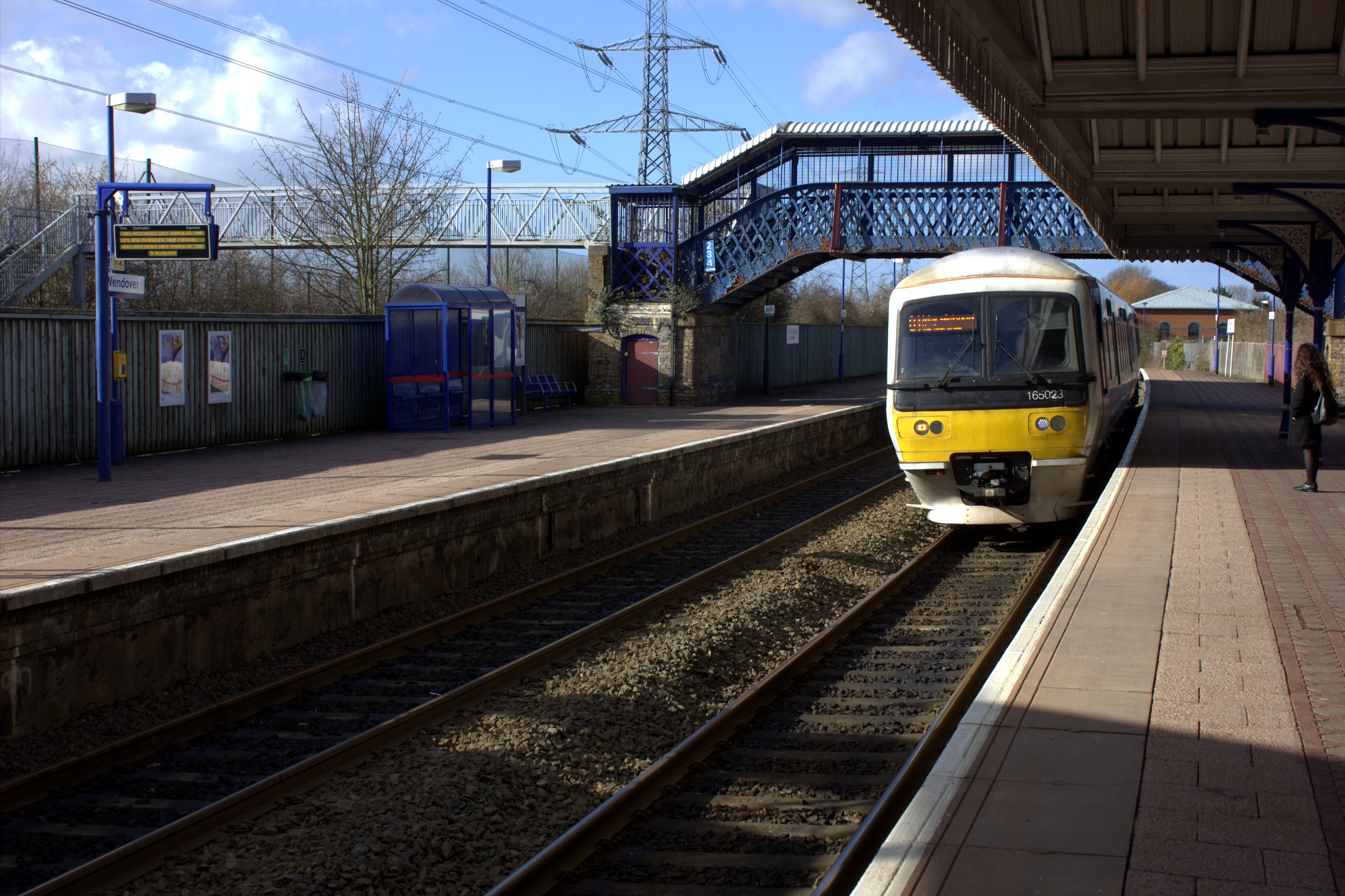
A Chiltern Railways diesel multiple unit bound for London Marylebone

Chiltern Railways operates the folliwing off-peak service, in trains per hour (tph):

- 2 tph to London Marylebone, via Amersham
- 2 tph to Aylesbury; of which:
  - 1 tph continues to Aylesbury Vale Parkway.

Journeys to Marylebone take about 50 minutes and to Aylesbury in ten minutes.

Preceding station	National Rail	Following station
Stoke Mandeville	Chiltern Railways; London to Aylesbury Line	Great Missenden
Disused railways
Preceding station	London Underground	Following station
Stoke Mandeville towards Aylesbury	Metropolitan line	Great Missenden towards Baker Street or Aldgate
