= Great Missenden railway station =

Railway station in Buckinghamshire, England

Coordinates: 51.704°N 0.709°W

Great Missenden
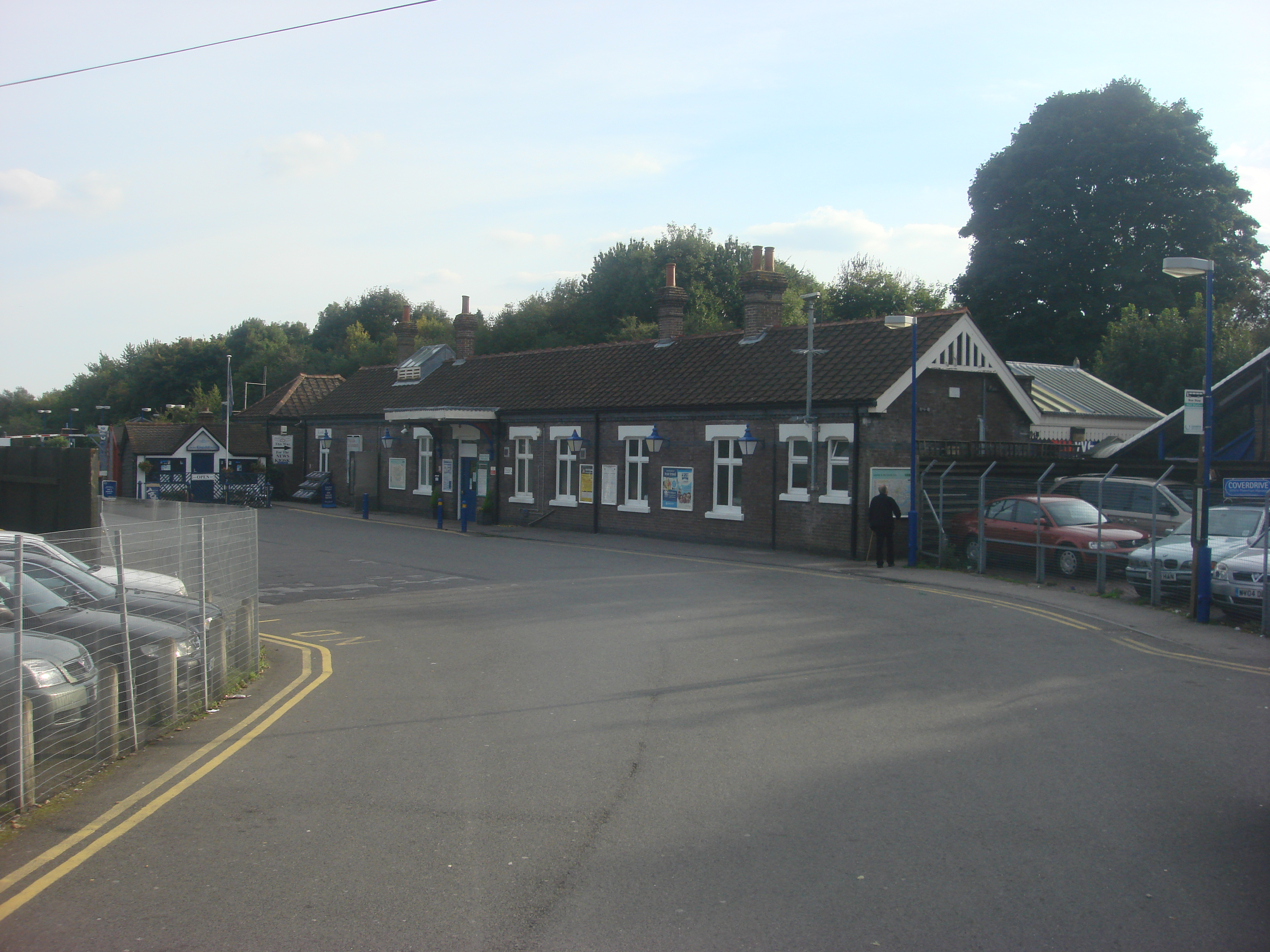

General information
- Location: Great Missenden, Buckinghamshire; England
- Grid reference: SP893013
- Managed by: Chiltern Railways
- Platforms: 2

Other information
- Station code: GMN
- Classification: DfT category E

History
- Opened: 1892

Passengers
- 2020/21: ▼88,124
- 2021/22: ▲0.288 million
- 2022/23: ▲0.376 million
- 2023/24: ▼0.369 million
- 2024/25: ▲0.399 million
Location
Notes
- Passenger statistics from the Office of Rail and Road

Great Missenden railway station serves the village of Great Missenden in Buckinghamshire, England and the neighbouring villages of Prestwood, Little Hampden and Little Missenden. The station lies on the London to Aylesbury Line and is served by Chiltern Railways trains. It is between Amersham and Wendover stations.

Both station platforms have step-free access.

== History ==
The station was opened on 1 September 1892 by the Metropolitan Railway (Met), when its railway was extended from Chalfont Road to Aylesbury Town. The Great Central Railway served the station from 1899, linking the station with Leicester, Nottingham, and Sheffield.

When London Underground's Metropolitan line (the successor of the Met) was fully electrified in the late 1950s and early 1960s, a decision was made to run only as far as Amersham. This meant that Great Missenden was henceforth now only served by main line services; following the end of steam-hauled Metropolitan line trains in 1961 the service was provided by British Rail Class 115 diesel multiple units until 1992 (which were then replaced by the line's current rolling stock). Responsibility for the station (and the railway north of Amersham to Aylesbury) was transferred from London Transport to British Railways on 11 September 1961; British Railways signage gradually replaced that of the London Underground.

In 1966 as a result of The Reshaping of British Railways report, British Railways closed the line north of Aylesbury and the station is now only served by local commuter services. British Rail ran services until privatisation in 1996, when Chiltern Railways took over the franchise.

During the modernisation of the Met in the 1950s, the down (Aylesbury) platform buildings were demolished. In 1989-90 BR's Network SouthEast refurbished the station and the "up" (London) platform canopy was shortened slightly.

A Metropolitan Railway signal box used to stand at the south end of the down platform. It ended service in 1984, and was finally removed in 2010 to be used at the Mid Hants Railway as an exhibit.

Many Prime Ministers have used the station when travelling to and from their weekend residence, Chequers.

== Services ==
At peak times there are up to four trains per hour to London in the morning, and returning from London (towards Aylesbury) in the evening. Some are express services that omit the stops shared with the Metropolitan line nearer London.

Journeys to Marylebone take about 45 minutes (35 minutes for express trains). Journeys to Aylesbury take about 15 minutes.

The normal service pattern is as follows:

- 2 trains per hour to Aylesbury
  - 1 train per hour continues on to Aylesbury Vale Parkway
- 2 trains per hour to London Marylebone

| Preceding station | National Rail | Following station |
|---|---|---|
| Wendover | Chiltern Railways; London to Aylesbury Line | Amersham |
Former Service
| Preceding station | London Underground | Following station |
| Wendover towards Aylesbury | Metropolitan line | Amersham towards Baker Street or Aldgate |

== Onward Connections ==
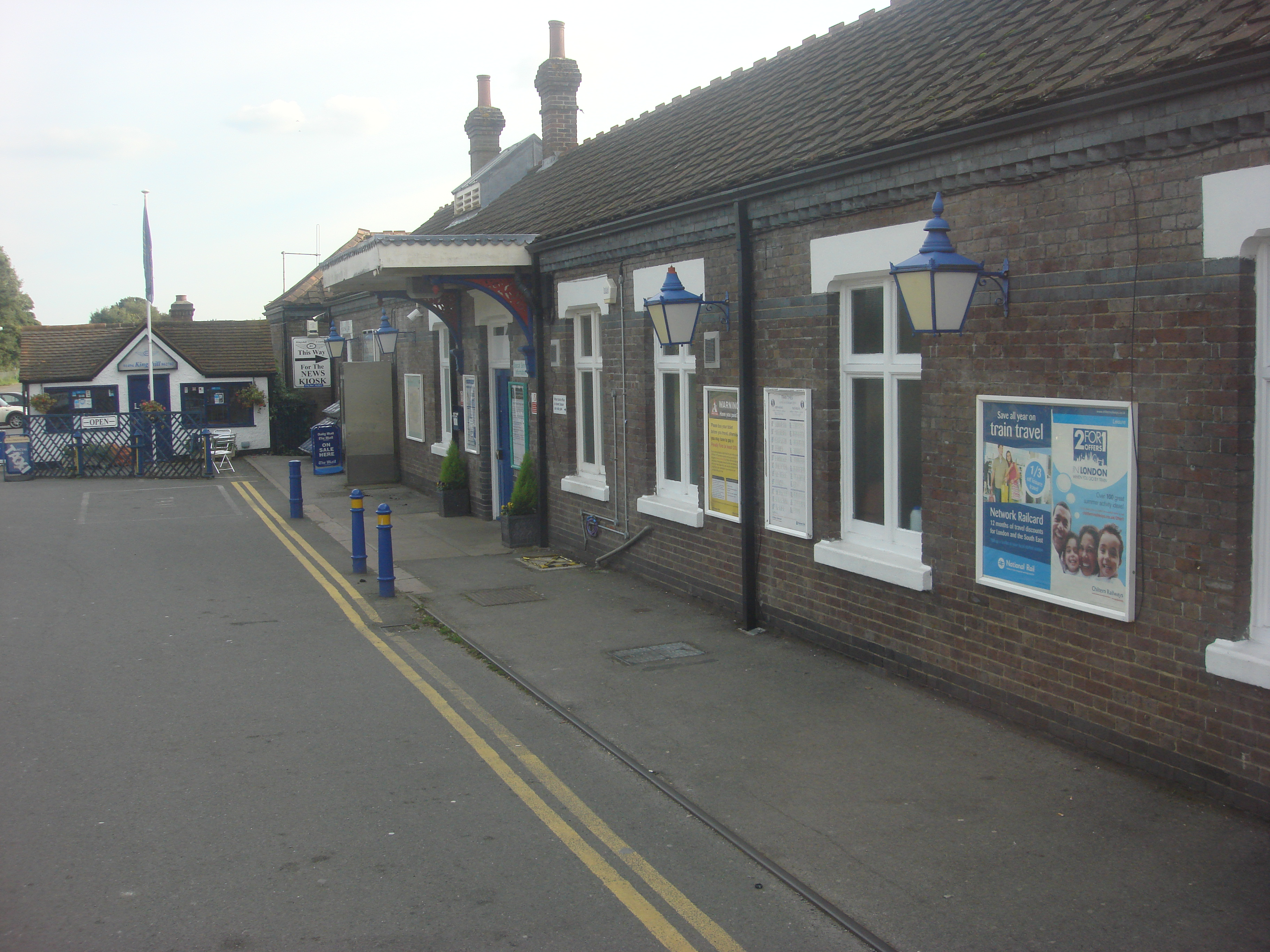
Station entrance

Buses operate from the station to High Wycombe and Amersham run by Carousel Buses.
