= Stoke Mandeville railway station =

Railway station in Buckinghamshire, England

Stoke Mandeville
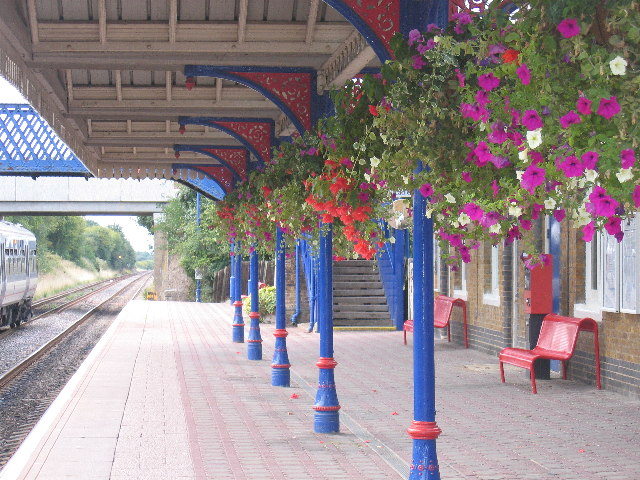

General information
- Location: Stoke Mandeville, Buckinghamshire, England
- Coordinates: 51.788°N 0.784°W
- Grid reference: SP839106
- Managed by: Chiltern Railways
- Platforms: 2

Other information
- Station code: SKM
- Classification: DfT category E

History
- Original company: Metropolitan Railway
- Pre-grouping: Metropolitan and Great Central Joint Railway
- Post-grouping: Metropolitan and Great Central Joint Railway

Key dates
- 1 September 1892: Station opened

Passengers
- 2020/21: ▼58,682
- 2021/22: ▲0.150 million
- 2022/23: ▲0.183 million
- 2023/24: ▲0.185 million
- 2024/25: ▲0.192 million
Location
Notes
- Passenger statistics from the Office of Rail and Road

Stoke Mandeville railway station serves the village of Stoke Mandeville, south of Aylesbury, in Buckinghamshire, England. It lies on the London-Aylesbury line, between Wendover and Aylesbury. The station and all services are operated by Chiltern Railways.

== History ==
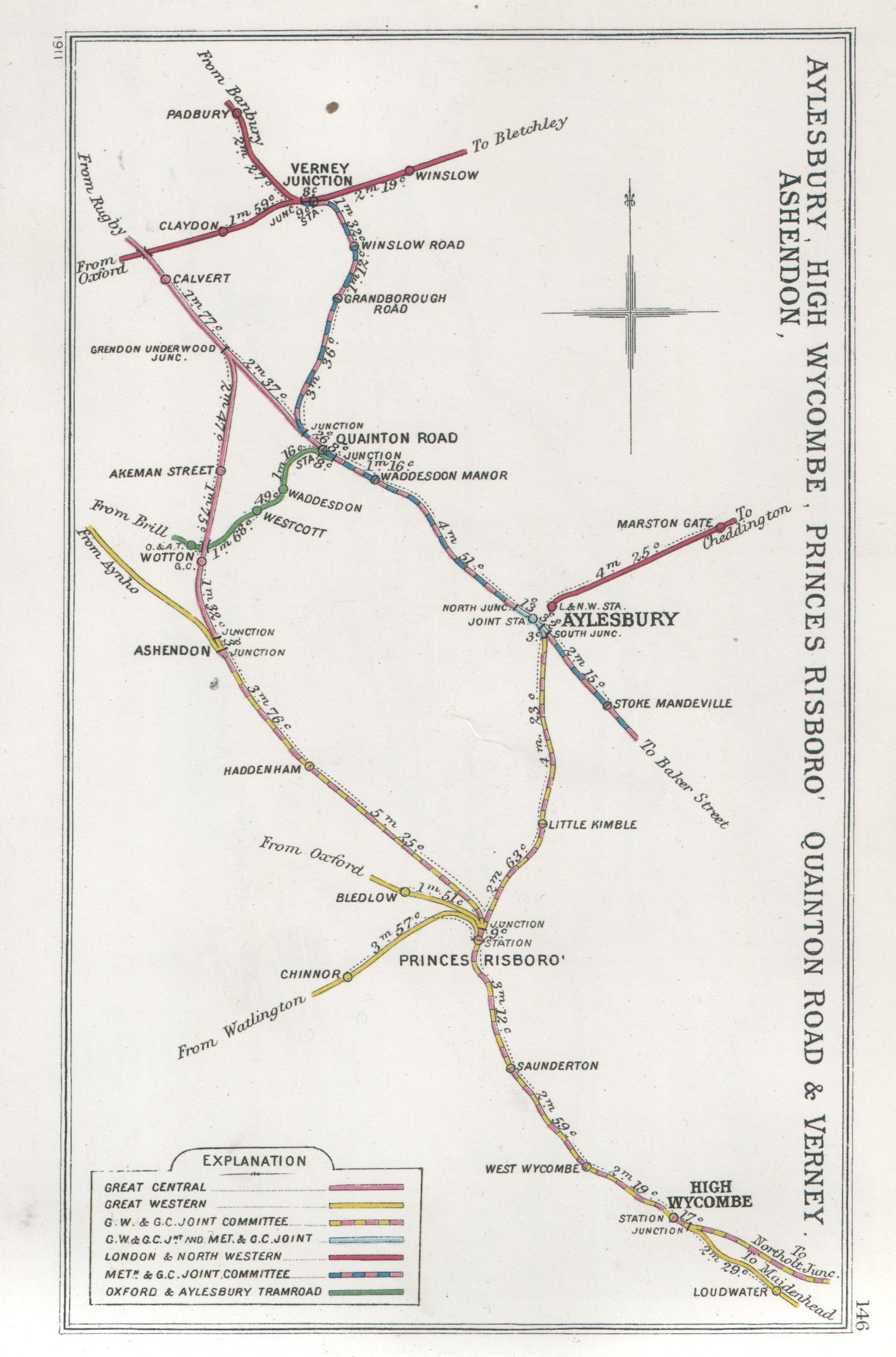
A 1911 Railway Clearing House map of railways in and around Stoke Mandeville

The station was opened on 1 September 1892, by the Metropolitan Railway (Met), when its main line was extended from Chalfont Road to Aylesbury Town. The Great Central Railway served the station from 1899, connecting the station to Leicester Central, Nottingham Victoria and Sheffield Victoria.

When London Underground's Metropolitan line (the successor to the Met) was fully electrified in the late 1950s and early 1960s, a decision was made to run only as far as Amersham. This meant that Stoke Mandeville was henceforth now only served by main line services; following the end of steam-hauled Metropolitan line trains in 1961, the service was provided by Class 115 diesel multiple units until 1992. Responsibility for the station, and the railway north of Amersham to Aylesbury, was transferred from London Transport to British Railways on 11 September 1961; British Railways signage gradually replaced that of the London Underground.

In 1966, following publication of the Reshaping of British Railways report, the line north of Aylesbury was closed and the station was only served by local routes. Services were run by British Rail until privatisation in 1996, when Chiltern Railways took on the franchise.

During the modernisation of the Met in the 1950s, the down (Aylesbury-bound) platform buildings were demolished. In 1989-90, Network SouthEast refurbished the station and the up platform canopy was shortened slightly.

The lawn at the station front features several sculptures, including a statue of a former employee.

== Facilities ==
The station has a ticket office, which is staffed each morning and also weekday evenings. There is a car park with 267 spaces, along with bicycle storage. Both station platforms have step-free access.

== Services ==
Chiltern Railways operates the following off-peak service, in trains per hour (tph):

- 2 tph to London Marylebone, via Amersham
- 2 tph to Aylesbury; of which:
  - 1 tph continues to Aylesbury Vale Parkway.

Journeys to Marylebone take about 55 minutes and to Aylesbury in five minutes.

Preceding station	National Rail	Following station
Aylesbury	Chiltern Railways; London to Aylesbury Line	Wendover
Disused railways
Preceding station	London Underground	Following station
Aylesbury Terminus	Metropolitan line	Wendover towards Baker Street or Aldgate

== Onward connections ==
Redline operates bus route 300, which connects Aylesbury, Princes Risborough and High Wycombe; it calls at the station and at Stoke Mandeville Hospital. Further services to other locations, including Chesham, Tring and Wendover, are available nearby in the village.
