= London–Aylesbury line =

Railway line in the UK

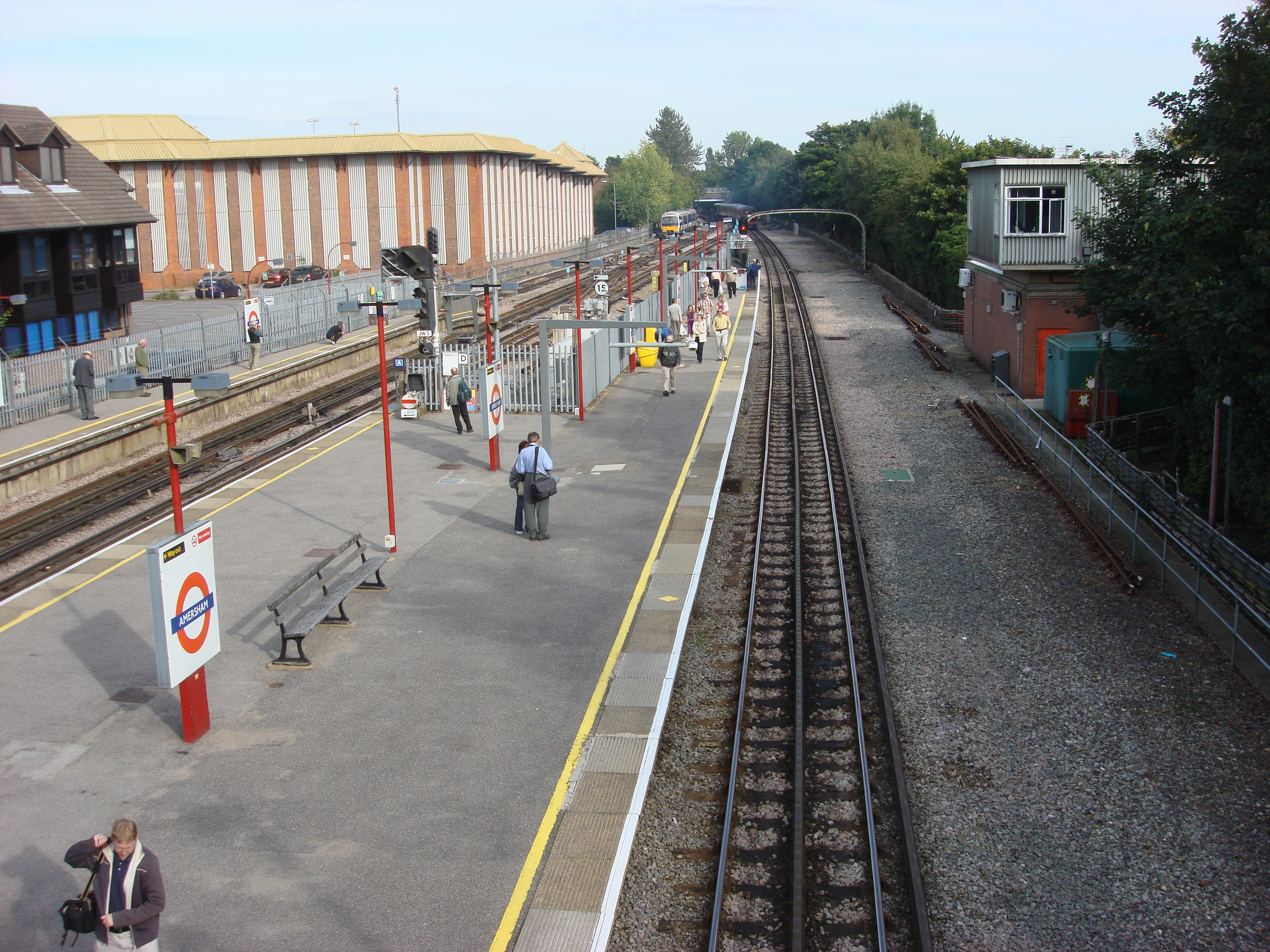
- Amersham station

Overview
- Status: Operational
- Owner: London Underground; Network Rail
- Locale: Greater London; South East England
- Termini: London Marylebone; Aylesbury Vale Parkway (Passenger); Calvert (Freight)
- Stations: 16

Service
- Type: Commuter rail, Suburban rail, Rapid transit
- System: London Underground; National Rail
- Services: 2
- Operators: London Underground (Metropolitan line); Chiltern Railways
- Depot(s): Neasden (Met), Aylesbury TMD (Chiltern)
- Rolling stock: S Stock; Class 165 "Networker Turbo"; Class 168 "Clubman"

History
- Opened: 1892 (fully)
- Closed: Quainton Rd – Verney Junction/Brill – 1936; North of Calvert (GCML) – 1966

Technical
- Num of tracks: 2
- Track gauge: 1,435 mm (4 ft 8 1/2 in) standard gauge
- Electrification: 750 V DC fourth rail (LUL section only)
- Operating speed: 75 mph (121 km/h) maximum
Route map
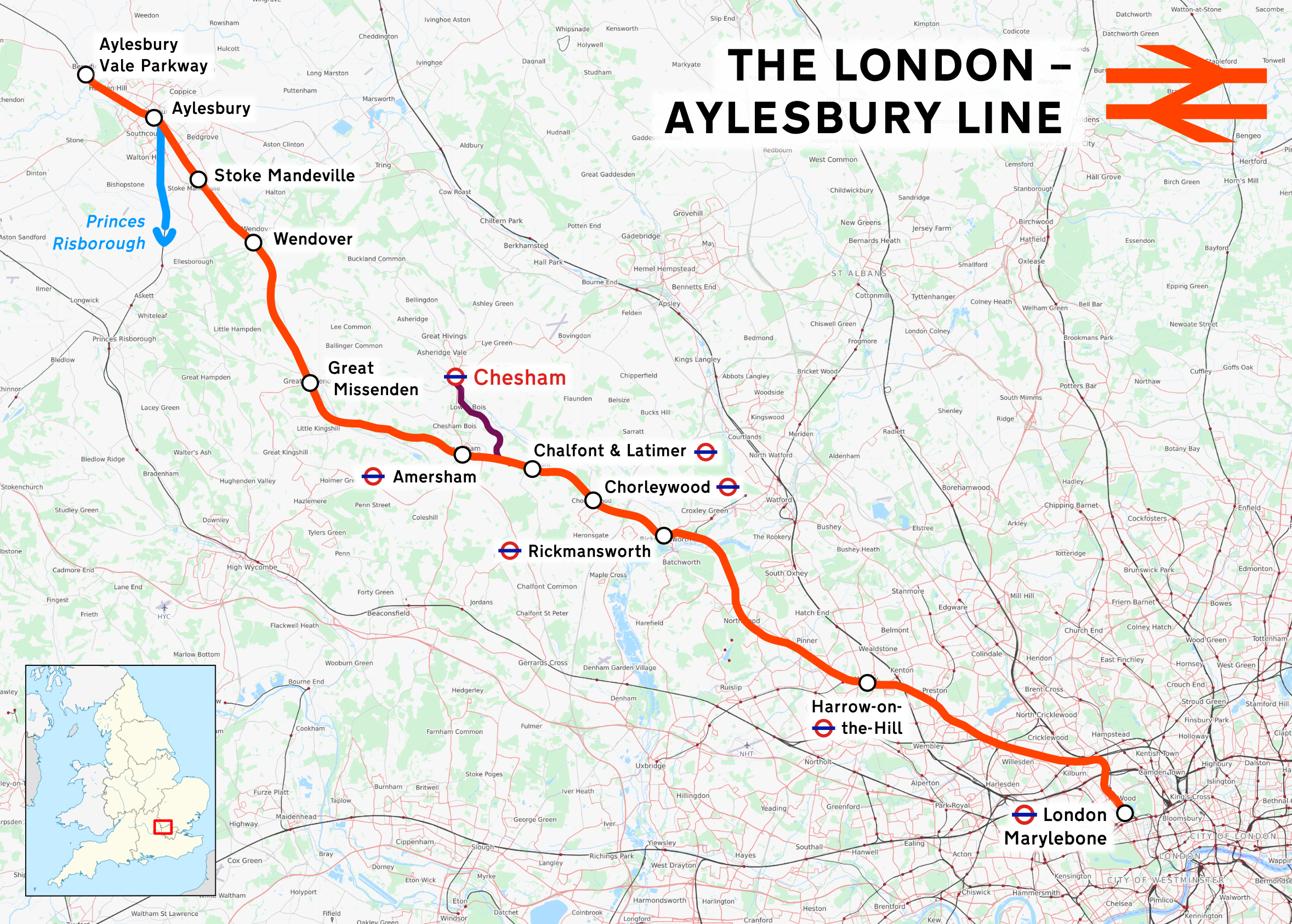
(Click to expand)

The London–Aylesbury line is a railway line between London Marylebone and Aylesbury, going via the Chiltern Hills; passenger trains are operated by Chiltern Railways. Nearly half of the line, approximately 16 miles (26 km), is owned by London Underground; the total length of the passenger line is about 39 miles (63 km). North of this, the line continues for freight-only movements to the Calvert landfill site

The line uses part of the right-of-way of a former trunk route, the Great Central Main Line.

== History ==
=== Development of the route ===
The route towards Aylesbury opened in stages between 1868 and 1899:

1. The Metropolitan and St John's Wood Railway (later part of the Metropolitan Railway) opened from Baker Street to Swiss Cottage in 1868.
2. The Aylesbury and Buckingham Railway connected Verney Junction with Aylesbury in 1868. The route would become part of the Met in 1891.
3. In 1879 the Met was extended from Swiss Cottage to Willesden Green.
4. In 1880 to Harrow -on-the-Hill.
5. In 1885 to Pinner.
6. In 1887 to Rickmansworth.
7. In 1889 to Chesham.
8. Then in September 1892 the Metropolitan connected to Aylesbury via Amersham, making the Chesham route a branch line.

The Great Central Railway (GCR) decided to build a main line called the London Extension from Annesley Junction north of Nottingham to London via the Metropolitan Railway. It was the last main line to be built in Britain in the Victorian era. The line was completed in 1899. In 1903 the line between Harrow and Canfield Place (near Finchley Road) was built, thus bypassing this part of the Metropolitan tracks. The route was a major trunk route with many prestigious trains, such as The Master Cutler and The South Yorkshireman.

The Metropolitan line service north of Aylesbury to Verney Junction and Brill was withdrawn in 1936. The line beyond Aylesbury Vale Parkway is closed to passenger services, now being used only for freight to the Calvert waste handling site and occasional excursion trains to Quainton. An early proposal to use it to create a branch line from East West Rail was dismissed in May 2023.

=== Electrification ===
The line north west from Harrow was electrified in stages. In 1925, four rail electrification reached Rickmansworth and Watford, and the Metropolitan Railway planned to electrify the line as far as Aylesbury by 1935. However, when the Met was absorbed into LT the plans were put on hold. Electrification of the final leg of the Met finally got under way in the late 1950s, but LT decided later to electrify only up to Amersham. The original intention to electrify further is evidenced by the colour light signalling which was fully installed as far as Aylesbury and by platform extensions up to Stoke Mandeville. In 1961 LT withdrew the Metropolitan line from Aylesbury and since then it goes only as far as Amersham. Following the end of steam-hauled Metropolitan line trains in 1961 the service was provided by British Rail Class 115 diesel multiple units until 1992 (which were then replaced by the line's current rolling stock) – along with Metropolitan line electric multiple units south of Amersham. The last steam train ran on 17 June 1962 and the timetable from 18 June reduced the London to Aylesbury timings from 90 minutes to 59. Responsibility for the line north of Amersham was transferred from London Transport to British Railways on 11 September 1961; London Underground signage at the stations on this section was gradually replaced by those of British Railways.

=== Rationalisation from 1960s onwards ===
The mainline services north of Aylesbury (via Woodford Halse, Rugby and Loughborough to Nottingham Victoria and beyond) were withdrawn in 1966 as the Great Central Main Line was seen by Dr Beeching as a duplicate of the Midland Main Line. For many years only freight services were operated to a landfill site at Calvert, though theses ceased in the late 1990s. During HS2 construction the line was again used for freight traffic, and on certain Bank Holidays special passenger train service runs to and from Quainton Road. The track between Calvert west to Bicester Village and the line to Bletchley has been reconstructed and reopened as part of East West Rail.

InterCity 125 trains were used on the line, albeit rarely, during the 1980s. Also in the 1980s, there were passenger specials north to Milton Keynes from Marylebone via Aylesbury and High Wycombe, which picked up passengers at Quainton Road and the disused Winslow railway station.

Up until 1993, trains heading for Aylesbury stopped at Moor Park. However, due to low passenger demand and complications with the London fares zone, the service was scrapped and trains went directly through to Rickmansworth.

On 14 December 2008, Chiltern Railways opened a new station, Aylesbury Vale Parkway. This station is situated two miles NW of Aylesbury station.

== Route description ==
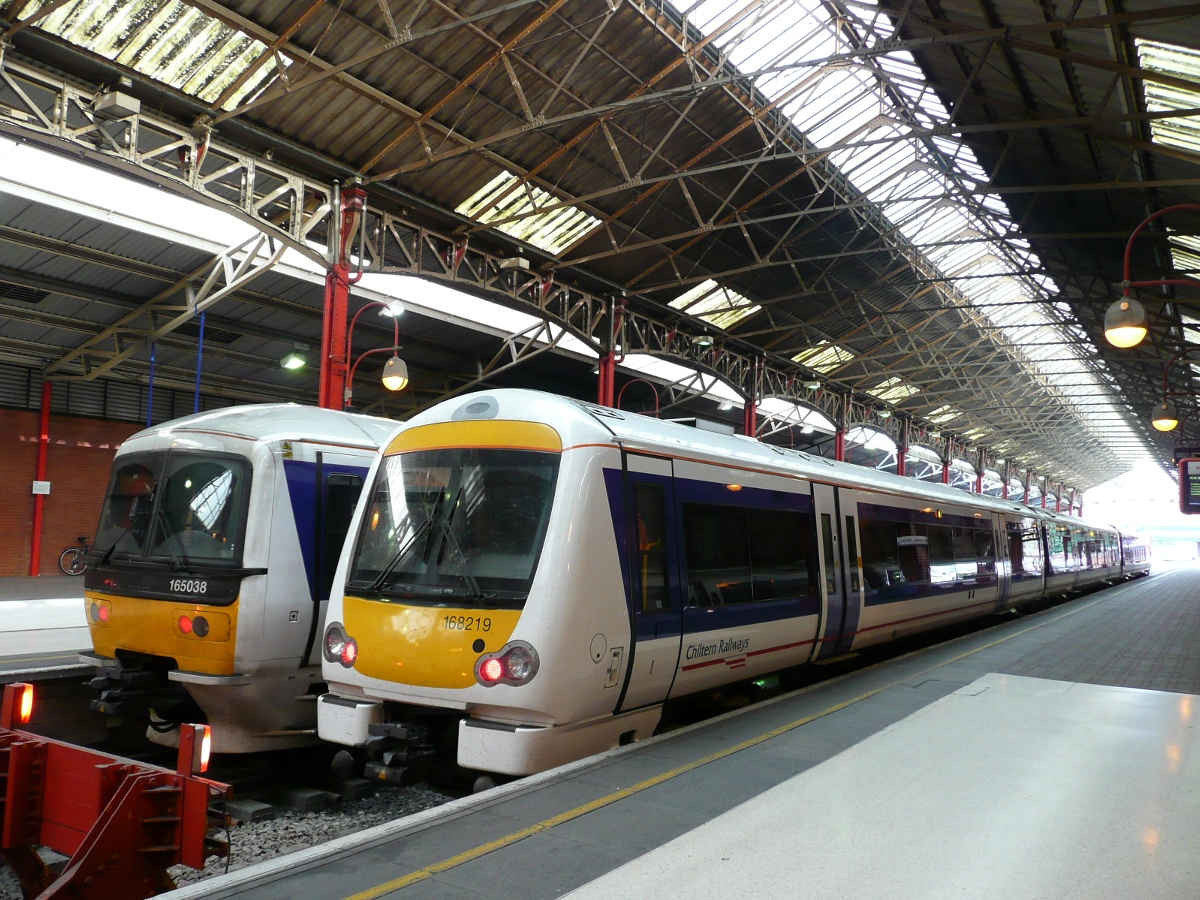
Class 165 and 168 trains at London Marylebone

From Marylebone the line runs through a series of tunnels as far as Finchley Road, from where the line runs overground and runs parallel to the Metropolitan and Jubilee lines. At Neasden Junction, the Chiltern Main Line diverges to the west, while the Aylesbury line continues north parallel to the underground lines. The line then joins the Metropolitan line tracks a few yards south of Harrow-on-the-Hill station and shares this track with the London Underground's fast Metropolitan line services to Amersham from Baker Street. Beyond Moor Park, the line to Watford diverges.

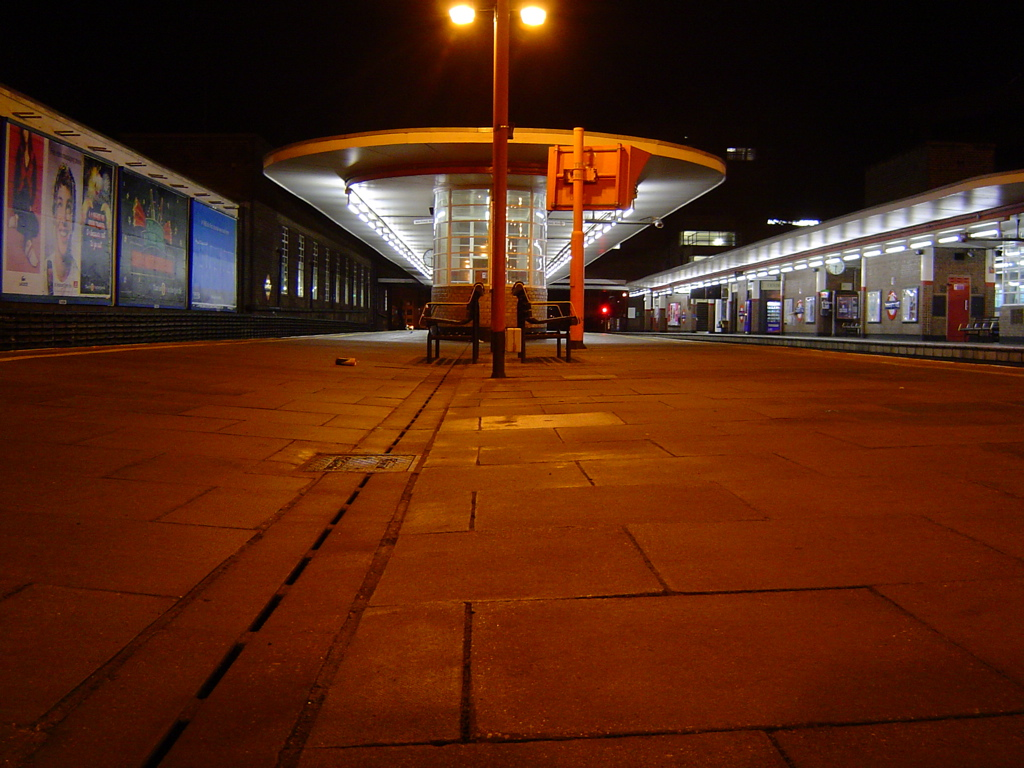
Harrow-on-the-Hill station

Between Rickmansworth and Chorleywood, the M25 motorway crosses on a viaduct. After Chalfont & Latimer station, the Chesham branch diverges, and the main line continues to Amersham, the terminus for Metropolitan line trains. Beyond Amersham, the line returns to Network Rail control and runs northwest to Aylesbury, following the A413 road. The Princes Risborough line joins the main line at Aylesbury, where Chiltern Railways have a maintenance depot. There, the line becomes single track, and after Aylesbury Vale Parkway, freight only, passing through Quainton Road to Calvert, the site of a major waste transfer station and landfill site. Beyond Calvert, the trackbed divides at Claydon LNE Junction, with one branch turning east to join the former Varsity Line route (at Verney Junction), while the former Great Central Main Line continues northwest.

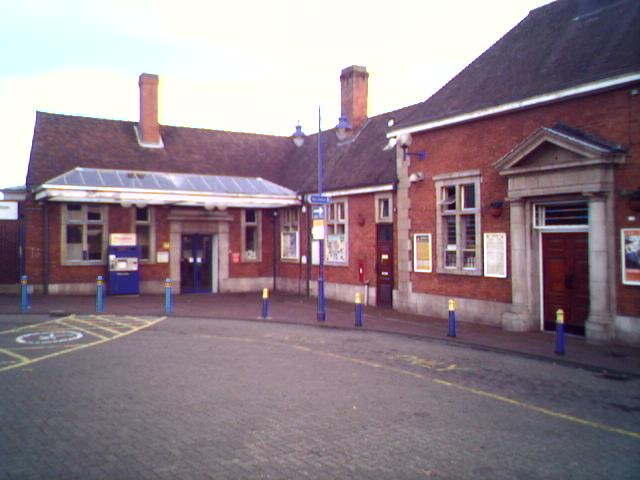
Aylesbury station

London Underground own the track and co-run on the line between Harrow on the Hill and the property boundary north of Amersham.

The line serves the following stations:

- London Marylebone
- Harrow on the Hill
- Rickmansworth
- Chorleywood
- Chalfont and Latimer
- Amersham
- Great Missenden
- Wendover
- Stoke Mandeville
- Aylesbury
- Aylesbury Vale Parkway
- (Quainton Road)

== Operation ==
Passenger services are provided by Chiltern Railways. From Marylebone to Neasden Junction the track is shared with the Chiltern Main Line and from Harrow to Amersham the track is shared with London Underground's Metropolitan line, and is used by their "fast" services. As a result, all Chiltern trains must be fitted with the tripcock braking system to run on Underground lines. Marylebone Signalling Control Centre controls all the signals on the line between Marylebone and south of Harrow, and also from north of Amersham to Aylesbury. Marylebone can see all train movements throughout the line but does not control the signals on the Metropolitan line section. These are operated by London Underground signal cabins at Harrow, Rickmansworth and Amersham. The Network Rail-controlled section of the line is fully equipped with ATP, one of three lines in Britain to have this (the others being the Chiltern Main Line and the Great Western Main Line). As a result, all Chiltern trains must be equipped with ATP equipment.

The line operates lower frequency timetables during autumn as trains need to take more time to brake due to the leaves that fall on the line in the heavily wooded section between Amersham and Rickmansworth.

=== Weekday off-peak service pattern ===
As of 28 December 2014:

Chiltern Railways
Service	Type	Frequency^{†}	Additional information	Chalfont & Latimer – Marylebone journey time
Marylebone – Aylesbury	Fast	2 tph	1 tph extended to Aylesbury Vale Parkway	35 minutes
Metropolitan line
Service	Type	Frequency^{†}	Additional information	Chalfont & Latimer – Baker Street journey time
Aldgate – Amersham	Slow	2 tph	Some rush-hour services are limited-stop	48 minutes
Aldgate – Chesham	Slow	2 tph	Some rush-hour services are limited-stop	48 minutes

† – tph = train(s) per hour

== Future ==
- Following completion of a major track work project in December 2006, journey times on the line were cut by about 10 minutes. Major track replacement work is under way on the London Underground parts of the line, to increase maximum speeds and reduce delays.
- The line north of Aylesbury was reopened to regular passenger traffic in 2008 as far as the new Aylesbury Vale Parkway station. In the long term, the line could reopen beyond Aylesbury Vale Parkway to join East West Rail, allowing passenger services to reach Winslow, Milton Keynes Central and Bedford. However, in May 2023, the propose was dismissed explicitly from current funding plans.
- A proposal announced in March 2010 would have routed the future high speed line, High Speed 2, parallel with a section of the Chiltern Main Line. If this was undertaken, it would have been a non-stop service, with no interconnections with the Chiltern Line.

== National Rail passenger volume ==
These are the passenger usage statistics on the National Rail network from the year beginning April 2002 to the year beginning April 2022. Large increases in 2010-11 in some stations are mainly due to the introduction of Oyster Cards on the National Rail Network. The reason there were no usage figures in the first three years for stations from Amersham to Harrow-on-the-Hill was because these figures were not yet separated from the London Underground figures, who own and share the same tracks at this point. Aylesbury Vale Parkway has no previous data for the first five years as it only opened in 2008.

Station usage
Station name	2002–03	2004–05	2005–06	2006–07	2007–08	2008–09	2009–10	2010–11	2011–12	2012–13	2013–14	2014–15	2015–16	2016–17	2017–18	2018–19	2019–20	2020–21	2021–22	2022–23	2023–24	2024–25
Aylesbury Vale Parkway	—N/a	—N/a	—N/a	—N/a	—N/a	13,058	49,212	55,864	72,760	81,696	100,886	128,644	168,610	169,164	185,748	203,266	206,834	36,706	86,896	103,744		
Aylesbury	939,033	1,101,302	1,048,931	1,092,423	1,129,973	1,093,076	1,025,136	1,067,280	1,060,698	1,068,894	1,104,398	1,134,222	1,158,350	1,176,646	1,178,490	1,235,236	1,207,764	298,176	742,942	873,932		
Stoke Mandeville	267,307	318,451	316,986	313,188	309,449	312,744	282,086	292,478	294,944	288,208	303,742	312,744	316,102	318,494	314,366	318,244	301,948	58,682	149,652	183,476		
Wendover	382,436	409,616	405,386	403,674	405,247	427,314	406,506	414,214	435,292	434,952	462,490	487,472	506,538	502,368	213,744	213,988	202,084	34,738	123,244	164,036		
Great Missenden	402,511	488,401	525,041	526,800	530,999	524,694	500,418	535,652	561,832	541,878	592,470	603,548	625,050	622,988	582,442	582,730	543,158	88,124	288,176	375,842		
Amersham	No data	No data	No data	1,805,767	1,510,922	1,059,766	1,218,936	1,713,718	1,784,026	2,035,452	2,164,370	2,133,978	1,944,310	1,958,866	1,940,360	1,991,780	2,067,212	450,702	1,140,340	1,563,462		
Chalfont and Latimer	No data	No data	No data	446,522	349,370	254,398	398,650	686,488	718,268	702,438	748,158	817,372	822,284	831,716	845,664	865,584	849,242	198,200	499,944	709,356		
Chorleywood	No data	No data	No data	650,033	499,400	339,532	402,688	608,914	613,282	632,460	671,680	721,940	537,576	552,374	553,378	564,838	557,144	128,464	335,742	455,396		
Rickmansworth	No data	No data	No data	276,561	202,743	152,268	285,790	663,990	735,116	733,604	807,286	931,434	1,124,216	1,162,196	1,171,026	1,205,320	1,174,776	338,060	763,008	983,308		
Harrow-on-the-Hill	No data	No data	No data	207,167	293,939	157,534	453,158	1,309,328	1,444,386	1,410,622	1,396,730	1,925,856	2,395,172	2,463,400	2,518,034	2,635,282	2,653,640	731,734	1,631,270	2,615,942		
Marylebone	6,354,517	6,949,363	6,819,287	11,638,642	11,559,187	11,396,645	11,758,094	13,200,221	14,410,072	14,685,1481	15,520,762	15,977,862	15,932,954	16,666,936	16,693,320	16,146,552	15,796,118	2,034,854	7,488,490	10,307,792		
The annual passenger usage is based on sales of tickets in stated financial years from Office of Rail and Road estimates of station usage. The statistics are for passengers arriving and departing from each station and cover twelve-month periods that start in April. Methodology may vary year on year. Usage since the period 2019–20 have been affected by the COVID-19 pandemic, especially the period 2020–23.
