= Chiltern Railways =

British state-owned train operating company

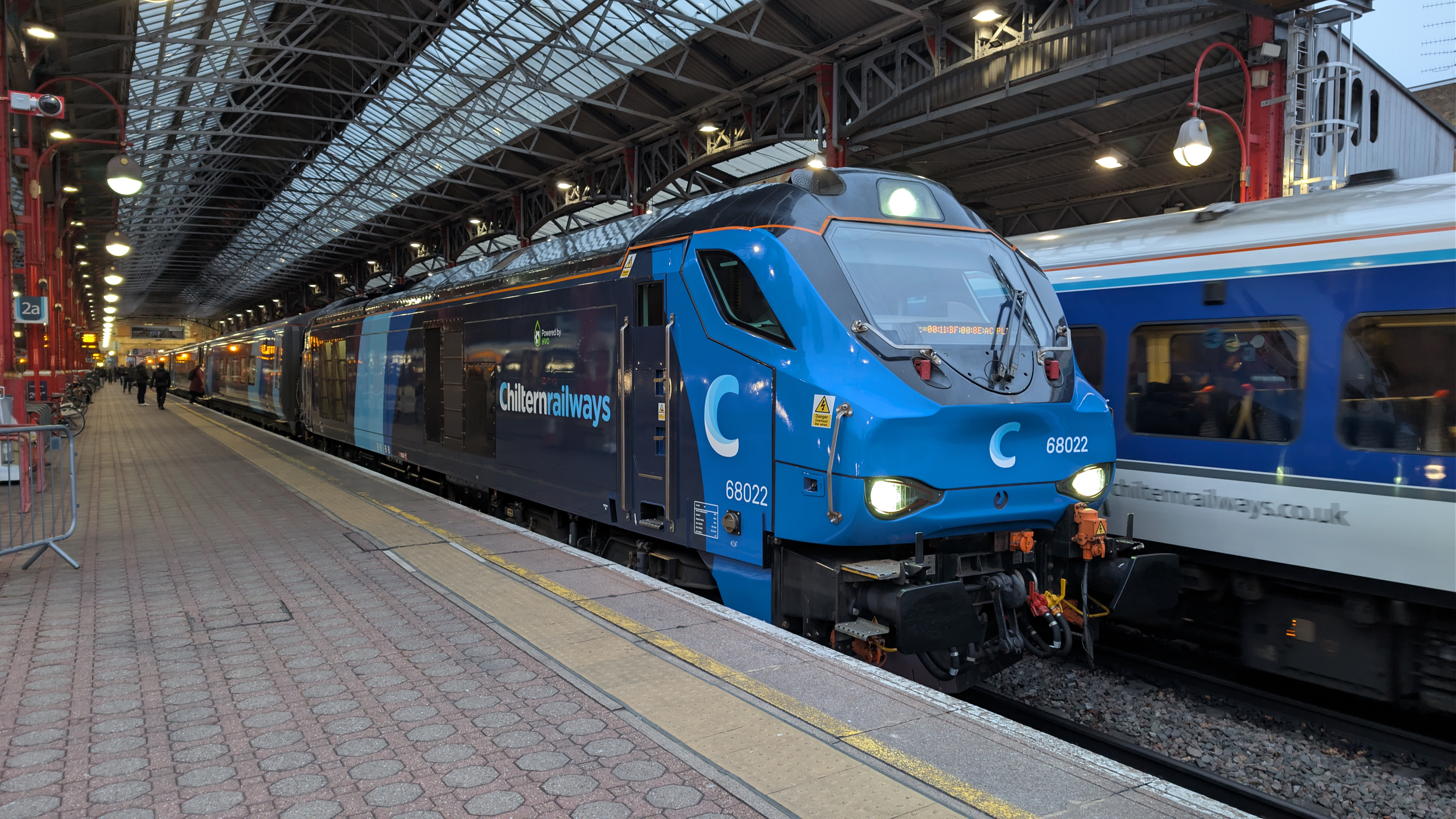
- A Chiltern Explorer set formed of a Class 68 and Mark 5A coaches at London Marylebone

Overview
- Main regions: Greater London; South East England; West Midlands
- Other regions: East Midlands; East of England
- Fleet: Class 68 hauling Mark 5A coaches; Class 165 Networker Turbo; Class 168 Clubman
- Stations called at: 66
- Stations operated: 32
- Parent company: DfT Operator
- Reporting mark: CH
- Predecessor: Chiltern Railways (1996–2026)

Technical
- Length: 336.4 km (209.0 mi)

Other
- Website: www.chilternrailways.co.uk
Route map

Chiltern Rail Limited, trading as Chiltern Railways and GBR Chiltern, is a state-owned British train operating company that took over the services of the operator of the same name from Arriva UK Trains on 20 September 2026, when the latter's contract ended.

== History ==
In the lead up to the 2024 United Kingdom general election, the Labour Party, led by Sir Keir Starmer, committed itself to bring the passenger operations of the British rail network back under state ownership.

Following its election in 2024, the government introduced the Passenger Railway Services (Public Ownership) Act 2024 that received the royal assent in November 2024.

In March 2026, the Department for Transport announced that the contract for the privately-owned train operating company of the same name would end and DfT Operator would take over on 20 September 2026.

Chiltern Railways is expected to reinstate direct services between Marylebone and Stratford-upon-Avon, running twice daily on weekdays from 14 December 2026.

== Services ==
Chiltern Railways operates regular services on five routes:

- The Chiltern Main Line is the core route for the majority of Chiltern Railways services and is one of two "mainline routes" operated by the company. The route links the major cities of London and Birmingham (Marylebone and Moor Street stations respectively), passing through the towns of High Wycombe, Banbury, Royal Leamington Spa, Warwick and Solihull. Chiltern Railways operates trains along the entire line, services ranging from stopping suburban trains (e.g. London Marylebone–Gerrards Cross) to express trains running the full length of the line between London and Birmingham. The fastest timetabled journey from Birmingham to London by this route is 99 minutes (compared with 82 minutes using Avanti West Coast services between Birmingham New Street and London Euston via the West Coast Main Line). CrossCountry also operates regular services on the line north of Banbury, and West Midlands Trains operates regular services north of Dorridge.
- The London–Aylesbury line is the second main line route operated by the company. The route links London Marylebone with Aylesbury via Amersham. All Chiltern Railways services on this route run the full length of the line between Marylebone and Aylesbury stations and call at all stations north of Rickmansworth; most trains are extended one station further to Aylesbury Vale Parkway. Certain peak hour services skip some or all stations between Marylebone and Great Missenden. The line runs alongside London Underground's Metropolitan line between Finchley Road (just north of Marylebone station) and Harrow-on-the-Hill; each operator runs on separate tracks. Beyond Harrow-on-the-Hill, the tracks are shared between Chiltern Railways and Metropolitan line services. This is an example of National Rail services using non-Network Rail tracks and it uses a unique unregulated track-access agreement with London Underground. Beyond Amersham (where the Metropolitan line terminates), all services are operated by Chiltern Railways only.
- The Aylesbury–Princes Risborough line links Princes Risborough, on the Chiltern Main Line, with Aylesbury, on the London to Aylesbury line. Most trains on the line continue beyond Princes Risborough to London Marylebone, which gives Aylesbury an alternative route to reach central London; however, a few services terminate at Princes Risborough.
- The Oxford–Bicester line branches off the Chiltern Main Line just south of Bicester and links the town with Oxford. The line is mostly served by express services to and from Marylebone. Until December 2016, the line terminated a few miles north-east of Oxford, at the nearby Oxford Parkway station; the line was then extended to the main Oxford station.
- The Leamington–Stratford line branches off the Chiltern Main Line at Hatton (a few miles west of Leamington Spa) and runs to Stratford-upon-Avon. The branch line is also operated by regular West Midlands Trains services.

As of May 2026, a simplified description of the routes served off-peak Monday to Friday are as follows:

Chiltern Main Line
Route	Freq.	Calling at
London Marylebone to Birmingham Moor Street	1 tph	High Wycombe; Haddenham & Thame Parkway; Bicester North; Banbury; Leamington Spa; Warwick; Warwick Parkway; Dorridge; Solihull
London Marylebone to Birmingham Snow Hill	1 tp2h	High Wycombe; Bicester North; Banbury; Leamington Spa; Warwick; Warwick Parkway; Dorridge; Solihull; Birmingham Moor Street
London Marylebone to Banbury	1 tp2h (Note: Combined with London - Birmingham Snow Hill service to form 1 tph)	High Wycombe; Bicester North; Kings Sutton
Leamington Spa to Birmingham Moor Street	1 tp2h	Warwick; Warwick Parkway; Hatton; Lapworth; Dorridge; Solihull
Oxford–Bicester line
Route	Freq.	Calling at
London Marylebone to Oxford	1 tph	Gerrards Cross; Beaconsfield; High Wycombe; Saunderton; Princes Risborough; Bicester Village; Oxford Parkway
London Marylebone to Oxford	1 tph	Wembley Stadium; Gerrards Cross; Beaconsfield; High Wycombe; Princes Risborough; Haddenham & Thame Parkway; Bicester Village; Islip (1 tp2h); Oxford Parkway
London–Aylesbury and Aylesbury–Princes Risborough lines
Route	Freq.	Calling at
London Marylebone to High Wycombe	1 tph	Wembley Stadium; Sudbury Hill Harrow; Northolt Park; South Ruislip; West Ruislip (1 tp2h); Denham; Denham Golf Club (1 tp2h); Gerrards Cross; Seer Green and Jordans; Beaconsfield; Trains either call at West Ruislip or Denham Golf Club
Princes Risborough to Aylesbury	-	Monks Risborough; Little Kimble; Trains run irregularly, with either hourly or 90 minute gaps
London Marylebone to Aylesbury	1 tph (Note: Some hours are skipped.)	Harrow-on-the-Hill; Rickmansworth; Chorleywood; Chalfont & Latimer; Amersham; Great Missenden; Wendover; Stoke Mandeville
London Marylebone to Aylesbury Vale Parkway	1 tph	Harrow-on-the-Hill; Rickmansworth; Chorleywood; Chalfont & Latimer; Amersham; Great Missenden; Wendover; Stoke Mandeville; Aylesbury
Leamington–Stratford line
Route	Freq.	Calling at
Leamington Spa to Stratford-upon-Avon	1 tp2h	Warwick; Hatton; Claverdon; Bearley; Wilmcote; Stratford-upon-Avon Parkway

=== Parliamentary trains ===
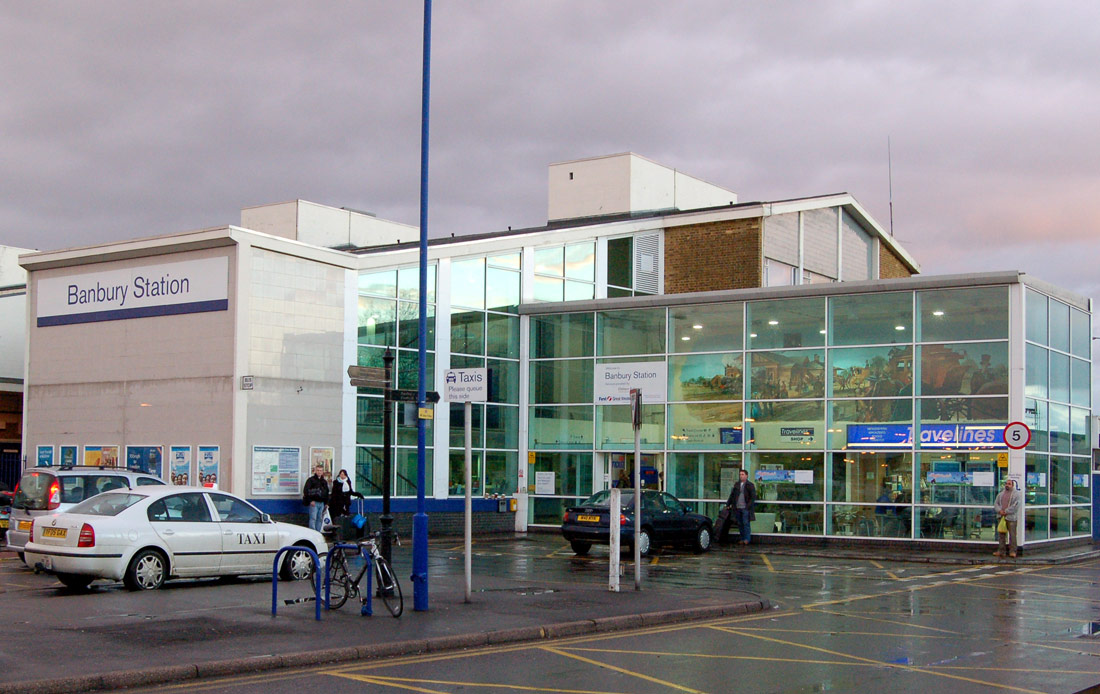
The booking hall and main entrance to Banbury

Chiltern Railways operates one parliamentary train service:

- Cherwell Valley line: there is a single daily parliamentary service from Oxford to Banbury. This service runs on Tuesdays to Saturdays just after midnight and calls at Tackley, Heyford and Kings Sutton, the three intermediate stations on the line. There is no corresponding return service heading towards Oxford. This service exists to maintain route knowledge for Chiltern Railways' drivers. Regular services on the line are operated by Great Western Railway and CrossCountry.

== Rolling stock ==
Chiltern Railways inherited the following trains from its predecessor:

=== Current fleet ===
Family	Class	Image	Type	Top speed		Number	Carriages	Routes operated	Built
Family	Class	Image	Type	mph	km/h	Number	Carriages	Routes operated	Built
Networker	Class 165/0 Networker Turbo		DMU	75	120	28	2	All Chiltern Railways services (apart from Chiltern Main Line services)	1990–1992
Networker	Class 165/0 Networker Turbo		DMU	75	120	11	3	All Chiltern Railways services (apart from Chiltern Main Line services)	1990–1992
Bombardier Turbostar	Class 168 Clubman		DMU	100	160	5	4	Chiltern Main Line and some local services	1998
Bombardier Turbostar	Class 168 Clubman		DMU	100	160	6	3	Chiltern Main Line and some local services	2000
Bombardier Turbostar	Class 168 Clubman		DMU	100	160	2	4	Chiltern Main Line and some local services	2000
Bombardier Turbostar	Class 168 Clubman		DMU	100	160	3	3	Chiltern Main Line and some local services	2004
Bombardier Turbostar	Class 168 Clubman		DMU	100	160	3	4	Chiltern Main Line and some local services	2004
Bombardier Turbostar	Class 168 Clubman		DMU	100	160	9	2	Chiltern Main Line and some local services	2000
Stadler UKLight	Class 68		Diesel-electric locomotive	100	160	8	N/A	Chiltern Explorer services on the Chiltern Main Line	2014
CAF	Mark 5A Chiltern Explorer		Coach	125	200	52	5	Chiltern Explorer services on the Chiltern Main Line	2017–2018
CAF	Mark 5A Chiltern Explorer		Driving Trailer	125	200	14	5	Chiltern Explorer services on the Chiltern Main Line	2017–2018

=== Future fleet ===
Future train types operated by Chiltern Railways include:

Family	Class	Image	Type	Top speed		Number	Carriages	Routes operated	Built
Family	Class	Image	Type	mph	km/h	Number	Carriages	Routes operated	Built
DMU
CAF Civity	Class 196		DMU	100	161	6	2	East West Rail: Oxford to Milton Keynes Central	2019–2020
