= Calvert Jubilee =

Nature reserve in Buckinghamshire, England

Coordinates: 51.9216°N 1.009°W

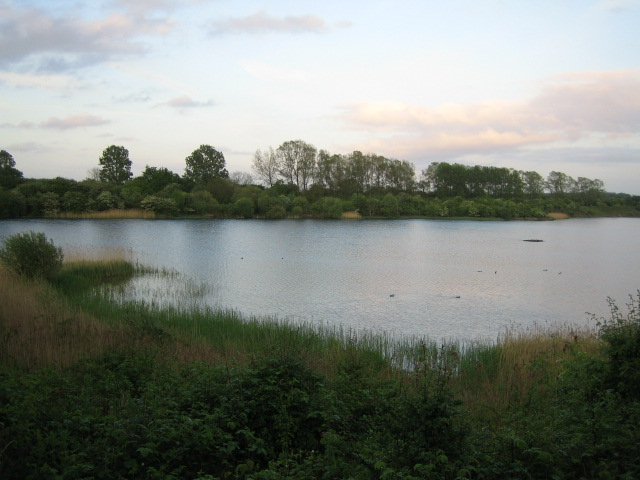
The reserve in 2007

Calvert Jubilee is a 22 hectares (54 acres) nature reserve in Calvert near Steeple Claydon in Buckinghamshire. It is managed by the Berkshire, Buckinghamshire and Oxfordshire Wildlife Trust (BBOWT). In July 2020, High Speed 2 (HS2) announced it would take possession of 20% of the reserve and clear it.

== Site ==
Most of the site is a deep lake, created by the extraction of clay for the brick industry. The abandoned Great Central Main Line also passed through the site. It is now used in winter by wildfowl such as mallard, tufted duck and pochard. There are two bird hides, and the trust has created three floating islands to enable waterfowl to breed safe from foxes. The lakeside has a variety of wild flowers and butterflies. All of the UK's five varieties of hairstreak butterfly have been seen at the reserve. It is managed by the Berkshire, Buckinghamshire and Oxfordshire Wildlife Trust (BBOWT) and there is access from the road which passes between Calvert Jubilee and Grebe Lake.

== High Speed 2 ==
The currently under construction High Speed 2 project will reuse the abandoned trackbed that runs along the eastern edge of the site. 20% of the site was required, including the trackbed.

In February 2019, BBOWT received notification of construction work for HS2 and objected to the plans since the works would interfere with the local ecosystem. In May, the trust refused access to contractors and in December the trust said it was disappointed that contractors had begun work and that HS2 Limited should wait for the findings of the Oakervee Review before proceeding. In July 2020, BBOWT announced that HS2 would be taking possession of part of the site and clearing it. HS2 Limited stated that they now owned 20% of the reserve. On the date set to repossess the land, HS2 Limited said it had postponed the operation. The company took possession of the site in September.
