= Aylesbury railway station =

Railway station in Buckinghamshire, England

Aylesbury
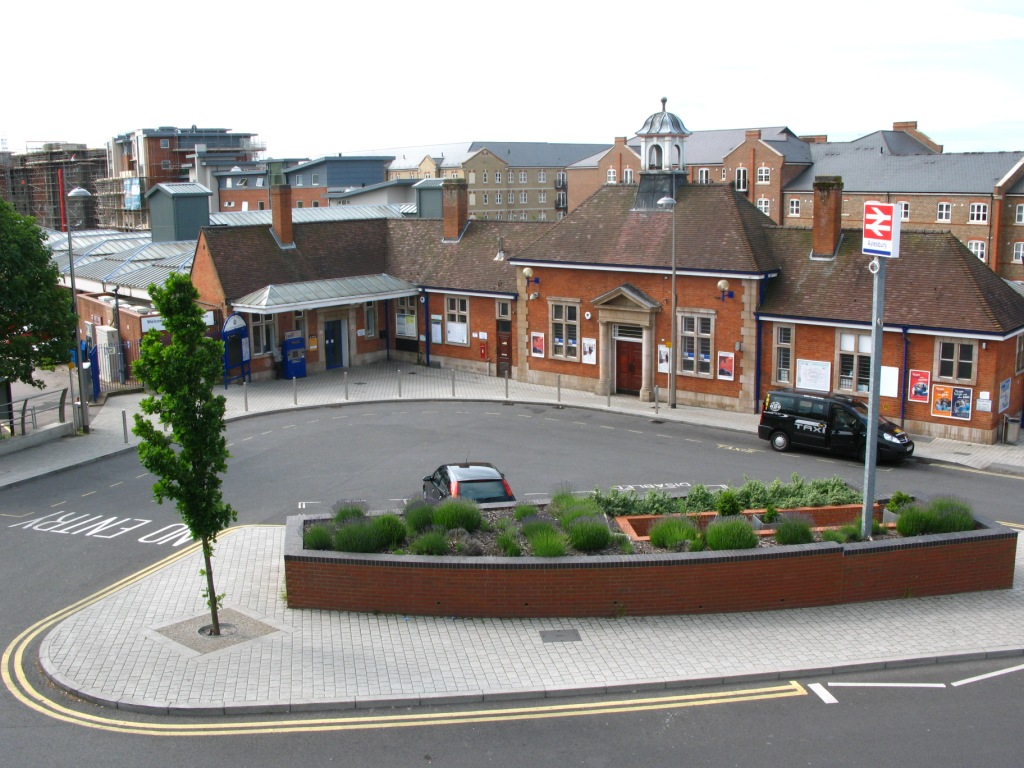
- The station forecourt

General information
- Location: Aylesbury, Buckinghamshire, England
- Coordinates: 51.8139°N 0.8151°W
- Grid reference: SP817134
- Managed by: Chiltern Railways
- Platforms: 3

Other information
- Station code: AYS
- Classification: DfT category D

History
- Opened: 1 October 1863
- Original company: Wycombe Railway

Passengers
- 2020/21: ▼0.298 million
- 2021/22: ▲0.743 million
- 2022/23: ▲0.874 million
- 2023/24: ▼0.853 million
- 2024/25: ▲0.900 million
- Interchange: 6,334
Location
Notes
- Passenger statistics from the Office of Rail and Road

Aylesbury railway station is a stop on the London–Aylesbury line, serving Aylesbury, in Buckinghamshire, England. It lies 38 miles (61 km) from London Marylebone on the Chiltern Main Line; a branch line from Princes Risborough also terminates at the station. It was the terminus for London Underground's Metropolitan line until the service was cut back to Amersham in 1961. The station was also known as Aylesbury Town, when it was under the management of British Railways from c. 1948 until the 1960s.

== History ==
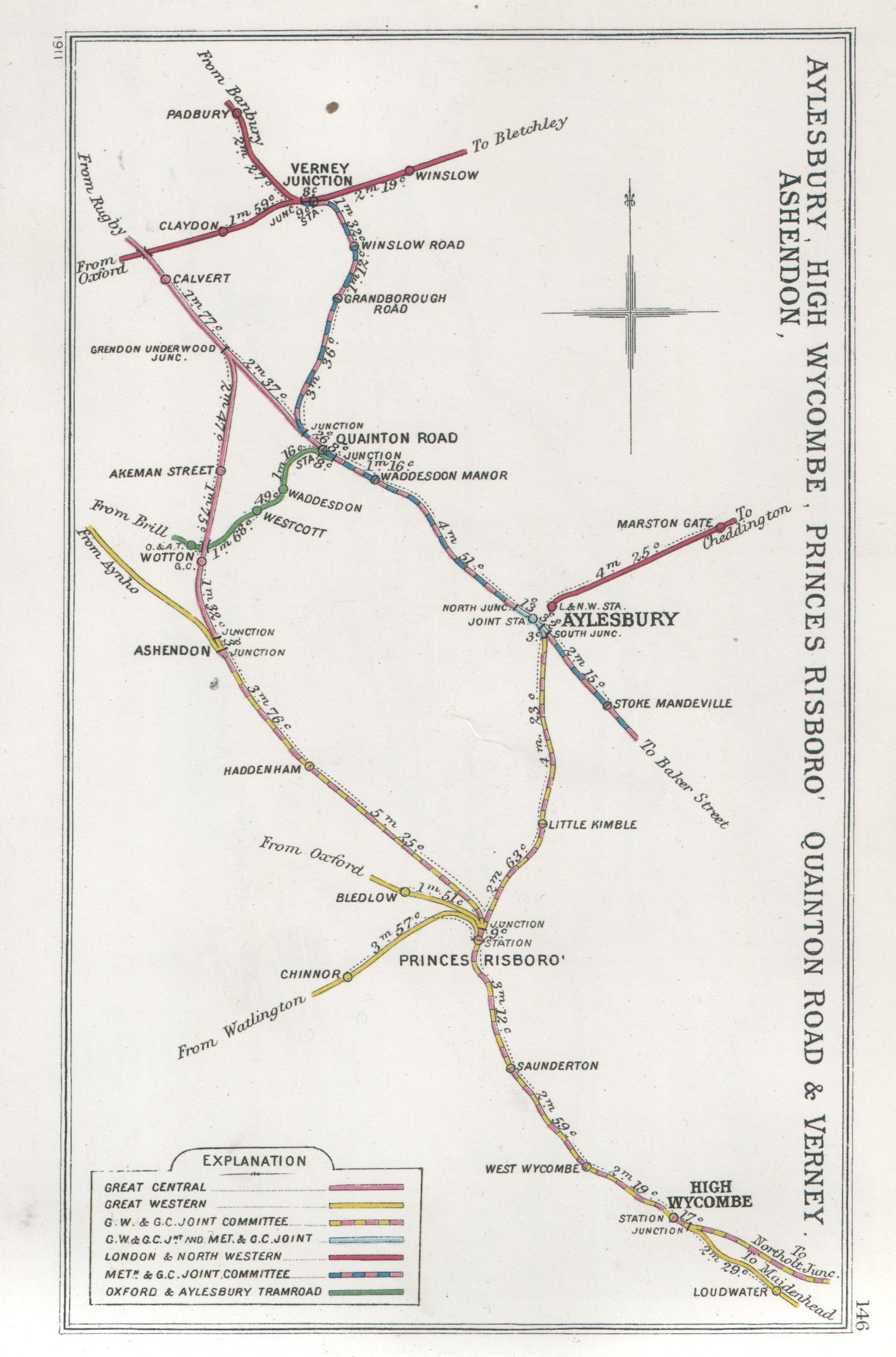
A 1911 Railway Clearing House map of railways in and around the town

Aylesbury had been served by the London and Birmingham Railway (L&BR) since 1839 when the Aylesbury Railway was opened; this was a branch from the L&BR's main line at Cheddington to Aylesbury High Street.

The first station on the present site was opened in 1863 by the Wycombe Railway, which was taken over by the Great Western Railway (GWR) in 1867. In 1868, the Aylesbury & Buckingham Railway (ABR), later part of the Metropolitan Railway, reached the town.

When opened, the line to Aylesbury from Princes Risborough was broad gauge. To avoid mixed gauge track when the Aylesbury and Buckingham line reached the station in 1868, the section to Princes Risborough was converted to standard gauge; therefore, until the rest of the Wycombe Railway was converted in 1870, there was no access to the rest of the GWR system. The GWR provided motive power and trains to both the Wycombe Railway and the A&B; it ran a shuttle service from Princes Risborough to Verney Junction.

A broad gauge single-road engine shed was provided from the station's opening in 1863; the shed was doubled in length within a year or two and, in 1870, became a two-road shed with a lean-to added to the east side of the original shed. By 1892, with the arrival of the Metropolitan Railway, the shed was converted to a north-light two-road shed using the west wall of the original broad gauge shed and the east wall of the 1870 extension.

The Metropolitan Railway opened from Chalfont Road in 1892 to a separate station named Aylesbury (Brook Street), adjacent to the GWR station. It closed in 1894 when services were diverted to the GWR station. The Great Central Railway reached Aylesbury in 1899 from Annesley Junction, just north of Nottingham Victoria, on its London extension line to London Marylebone.

=== Aylesbury railway disaster (1904) ===
The original junction layout on the route to London Marylebone included a sharp curve because the station had been a terminus for the Metropolitan Railway. This became inconvenient once some Great Central trains began to run non-stop through Aylesbury from 1899 onwards. Rather than change the junction layout to suit faster trains, a 15 mph (24 km/h) speed restriction was applied to the curve.

On 23 December 1904, at 3:38am, this curve was the site of the Aylesbury railway disaster. The 2:45am Great Central express newspaper train from London Marylebone failed to slow for the curve and was completely derailed; it consisted of a locomotive, tender and ten vehicles (three coaches, an assortment of six fish, meat and parcel vans, and a brake van). The locomotive, tender and the first three or four vehicles mounted the down platform of the station, two vehicles mounted the up platform, and the rest of the train was smashed to pieces and scattered over a distance of 50 yards (46 m) between the two platforms. The driver of the train, Joseph Barnshaw was seriously injured and died the next day. The fireman, George Masters, was killed, as were London-based driver David Summers and fireman Josiah Stanton who were travelling as passengers in the first coach on their way to Gorton, in Manchester.

There was heavy fog at the time of the accident and, at the subsequent Board of Trade inquiry, there was some doubt as to how well driver Barnshaw knew the route. What the inquiry did not touch on was that there had been a history of fast running of these newspaper trains, which had become an important traffic for the Great Central Railway. This dated back to the Boer War which had ended only two years earlier. The Manchester Guardian's stance on the Boer War had resulted in significant drops in circulation. London newspapers, led by the Daily Mail, saw a significant business opportunity in the Manchester area and sought to get their morning newspapers there in time to win a share of this market. These trains recorded fast times for the era, including an authenticated timing of 220 minutes for the 206 miles (332 km) journey including stops.

Afterwards, in 1908, the station was reconstructed and the tracks at the curve were realigned.

=== Station buildings ===
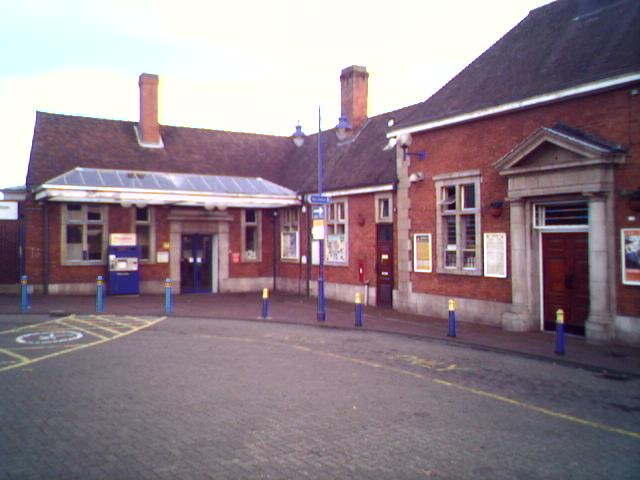
The current station building

The original station had one platform, with a brick-built station building; a canopy projected out over the platform, supported on cast iron pillars. The cost of the station building was shared between the Wycombe Railway and the Aylesbury and Buckingham Railway; the original plans are in the local records office.

The current station buildings date from 1926, when the station was extensively rebuilt again; this time by the London and North Eastern Railway. Until nationalisation in 1948, Aylesbury station was operated by a joint committee whose constituents were also joint committees: the GWR & GCR Joint and the Metropolitan and GCR Joint; although the LNER had taken on the role of the former Great Central Railway in all three joint committees, they were not renamed.

==== Motive power depot ====
The Wycombe Railway opened a single-road engine shed to the west of the station in 1863, which was fifty feet in length. This was extended to the rear shortly afterwards and enlarged to a two-road shed by the Great Western Railway in 1871; in around 1893, the saw tooth roof was added on the original walls. The shed was closed on 16 June 1962 and was demolished in 1967.

A wooden water tank was positioned outside the locomotive shed from the station's opening, being replaced by a standard GWR water tank with decorative supports and coaling stage underneath in 1899; this itself was replaced by a Braithwaite tank in the mid-1950s.

The first mention of a locomotive at Aylesbury was of the broad-gauge loco Giraffe in 1863, a member of the Sun class.

=== 1930s to the present day ===
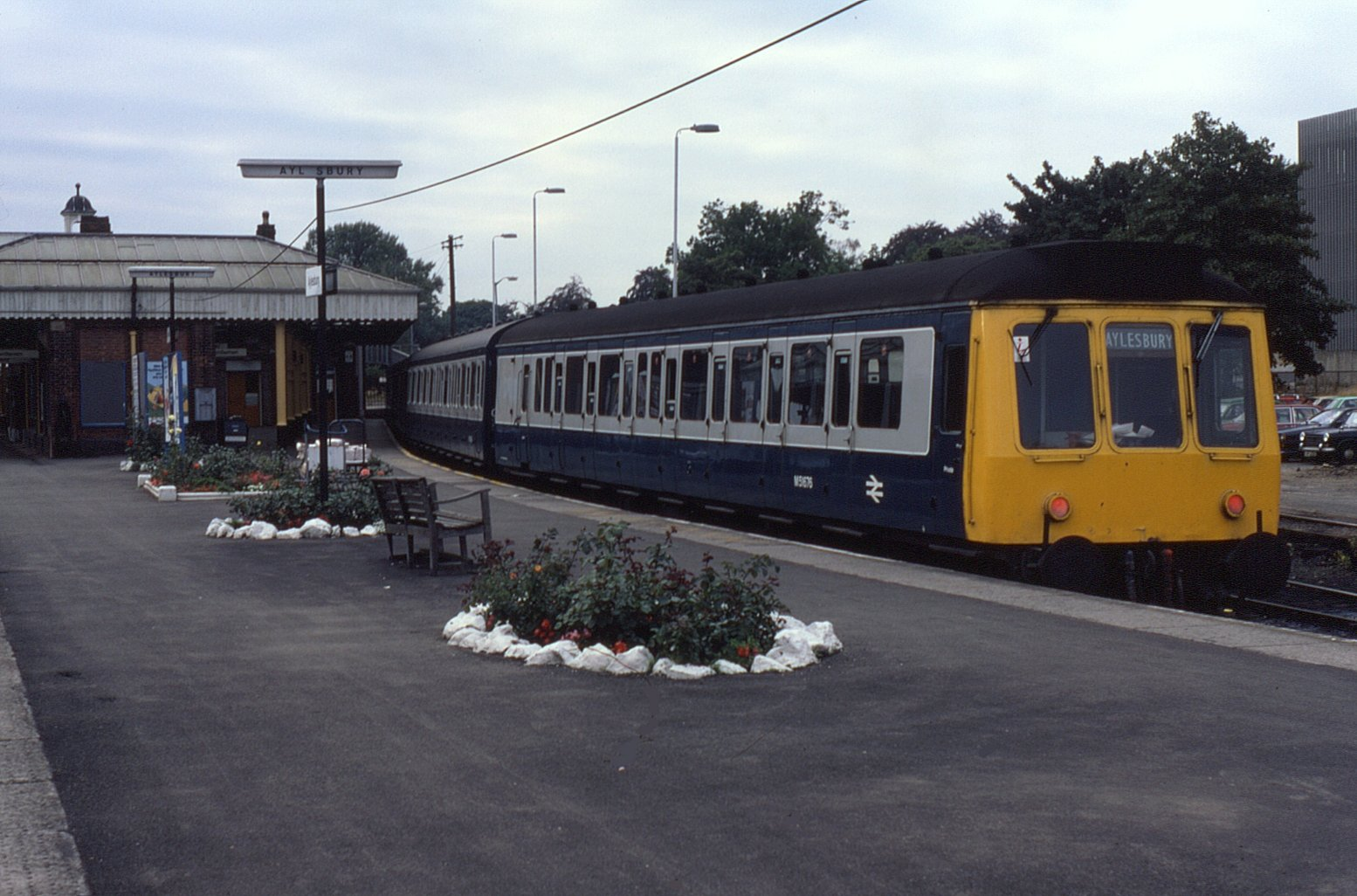
A Class 115 diesel multiple unit at the station, 1984

Until 1966, Aylesbury was an intermediate station on the former Great Central Main Line between London Marylebone and Sheffield Victoria and on to Manchester London Road, via the Woodhead Tunnel. Aylesbury was also on the Metropolitan Railway (later Metropolitan line) and through trains from Baker Street to Verney Junction operated until 1936. From 1948 to 1961, Aylesbury was the terminus of the Met's main line, on which trains had to change between electric and steam locomotives at Rickmansworth. (Note: Initially at least, the Metropolitan Railway labelled its line from Bishop's Road Paddington to Farringdon as the 'main line' and the line through St John's Wood and Swiss Cottage northwards as the 'branch'. Although the former lengthened to form the Hammersmith and City line, running from Hammersmith to Barking, the latter had the characteristics of a main line railway in the twentieth century, with locomotive-hauled trains of large bogie carriages, including Pullman cars for a time, running to Chesham, Aylesbury and Verney Junction.)

Following electrification from Rickmansworth to Amersham, Aylesbury was no longer served by London Underground trains. In 1966, British Railways closed the Great Central Main Line north of Aylesbury, leaving the town with commuter services to London only. From the 1960s until the 1980s, passenger trains at Aylesbury were almost exclusively operated by Class 115 diesel multiple units.

By the 1980s, the lines serving the town were in a poor state; Aylesbury station itself was run down and needed refurbishment. As part of the Chiltern Line Modernisation, Network SouthEast refurbished the lines out of Marylebone and Aylesbury received a new waiting room, new toilets and better lighting; platform 4 was closed and the car park was extended. A new drivers' staff room was established on platform 3 and a new heavy maintenance depot was built just north of the station. Aylesbury became the headquarters of the operational side of the Chiltern Line.

On 14 December 2008, 2 miles (3.2 km) of the line north of Aylesbury was reopened for passenger trains, with regular services running north of the station for the first time since 1966. This serves the new Aylesbury Vale Parkway station, which is situated on the north-western outskirts of the town.

== Layout ==
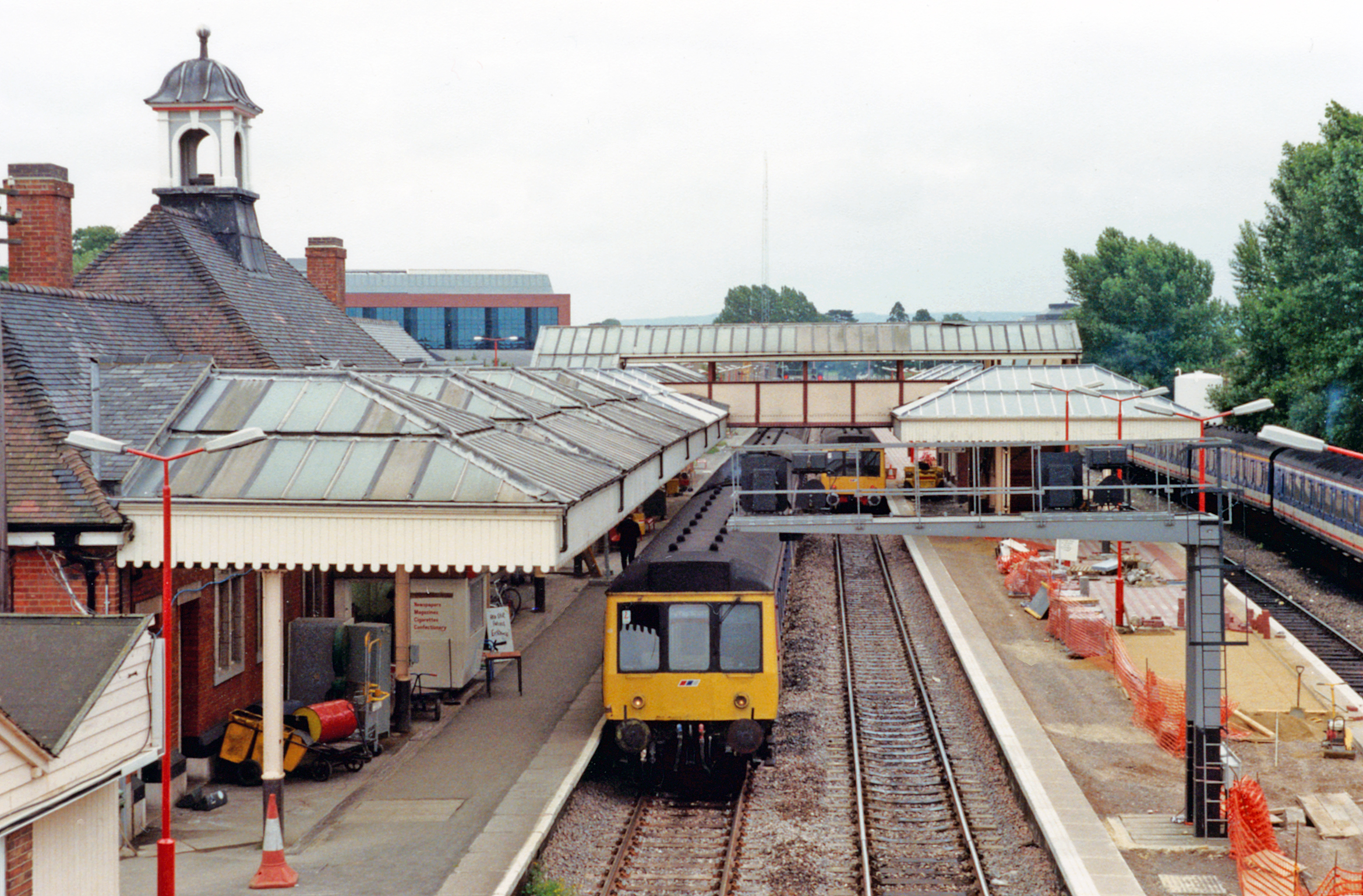
View of the platforms, 1991

Aylesbury station is laid out for through traffic, with hourly trains to/from Aylesbury Vale Parkway and waste freight trains to the landfill site at Calvert heading north. On selected days, usually bank holidays, special passenger services run to the Buckinghamshire Railway Centre at Quainton Road. In addition, there is a major repair and maintenance depot just north of the station, with several sidings.

There are three platforms:

1. for services to Princes Risborough and London Marylebone, via High Wycombe only
2. serves both routes.
3. for services to Amersham and London Marylebone only.

There was also a bay platform (platform 4) that served as the terminus for Metropolitan trains and several freight sidings, but the car park now lies on the trackbed and bike racks occupy the platform.

The goods depot was to the west of the station and was demolished in the 1960s. Modern apartments now occupy the site.

== Facilities ==
The station is managed by Chiltern Railways, which has automatic ticket gates installed. The ticket office is open from the early morning to the early evening, seven days a week; there are also two self-service ticket machines. A car park with 301 spaces and bicycle storage is available, with a taxi rank outside the station. All three platforms have step-free access, with access to platforms 1 and 2 via a pair of lifts.

== Services ==
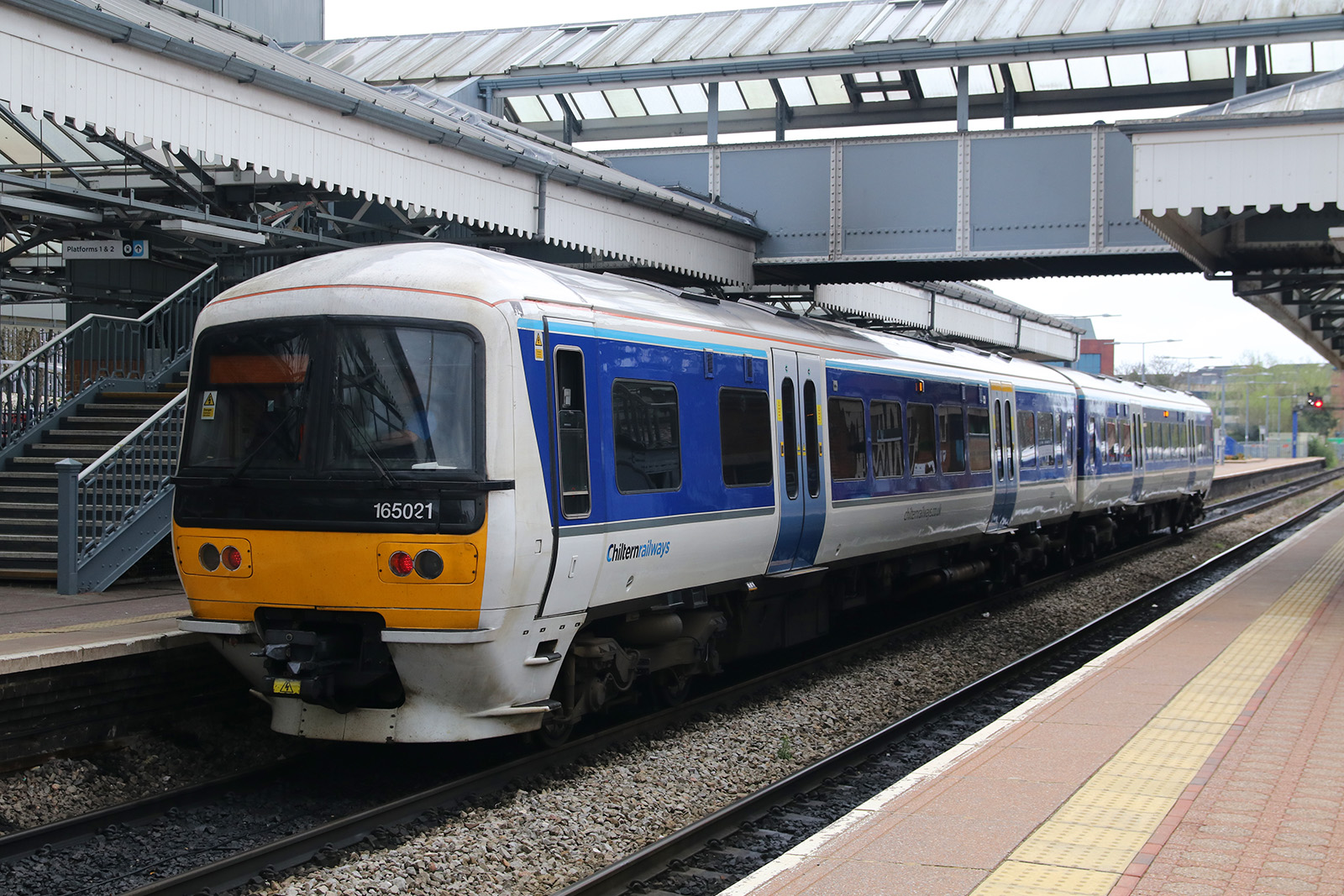
A Class 165 diesel multiple unit at the station, 2023

All services at Aylesbury are operated by Chiltern Railways. Most services operate to London Marylebone, although services can take one of two routes running via either Amersham on the London-Aylesbury line or via the Aylesbury–Princes Risborough line, High Wycombe and the Chiltern Main Line.

The current off-peak service is:

- 2 tph to London Marylebone, via Amersham
- 1 tph to London Marylebone, via High Wycombe
- 1 tph to Aylesbury Vale Parkway.

During peak hours, additional shuttle services run to and from Princes Risborough; there are additional services to/from London via the London-Aylesbury line that do not call at some of the stations nearer London, which are shared with the Metropolitan line.

On Sundays, services on the London-Aylesbury line are reduced to hourly. During bank holidays in spring and summer, there is a frequent shuttle service to Quainton Road.

Preceding station	National Rail	Following station
Aylesbury Vale Parkway	Chiltern Railways London–Aylesbury line	Stoke Mandeville
Terminus	Chiltern Railways Aylesbury–Princes Risborough line	Little Kimble
Disused railways
Waddesdon; Line and station closed	Great Central Railway; London Extension	Stoke Mandeville; Line and station open
Preceding station	London Underground	Following station
Terminus	Metropolitan Railway; 1892-1896	Stoke Mandeville
Quainton Road	Metropolitan Railway; 1896-1897	Stoke Mandeville
Waddesdon	Metropolitan Railway; 1897-1936	Stoke Mandeville
Terminus	Metropolitan line 1936-1943	Stoke Mandeville towards Baker Street or Aldgate
Quainton Road Terminus	Metropolitan line 1943-1948	Stoke Mandeville towards Baker Street or Aldgate
Terminus	Metropolitan line 1948-1960	Stoke Mandeville towards Baker Street or Aldgate

== Onward connections ==
Aylesbury bus station is a two-minute walk from the station. The majority of bus routes are operated by Arriva Herts & Essex, which connect the town with several destinations across Buckinghamshire, Hertfordshire and Oxfordshire, including Stoke Mandeville Hospital, Milton Keynes, Oxford, Tring, Hemel Hempstead, Watford, Luton and Leighton Buzzard.

The Aylesbury–Princes Risborough line offers connections to High Wycombe, Bicester North, Banbury and Birmingham Moor Street. This route was greatly improved by Project Evergreen, the redualling and speeding-up of Marylebone–Risborough-Birmingham track and services. Since 2015, Risborough has also had access to direct Oxford trains, via a new junction at Bicester Village.

== East West Rail connection ==
In 2004, a regional planning guidance report, written by consultants for Buckinghamshire County Council concerning the development of Aylesbury Vale, recommended further expansion of rail services to Bletchley and Bedford. As part of the plan to reinstate the Oxford-Cambridge route, these services would be extended from the current freight-only line north of Aylesbury Vale Parkway to the new line via Claydon LNE Junction and terminate at Milton Keynes Central or Bedford. The Department for Transport endorsed the scheme in December 2017, with opening planned for 2024. However, in November 2020 it was reported that the Aylesbury leg may be dropped from the first phase.

In March 2021, the East West Rail Company announced that its opening plans for the line had changed, notably deferring indefinitely a connection to Aylesbury.

== See also ==
- Aylesbury High Street railway station
- Cheddington to Aylesbury Line
