= Calvert, Buckinghamshire =

Village in Buckinghamshire, England

Coordinates: 51.91452°N 1.00166°W

Calvert
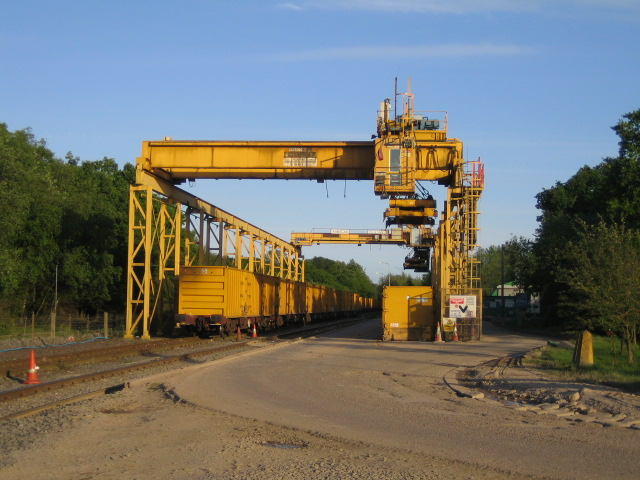
- Waste transfer station, Calvert Landfill Site, Calvert, 2007

- Location within Buckinghamshire
- OS grid reference: SP6824
- Civil parish: Charndon
- Unitary authority: Buckinghamshire
- Ceremonial county: Buckinghamshire
- Region: South East
- Country: England
- Sovereign state: United Kingdom
- Post town: BUCKINGHAM
- Postcode district: MK18
- Dialling code: 01296
- Police: Thames Valley
- Fire: Buckinghamshire
- Ambulance: South Central
- UK Parliament: Mid Buckinghamshire
- Website: Calvert Green website

Calvert is a village in Buckinghamshire, England, near the village of Steeple Claydon.

Originally named after a wealthy local family who had inherited property at Claydon House, Middle Claydon, on condition that they changed their surname to Verney, the village was founded as a hamlet in the Victorian era to house workers for the brick works that were constructed in the area. The Calvert Brickworks was opened in 1900 by Arthur Werner Itter, a brickmaker from the Peterborough area. The brickworks closed in 1991 and turned into a nature reserve (Calvert Jubilee) and landfill. All that remains of the original hamlet is a small group of red brick terrace houses.

At the start of the 21st century a new housing estate was built called Calvert Green, greatly enlarging the original village. In 2007 Calvert Green was detached from Charndon and formed into a new civil parish. At the 2011 Census the population of the village was still included in the civil parish of Charndon.

== Former claypits ==
Three of the former clay pits for the brickworks have become flooded. One is called Grebe Lake, and is used for sailing, boating, angling and kayaking. One is called Itter's Pit, and is used for angling, mainly for carp and pike by the Calvert Angling Club, but also contains perch, roach, rudd and catfish. The other pit is a nature reserve for wildfowl.

Another of the clay pits is now a landfill site. Waste is collected from Bristol, Bath and London each day and transported using rail via Aylesbury to Calvert. The site has a power station capable of producing 14 MWe of electricity from landfill gas, coming from the decomposition of organic matter to convert it into renewable electricity MW.

== Railways ==
The Buckinghamshire Railway opened its east–west route between Oxford and Bletchley in 1851, passing just north of the village; a route which would later become known as the Varsity Line as it continued to Cambridge. Stations were provided nearby at Claydon and Marsh Gibbon, but not at Calvert. In 1899 the Great Central Railway built its north–south main line to London Marylebone past the village and opened Calvert railway station. British Railways closed Calvert station in 1964.

The east–west Varsity Line continued in operation until 1967 before services were withdrawn and the route mothballed, thereafter seeing only occasional traffic, with the last service operating in 1993. The East West Rail project, announced in 2011, is expected to see the line reopen in 2025, with the closest station at Winslow.

The currently under construction High Speed 2 (HS2) will run along the Great Central Railway north–south corridor in this area, to the east of Calvert. The phase one Infrastructure Maintenance Depot will be located north of Calvert. No passenger interchange between East West Rail and HS2 is proposed, since stopping high speed trains 'too often' reduces their high speed benefits, although in February 2017, the local MP called for the station to be built at the junction between East West Rail and the HS2 line, serving both lines.

== Trunk roads ==
Calvert sits in the strip of land which the Government announced in 2018 as its 'preferred route' for the new Oxford-Cambridge Expressway road, which would link the A34, M40, and M1 trunk roads. It has been noted that the convergence of HS2, East-West Rail, and the Oxford-Cambridge Expressway at this location would offer opportunities for future provision of a key regional facility, such as an airport, or a New Town
