= Amersham station =

Railway station in Buckinghamshire, England

Amersham
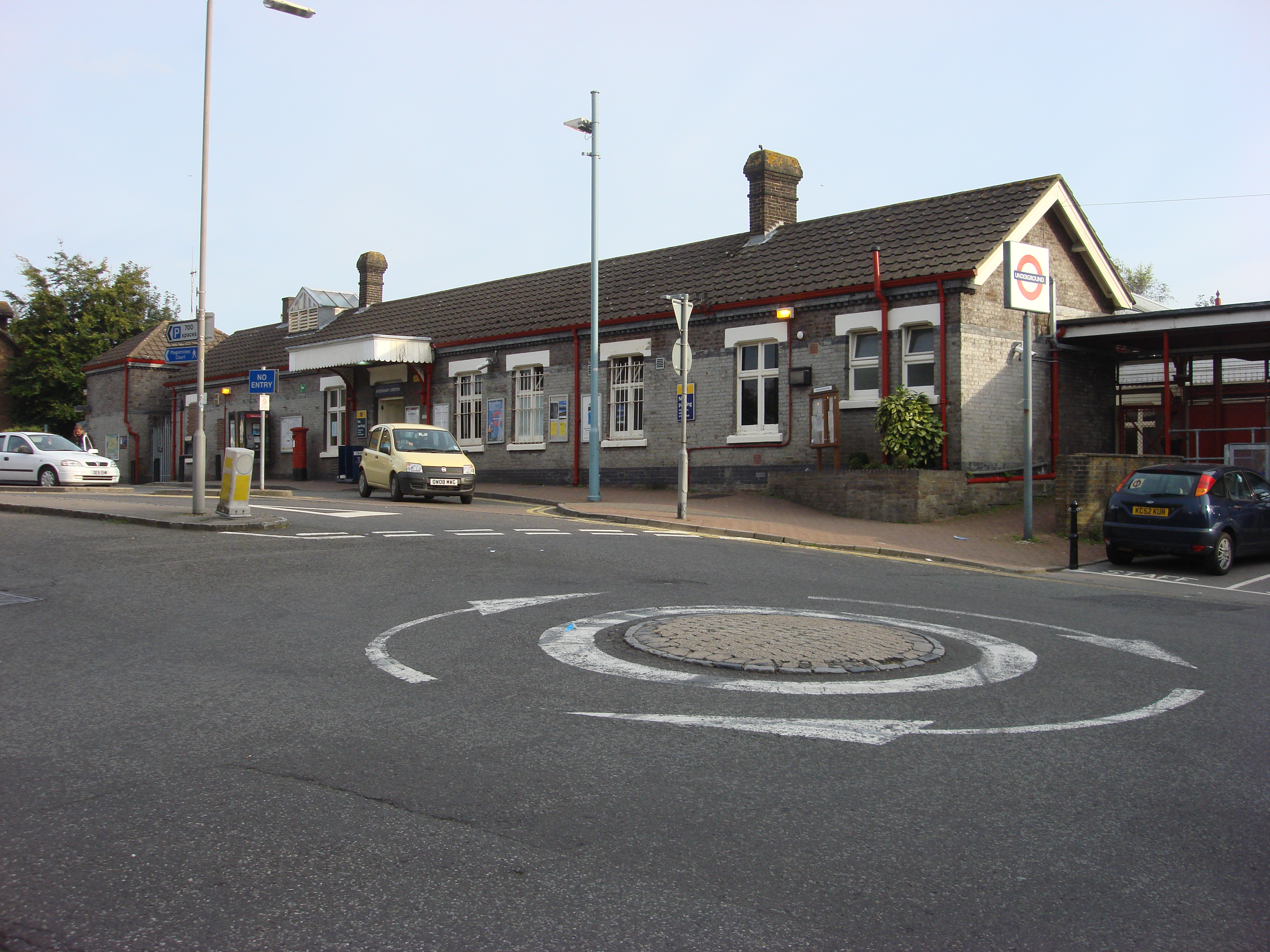
- Station entrance
- Interactive map of Amersham

General information
- Location: Amersham
- Local authority: Buckinghamshire
- Managed by: London Underground
- Station code: AMR
- Number of platforms: 3
- Accessible: Yes
- Fare zone: 9

London Underground annual entry and exit
- 2020: ▼0.86 million
- 2021: ▲0.95 million
- 2022: ▲1.66 million
- 2023: ▲1.73 million
- 2024: ▲1.82 million

National Rail annual entry and exit
- 2020–21: ▼0.451 million
- 2021–22: ▲1.140 million
- 2022–23: ▲1.563 million
- 2023–24: ▲1.767 million
- 2024–25: ▲1.893 million

Key dates
- 1892: Opened
- 4 July 1966: Goods yard closed

Other information
- External links: TfL station info page; Departures; Facilities
- Coordinates: 51.674°N 0.607°W

Amersham (/ˈæmərʃəm/) is a London Underground and National Rail station in the market town of Amersham, Buckinghamshire, England. It is a terminus of the London Underground's Metropolitan line and a stop on the London-Aylesbury line. It lies 23.7 miles (38.1 km) north-west of Charing Cross, making it the second furthest Underground station from Central London and the second most-westerly station of the whole network, after Chesham. It lies in London fare zone 9.

The station has the highest elevation on the entire London Underground network at 147 m (482 ft) above sea-level, higher than the Big Ben tower.

== History ==
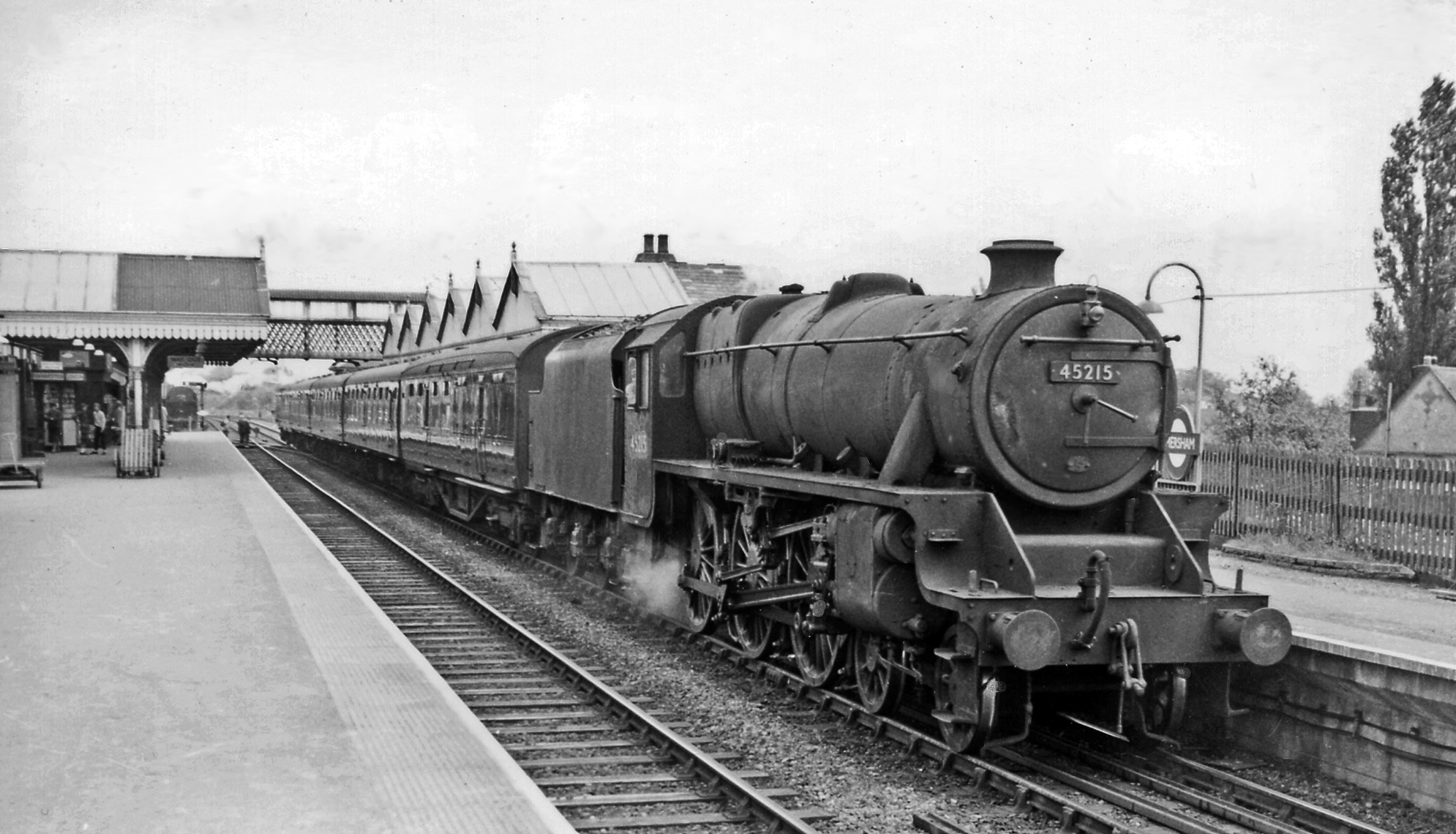
Marylebone - Woodford Halse stopping train in 1959

The station was opened on 1 September 1892 as part of the Metropolitan Railway (Met) extension from Chalfont Road (now Chalfont & Latimer) to Aylesbury. On 12 March 1922, its name was changed to Amersham & Chesham Bois, but the original name was restored during 1937.

From 16 March 1899, the Great Central Railway served the station through its extension to Marylebone. Consequently, the station became joint Met/GCR owned. On 1 January 1923, the GCR became part of the London and North Eastern Railway (LNER) under the Railways Act 1921 and, on 1 July 1933, the Met became part of the London Passenger Transport Board (LPTB), becoming the Metropolitan line of the London Underground. On 1 January 1948, the LNER was nationalised, its share of the station initially coming under the control of the Eastern Region of British Railways, before being transferred to the London Midland Region in 1958.

On 12 September 1960, the tracks from Rickmansworth to Amersham were electrified, partially fulfilling plans first proposed some thirty years earlier. The rolling stock ordered by London Underground as part of this project, the A60 stock, is named after Amersham.

=== Service changes ===
When the sectorisation of British Rail took place in 1982, services to Aylesbury on what had by now become the London to Aylesbury Line came under the operation of Network SouthEast. Following the privatisation of British Rail, these services have been provided by Chiltern Railways since 1996.

From December 2010, off-peak Metropolitan line services to and from Amersham were reduced to two per hour, with a corresponding increase in through services on the Chesham branch. This is a return to the historically normal frequency of two Metropolitan trains per hour from the four Metropolitan trains per hour service that had been operating for the previous five years. Including the Chiltern Railways services, Amersham still has four trains an hour to London in total, with extra trains from both operators at peak hours. Metropolitan line services are divided 50:50 between Amersham and Chesham. This is expected to divide park and ride or kiss and ride motorist users more evenly between the two stations and help spread the load on local roads, though the change was made purely for operational reasons.

== Facilities ==
In 2009, because of financial constraints, Transport for London (TfL) decided to stop work on a project to provide step-free access at Amersham and five other stations, on the grounds that these are relatively quiet stations and some are already one or two stops away from an existing step-free station. (Note: The next station towards London, Chalfont & Latimer, and Chesham station, around 2 miles (3.2 km) north, both have step-free access.) In 2017, TfL announced that Amersham station would receive funding for step-free access, and that work would begin in 2018. It was opened in February 2021.

Ticket barriers are in operation at the station.

== Services ==
Services at Amersham are operated by Chiltern Railways and London Underground; the general off-peak service in trains hour (tph) is:

- Underground 2 tph to Aldgate (calling at all stations)
- Chiltern 2 tph to London Marylebone
- Chiltern 2 tph to Aylesbury; of which 1 continues to Aylesbury Vale Parkway.

| Preceding station | London Underground | Following station |
|---|---|---|
| Terminus | Metropolitan line Amersham branch | Chalfont & Latimer towards Baker Street or Aldgate |
| Preceding station | National Rail | Following station |
| Great Missenden | Chiltern Railways; London to Aylesbury Line | Chalfont & Latimer or London Marylebone |
Disused railways
| Preceding station | London Underground | Following station |
| Great Missenden towards Aylesbury | Metropolitan line | Chalfont & Latimer towards Baker Street or Aldgate |
