= Chalfont & Latimer station =

London Underground and railway station

Chalfont & Latimer
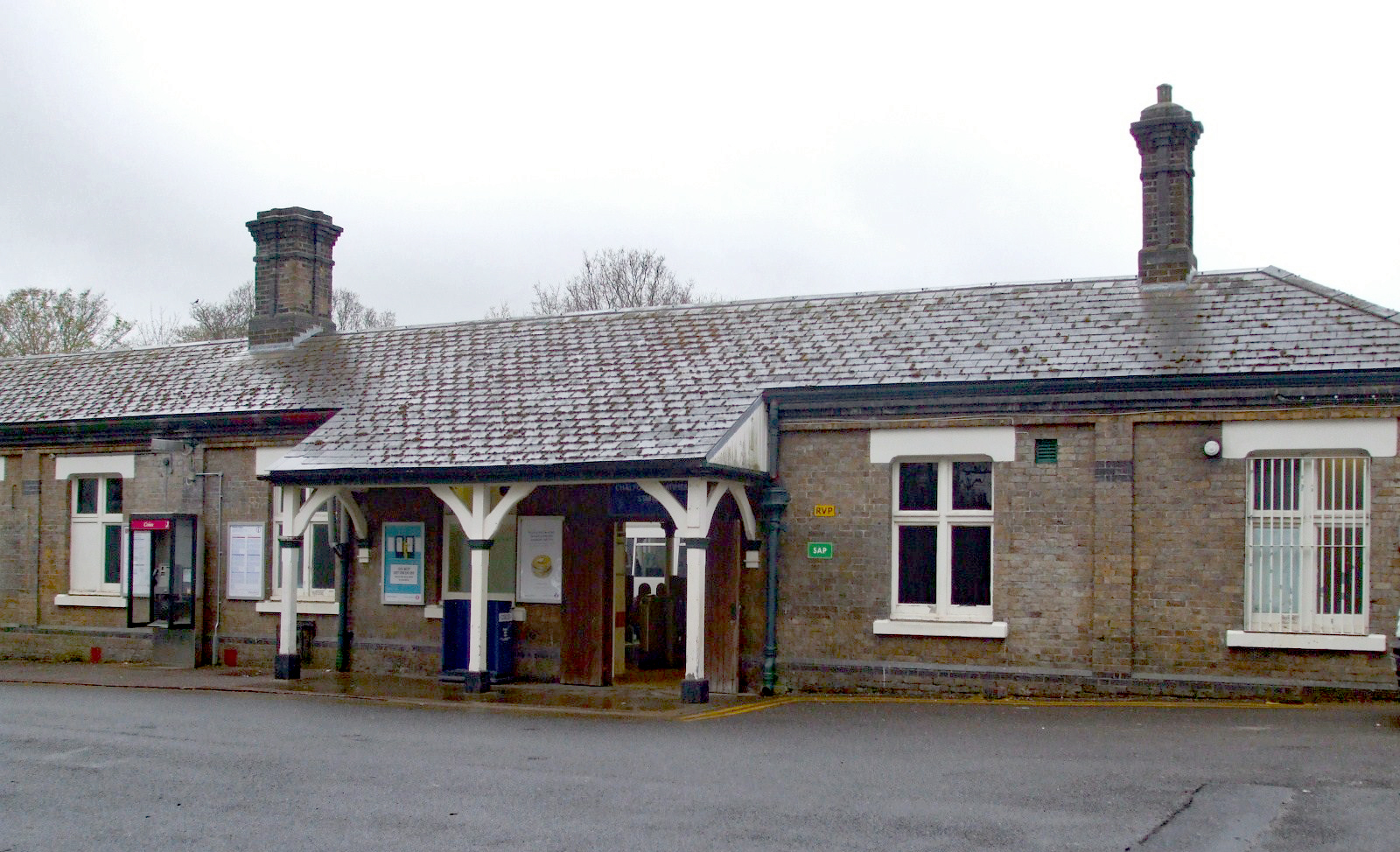
- Interactive map of Chalfont & Latimer

General information
- Location: Little Chalfont
- Local authority: Buckinghamshire
- Managed by: London Underground
- Station code: CFO
- Number of platforms: 3 (2 in use)
- Accessible: Yes
- Fare zone: 8

London Underground annual entry and exit
- 2021: ▼0.74 million
- 2022: ▲1.30 million
- 2023: ▲1.60 million
- 2024: ▼1.47 million
- 2025: ▲1.49 million

National Rail annual entry and exit
- 2020–21: ▼0.198 million
- 2021–22: ▲0.500 million
- 2022–23: ▲0.709 million
- 2023–24: ▲0.825 million
- 2024–25: ▼0.780 million

Key dates
- 1889: Opened
- 14 November 1966: Goods yard closed

Other information
- External links: TfL station info page; Departures; Facilities
- Coordinates: 51°40′04″N 0°33′40″W

Chalfont & Latimer is a London Underground and National Rail station in London fare zone 8 on the Metropolitan line, in Buckinghamshire. It also serves the Chiltern Railways line to Aylesbury. Chalfont & Latimer station is located just before the junction for trains to Chesham. The station serves Chalfont St Giles, Chalfont St Peter, Little Chalfont and Latimer. It is located in Little Chalfont. It opened as Chalfont Road on 8 July 1889 but changed to the present name on 1 November 1915.

== History ==
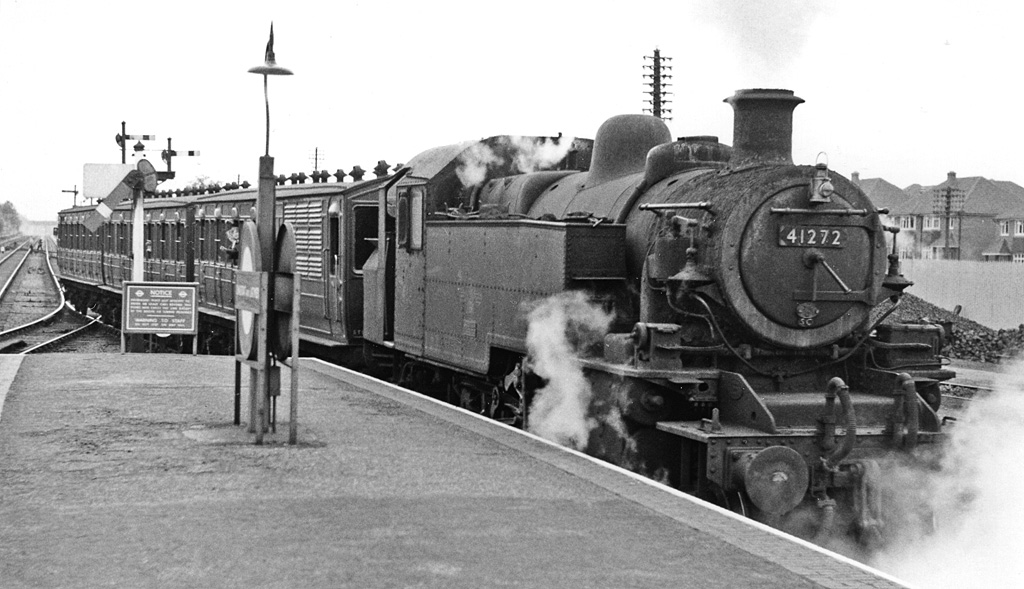
Autotrain for Chesham leaving Chalfont & Latimer Station in 1959

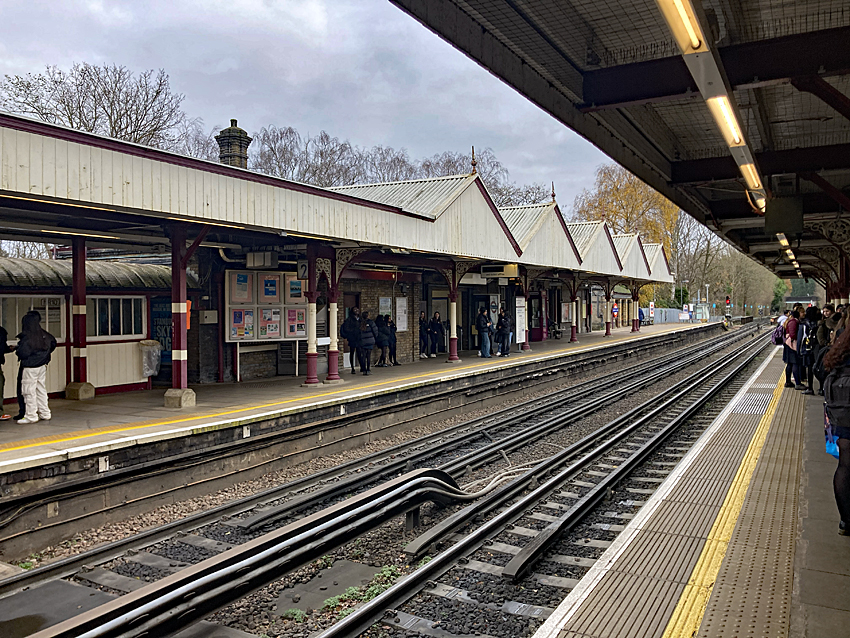
Chalfont & Latimer station platform view

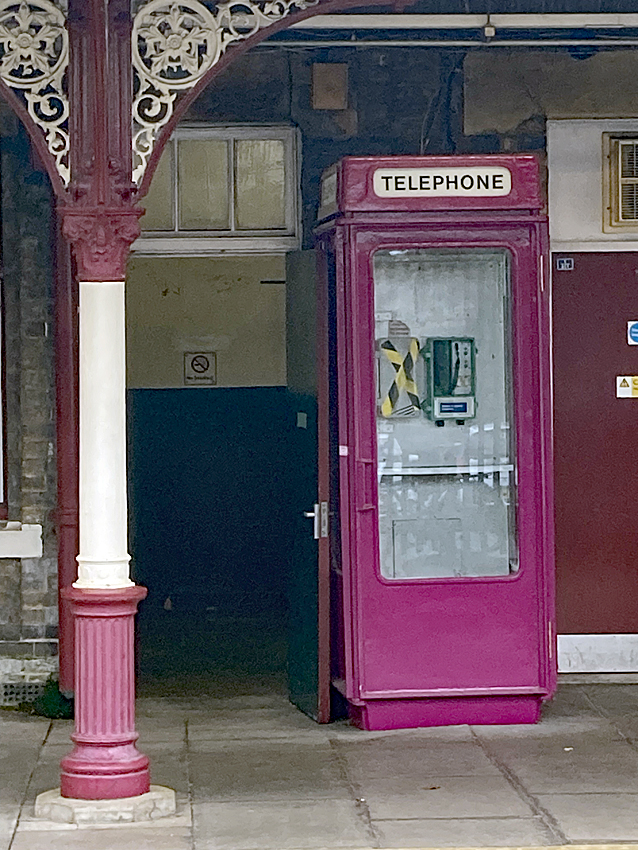
Listed K8 phone kiosk at Chalfont & Latimer station

Chalfont & Latimer station was formerly served by steam–hauled Metropolitan line trains with a changeover to an electric locomotive at Rickmansworth. The electrification north of Rickmansworth to Amersham and Chesham was completed in 1960, with steam trains being finally withdrawn in 1961. British Railways took over the operation of the service north of Amersham at the same time, using Class 115 diesel multiple unit trains. The station had a goods yard, which closed on 14 November 1966.

From 1961, Metropolitan line trains at Chalfont & Latimer were formed of A60 and A62 Stock. Prior to 11 December 2010, the Chesham branch was served by a single four-car shuttle train (using Chalfont & Latimer station's bay platform), except for two through trains in either direction during peak periods. From 12 December 2010, the Chesham service now consists of half hourly direct services formed of eight car S Stock trains being introduced at that time. Chiltern Railways (Aylesbury-Marylebone) trains are formed by Class 165 and Class 168 diesel multiple units.

On the up, south-bound platform is one of the few surviving K8 telephone kiosks. Now used for the TfL internal system, the kiosk is Grade II listed.

== Services ==
=== Metropolitan line ===
The Metropolitan line is the only line on the London Underground to operate an express service, though currently this is only southbound in the morning peaks and northbound in the evening peaks. Southbound fast trains run non-stop between Moor Park, Harrow-on-the-Hill and Finchley Road. Southbound semi-fast trains only run non-stop between Harrow-on-the-Hill and Finchley Road. Northbound fast and semi-fast trains call additionally at Wembley Park before running non-stop between the aforementioned stations.

The off-peak service in trains per hour (tph) presently consists of:

- 4tph to Aldgate (all stations)
- 2tph to Amersham
- 2tph to Chesham

The morning peak service in trains per hour (tph) presently consists of:

- 4tph to Aldgate (fast)
- 2tph to Aldgate (semi-fast)
- 4tph to Amersham
- 2tph to Chesham

The evening service in trains per hour (tph) presently consists of:

- 2tph to Baker Street (all stations)
- 4tph to Aldgate via Baker Street (all stations)
- 4tph to Amersham
- 2tph to Chesham

=== Chiltern Railways ===
Chiltern Railways operate services between London Marylebone and Aylesbury Vale Parkway via Harrow-on-the-Hill station.

Harrow-on-the-Hill is Chiltern Railway's only station between London Marylebone and Rickmansworth.

The off-peak service in trains per hour (tph) presently consists of:

- 2tph to London Marylebone
- 1tph to Aylesbury
- 1tph to Aylesbury Vale Parkway via Aylesbury

| Preceding station | London Underground | Following station |
|---|---|---|
| Chesham Terminus | Metropolitan line | Chorleywood towards Baker Street or Aldgate |
| Amersham Terminus | Metropolitan line | Chorleywood towards Baker Street or Aldgate |
| Preceding station | National Rail | Following station |
| Amersham | Chiltern Railways; London to Aylesbury Line | Chorleywood |

== Accidents and incidents ==
- On 21 June 2020, a Chiltern Railways train passed a signal at danger, stopped but then proceeded. It ran through and damaged trailing points and ended up running on the wrong line, stopping 23 metres (75 ft) short of a tube train at the station. The Rail Accident Investigation Branch report considered the likely cause of the incident was driver fatigue.
