= British Rail Class 115 =

British diesel multiple-unit passenger trains

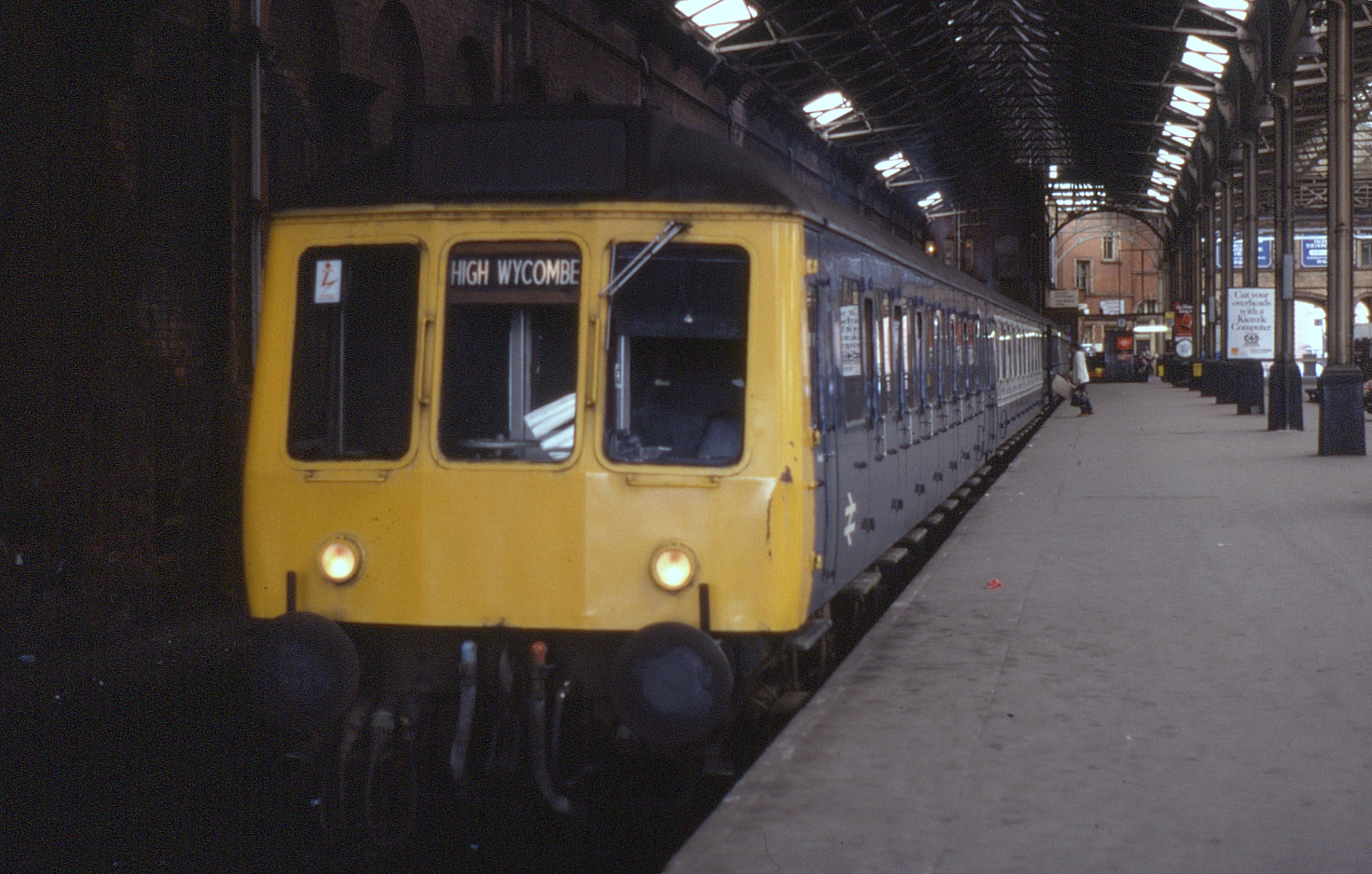
- A Class 115 at Marylebone in 1981
- In service: 1960–1998
- Manufacturer: BR Derby
- Family name: First generation
- Replaced: Steam locomotives and carriages
- Number built: 41 four-car sets
- Number preserved: 15 cars 9 (DMBS) 4 (TCL) 2 (TS)
- Successor: Class 165
- Formation: DMBS–TCL–TS–DMBS
- Capacity: DMBS: 78 Second; TCL 30 First, 40 Second; TS: 106 Second; 4-car total: 30 First, 302 Second
- Operator: British Rail
- Lines served: Chiltern Main Line, London to Aylesbury Line

Specifications
- Car length: 63 ft 6 in (19.35 m)
- Width: 9 ft 3 in (2.82 m)
- Maximum speed: 70 mph (110 km/h)
- Weight: 135 long tons (137 t; 151 short tons) trainset
- Prime mover: Two 230 hp (172 kW) BUT (Leyland Albion) per DMBS
- Power output: 920 hp (686 kW) per set
- Auxiliaries: Albion
- Safety systems: AWS, Tripcock
- Multiple working: ■ Blue Square
- Track gauge: 4 ft 8 1/2 in (1,435 mm)

The British Rail Class 115 diesel multiple units were 41 high-density sets which operated the outer-suburban services from Marylebone usually to destinations such as High Wycombe, Aylesbury and Banbury which are on the Chiltern Main Line and Great Central Main Line (now the London to Aylesbury Line). Sometimes, these sets used to operate 8- or 12-car-long expresses to Nottingham Victoria in the final years of the GCML. Coincidentally, Class 115 units operated services under Table 115 in the British Rail timetable.

== Construction and service ==
Based on the basic Derby high density design, the sets are similar to Class 127 but were internally superior as the class had larger windows, better furnishings, lighting and wall surfaces.

41 sets were built for the outer suburban services out of London Marylebone, while another six sets were built for the Cheshire Lines Committee (CLC) line between Liverpool and Manchester, where in 1960 they replaced steam haulage on the limited stop services via Warrington. These units lasted on the CLC until around 1987.

Class 115 units also worked from Tyseley in the later years, to operate on the Cross-City Line.

The Marylebone sets, which were later transferred to Bletchley but remained on Chiltern Line duties (and finally to Old Oak Common), were declared surplus after the introduction of Class 165s, from 1991 onwards. While at Bletchley and Old Oak Common depots the class found use on the Gospel Oak to Barking line, units being formed as power twins. They were, in turn, replaced on this line by Class 117 power twins, displaced from Paddington suburban duties.

The final class 115 working out of Marylebone was on 29 July 1992. The Tyseley vehicles survived a bit longer, until February 1994.

Some of the class briefly found their way on to the Redhill to Tonbridge Line to replace ageing DEMU sets. The line was electrified in 1993, in order to allow a diversionary route for the Eurostar, and the class 115s were replaced initially with 4CEP EMUs, then ex-Merseyrail Class 508 EMUs in 1998 (after privatisation).

Table of orders and numbers
Lot No.	Type	Diagram	Qty	Fleet numbers	Notes
30530	Driving Motor Brake Second (DMBS)	598	30	51651–51680	
30531	Trailer Open Second (TS)	590	15	59649–59663	
30532	Trailer Composite with lavatory (TCL)	599	15	59664–59678	
30595	Driving Motor Brake Second (DMBS)	598	12	51849–51860	
30596	Trailer Open Second (TS)	590	6	59713–59718	
30597	Trailer Composite with lavatory (TCL)	599	6	59719–59724	
30598	Driving Motor Brake Second (DMBS)	598	40	51861–51900	
30599	Trailer Open Second (TS)	590	20	59725–59744	
30600	Trailer Composite with lavatory (TCL)	599	20	59745–59764	

== Accidents and incidents ==
On 11 December 1981, two four-car Class 115 units were involved in a collision between Gerrards Cross and Seer Green. The driver of an empty stock train, traveling from Marylebone to Princes Risborough, had stopped in the cutting between Gerrards Cross and Seer Green, to clear tree branches that were overhanging and had fallen onto the track, due to very heavy snow fall. Behind the empty stock train, a passenger train travelling from Marylebone to Banbury, was, incorrectly, authorised to pass a signal at danger at Gerrards Cross, entering the same section of track and partially telescoped the stationary train. Four people were killed, including the driver of the passenger train, and five others were seriously injured.

== Technical details ==
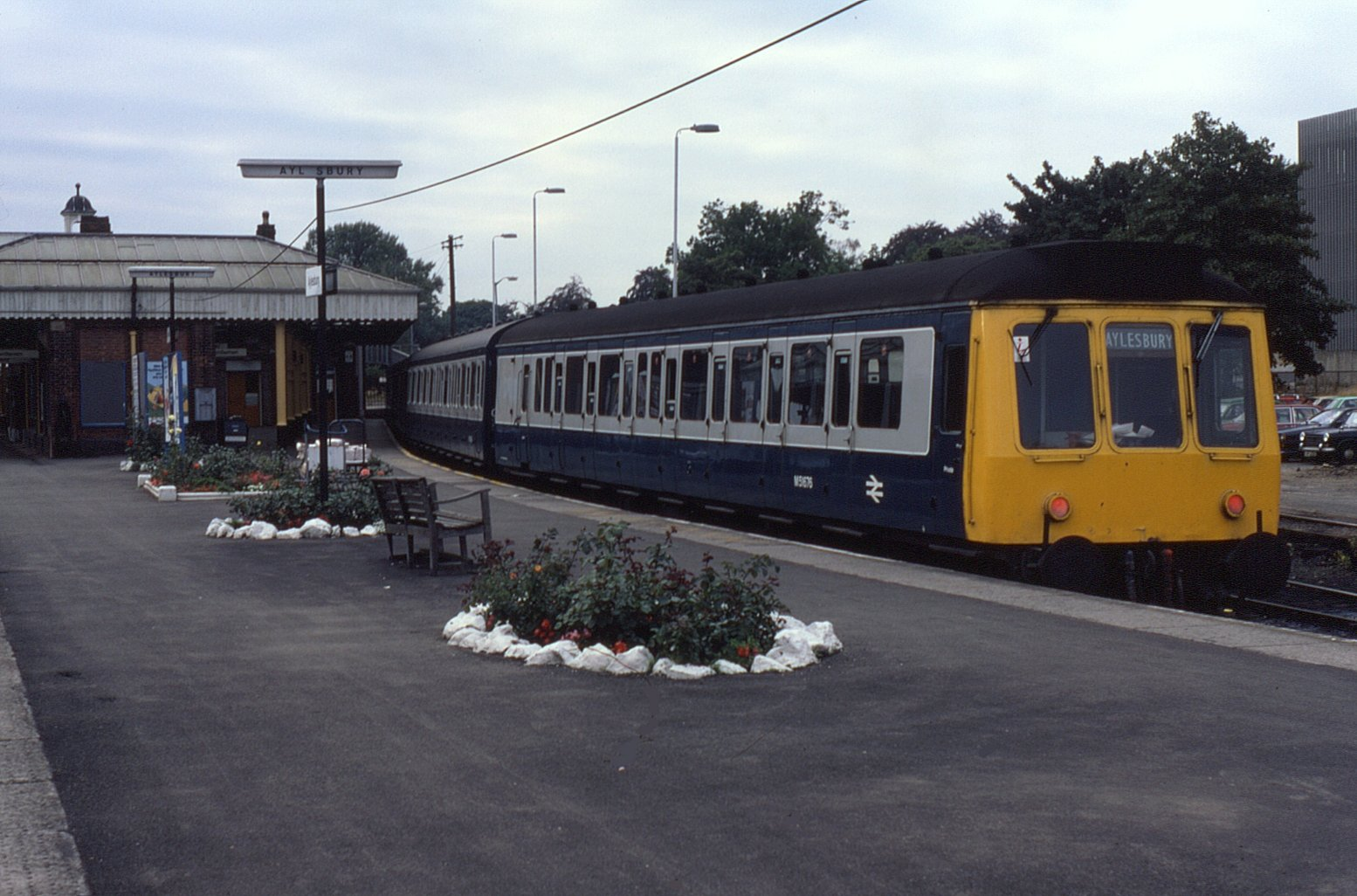
A Class 115 at Aylesbury in 1984.

- Builder: BR Derby
- Introduced: 1960
- Coupling Code: Blue Square
- Body: 63 ft 6 in (19.35 m) × 9 ft 3 in (2.82 m)
- Engines: BUT (Leyland Albion) of 230 hp (172 kW) (2 per DMBS)
- Transmission: Standard mechanical
- Weight: DMBS 38 long tons (39 t; 43 short tons); TCL 30 long tons (30 t; 34 short tons); TS 29 long tons (29 t; 32 short tons)

== Preservation ==
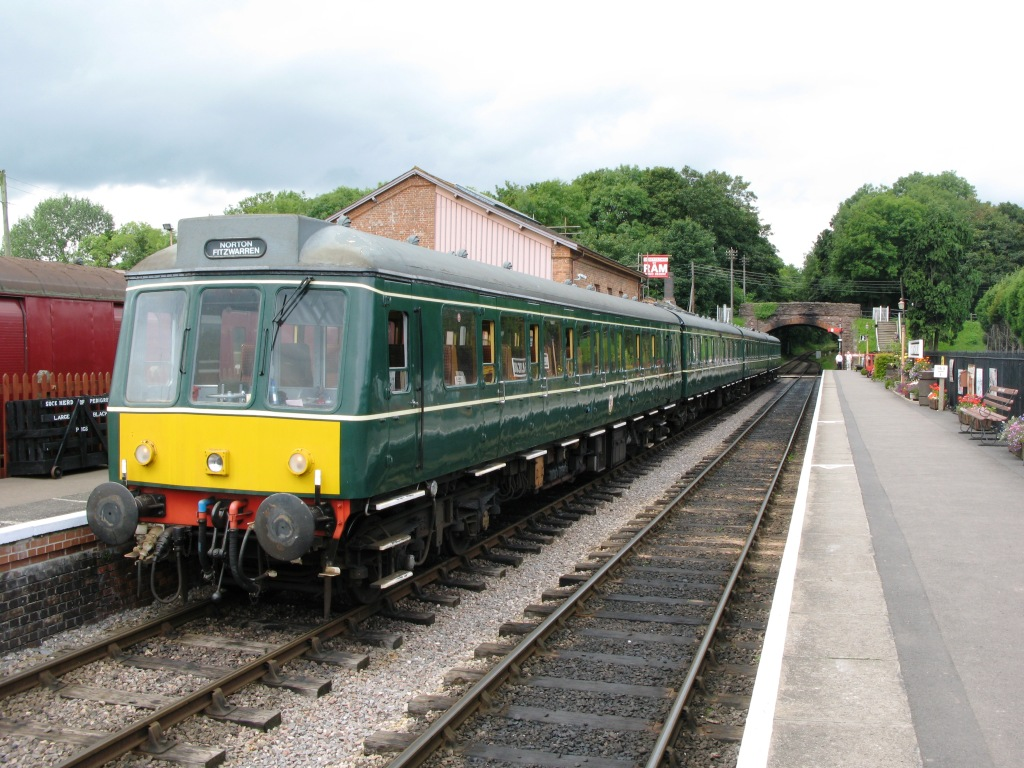
A set preserved on the West Somerset Railway

15 vehicles are preserved. DMBS 51677 was scrapped in early 2017.

Set number	Vehicle numbers			Livery	Location	Notes
Set number	DMBS	TCL	DMBS	Livery	Location	Notes
-	51655	-	-	BR Green	Private Site	Static Display
-	51669	-	-	BR Green	Midland Railway - Butterley	Stored
-	51849	-	-	BR Green	Midland Railway - Butterley	Stored
-	51859	59678	51880	BR Green	West Somerset Railway	Operational
-	51886	59761	51899	BR Green	Buckinghamshire Railway Centre	Stored
-	51887	-	-	Blood and Custard	West Somerset Railway	Under Restoration
-	-	59659(TS)	-	BR Green	Midland Railway - Butterley	Stored
-	-	59664	-	BR Green	Midsomer Norton railway station	Under Restoration
-	-	59719	-	BR Green	Dartmouth Steam Railway	Operational
-	-	59740(TS)	-	BR lined maroon	South Devon Railway	Static - in use as Station Buffet at Staverton
-	51663	-	-		West Somerset Railway	Underframe only spare parts
