= Northwood tube station =

London Underground station

Northwood
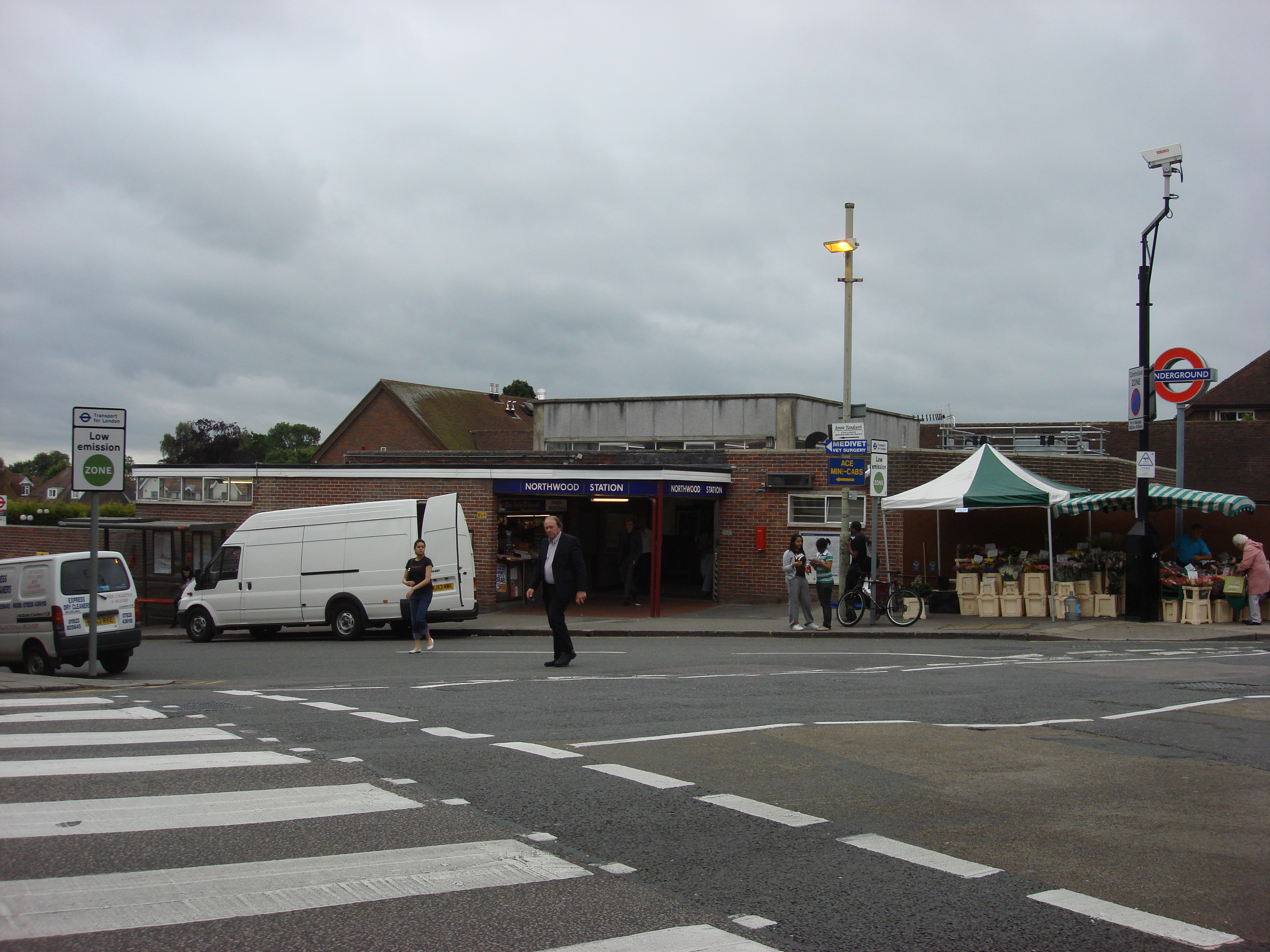
- Station entrance
- Interactive map of Northwood

General information
- Location: Northwood
- Local authority: London Borough of Hillingdon
- Managed by: London Underground
- Number of platforms: 2
- Fare zone: 6

London Underground annual entry and exit
- 2021: ▼1.27 million
- 2022: ▲2.04 million
- 2023: ▲2.16 million
- 2024: ▼2.10 million
- 2025: ▲2.11 million

Key dates
- 1 September 1887: Opened
- 14 November 1966: Goods yard closed

Other information
- External links: TfL station info page
- Coordinates: 51.6109°N 0.4244°W

Northwood is a London Underground station in Northwood, in the London Borough of Hillingdon. It is on the Metropolitan line between Moor Park and Northwood Hills stations and is in London fare zone 6. It is situated just off the main road through the town, Green Lane. The line serves as the sole continuous link between the town of Northwood and London, key for a region known as Metro-Land.

The station is located on a four-track section of the Metropolitan line. The two platforms are on the slow lines. There are no platforms on the fast lines, as fast services do not stop at this station.

== History ==
The station was opened on 1 September 1887 on the Metropolitan Railway's extension from the previous terminus at Pinner, en route to Rickmansworth. Northwood was rebuilt in the 1960s so that platforms would be on the Watford slow lines rather than the Amersham fast lines. In the original Crossrail plans, Crossrail would have connected to Aylesbury via the fast lines from Harrow to Rickmansworth and Northwood would have been an interchange with two extra platforms (meaning that the fast platforms at Moor Park would have been demolished) built on the fast lines. However, plans for this were dropped during the late 1990s.

Northwood used to be a terminus for many Metropolitan trains, similar to the status of Harrow-on-the-Hill and Neasden, due to the placement of two sidings. Nowadays when there are engineering works or delays near Northwood, trains would turn around there. The goods depot has been demolished, and the station car park has replaced it. The sidings were also a role to load A60/A62 Stock and C69/C77 Stock trains onto lorries, where they went to scrap.

=== 1945 accident ===
On 31 December 1945, two Metropolitan line trains collided in fog between Northwood and Northwood Hills. The driver of the second train had passed a danger signal under the "Stop and Proceed" rule but did not see the preceding train soon enough to stop; the Inspecting Officer concluded that he was travelling too fast, though at reduced speed. Two coaches of the front train were partly telescoped. A fire was started by electrical arcing; traction current could not be cut off for 12 minutes as short-circuiting bars and tunnel wires were not available on open-air trains and sections. 3 people trapped in the damaged compartments were killed due to smoke inhalation.

== Services ==
Northwood station is on the Metropolitan line in London fare zone 6. It is between Moor Park to the north and Northwood Hills to the south. In the northbound direction, the station is served by trains to Watford (4tph), Amersham (2tph) and Chesham (2tph) trains (at peak times, 'fast' trains do not stop at stations between Harrow-on-the-Hill and Moor Park). In the southbound direction, off-peak services generally run 4tph to Baker Street and 4tph to Aldgate.

Preceding station	London Underground	Following station
Moor Park towards Watford, Chesham or Amersham	Metropolitan line	Northwood Hills towards Baker Street or Aldgate

== Connections ==
London Buses routes serve the station.
