= Northwood Hills tube station =

London Underground station

Northwood Hills
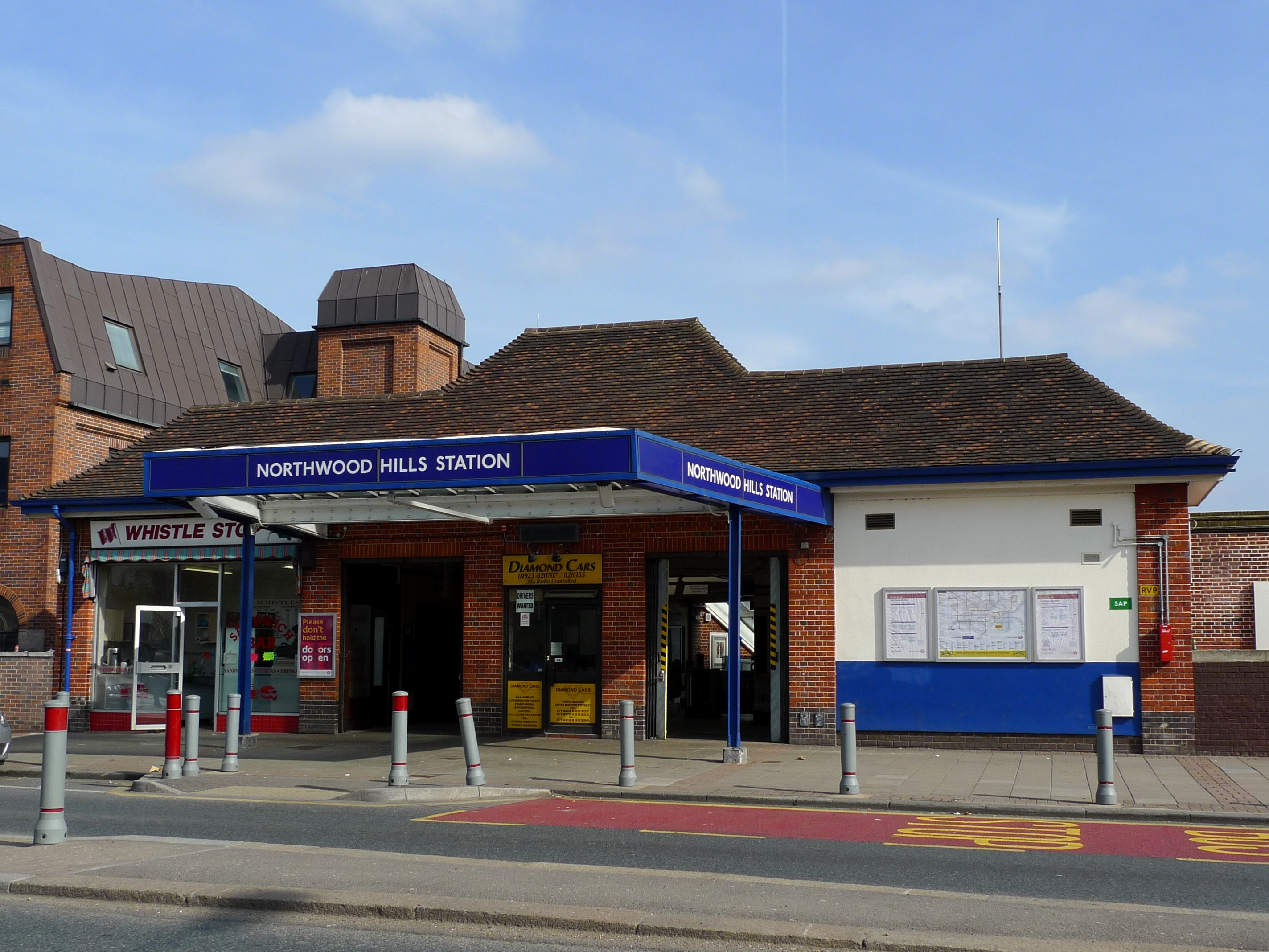
- Station entrance
- Interactive map of Northwood Hills

General information
- Location: Northwood Hills
- Local authority: London Borough of Hillingdon
- Managed by: London Underground
- Number of platforms: 2
- Fare zone: 6

London Underground annual entry and exit
- 2021: ▼0.83 million
- 2022: ▲1.34 million
- 2023: ▲1.41 million
- 2024: ▼1.34 million
- 2025: ▲1.47 million

Railway companies
- Original company: Metropolitan and Great Central Joint Railway
- Post-grouping: Metropolitan and Great Central Joint Railway

Key dates
- 13 November 1933: Station opened

Other information
- External links: TfL station info page
- Coordinates: 51.60056°N 0.40917°W

Northwood Hills is a London Underground station in Northwood, in the London Borough of Hillingdon. It is on the Metropolitan line, between Northwood and Pinner stations. It is in London fare zone 6.

== History ==
The station opened on 13 November 1933. There was a competition for the name and Northwood Hills, suggested by a woman from North Harrow was the winning entry. The area is lower than Northwood, despite the name.

== Services ==
Northwood Hills station is on the Metropolitan line in London fare zone 6. It is between Northwood to the north and Pinner to the south. In the northbound direction, the station is served by trains to Watford (4tph), Amersham (2tph) and Chesham (2tph) trains (at peak times, 'fast' trains do not stop at stations between Harrow-on-the-Hill and Moor Park). In the southbound direction, off-peak services generally run 2tph to Wembley Park, 4tph to Baker Street, and 4tph to Aldgate.

Preceding station	London Underground	Following station
Northwood towards Watford, Chesham or Amersham	Metropolitan line	Pinner towards Baker Street or Aldgate

== Connections ==
London Buses routes 282, H11 (alighting at Northwood Hills Circus) and H13 serve the station.
