= North Harrow tube station =

London Underground station

North Harrow
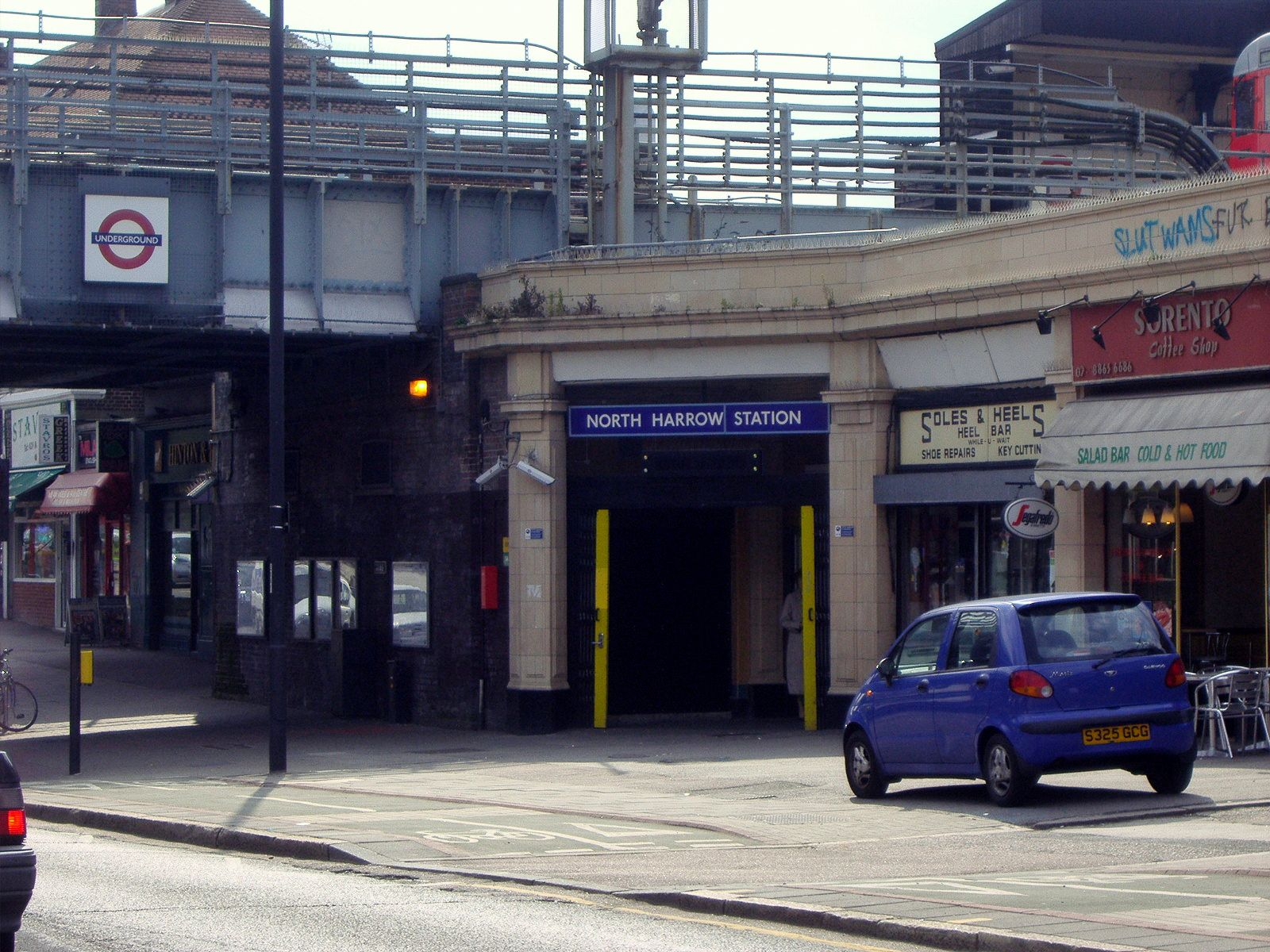
- Station entrance
- Interactive map of North Harrow

General information
- Location: Harrow
- Local authority: London Borough of Harrow
- Managed by: London Underground
- Number of platforms: 2
- Fare zone: 5

London Underground annual entry and exit
- 2021: ▼0.77 million
- 2022: ▲1.31 million
- 2023: ▲1.40 million
- 2024: ▲1.42 million
- 2025: ▲1.48 million

Railway companies
- Original company: Metropolitan and Great Central Joint Railway
- Pre-grouping: Metropolitan and Great Central Joint Railway
- Post-grouping: Metropolitan and Great Central Joint Railway

Key dates
- 25 May 1885: Line opened
- 22 March 1915: Station opened

Other information
- External links: TfL station info page
- Coordinates: 51.58500°N 0.36250°W

North Harrow is a London Underground station situated in North Harrow, north-west London. It is on the Metropolitan line, between Pinner and Harrow-on-the-Hill stations. The station is in London fare zone 5. It has won Transport for London awards for best customer service in 2009 and 2010.

== History ==
The Metropolitan Railway began running services through here on 25 May 1885 with the opening of its Pinner extension. North Harrow station opened on 22 March 1915. The station was rebuilt in 1930 to the designs of Charles Clark as part of the Metropolitan Railway's modernisation programme.

The station displays artwork by previous Nower Hill High School art students. It has two main exits but in recent years only one is in use, towards the town centre, presumably due to setup of the barriers not requiring both. The area under the railway bridge outside the exit to the station used to be prone to flooding at times due to its low-lying position, although this is now rarely the case due to works to create a storm overflow area at the nearby Headstone Manor's recreation area.

== Services ==
North Harrow station is on the Metropolitan line in London fare zone 5. It is between Pinner to the north and Harrow-on-the-Hill to the south. In the northbound direction, the station is served by trains to Watford (4tph), Amersham (2tph) and Chesham (2tph) trains (at peak times, 'fast' trains do not stop at stations between Harrow-on-the-Hill and Moor Park). In the southbound direction, off-peak services generally run 4tph to Baker Street and 4tph to Aldgate.

Preceding station	London Underground	Following station
Pinner towards Watford, Chesham or Amersham	Metropolitan line	Harrow-on-the-Hill towards Baker Street or Aldgate

== Connections ==
London Buses routes H9 and H10 serve the station. The routes H18, H19 and 183 all serve the nearby Pinner Road.
