= Pinner tube station =

London Underground station

Pinner
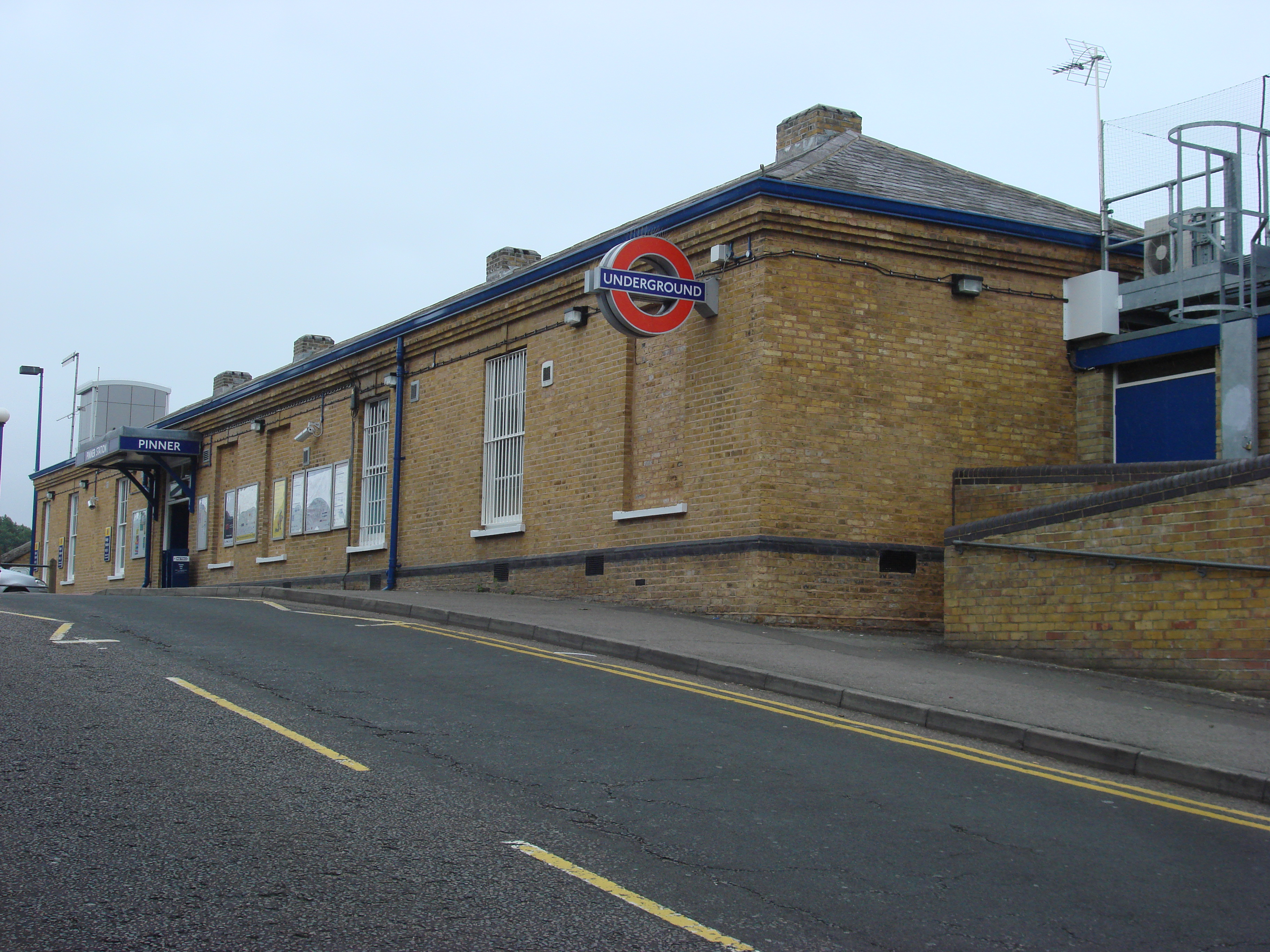
- Station building
- Interactive map of Pinner

General information
- Location: Pinner
- Local authority: London Borough of Harrow
- Managed by: London Underground
- Number of platforms: 2
- Accessible: Yes
- Fare zone: 5

London Underground annual entry and exit
- 2021: ▼1.28 million
- 2022: ▲2.11 million
- 2023: ▲2.22 million
- 2024: ▲2.42 million
- 2025: ▲2.47 million

Key dates
- 25 May 1885: Opened
- 3 April 1967: Goods yard closed

Other information
- External links: TfL station info page
- Coordinates: 51.5928°N 0.3806°W

Pinner is a London Underground station in Pinner, north-west London. It was opened in 1885 as part of the Victorian expansion of dormitory suburbs, and was one of the stations included in the Metro-land project in the early 20th century. The site is served by several bus routes, including links to the Hatch End railway station, which was known as Pinner & Hatch End prior to 1920. Step free facilities were opened in 2008. The station is on the Metropolitan line, between Northwood Hills and North Harrow stations. It is in London fare zone 5.

Pinner is served by all stations and semi-fast services: passengers should change at Moor Park for fast service northbound Metropolitan line services. This change is only needed on Mondays to Fridays during peak hours.

== History ==
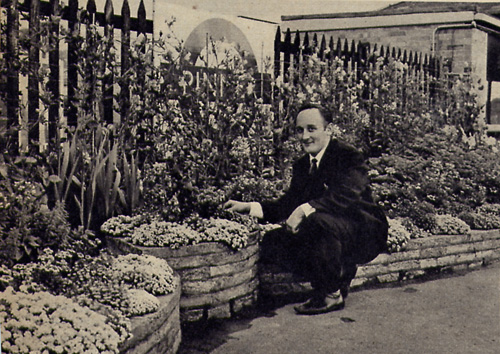
The gardens at Pinner station, London Underground Station Garden winner in 1966.

The station was opened on 25 May 1885, following a prior expansion to nearby Harrow-on-the-Hill station in 1880. It remained the terminus of the Metropolitan Railway until 1 September 1887 when the line was further extended to Rickmansworth. The long, single-story station building on the up (southbound) platform is the original building, and resembles the stations at Rickmansworth, Chorleywood and Chalfont & Latimer. The down platform buildings were built during the four-tracking project of the 1950s and 60s in a matching yellow brick.

In 1915, the Metro-land project was conceived in order to move people out of central London into rural Middlesex. Houses near the stations were built in haste and sold for as little as £400 each. However, in Pinner, houses built during this expansion were required to be worth at least £1,000, compared to Harrow-on-the-Hill, where prices were subject to a £750 minimum.

The station building on Station Approach is locally listed by the Harrow Council.

== Location ==
London bus routes 183, H11, H12 and H13 serve the station's location and provide services that terminate at Golders Green, Harrow, Mount Vernon Hospital, Northwood Hills (St Vincent's hospice), Ruislip Lido, South Harrow and Stanmore. The H12 route also connects Pinner tube station to Hatch End railway station, which was named Pinner & Hatch End between 1911 and 1920, before being renamed Hatch End (for Pinner) and then, in 1956, Hatch End. Northwood Hills station is 2.08 kilometres (1.29 mi) to the north west, and North Harrow is 1.48 kilometres (0.92 mi) to the south east on the Metropolitan line.

Access to the southbound platform is step-free from the ticket hall. In order to reach the northbound platform, during off-peak times, it is necessary to use a footbridge, which was constructed in 2002. Before this, a subway between the two platforms existed, but this was closed for safety reasons. Accessibility lifts opened on 18 July 2008, making the station totally step-free. Originally scheduled for installation in 2005, the delay had been caused by a lack of funding and was originally rescheduled for 2009/10, but following complaints by the Harrow Public Transport Users Association, construction was brought forward to 2007, only to be delayed by the collapse of London Underground contractors Metronet. During the evening peak, there is an extra exit gate on the south end of the Northbound platform, which leads out to a small car park and Pinner Library/Synagogue.

== Services ==
Pinner station is on the Metropolitan line in London fare zone 5. It is between Northwood Hills to the north and North Harrow to the south. In the northbound direction, off-peak, the station is served by trains to Watford (4tph), Amersham (2tph) and Chesham (2tph) trains (at peak times, 'fast' trains do not stop at stations between Harrow-on-the-Hill and Moor Park). In the southbound direction, off-peak services generally run 4tph to Baker Street and 4tph to Aldgate.

| Preceding station | London Underground | Following station |
|---|---|---|
| Northwood Hills towards Watford, Chesham or Amersham | Metropolitan line | North Harrow towards Baker Street or Aldgate |
