= Chorleywood station =

London Underground and railway station

Chorleywood
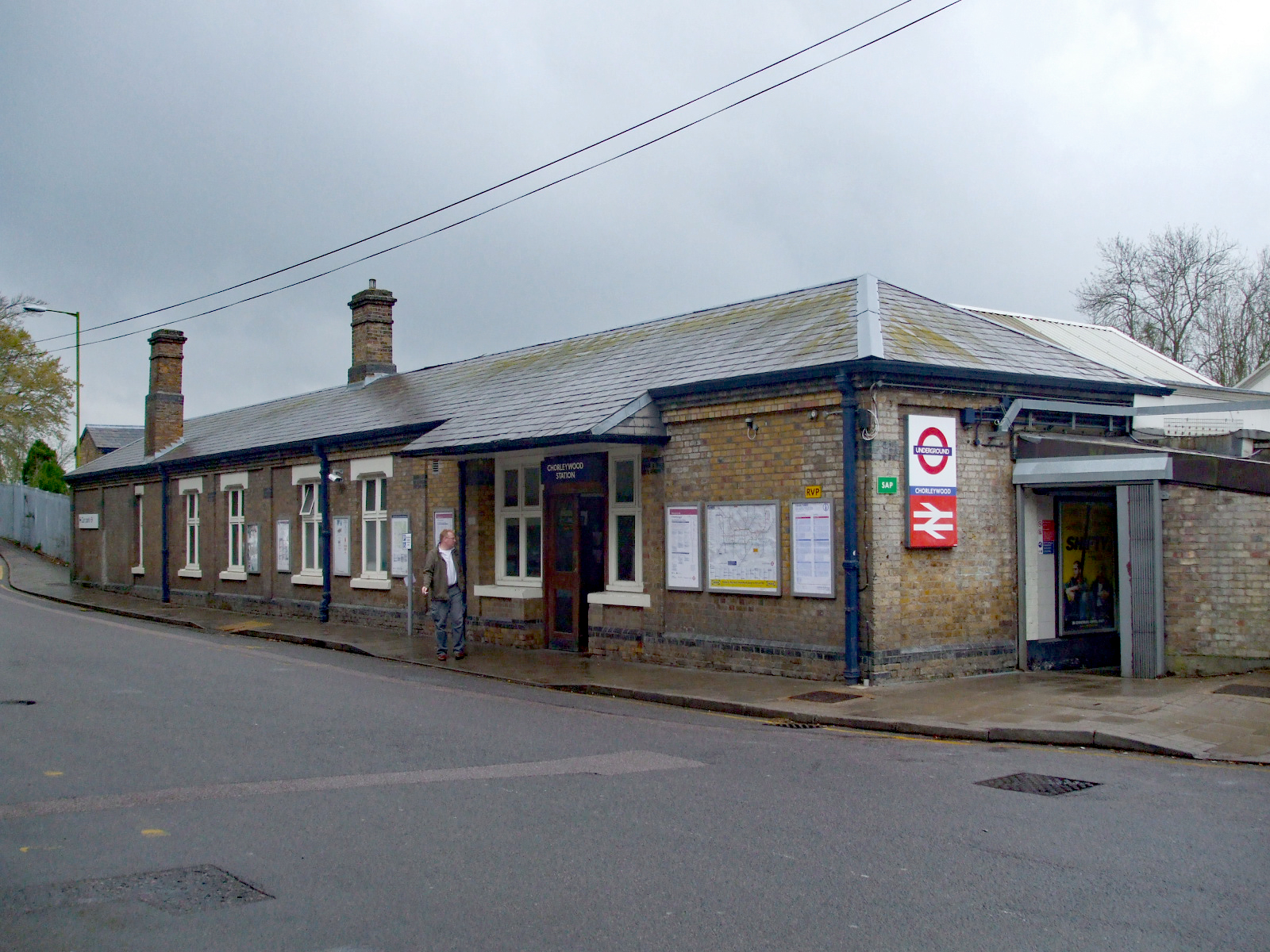
- Up side station building
- Interactive map of Chorleywood

General information
- Location: Chorleywood
- Local authority: District of Three Rivers
- Managed by: London Underground
- Station code: CLW
- Number of platforms: 2
- Accessible: Yes
- Fare zone: 7

London Underground annual entry and exit
- 2020: ▼0.77 million
- 2021: ▲0.80 million
- 2022: ▲1.34 million
- 2023: ▲1.46 million
- 2024: ▼1.40 million

National Rail annual entry and exit
- 2020–21: ▼0.128 million
- 2021–22: ▲0.336 million
- 2022–23: ▲0.455 million
- 2023–24: ▲0.518 million
- 2024–25: ▼0.494 million

Key dates
- 1889: Opened
- 14 November 1966: Goods yard closed

Other information
- External links: TfL station info page; Departures; Facilities
- Coordinates: 51.6542°N 0.5183°W

Chorleywood is a London Underground and National Rail station in London fare zone 7 (previously zone B) on the Metropolitan line. The village of Chorleywood is in the Three Rivers district of Hertfordshire about 20 miles (32 km) from London. Chorleywood station is also served by Chiltern Railways, which runs trains from London Marylebone station through to Aylesbury.

== History ==
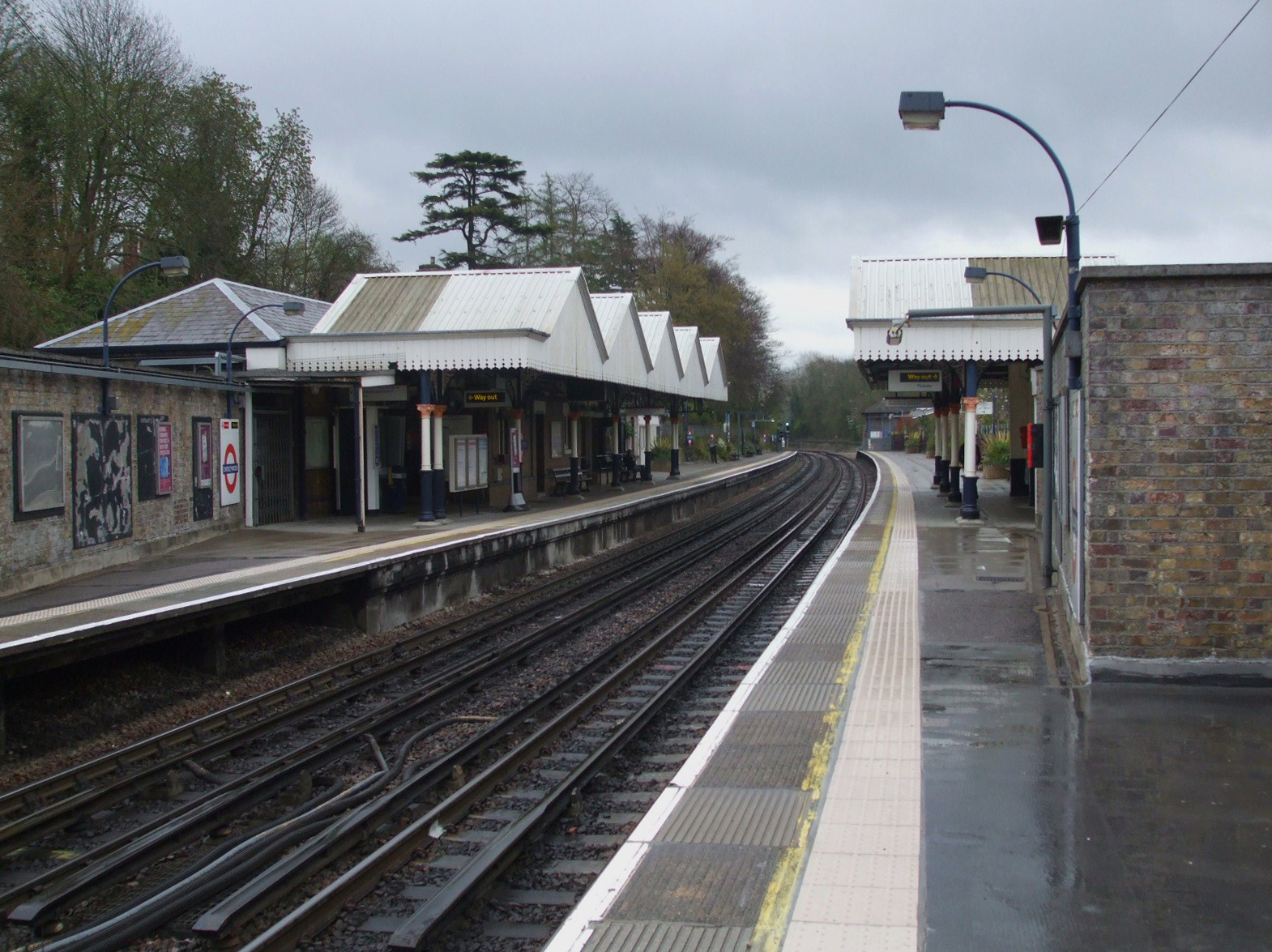
Platform view facing south

The station was built by expanding the local train station and was opened as "Chorley Wood" in July 1889. The name was changed to "Chorley Wood & Chenies" in November 1915 until 1934 when it reverted to the original name until 1965. The present name has existed since then. Chorleywood station was formerly served by steam-hauled Metropolitan line trains from Aylesbury to London, with a changeover to an electric locomotive at Rickmansworth. Steam trains were withdrawn in 1961 when electrification north of Rickmansworth to Amersham and Chesham was completed. From the early 1960s to 2012, Metropolitan line trains at Chorleywood were formed of London Underground A60 Stock (and the almost identical A62 Stock), but were replaced by London Underground S8 stock. Chiltern Railways (Aylesbury-Marylebone) trains are formed by Class 165 diesel multiple units.

Between October 2004 and December 2011 almost all southbound Metropolitan line trains from Chorleywood into London were fast trains to Baker Street, calling at Rickmansworth, Moor Park, Harrow-on-the-Hill, Wembley Park, Finchley Road and Baker Street. Since December 2011 only a few morning peak hour Metropolitan line trains have been operated as fast trains, at other times the trains mostly call at all stations, adding over 10 minutes to journey times. The journey to central London takes around 35–50 minutes depending on the line and time of day. Northbound Metropolitan line trains call at all stations to Amersham or Chesham.

== Station layout ==
The station has two platforms shared between the London Underground Metropolitan line and National Rail. Both platforms are accessible from street level. On Platform 2, there is one of the few surviving K8 telephone kiosks. Now used for the TfL internal system, the kiosk is Grade II listed

== Services ==
=== Metropolitan line ===
The Metropolitan line is the only line on the London Underground to operate an express service. This is southbound in the morning peaks and northbound in the evening peaks. Southbound fast trains run non-stop between Moor Park, Harrow-on-the-Hill and Finchley Road. Southbound semi-fast trains only run non-stop between Harrow-on-the-Hill and Finchley Road. Northbound fast and semi-fast trains call additionally at Wembley Park before running non-stop between the aforementioned stations.

The off-peak service in trains per hour (tph) presently consists of:

- 4tph to Aldgate (all stations)
- 2tph to Amersham
- 2tph to Chesham

The morning peak service in trains per hour (tph) presently consists of:

- 4tph to Aldgate (fast)
- 2tph to Aldgate (semi-fast)
- 4tph to Amersham
- 2tph to Chesham

The evening peak service in trains per hour (tph) presently consists of:

- 2tph to Baker Street (all stations)
- 4tph to Aldgate via Baker Street (all stations)
- 4tph to Amersham
- 2tph to Chesham

=== Chiltern Railways ===
Chiltern Railways operate services between Aylesbury Vale Parkway via Amersham and Aylesbury and London Marylebone via Harrow on the Hill. All Chiltern Railway services run non stop between Rickmansworth and Harrow on the Hill and Harrow on the Hill and London Marylebone.

The off-peak service in trains per hour (tph) presently consists of:

- 2tph to London Marylebone
- 1tph to Aylesbury
- 1tph to Aylesbury Vale Parkway via Aylesbury

Preceding station	London Underground	Following station
Chalfont & Latimer towards Amersham or Chesham	Metropolitan line	Rickmansworth towards Baker Street or Aldgate
Preceding station	National Rail	Following station
Chalfont & Latimer	Chiltern Railways; London to Aylesbury Line	Rickmansworth
