= Croxley tube station =

London Underground station

Croxley
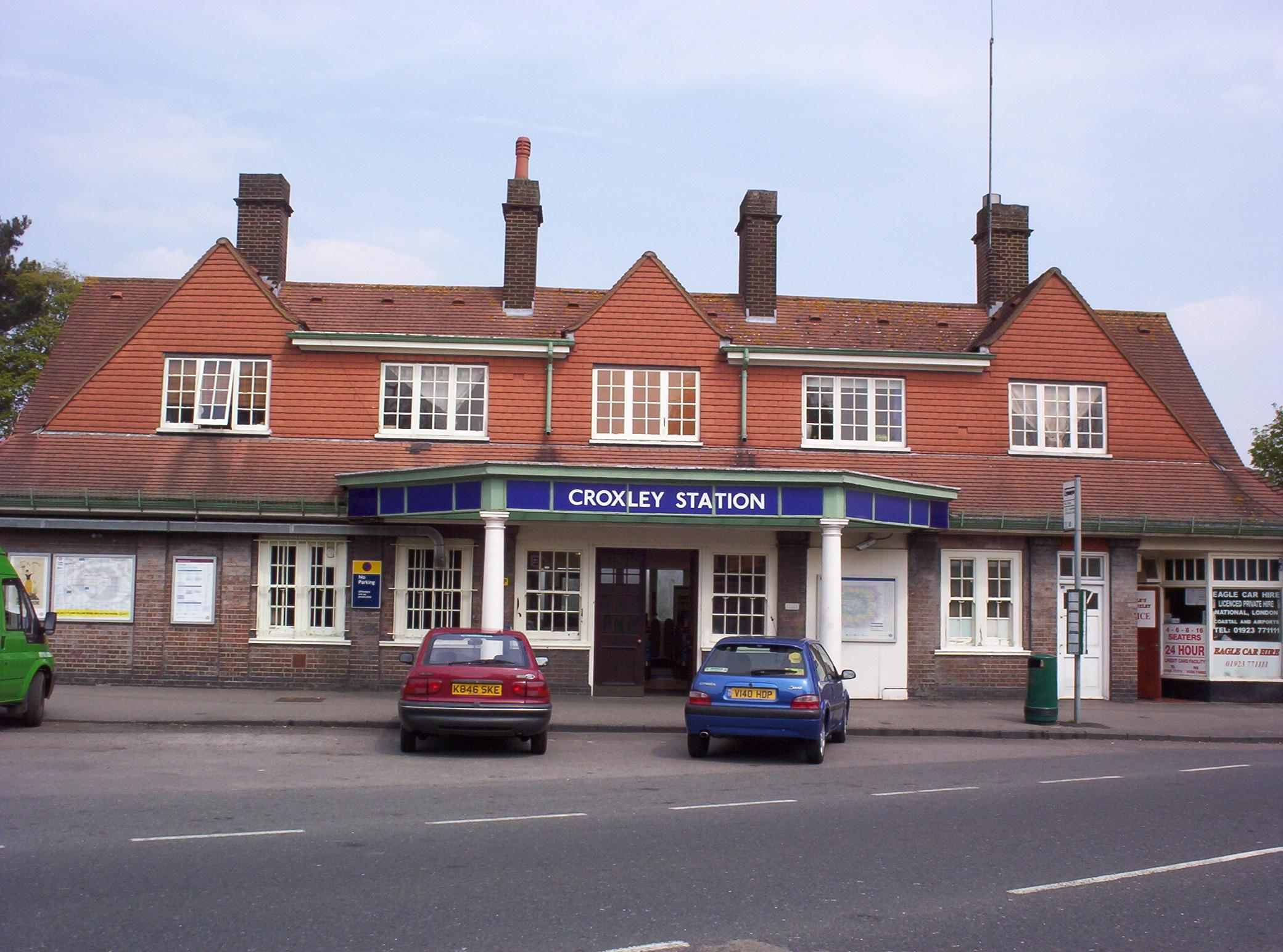
- Station entrance
- Interactive map of Croxley

General information
- Location: Croxley Green
- Local authority: Three Rivers
- Managed by: London Underground
- Number of platforms: 2
- Fare zone: 7

London Underground annual entry and exit
- 2020: ▼0.52 million
- 2021: ▼0.49 million
- 2022: ▲0.81 million
- 2023: ▲0.84 million
- 2024: ▲0.90 million

Railway companies
- Original company: Metropolitan and Great Central Joint Railway
- Post-grouping: Metropolitan and Great Central Joint Railway

Key dates
- 2 November 1925: Opened as Croxley Green
- 23 May 1949: Renamed Croxley
- 14 November 1966: Goods yard closed

Other information
- External links: TfL station info page
- Coordinates: 51.6475°N 0.4413°W

Croxley is a London Underground station. It is located on Watford Road (A412) in Croxley Green, Rickmansworth, Hertfordshire. The station is on the Watford branch of the Metropolitan line, between Watford and Moor Park stations. It is the only intermediate station on the branch, and is in London fare zone 7.

== History ==
Croxley station opened on 2 November 1925 as "Croxley Green" on the Metropolitan Railway's extension to Watford with lines connecting both Rickmansworth and Moor Park. However, this led to confusion as there was another Croxley Green opened by the LNWR in 1912, so it was renamed to "Croxley" in 1949. There had been shuttles running to and from Rickmansworth stations regularly but was withdrawn in January 1960, later reinstated in 1987 but only one in early morning and late evenings each way. The shuttles to Rickmansworth were later extended to Amersham following the introduction of the longer S8 Stock trains.

== Aborted Metropolitan Line extension ==
The Croxley Rail Link was a railway engineering project which would have resulted in the Watford branch services on the London Underground's Metropolitan line being diverted at Baldwins Lane from the current terminus at Watford tube station onto the alignment of the disused Watford and Rickmansworth Railway between Croxley Green railway station and Watford High Street stations before continuing to Watford Junction. The diversion would have required the construction of a viaduct over the Grand Union Canal, River Gade and the A412.

On 25 January 2017, the Watford Observer newspaper published an update on the Croxley Rail Link confirming work had stopped as there was an ongoing funding issue.

== Services ==
Croxley station is on the Watford branch of the Metropolitan line in London fare zone 7. It is between Watford to the north and Moor Park to the south.

Preceding station	London Underground	Following station
Watford Terminus	Metropolitan line Watford branch	Moor Park towards Baker Street or Aldgate
Watford Terminus	Metropolitan line Watford branch (North Curve); Limited service	Rickmansworth towards Rickmansworth or Chesham
Abandoned Croxley Rail Link
Moor Park towards Baker Street or Aldgate	Metropolitan line	Cassiobridge towards Watford Junction
