= Rickmansworth station =

London Underground and Chiltern Railways station

Rickmansworth
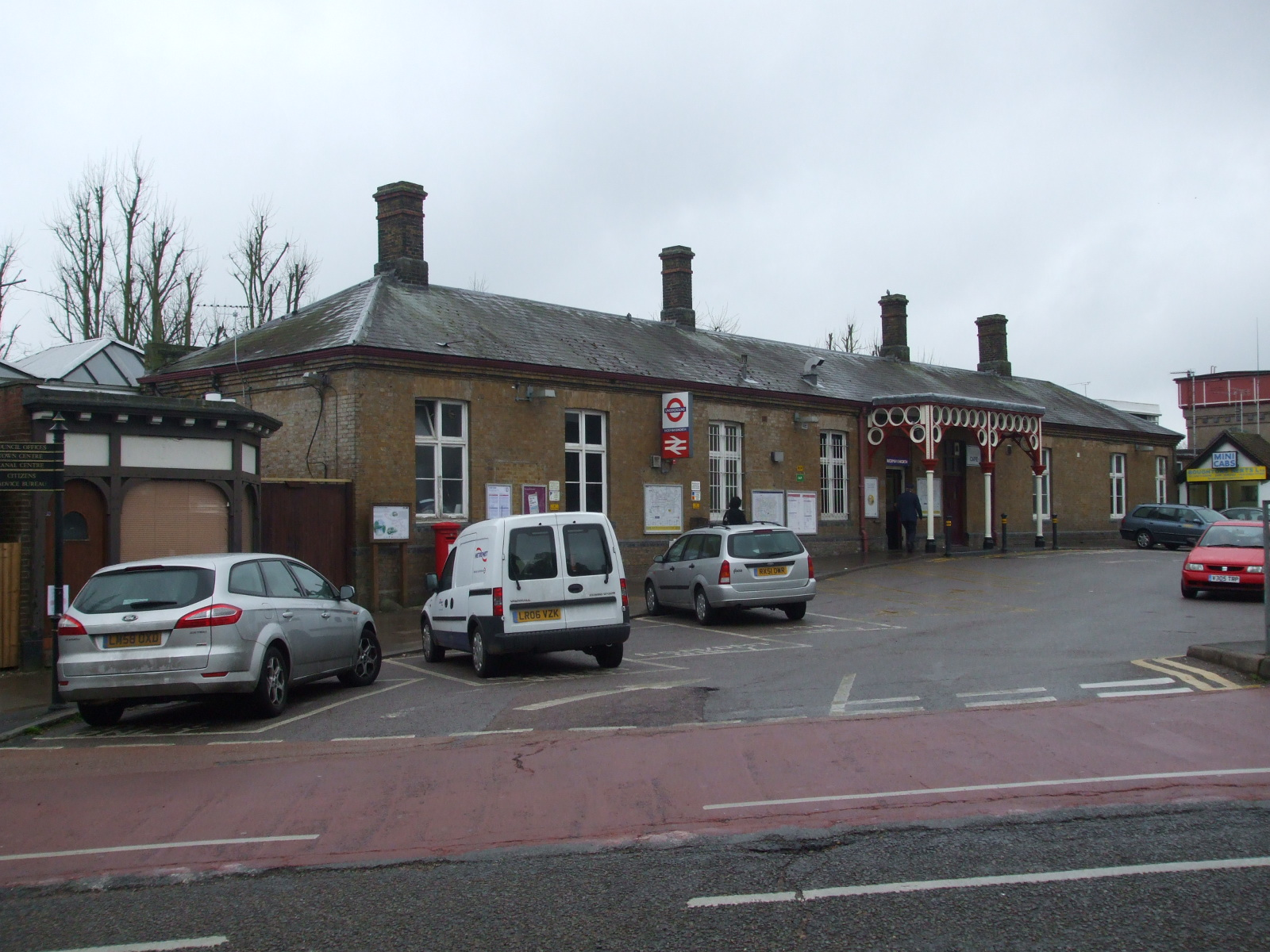
- Station building
- Interactive map of Rickmansworth

General information
- Location: Rickmansworth
- Local authority: District of Three Rivers
- Managed by: London Underground
- Station code: RIC
- Number of platforms: 2
- Accessible: Yes (Southbound only)
- Fare zone: 7

London Underground annual entry and exit
- 2021: ▼1.10 million
- 2022: ▲1.77 million
- 2023: ▲1.85 million
- 2024: ▼1.80 million
- 2025: ▲1.86 million

National Rail annual entry and exit
- 2020–21: ▼0.338 million
- 2021–22: ▲0.763 million
- 2022–23: ▲0.983 million
- 2023–24: ▲1.073 million
- 2024–25: ▼0.998 million

Key dates
- 1887: Opened
- 14 November 1966: Goods yard closed

Other information
- External links: TfL station info page; Departures; Facilities
- Coordinates: 51.64027°N 0.47333°W

Rickmansworth (/ˈrɪkmənzwərθ/) is an interchange railway station in the town of Rickmansworth, Hertfordshire, northwest of Central London. It is served by the Metropolitan line of the London Underground and by Chiltern Railways of the National Rail. It is one of the few London Underground stations beyond Greater London and as a consequence is in London fare zone 7.

== History ==
The line to Rickmansworth was authorised in 1880 and the station opened on 1 September 1887 as the terminus of the Metropolitan Railway's extension from Pinner. In 1889, the line was extended from Rickmansworth to Chesham. Rickmansworth was shared with the Great Central Railway which reached Quainton Road in 1898. The extension of Metropolitan Line electrification brought electric services out to Rickmansworth on 5 January 1925, allowing the locomotive change point to be moved (north of Rickmansworth steam traction was provided by the LNER).

In 1925 another platform was constructed at the south end of the station for the Watford branch shuttle. There was a proposal in the New Works Programme to extend electrification to Aylesbury, but this was postponed at the outbreak of the Second World War. Afterwards, electrification reached Amersham with British Rail trains completing the journey to Aylesbury. The Rickmansworth-Watford shuttle ceased and the final steam train ran on 10 September 1961.

Electric locomotive-hauled trains on the Metropolitan were replaced with A60 and A62 Stock. In 1987 the shuttle to Watford resumed, but only one each way, early morning and late evening. This was later extended to Amersham when the new S8 Stock was introduced.

There is a signal cabin at the station, responsible for controlling signals in the Rickmansworth and Watford areas. Many evening Metropolitan trains terminate at Rickmansworth due to the number of sidings near the station.

In 2018, it was announced that the station would gain step free access by 2022, as part of a £200m investment to increase the number of accessible stations on London Underground.

== Services ==
On the London Underground, Rickmansworth is served by trains on the Metropolitan line to Amersham and to Chesham from Baker Street and at peak times from Aldgate.

On the National Rail, Rickmansworth is served by Chiltern Railways between Marylebone and Aylesbury via Harrow-on-the-Hill. During peak-times, some Chiltern Line trains do not stop at Rickmansworth.

There are two tracks through the station, shared in both directions by London Underground and National Rail trains. A short third bay platform (now severed) is no longer used, but used to be the terminus for shuttles to Watford. There are occasional services between Rickmansworth and Watford which use the 'North Curve' of track: in the 2021 timetable there are two early in the morning plus one late in the evening.

Preceding station	London Underground	Following station
Chorleywood towards Amersham or Chesham	Metropolitan line	Moor Park towards Baker Street or Aldgate
Terminus	Metropolitan line Limited service	Croxley towards Watford
Preceding station	National Rail	Following station
Chorleywood	Chiltern Railways; London to Aylesbury Line	Harrow-on-the-Hill

== Bibliography ==
- Green, Oliver (1987). The London Underground: An illustrated history. Ian Allan. ISBN 0-7110-1720-4.
