= Watford Central tube station =

Unbuilt London Underground station

Watford Central
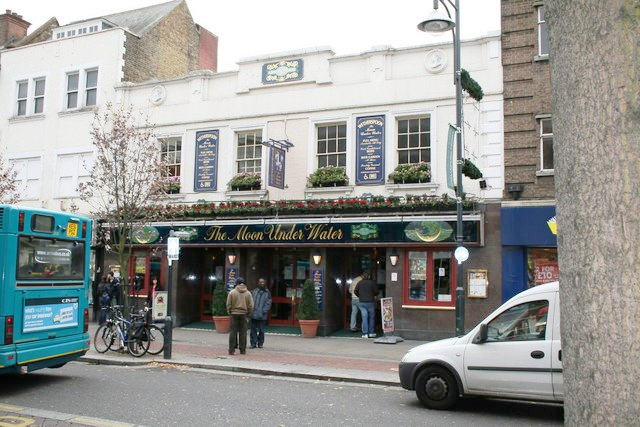
- 44 High Street; The site of Watford Central
- Interactive map of Watford Central

General information
- Location: Watford, Hertfordshire
- Local authority: Watford
- Owner: Never Opened

Railway companies
- Original company: Metropolitan Railway

Key dates
- 1927: Building purchased by the MR

Other information
- Coordinates: 51.656444°N 0.39789°W

Watford Central was a planned London Underground station for the centre of Watford, Hertfordshire. The station was planned to be the terminus of a proposed extension of the Metropolitan line from the present-day Watford tube station to the High Street opposite Clarendon Road. The proposed station booking hall has long gone, however, the facade was retained and a new building constructed behind it. It is now The Moon Under Water public house.

== History ==
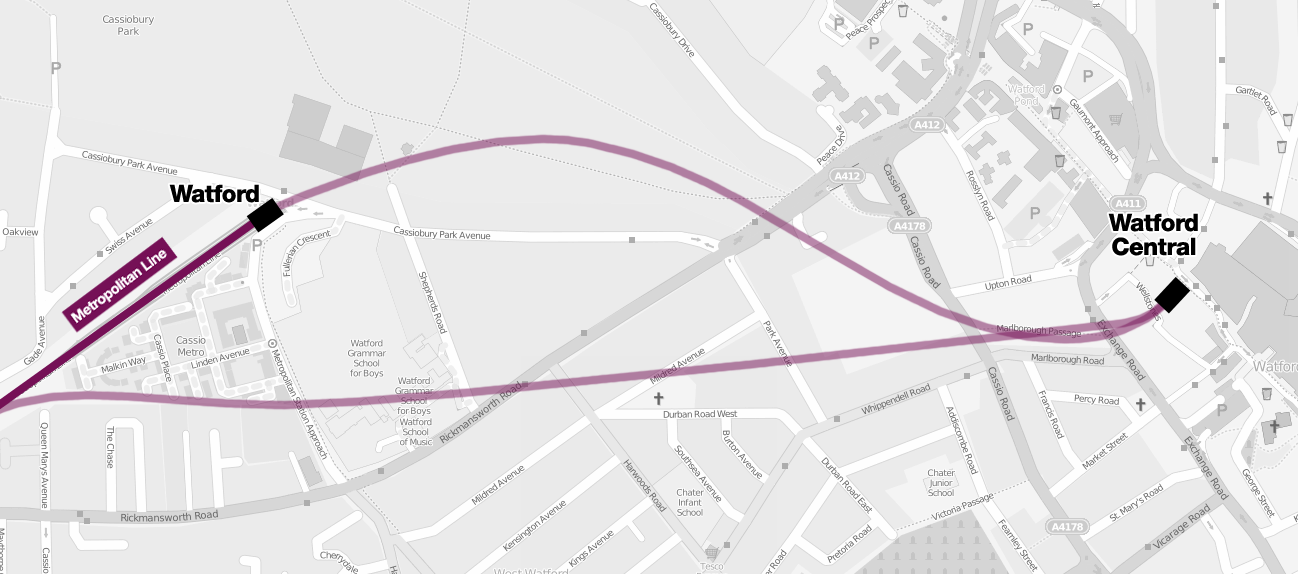
Approximate routes proposed in 1927 for the Met line extension to Watford Central

Building a line to Watford had been an ambition of the Metropolitan Railway Company for several years. Watford was already served by the LNWR main line, but Watford Urban District Council began to lobby the MR to extend their line into the town. By 1911 Watford had grown enough to make a new railway connection seem commercially viable. At this time, the MR shared tracks with the Great Central Railway (GCR) and these companies had formed the Metropolitan and Great Central Joint Railway; together they drew up plans to construct a branch line to Watford town centre, receiving Parliamentary approval in 1912. In the original plans, the Metropolitan line was to terminate at a passenger station located on Hempstead Road, close to the northern end of the High Street, with a goods station a mile further south at Cassiobury Park Avenue. The Urban District Council had recently purchased parts of the Cassiobury Estate from the Earl of Essex to create Cassiobury Park and were opposed to the MR driving a railway across their beautiful municipal park and objected to this scheme.

The outbreak of World War I in 1914 hampered the project's development, and it was not until 1922 that construction of the Watford branch commenced. By this stage, the GCR was financially less secure and the MR instead formed a joint committee with the London and North Eastern Railway (LNER), the Watford Joint Committee. Opposition from local politicians to the Cassiobury route meant that the terminus had to be sited next to the new goods yard in the Cassiobury area of the town, some distance from the centre. Watford station opened as the terminus of the Metropolitan Railway Watford branch in 1925.

The MR was keen to promote its new destination as part of its Metro-Land advertising campaign; posters published by the MR in 1925 promoting the new route "by Metro to Watford" depicted an illustrated view of Watford High Street on market day, belying the remote location of the station. While the MR was able to provide a shuttle bus service from its station to the town centre, the Metropolitan branch line passenger numbers compared unfavourably with rival services into central London offered by the LMS and the UERL Bakerloo line from the more centrally located Watford Junction and Watford High Street stations. The LNER pulled out of the venture after the General Strike of 1926.

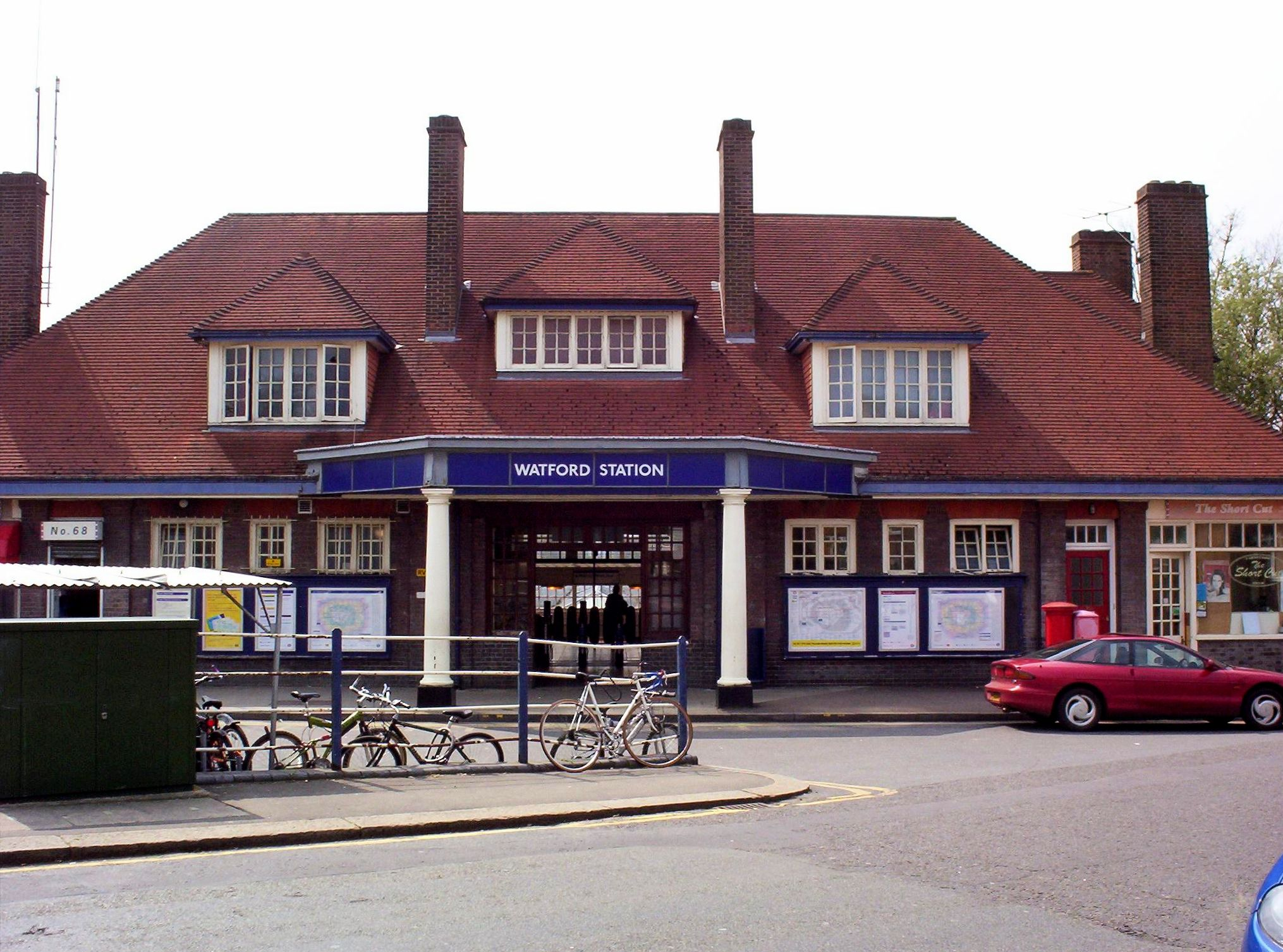
Watford Met station

The remote location of Watford Met station was clearly proving to be unsatisfactory, and the MR drew up plans to extend the line into the town centre. In 1927 the company purchased a property at 44 Watford High Street, the Empress Tea Rooms and Winter Gardens. A strip of land behind the property provided about 2.5 acres, enough for redevelopment as a railway station with a High Street frontage. Parliamentary approval given in 1929.

The MR put forward alternative routes for the line extension:

- Route 1, extending the line directly beyond the existing terminus and entering a tunnel under Cassiobury Park, Cassio Road, West Hertfordshire Sports Ground to the new station.
- Route 2, branching off from the existing railway line just south-west of the original Met station and entering a straight tunnel under the Watford Grammar School for Boys playing fields, Cassio Road, and the West Hertfordshire Sports Ground to the High Street terminus.

Neither scheme was enacted and neither tunnel was built. The terminus was to remain at its Cassiobury location.

== The building ==
The property purchased by the Metropolitan Railway at 44 High Street is located on the western side of the street close to the junction with Clarendon Road. The original building was named Derby House, and after extensive refurbishment in 1916 which included refacing of the frontage and the addition of two medallions of Queen Victoria, the rear garden was opened as The Empress Winter Gardens and Tea Lounge.

The premises still stand today and have local listed building status, although the elaborate Winter Garden buildings which once stood behind the property have been demolished. For a brief period in 1921, the Winter Gardens served as a makeshift cinema, serving teas to patrons in the intervals. After acquisition by the Metropolitan Railway in 1927, 44 High Street was let out to a succession of tenants and eventually passed to the Lewis Omnibus Company, which was itself taken over by the London Passenger Transport Board in 1933. In the following years, the building was used as a furniture shop and later it became a branch of the clothing retailer, Next. Today the building is occupied by Wetherspoons as The Moon Under Water public house.

== Metropolitan line extension ==
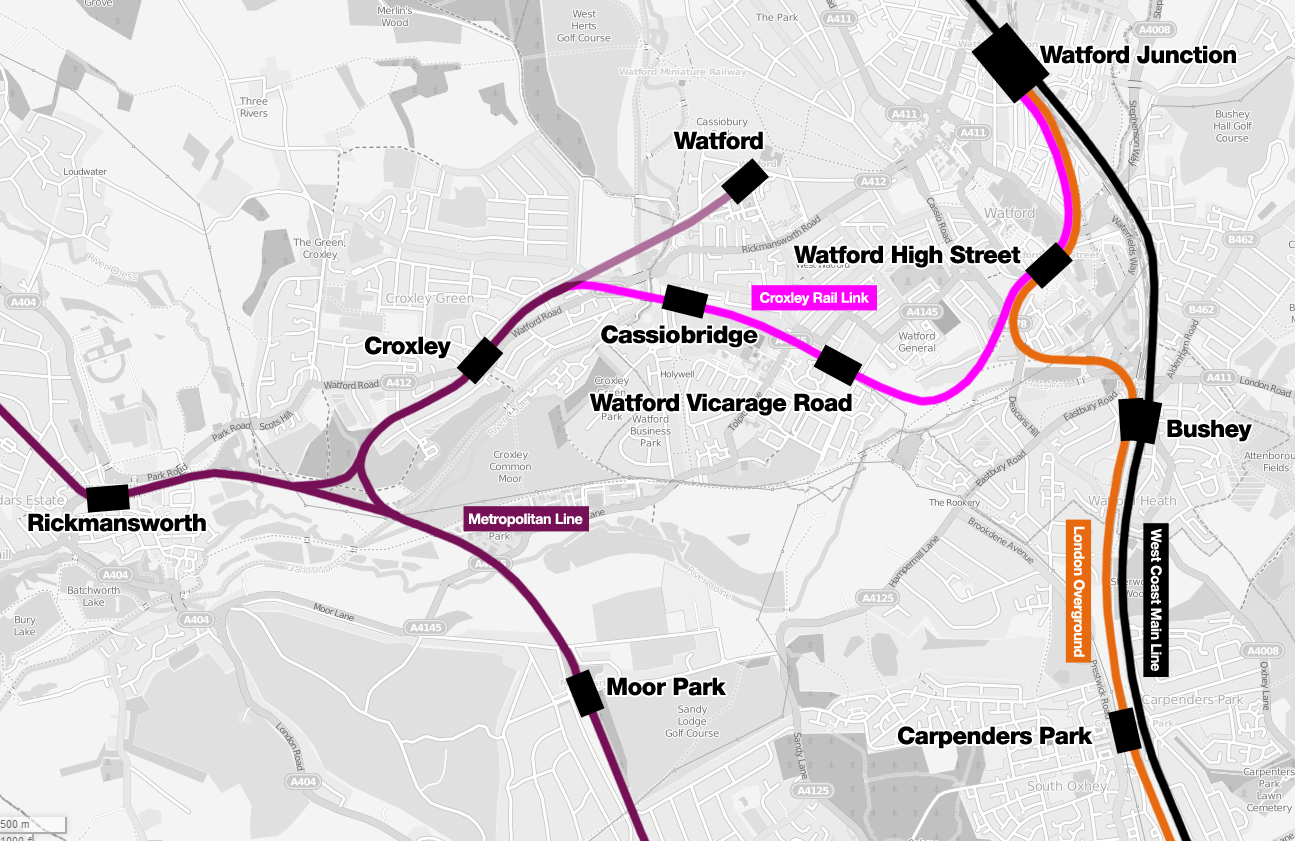
Croxley Rail Link

In 2011, more than 80 years after the MR first attempted to extend its line into central Watford, a new scheme was approved to continue the Metropolitan line across the town to Watford Junction station. This Metropolitan line extension is also known as the Croxley Rail Link. A disused stretch of former British Rail track which ran to Croxley Green station would be reinstated, connecting the Metropolitan line with the Watford DC Line at Watford High Street (London Overground) and sharing track to the terminus at Watford Junction. The project was to be funded jointly by Hertfordshire County Council and Transport for London. Had this project gone ahead, Watford tube station would be closed to passengers.

On 25 January 2017, the Watford Observer newspaper published an update on the Croxley Rail Link confirming work had stopped as there was an ongoing funding issue.

Preceding station	London Underground	Following station
Terminus	Metropolitan line Watford extension (Never completed)	Watford towards Baker Street or Aldgate

== See also ==
- Watford and Edgware Railway
- Watford DC Line
