= List of stations in London fare zones 7–14 =

Fare zones 7–9 are ancillary zones of the Travelcard and Oyster card fares scheme managed by Transport for London, used for calculating fares from some stations outside Greater London that are not in zones 4, 5 and 6. Travelcards are available on Oyster with validity in these zones. Stations in these zones are typically more than 16 miles (26 km) from Piccadilly Circus. Additionally, Fare zones A–W (or 10–14) are further unpublicised zones for stations where Oyster card is accepted and fares are set by National Rail, but the full range of zonal ticketing is not available. Compared to the full concentric rings of zones 1–6, these zones form patches that extend into Buckinghamshire, Essex, Hertfordshire, Kent, Surrey and West Sussex.

== Background ==
Fare zones 1, 2, 3a, 3b and 3c—covering all London Underground stations in Greater London—were established on 22 May 1983. Seven stations on the Central line and eight on the Metropolitan line that were outside the boundary were not included in the zones. (Note: The Central line stations were Buckhurst Hill, Debden, Epping, Loughton, North Weald, Ongar and Theydon Bois. The Metropolitan line stations were Amersham, Chalfont and Latimer, Chesham, Chorleywood, Croxley, Moor Park and Watford. The Bakerloo line north of Queen's Park was excluded from zonal fares.) The zones were reorganised as 1, 2, 3, 4, 5 and 6 by January 1991. As a precursor to introducing ancillary zones, stations not included in fare zones 1–6 were organised in three groups labelled A, B and C by 1995. Lettered zones A, B, C and D appeared on publicity material by 1999. These were replaced by zones 7, 8 and 9 on 2 January 2008 and expanded to further stations.

== Zones 7–9 ==
Fare zones 7–9 extend from the boundary of Greater London. They include stations outside London that are not in zones 4, 5 and 6 where fares are set by Transport for London. (Note: The following stations outside Greater London are in zones 4–6: Chigwell (4); Grange Hill (4); Roding Valley (4); Buckhurst Hill (5); Stoneleigh (5); Banstead (6); Caterham (6); Chipstead (6); Debden (6); Elstree & Borehamwood (6); Epping (6); Epsom Downs (6); Ewell East (6); Ewell West (6); Hampton Court (6); Kingswood (6); Loughton (6); Moor Park (6 & 7); Tadworth (6); Tattenham Corner (6); Thames Ditton (6); Theydon Bois (6); Upper Warlingham (6); Whyteleafe (6); Whyteleafe South (6)) They form small patches rather than full concentric rings around London of zones 1–6. Travelcard season tickets for these zones are only sold in limited combinations. Tickets to these stations issued by National Rail are subject to certain restrictions.

=== Zone 7 ===
Zone	Station	Local authority	Managed by	Notes
7	Carpenders Park	Three Rivers	London Overground	
7	Chorleywood	Three Rivers	London Underground	
7	Croxley	Three Rivers	London Underground	
7	Moor Park	Three Rivers	London Underground	Also in zone 6
7	Rickmansworth	Three Rivers	London Underground	
7	Theobalds Grove	Broxbourne	London Overground	
7	Waltham Cross	Broxbourne	Greater Anglia	
7	Watford	Watford	London Underground	

=== Zone 8 ===
Zone	Station	Local authority	Managed by	Notes
8	Bushey	Watford	London Overground	
8	Chalfont & Latimer	Buckinghamshire	London Underground	
8	Cheshunt	Broxbourne	Greater Anglia	
8	Dartford	Dartford	Southeastern	
8	Swanley	Sevenoaks	Southeastern	
8	Watford High Street	Watford	London Overground	

=== Zone 9 ===
Zone	Station	Local authority	Managed by	Notes
9	Amersham	Buckinghamshire	London Underground	
9	Brentwood	Brentwood	Elizabeth line	
9	Chesham	Buckinghamshire	London Underground	

== Unpublicised zones ==
The Oyster card technology accommodates further zones that have their fares set by National Rail companies. To avoid confusion, the zones are not publicised. This is because the full range of ticketing is not available as in the concentric ring zones 1–6 and fares are not consistent between stations in the same zone. Like zones 7–9, these zones apply to small patches of stations. On London rail maps, these stations appear with the caption "Outside fare zones". They are included in the system for pay-as-go and capping, but special fares apply, and Travelcard season tickets on Oyster card are only available where indicated. Stations in these zones are:

Zone	Oyster	Station	Local authority	Managed by	Notes
A	10	Watford Junction	Watford	London Northwestern Railway	Zone W for pay-as-you-go; Oyster Travelcard
—N/a	10	Cuffley	Welwyn Hatfield	Great Northern	
—N/a	10	Epsom	Epsom and Ewell	Southern	
G	10	Chafford Hundred	Thurrock	c2c	Zone A for capping
G	10	Grays	Thurrock	c2c	Zone A for capping
G	10	Ockendon	Thurrock	c2c	Zone A for capping
G	10	Purfleet	Thurrock	c2c	Zone A for capping
B	11	Bayford	East Hertfordshire	Great Northern	
B	11	Broxbourne	Broxbourne	Greater Anglia	Oyster Travelcard
B	11	Hertford East	East Hertfordshire	Greater Anglia	Oyster Travelcard
B	11	Hertford North	East Hertfordshire	Great Northern	
B	11	Potters Bar	Hertsmere	Great Northern	
B	11	Radlett	Hertsmere	Thameslink	
B	11	Rye House	Broxbourne	Greater Anglia	Oyster Travelcard
B	11	St Margarets	East Hertfordshire	Greater Anglia	Oyster Travelcard
B	11	Ware	East Hertfordshire	Greater Anglia	Oyster Travelcard
C	12	Shenfield	Brentwood	Greater Anglia	Oyster Travelcard
D	13	Earlswood	Reigate and Banstead	Southern	
D	13	Horley	Reigate and Banstead	Southern	
D	13	Merstham	Reigate and Banstead	Southern	
D	13	Redhill	Reigate and Banstead	Southern	
D	13	Salfords	Reigate and Banstead	Southern	
E	14	Gatwick Airport	Crawley	Gatwick Express	

Zone F (or 15) was reserved for Elizabeth line stations out to Reading but is unused.

== Changes ==
- January 1997: Debden and Theydon Bois moved from zone A to zone 6, Epping moved from zone B to zone 6 and Moor Park moved from zone A to zones 6 and A
- January 1998: Amersham and Chesham moved from zone C to zone D
- January 2004: Watford moved from zone B to zone A
- November 2007: Carpenders Park, Bushey, Watford High Street and Watford Junction added.
- January 2008: Zones A (Croxley, Rickmansworth and Watford) and B (Chorleywood) merged and renamed zone 7, zone C (Chalfont & Latimer) renamed zone 8, zone D (Amersham and Chesham) renamed zone 9, Carpenders Park moved from outside the zones to zone 7, Bushey and Watford High Street moved from outside zones to zone 8
- January 2010: Chafford Hundred, Grays, Purfleet and Ockendon added
- October 2011: Theobalds Grove and Waltham Cross added to zone 7, Cheshunt added to zone 8, Brentwood, Broxbourne and Shenfield added
- May 2015: Brentwood moved to zone 9
- September 2015: Dartford added to zone 8
- October 2015: Rye House, St Margarets (Hertfordshire), Ware and Hertford East added
- January 2016: Merstham, Redhill, Earlswood, Salfords, Horley and Gatwick Airport added
- March 2016: Swanley added to zone 8
- February 2019: Epsom added to zone 9 (unpublicised)
- April 2019: Cuffley added to zone 9 (unpublicised), Bayford and Hertford North added
- August 2019: Potters Bar and Radlett added
- December 2025: Cuffley and Epsom moved from zone 9 to zone 10 (unpublicised)

== See also ==
- CPAY area, for stations where contactless is accepted beyond zone 14
