= Moor Park tube station =

London Underground station

Moor Park
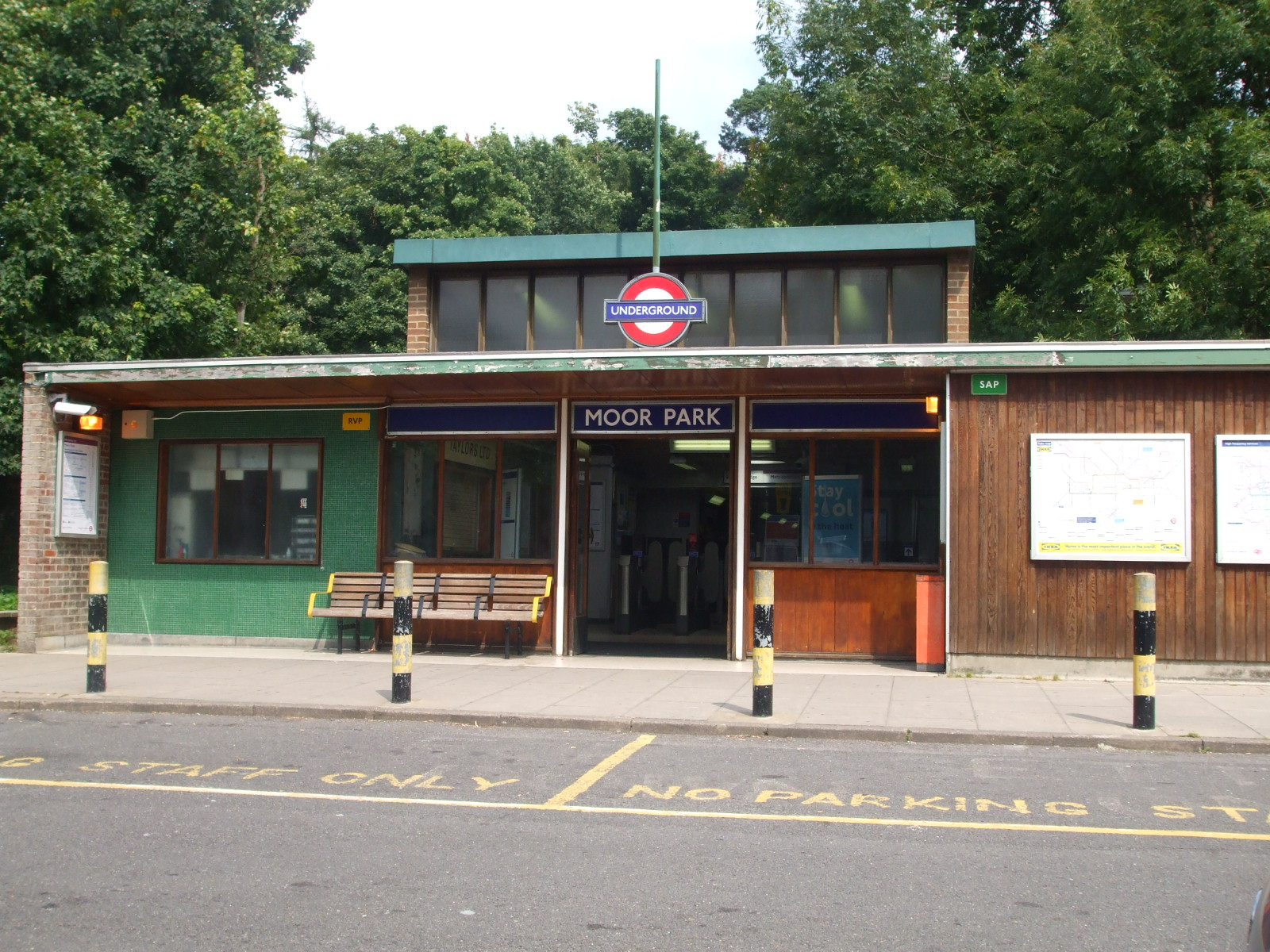
- Main entrance, on the northbound side
- Interactive map of Moor Park

General information
- Location: Moor Park
- Local authority: District of Three Rivers
- Managed by: London Underground
- Number of platforms: 4
- Fare zone: 6 and 7

London Underground annual entry and exit
- 2020: ▼0.59 million
- 2021: ▼0.46 million
- 2022: ▲0.73 million
- 2023: ▲0.81 million
- 2024: ▲0.83 million

Key dates
- 1 September 1887: Metropolitan Railway's extension opened from Pinner, en route to Rickmansworth, passing through here
- 9 May 1910: Opened as "Sandy Lodge"
- 18 October 1923: Renamed "Moor Park and Sandy Lodge"
- 2 November 1925: Goods yard closed
- 25 September 1950: Renamed "Moor Park"
- 1961: Station rebuilt, given quadruple track

Other information
- External links: TfL station info page
- Coordinates: 51.63°N 0.431°W

Moor Park is a London Underground station. It is located in the Three Rivers district of Hertfordshire, serving those living on the Moor Park estate, and also on the neighbouring Eastbury and South Oxhey estates. The station is outside the Greater London boundary but is in both London fare zone 6 and 7. It is on the Metropolitan line, between Rickmansworth (on the main branch towards Amersham or Chesham) or Croxley (on the Watford branch) and Northwood stations.

== History ==
The route extension from Pinner to Rickmansworth opened in 1887 by the Metropolitan Railway. Shortly after in 1899, Great Central Railway trains also passed here, following the Metropolitan via Verney Junction. Moor Park didn't open until 9 May 1910, and the station was called Sandy Lodge, after the Sandy Lodge Golf Course. It was renamed to Moor Park & Sandy Lodge in 1923 to reflect the area it was in. The lines were electrified in 1925 when the Watford branch was opened and electric-hauled trains passed to Rickmansworth to exchange the traction for steam. In 1950 the station was renamed to Moor Park and it was completely rebuilt in 1961, increasing the number of platforms to four: two for northbound trains (one for slow/semi-fast and one for fast services) and two for southbound trains to the city. British Rail and Network SouthEast trains stopped calling at Moor Park from 1993.

== Services ==
Since the 2011 timetable, fast and semi-fast trains have only run during peak times. The fast trains to Aldgate call from platform 2 during the morning peak, and to Amersham or Chesham from platform 1 during the evening peak. At all other times, and all day at weekends, trains depart from platforms 3 and 4, providing all station or semi-fast services to Baker Street or Aldgate going southbound, and to Watford, Amersham or Chesham northbound.

Preceding station	London Underground	Following station
Croxley towards Watford	Metropolitan line	Northwood Semi-fast (peak hours only)/All Stations service towards Baker Street or Aldgate
Rickmansworth towards Amersham or Chesham	Metropolitan line	Harrow-on-the-Hill Fast service (morning peak hours only) towards Baker Street or Aldgate
Historical railways
Rickmansworth towards Aylesbury	Chiltern Lines; London to Aylesbury Line	Harrow-on-the-Hill towards Marylebone
