= Harrow-on-the-Hill station =

London Underground and railway station

Harrow-on-the-Hill
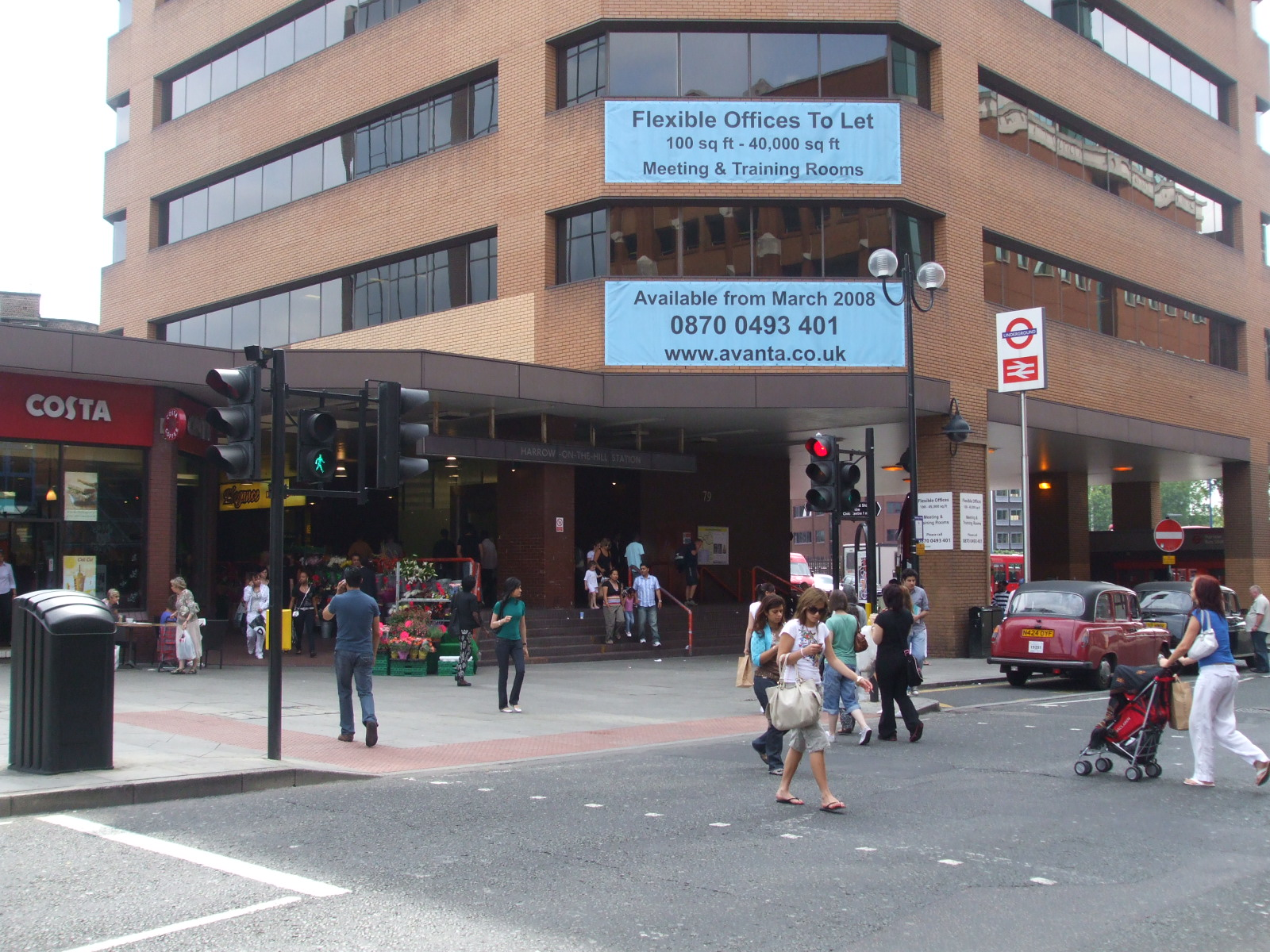
- North entrance, opposite shopping centre
- Interactive map of Harrow-on-the-Hill

General information
- Location: Harrow
- Local authority: London Borough of Harrow
- Managed by: London Underground
- Station code: HOH
- Number of platforms: 6
- Fare zone: 5

London Underground annual entry and exit
- 2021: ▼4.76 million
- 2022: ▲8.22 million
- 2023: ▲8.44 million
- 2024: ▼8.28 million
- 2025: ▲8.49 million

National Rail annual entry and exit
- 2020–21: ▼0.732 million
- 2021–22: ▲1.631 million
- 2022–23: ▲2.613 million
- 2023–24: ▲3.191 million
- 2024–25: ▼3.069 million

Key dates
- 2 August 1880: Opened as "Harrow"
- 1 June 1894: Renamed "Harrow-on-the-Hill"
- 3 April 1967: Goods yard closed

Other information
- External links: TfL station info page; Departures; Facilities
- Coordinates: 51.5794°N 0.3370°W

Harrow-on-the-Hill is an interchange railway station in Harrow, served by suburban London Underground services on the Metropolitan line and commuter National Rail services on the London–Aylesbury line. It is 9 miles 18 chains (9.23 mi; 14.85 km) down the line from London Marylebone. Harrow-on-the-Hill is the final Metropolitan line station from Central London before the line splits with the main branch towards Watford, Chesham or Amersham and the diverged Uxbridge branch towards Uxbridge. It is in London fare zone 5.

== History ==
The station was opened as "Harrow" on 2 August 1880, when the Metropolitan Railway was extended from its previous terminus at Willesden Green. Its name was changed to "Harrow-on-the-Hill" on 1 June 1894. Like some other Underground stations, the name is an example of marketing rather than precision; in this case the town "proper" of the same name is at the top of Harrow Hill (i.e. Harrow-on-the-Hill), while the station is located at the foot of the hill to the north, which at the time of opening was a small hamlet called Greenhill and has since become the main town proper of Harrow.

Had the governors of Harrow School not made objections during the planning stage, it is possible that the Metropolitan Railway might have followed a different route taking it closer to the high street on the hill. The station is at the heart of Metroland.

The National Rail service began as the Great Central Railway (GCR) on 15 March 1899. The GCR ran on the former Great Central Main Line, an intercity trunk route and provided services from Harrow to destinations such as Rugby, Leicester, Nottingham and Manchester. The passenger service north of Aylesbury ceased in 1966 due to the Beeching Axe. There was a goods yard, which closed on 3 April 1967.

== Railway geography ==
The station is a major junction with numerous crossovers north and south of station enabling flexibility when routing trains.

South of the station there are four LU tracks paired by direction as "Fast" and "Local" lines to/from Baker Street and two "Main line" tracks to/from Marylebone.

North of the station, the Uxbridge branch diverges from the other routes by means of a burrowing junction. Above this, Harrow North Junction separates the "Local line" towards North Harrow and the "Main line" towards Moor Park.

== Services ==
=== London Underground ===
London Underground services at Harrow-on-the-Hill are provided by the Metropolitan line. The adjacent Underground stations are Northwick Park (all stations southbound), Finchley Road (fast southbound), Moor Park (fast northbound), North Harrow (all stations northbound) and West Harrow (towards Uxbridge). The Metropolitan line is unique in operating an express service. "Fast" and "Semi-fast" services (now mostly reserved for peak times) do not stop between Harrow-on-the-Hill and Finchley Road. The "Fast" lines at stations between Moor Park, Harrow and Wembley Park have no platforms.

Southbound services go to either Baker Street (4tph) or continue beyond to the line's terminus at Aldgate (12tph). Off-peak trains from Amersham (2tph), Chesham (2tph) and Uxbridge (8tph) generally terminate at Aldgate, with a 4tph service from Watford to Baker Street, however during peak hours trains from all branches go to/from all destinations.

=== National Rail ===
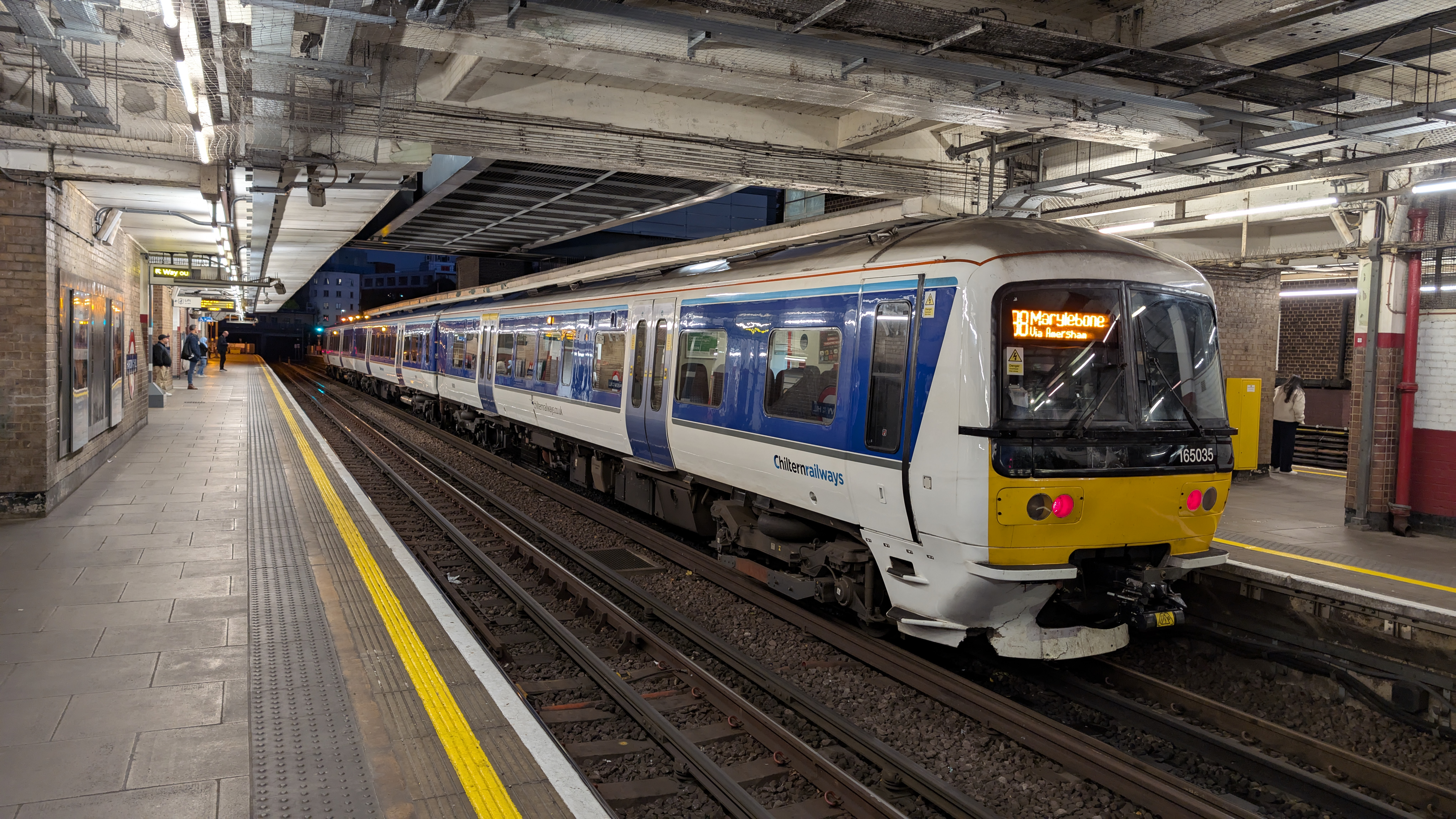
Chiltern railways class 165 bound for Marylebone

National Rail services at Harrow-on-the-Hill are provided by Chiltern Railways. Services operate between Marylebone station and Aylesbury using the separate Network Rail tracks from London to Harrow and sharing London Underground tracks between Harrow and Amersham. Chiltern Railways started operating in 1996 after the privatisation of British Rail and typically provide two trains per hour between Aylesbury and London via Harrow.

Preceding station	London Underground	Following station
Moor Park Fast (evening peak hours only) towards Amersham or Chesham	Metropolitan line	Wembley Park Fast/Semi-fast (special events only) towards Baker Street or Aldgate
North Harrow All stations towards Watford, Chesham or Amersham	Metropolitan line	Northwick Park All stations towards Baker Street or Aldgate
West Harrow towards Uxbridge	Metropolitan line	Finchley Road Fast/Semi-fast (peak hours only) towards Baker Street or Aldgate
Preceding station	National Rail	Following station
Rickmansworth	Chiltern Railways; London to Aylesbury Line	London Marylebone

== Station layout ==
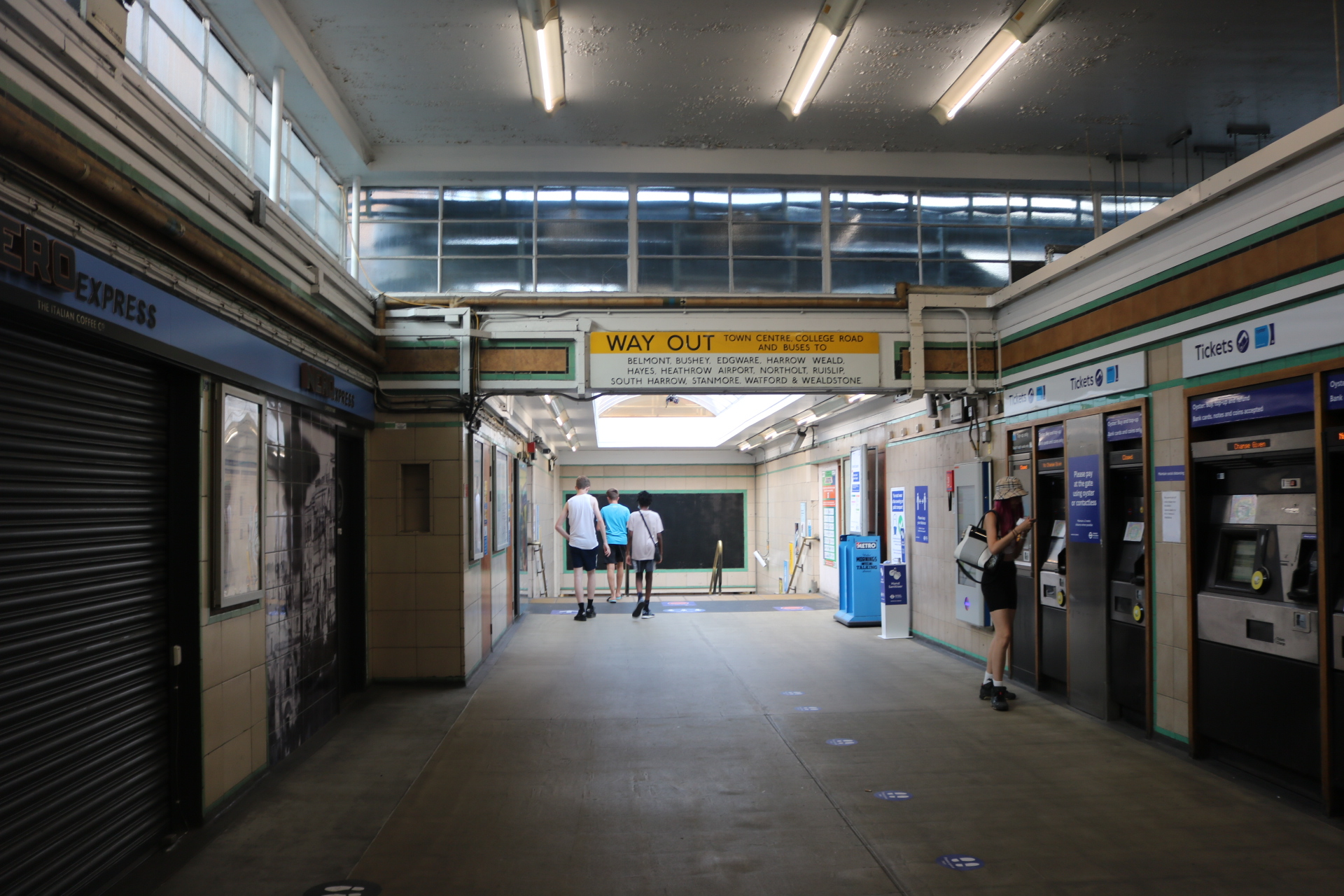
Inside the elevated station building, 2020

The station building is above ground with the six platforms in a cutting. Two (on the South side) are predominantly used by National Rail services and the other four by the Metropolitan line; the National Rail platforms are electrified with the London Underground system (normal services are operated by diesel trains) and incoming London Underground trains on some routes can be diverted into them should this be necessary during closures of tracks in the area.

The station has two entrances, one on Station Approach (leading to Lowlands Road and Harrow Hill) and one on College Road (for Harrow Bus Station and the main shopping area).

During opening hours the Station is popular as a shortcut, removing the longer walk via the bridge at Station Road, as it is possible to walk through the bridge and use the public toilets without passing through the ticket gates.

The present main station building replaced older structures at the London end of the platforms (thus leaving Station Road with no station); it consists of a circulating area above the tracks with stairways leading down to all platforms and both street entrances.

A pedestrian tunnel once connected all the platforms to the adjacent and now closed Post Office sorting office, whose site was redeveloped.

An office block called Avanta House was built in the 1980s on top of the station's College Road entrance.

Harrow-on-the-Hill gained step-free access from College Road as part of a tranche of access improvements; that work, which also introduced lifts to the platforms served by Chiltern Railways, was completed in March 2022.

== Bus station ==
There is a bus station located next to the station offering London Buses services right across North London.
