= Watford tube station =

London Underground station

Watford
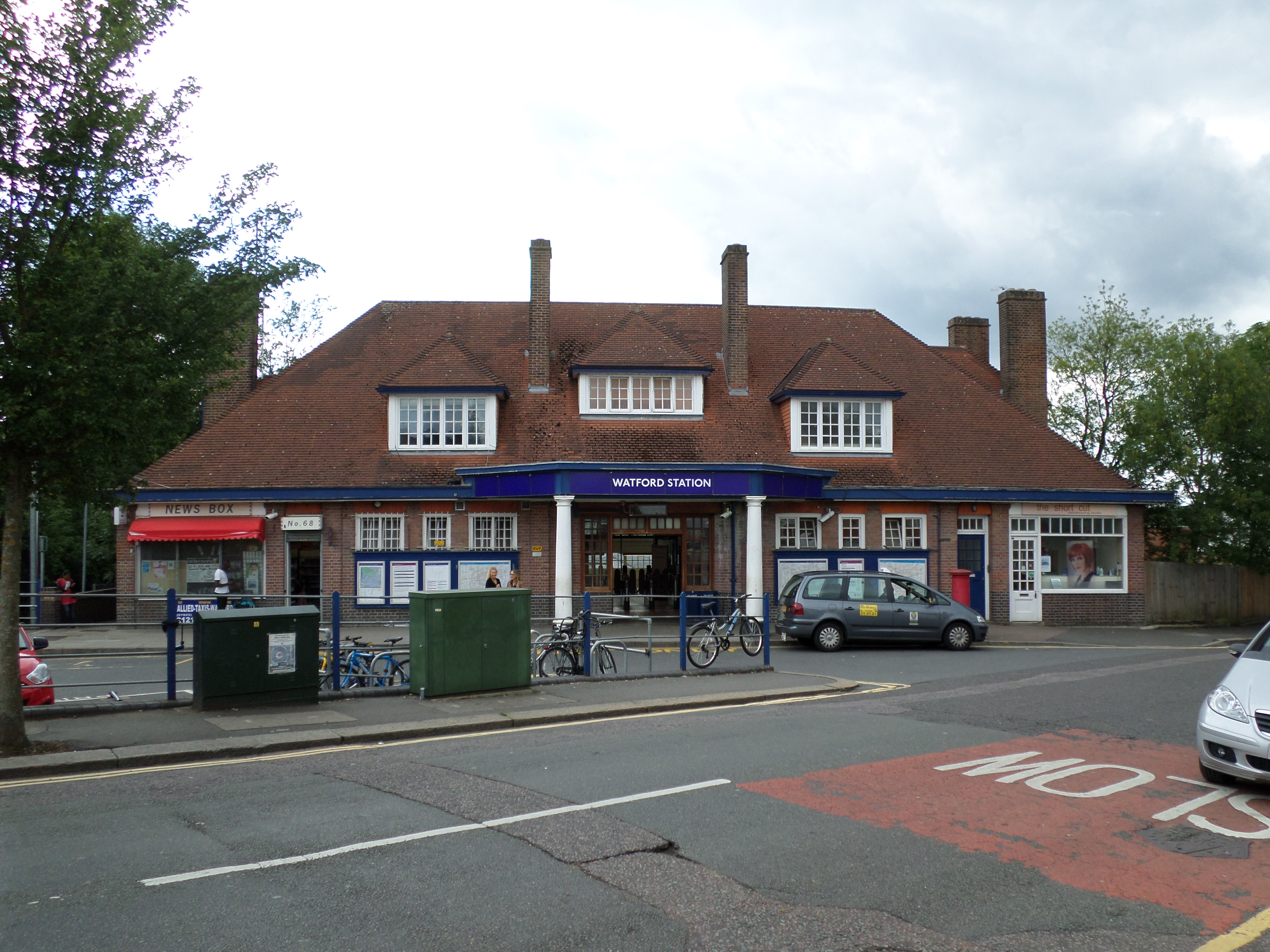
- Station entrance
- Interactive map of Watford

General information
- Location: Watford
- Local authority: Watford
- Managed by: London Underground
- Number of platforms: 2
- Fare zone: 7

London Underground annual entry and exit
- 2021: ▼0.96 million
- 2022: ▲1.68 million
- 2023: ▼1.65 million
- 2024: ▼1.63 million
- 2025: ▲1.71 million

Key dates
- 1925: Opened
- 14 November 1966: Goods yard closed

Other information
- External links: TfL station info page
- Coordinates: 51.6575°N 0.4175°W

Watford is a London Underground station in Watford, Hertfordshire. It is the northern terminus on its branch of the Metropolitan line and the next station towards London is Croxley. The station is in London fare zone 7. It was opened in 1925.

== Location and description ==
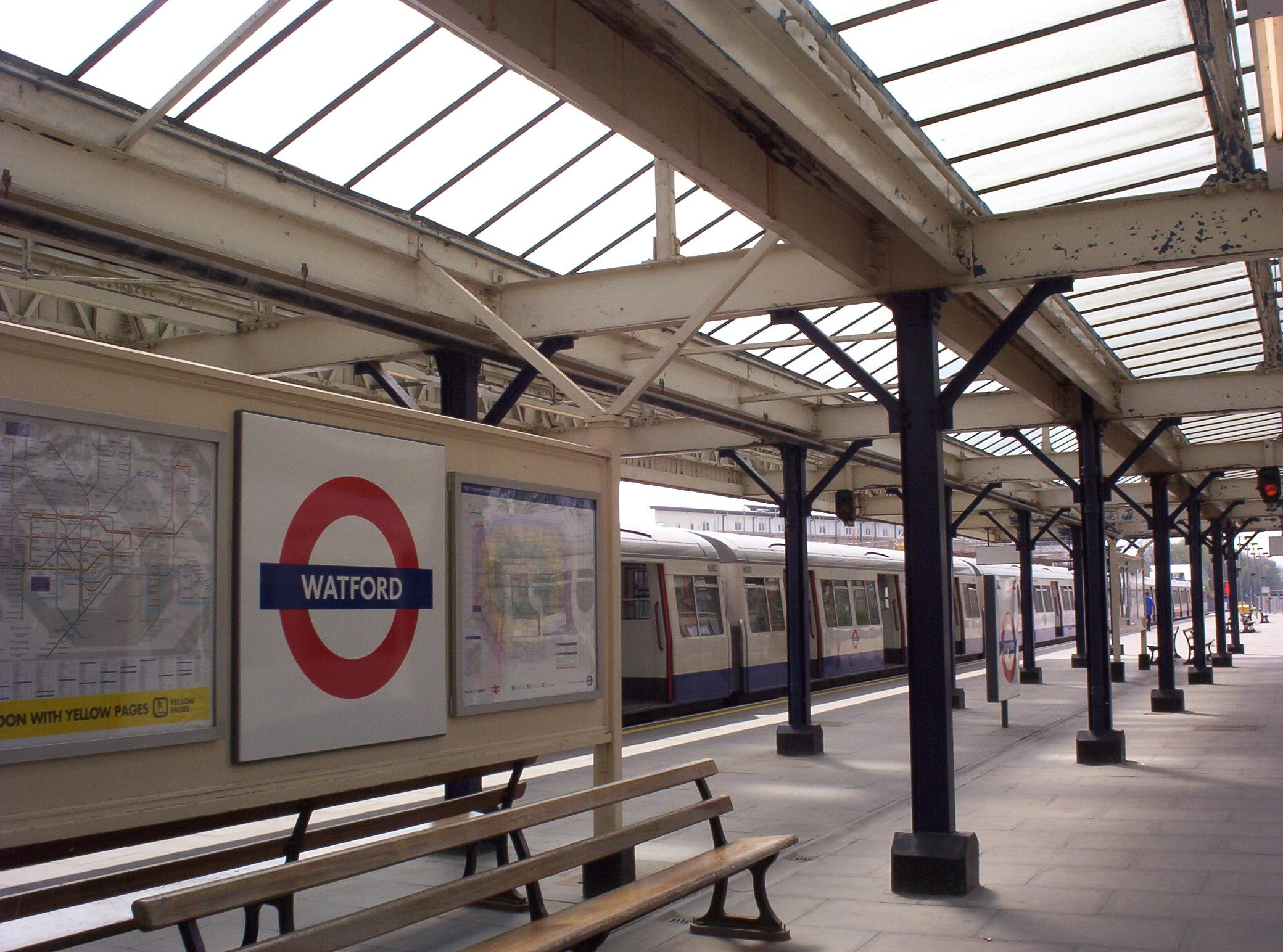
A platform at Watford tube station

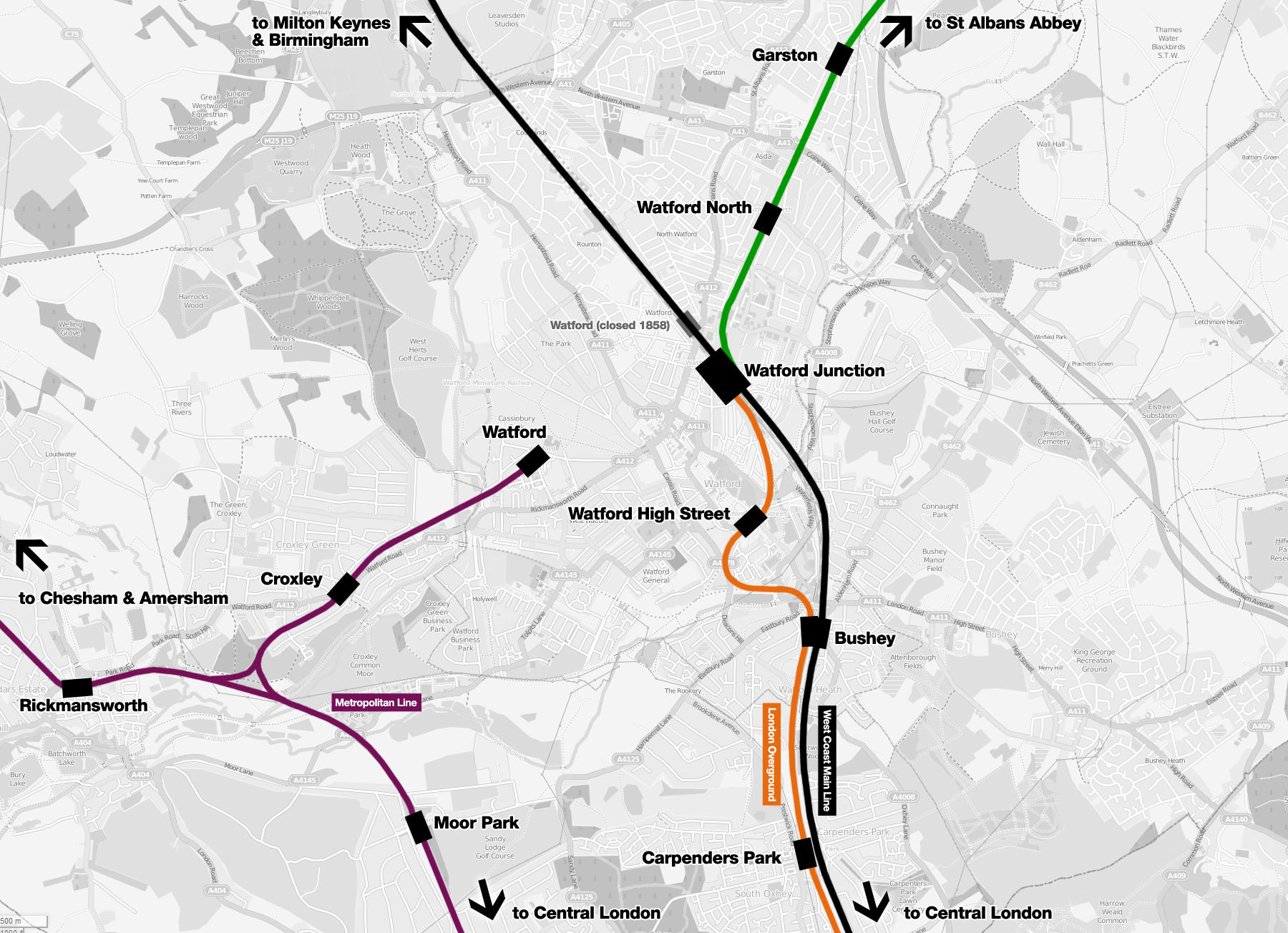
Map of local railways showing Watford station in relation to other stations

The station is located in the Cassiobury area, on Cassiobury Park Avenue at the junction with Metropolitan Station Approach, close to two of the entrances to Cassiobury Park. It is approximately 1 mile (1.6 km) from the town centre, which is more immediately served by Watford High Street and Watford Junction stations – the station's name has been criticised for being confusing to visitors. The station building was designed by the Metropolitan Railway's architect Charles Walter Clark in an Arts and Crafts vernacular style. It is in red brick with a clay-tiled hipped roof, tall brick chimney stacks, and timber sash and casement windows. The main entrance is covered by a polygonal metal canopy supported by twin Doric columns, and the interior, mostly unaltered from the original, is decorated with period tiling and hardwood panelling. The station building is Grade II listed.

According to data compiled in 2010, it is the 25th-least used station on the London Underground.

== History ==
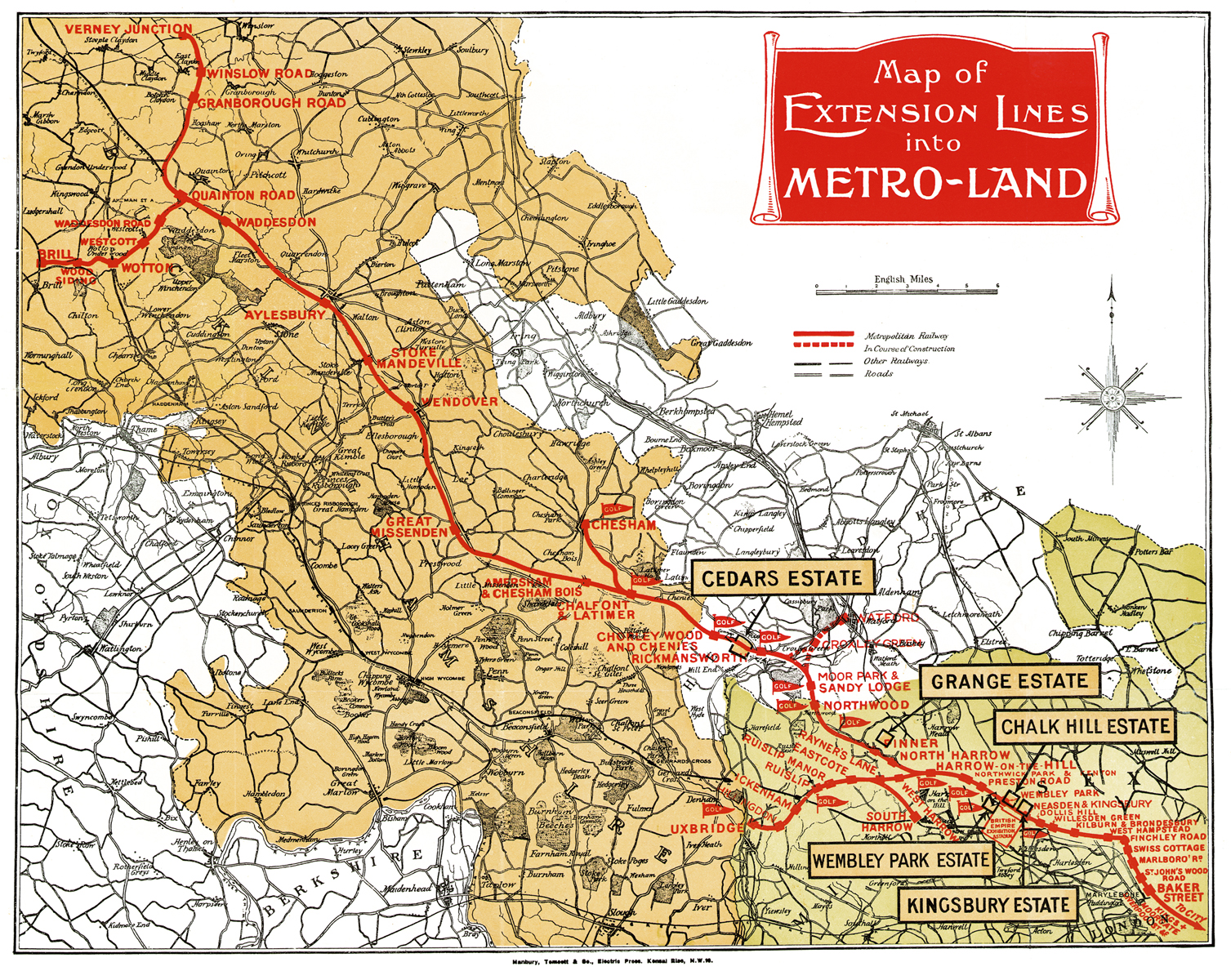
Map of "Metro-Land" showing the planned Watford extension (Metropolitan Railway, 1924)

In the early 20th century, the Metropolitan Railway (MR) penetrated Hertfordshire and Buckinghamshire with its suburban railway, enticing Londoners with its "Metro-Land" advertising campaign promoting the new railway as an opportunity to live in a rural location with easy transport to central London. The MR was also intent on providing a connection from Watford and planned a branch line from Moor Park via Croxley. The MR purchased a swathe of land from Gonville and Caius College, Cambridge along the planned route, and approval for the branch was granted in the Metropolitan Railway Act 1912 (2 & 3 Geo. 5. c. cii). The project was hampered by disagreements with the Watford Borough Council and by the outbreak of World War I in 1914, and construction of the 2.5-mile (4.0 km) branch did not begin until 1922. The MR experienced difficulties running the line across the River Gade and the Grand Junction Canal, and this pushed costs up to £300,000.

Watford MR station opened on 2 November 1925, with MR electric trains to Baker Street and LNER steam trains to Marylebone for the first few months. The Watford Observer commented on the opening that the new station was "likely to have a much greater effect on the town than is at present realised. Just as trade follows the flag, so population follows the railway". Posters published by the MR in 1925 promoting the new route "by Metro to Watford" depicted Watford High Street on market day, belying the remote location of the station.

For many years, the MR operated a bus service from the High Street in an effort to gain more passengers, but contrary to the Watford Observer's predictions patronage remained low. MR passenger numbers compared unfavourably with services into central London offered by the LMS and the UERL Bakerloo line from Watford Junction and Watford High Street, and after the General Strike of 1926 the LNER pulled out of the venture with the MR.

Watford tube station in Cassiobury Park Avenue was not originally planned to be the terminus of the Watford branch. The Metropolitan Railway Company's original plans drawn up in 1912 intended the line to continue through Cassiobury Park and beyond to Hempstead Road on an area known locally as 'The Wilderness', where West Herts College would later be built (opened in 1938).

Watford Council had recently bought part of the Cassiobury Estate and objected to the proposed railway through the town park and recreation gardens, and so the last section of the route was removed and the line would end abruptly in Cassiobury Park Avenue instead.

An opportunity arose in 1927 for another route to extend the line into the centre of Watford. Through a third party, the Metropolitan was able to purchase an existing building at 44 Watford High Street together with two-and-a-half acres of backlands, with the intention of creating a terminus in the town centre. The possibility of a single-track extension in tunnel—either from the existing station or following a diversionary route around the station—was explored, but costs were extremely high and no statutory powers were sought from Parliament. The High Street building was leased out and was eventually disposed of by London Transport in 1936, and today Watford station remains the terminus of the line, approximately one mile from the town centre.

The station was in Zone B; in 2004 it moved to Zone A, and in 2008 to Zone 7.

== Future ==
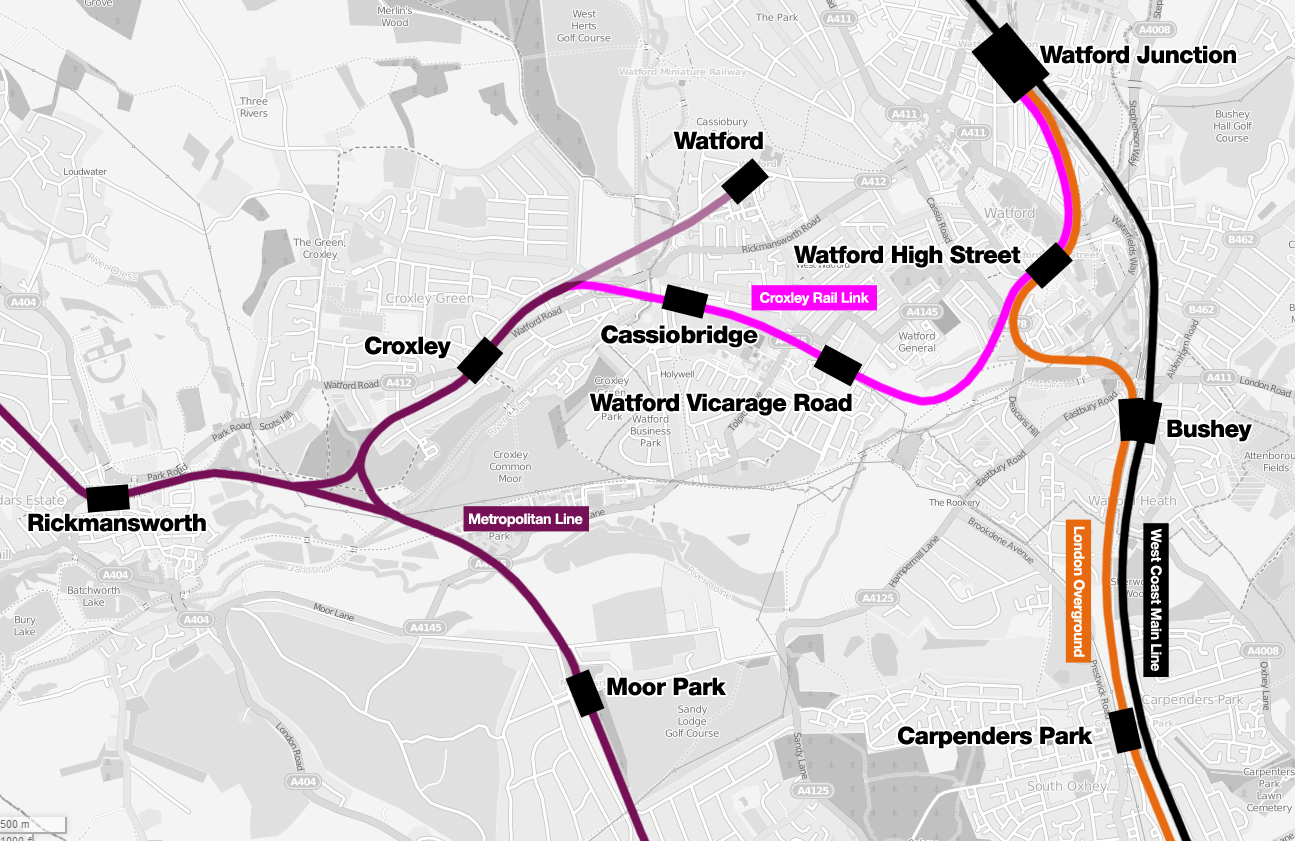
Croxley rail link map

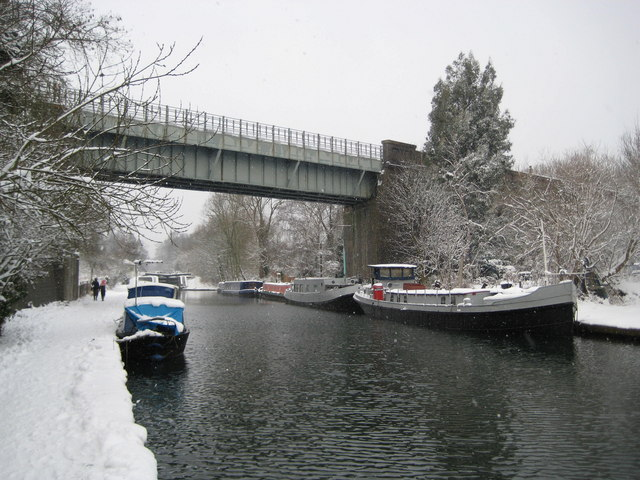
The existing Watford branch viaduct over the Grand Union Canal and River Gade

The ambition to extend the Metropolitan line into Watford town centre was revived around 1994 by London Regional Transport (LRT) when proposals were put forward to run the line to Watford Junction. The projected route was shown on an adapted version of the Tube map for internal planning purposes printed in that year. This project, known as the Croxley Rail Link, involved connecting the Metropolitan line to the disused Watford and Rickmansworth Railway line and reinstating the Croxley Green branch to Watford High Street. The line, opened in 1912, had been closed by British Rail in 1996 owing to low passenger numbers. Although it ran very close to the Metropolitan line (at its closest point about 200 metres away), the two lines were never linked. The plan was to connect the two lines via a short viaduct. The Croxley Rail Link project would have resulted in the closure of Watford station.

On 14 December 2011, the project was given approval by the Department for Transport at an expected cost of £115.9 million with a proposed completion date of January 2016, later revised to 2020. The planned closure of Watford station met with some local opposition, and campaigners lobbied for the station to remain open with a reduced shuttle service. A report compiled in 2012 by the transport watchdog London TravelWatch concluded that the opening of new stations on the route would mitigate any inconvenience caused by the closure, and that a minority of passengers would experience an increase in journey times of more than 15 minutes. It also recommended that a shuttle train service should be trialled, and that in the event of closure a bus service should be provided from Cassiobury to one of the new stations.

On 25 January 2017, the Watford Observer newspaper published an update on the Croxley Rail Link confirming work had stopped as there was an ongoing funding issue.

== Services ==
Watford station is the northern terminus on its branch of the Metropolitan line in London fare zone 7. The next station is Croxley to the south. As of December 2011, the typical off-peak service was four trains per hour to Baker Street, with a limited service to Aldgate at peak times.

Preceding station	London Underground	Following station
Terminus	Metropolitan line Watford branch	Croxley towards Baker Street or Aldgate
Abandoned Watford Central Extension
Watford Central Terminus	Metropolitan line	Croxley towards Baker Street or Aldgate

== See also ==
- Croxley Rail Link
- Croxley tube station
- Watford Junction
- Watford High Street railway station

== Bibliography ==
- Horne, Mike (2003). The Metropolitan Line: an Illustrated History. Capital Transport Publishing. ISBN 1854142755.
