= Chesham tube station =

London Underground station

Chesham
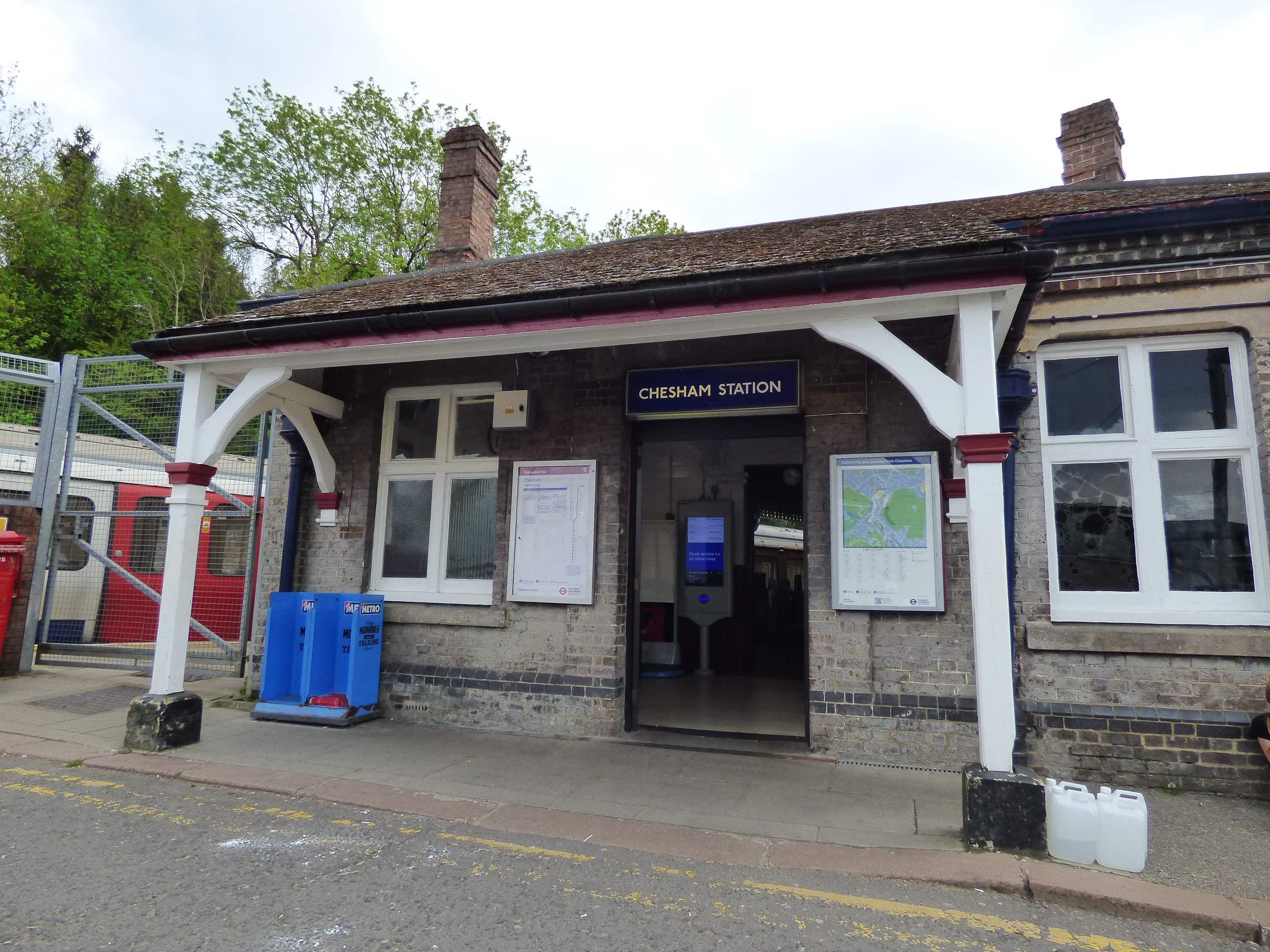
- Station entrance
- Interactive map of Chesham

General information
- Location: Chesham
- Local authority: Buckinghamshire
- Grid reference: SP960016
- Managed by: London Underground
- Number of platforms: 1
- Accessible: Yes
- Fare zone: 9

London Underground annual entry and exit
- 2021: ▼0.51 million
- 2022: ▲0.87 million
- 2023: ▲0.97 million
- 2024: ▲0.98 million
- 2025: ▲1.01 million

Key dates
- 1889: Opened
- 1966: Goods yard closed

Other information
- External links: TfL station info page
- Coordinates: 51.7052°N 0.6113°W

Chesham tube station is a London Underground station in the market town of Chesham in Buckinghamshire, England. It was opened on 8 July 1889 by the Metropolitan Railway (MR). It is the terminus station of the Chesham branch of the Metropolitan line, which runs from Chalfont & Latimer. The station, a Grade II listed building, is in London fare zone 9 (previously zone D).

Chesham station is 25 miles (40 km) northwest of Charing Cross, making it the furthest London Underground station from central London. It is both the northernmost and westernmost station in the system. The distance between Chesham and Chalfont & Latimer is the longest between adjacent stations on the network, at 3.89 miles (6.26 km).

== History ==
The station was opened on 8 July 1889 by the Metropolitan Railway as the company's temporary northern terminus when the railway was extended from Rickmansworth. The line had been intended to extend to Tring railway station with connections to the London and North Western Railway's West Coast Main Line. However, before work was begun, the MR chose an alternative route across the Chilterns via Aylesbury. The line to Chesham was retained as a branch from the new route and construction began in late 1887. Although the MR continued to buy land between Chesham and Tring for some years after the station's opening, the route was never extended further. The station building complex has remained almost unchanged.

The station originally had a goods yard, which closed in July 1966. The goods yard site by 1994 was the car park for the station and a Waitrose supermarket. When the line was electrified a bay platform was added, but proved unnecessary and closed in November 1970. (Note: The three track layout may be seen during the opening credits of John Betjeman's TV documentary Metro-land.)

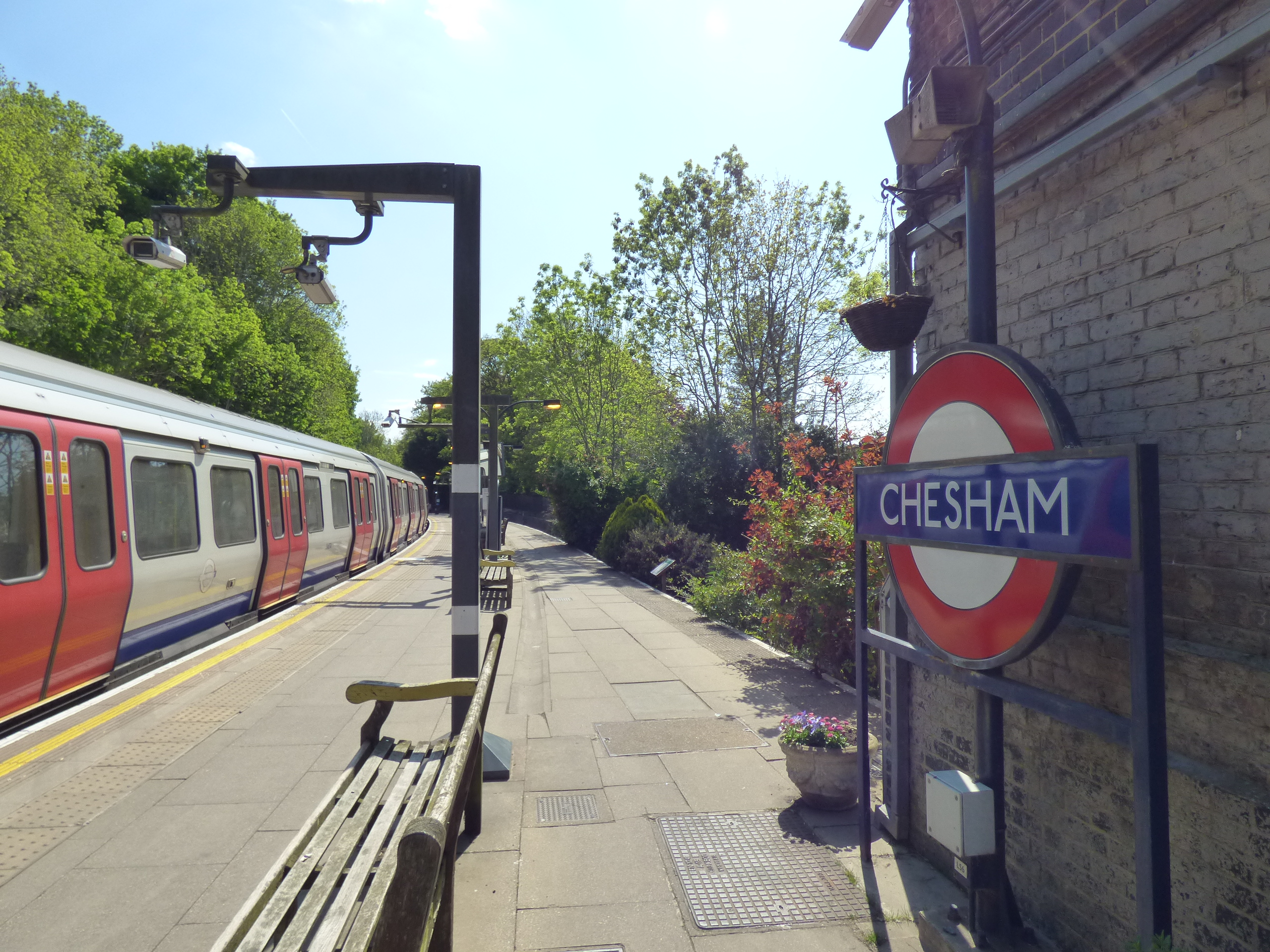
Chesham Station's single platform

On 16 and 17 August 2014 the branch line celebrated its 125th anniversary of operating. It was celebrated using London Underground's first steam locomotive, Metropolitan 1. It ran from Rickmansworth to Chesham (with the first and last service of each day starting or ending at Harrow-on-the-Hill to allow stabling of the set at Ruislip), meaning that the line from Chalfont and Latimer to Chesham had to be closed for a period of time to allow for the special service.

== Grade II listed building ==
The station is a Grade II listed building. The reasons for listing the station at this level were:

- Architectural interest: the most complete surviving example of a late-C19 rural Metropolitan station
- Historic interest: a vivid reminder of the Metropolitan Railway's early expansion into London's rural hinterland
- Ensemble value: the station building, signal box and water tower form an unusually coherent and intact group.

== Services ==
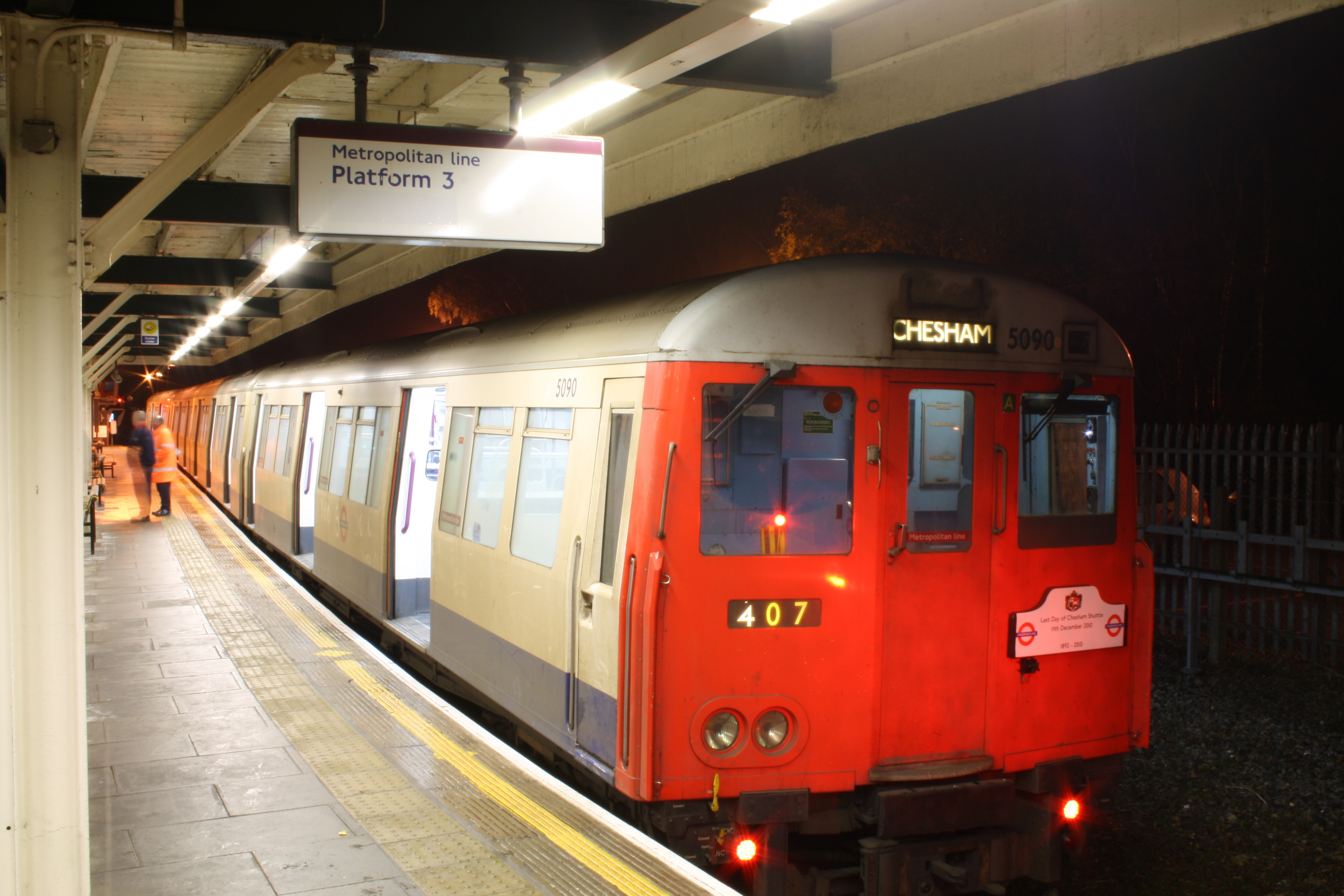
The Chesham Shuttle on the last official day of operation at Chalfont & Latimer.

Since 12 December 2010, Chesham has had an 8-car train every 30 minutes direct to Aldgate. In the morning and evening peak, trains run non-stop between Moor Park and Harrow-on-the-Hill, then calling at Finchley Road and all stations to Aldgate. During off-peak times, trains now call at all stations to Aldgate. For Chesham residents this is a major improvement, as previously Chesham was served in the off-peak solely by a 4-car shuttle train to Chalfont & Latimer, where passengers had to change onto a train to or from Amersham. Although the reasons for the new service pattern were largely technical (the S8 Stock, while designed as two four-car trains, cannot be split into four-car trains as they have driving cabs only at the outer end of each unit), it was expected to ease congestion on local roads by increasing Chesham's attractiveness to park-and-ride commuters.

Preceding station	London Underground	Following station
Terminus	Metropolitan line Chesham branch	Chalfont & Latimer towards Baker Street or Aldgate

== Bibliography ==
- Foxell, Clive (1996). Chesham Shuttle (2 ed.). Chesham: Clive Foxell. ISBN 0-9529184-0-4.
- Simpson, Bill (2004). A History of the Metropolitan Railway. Vol. 2. Witney: Lamplight Publications. ISBN 1-899246-08-8.
