= Aldgate tube station =

London Underground station

Aldgate
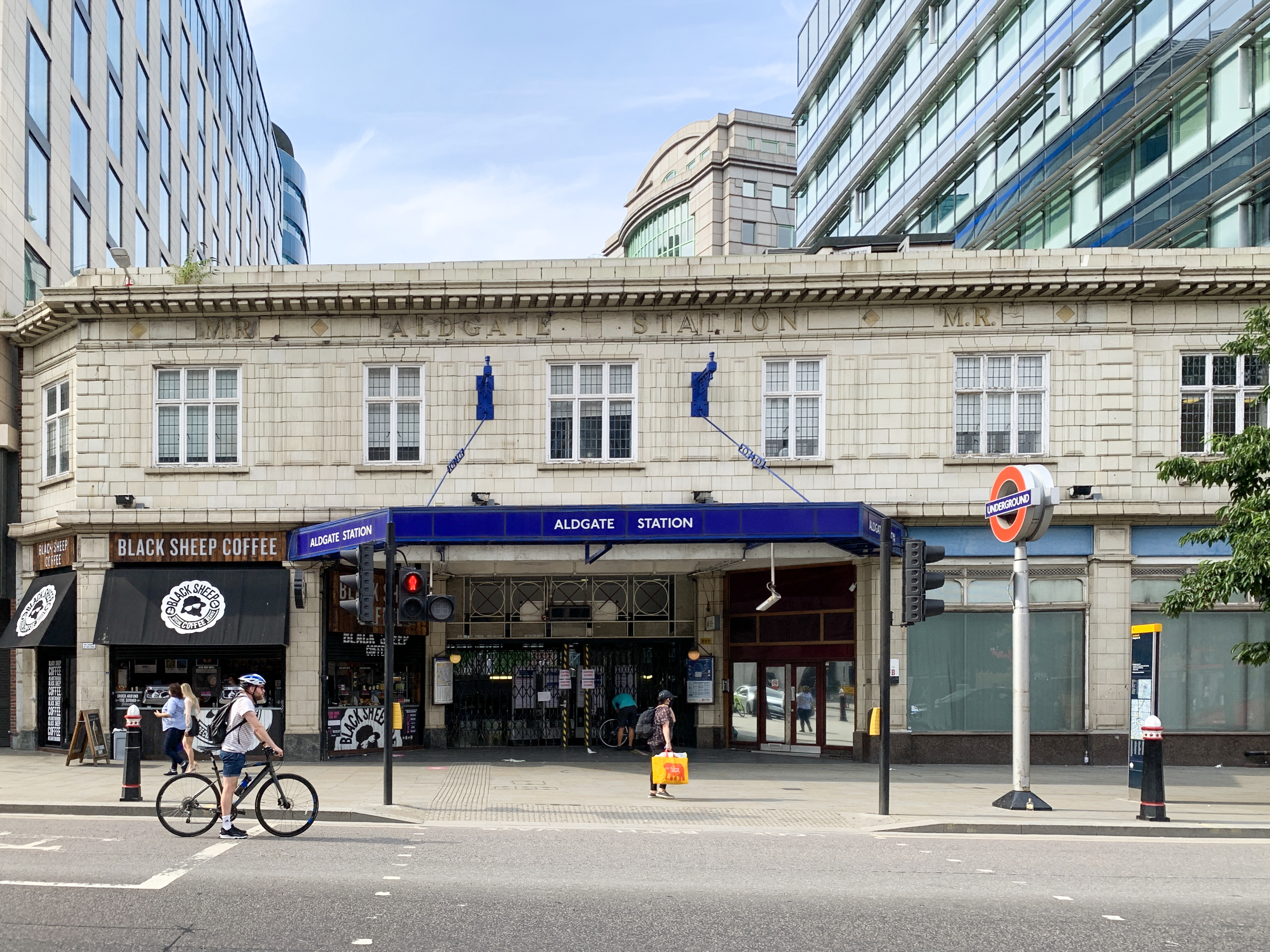
- Station entrance
- Interactive map of Aldgate

General information
- Location: Portsoken
- Local authority: City of London
- Managed by: London Underground
- Number of platforms: 4
- Fare zone: 1
- OSI: Aldgate East Fenchurch Street Tower Gateway

London Underground annual entry and exit
- 2020: ▼2.78 million
- 2021: ▲3.53 million
- 2022: ▲6.90 million
- 2023: 6.90 million
- 2024: ▲7.27 million

Key dates
- 18 November 1876: Opened

Other information
- External links: TfL station info page
- Coordinates: 51.514°N 0.076°W

Aldgate (/ˈɔːldɡeɪt/) is a London Underground station near Aldgate in the City of London. It is on the Circle line between Liverpool Street and Tower Hill stations. It is also the eastern terminus of the Metropolitan line and the next station towards west is Liverpool Street. The station is in London fare zone 1.

Aldgate was opened in 1876 with its entrance on Aldgate High Street. A station named Aldgate East opened nearby eight years later and is served today by the District and Hammersmith & City lines.

== History ==
The route first proposed ran south from Moorgate to Cannon Street, but this was soon amended to the present alignment to allow connection with three additional termini: Liverpool Street, Broad Street, and Fenchurch Street. However, this change also forced an awkward doubling-back at Aldgate, reducing the desirability of the line for local traffic and greatly increasing the cost of construction due to high prices in the City of London. Construction was also delayed because the station was on the site of a plague pit behind St Botolph's Aldgate which contains an estimated 1,000 bodies.

Aldgate station was opened on 18 November 1876, with a southbound extension to Tower Hill opening on 25 September 1882, completing the Circle (line). Services from Aldgate originally ran further west than they do now, reaching as far as Richmond. Aldgate became the terminus of the Metropolitan line in 1941. Before that, Metropolitan trains had continued on to the southern termini of the East London Line.

In 2005, one of four suicide bombers involved in the 7 July terrorist attacks detonated a device on a C-stock Circle line train from Liverpool Street as it was approaching Aldgate. Seven passengers were killed in the bombing. Of the stations affected by the bombings, Aldgate was the first to be reopened, once police had handed back control of the site to London Underground following an extensive search for evidence. After the damaged tunnel was repaired by Metronet engineers, the lines were reopened. This allowed the Metropolitan line to be fully restored, since the closure had meant all trains had to be terminated two stations early, at Moorgate.

== Design ==
The station building has a six-bay façade clad in white faïence with original features including 1920s shopfronts with green marble and pink granite stallrisers, a half-hexagonal canopy of glass and metal suspended by elegant metal ties, leaded light first floor windows, dentil cornice, two ornamental lamp brackets and a frieze bearing moulded lettering and the Metropolitan Railway monogram. The train shed of 1876 survives, hidden from the street by the later station frontage building erected in 1926. This was designed by Charles Walter Clark the Metropolitan Railway's chief architect between 1911 and 1933. (Note: Clark designed other station buildings for the Metropolitan Railway in this period to a similar design faced in the same white faïence such as Farringdon (1922 – Grade II listed), Edgware Road (1928) and Willesden Green (1925 – Grade II listed), the Grade II* listed Baker Street station and the Chiltern Court apartment building that rises above it (completed in 1929). He also designed outer suburban stations on the line to Stanmore (1932).)

== Connections ==
London Buses day and night routes serve the station.

== Services ==
Aldgate station is on the Circle and Metropolitan lines in London fare zone 1.

=== Circle line ===
On the Circle line, Aldgate station is between Liverpool Street to the west and Tower Hill to the east. The typical off-peak service measured in trains per hour (tph) is:

- 6 tph clockwise to Edgware Road via Embankment;
- 6 tph anti-clockwise to Hammersmith via King's Cross St. Pancras.

=== Metropolitan line ===
Aldgate station is the eastern terminus of the Metropolitan line and the next station is Liverpool Street to the west. The typical off-peak service in trains per hour is:

- 2 tph northbound to Amersham;
- 2 tph northbound to Chesham;
- 8 tph northbound to Uxbridge.
- 12 tph terminating at Aldgate

During peak hours there are also additional fast and semi-fast Metropolitan line services, with some following the route to and from Watford.

Preceding station	London Underground	Following station
Liverpool Street towards Hammersmith via King's Cross St Pancras	Circle line	Tower Hill towards Edgware Road via Victoria
Liverpool Street towards Uxbridge, Amersham, Chesham or Watford	Metropolitan line	Terminus
Former services
Preceding station	London Underground	Following station
Liverpool Street towards Edgware Road via King's Cross St Pancras	Circle line (1884–1967)	Mark Lane towards Edgware Road via Victoria
