= Statue of Sherlock Holmes, London =

Statue in London by John Doubleday

Sherlock Holmes
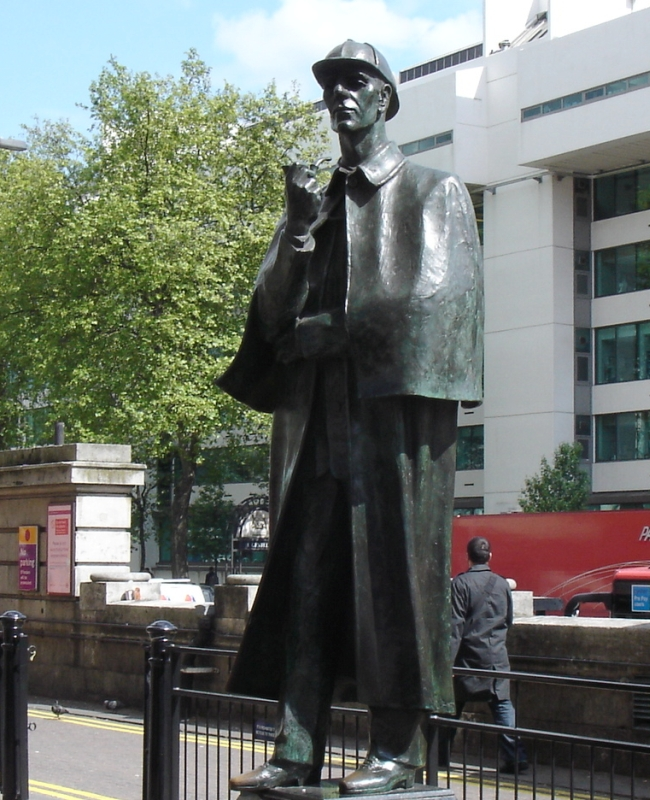
- Artist: John Doubleday
- Year: 1999; 27 years ago
- Type: Pedestrian statue
- Medium: Bronze
- Subject: Sherlock Holmes
- Location: London, NW1 United Kingdom; 51.52250°N 0.15659°W

A statue of Sherlock Holmes by the sculptor John Doubleday stands near the supposed site of 221B Baker Street, the fictional detective's address in London. Unveiled on 23 September 1999, the sculpture was funded by the Abbey National building society, whose headquarters were on the purported site of the famous address. As no site was available on Baker Street itself the statue was installed outside Baker Street tube station, on Marylebone Road. Doubleday had previously produced a statue of Holmes for the town of Meiringen in Switzerland, below the Reichenbach Falls whence the detective fell to his apparent death in the 1893 story "The Final Problem".

== Description ==
The 3-metre-high (9.8 ft) statue depicts Holmes wearing an Inverness cape and a deerstalker, attributes first given to him by Sidney Paget, the illustrator of Arthur Conan Doyle's stories for The Strand Magazine, and holding a calabash pipe (which appears to be a later addition).

It is located outside Baker Street tube station on Marylebone Road, two blocks from the detective's fictional home at 221B Baker Street, and near the Sherlock Holmes Museum between numbers 237 and 241.

== History ==
In 1927 G. K. Chesterton was the first person to suggest that a statue of Holmes be sited in London, but his efforts came to nothing. A new campaign was begun by the Sherlock Holmes Society of London in 1996. Before then the society had, according to its president Anthony Howlett, spent "a decade or two debating whether we should put a statue smack in the middle of Baker Street, and the traffic be damned". The Sherlock Holmes Statue Company Limited was set up to manage the project. In 1998, Abbey National agreed to fund the statue because of their connection with Holmes. (Their headquarters were at 215−229 Baker Street and they employed a member of staff to respond to any letters addressed to Holmes at 221B.)

John Doubleday, the sculptor of the first statue of Holmes at Meiringen, was given the commission for the London statue on 31 March 1998. After the plans to install the statue were announced some local residents and the St Marylebone Society spoke out against the work, saying that it was "not very appropriate. It should have been in Baker Street itself, which is much quieter." The statue was unveiled by Lord Tugendhat, the chairman of Abbey National, on 23 September 1999.

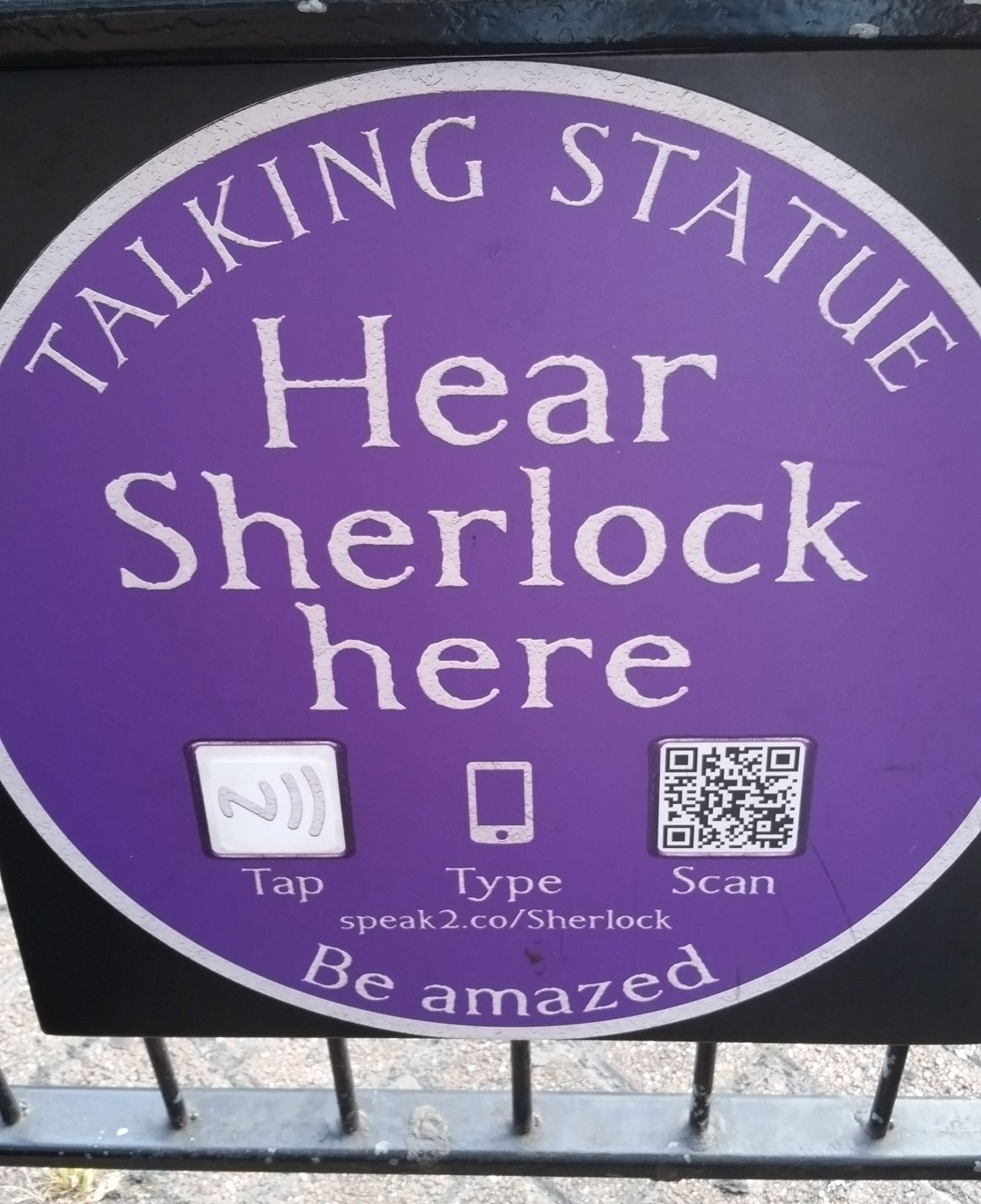
Talking Statues plaque for the statue of Sherlock Holmes

Since 2014, Doubleday's sculpture has been one of a series of "Talking Statues" across London where passers-by can receive a simulated telephone call from the statue's subject by scanning a QR code or visiting a link. The Holmes statue is voiced by the actor Ed Stoppard with a script written by the English novelist Anthony Horowitz which humorously gives details relating to the statue's appearance.

== Other statues of Sherlock Holmes ==
Before London received its statue of Sherlock Holmes examples had already been installed in 1988 in Meiringen, also in 1988 in Karuizawa (Japan) and in 1991 on the site of Conan-Doyle's birthplace in Edinburgh. In 2007, a statue of Sherlock Holmes and Dr. Watson was erected in Moscow near the British embassy.
