= Great Portland Street tube station =

London Underground station

Great Portland Street
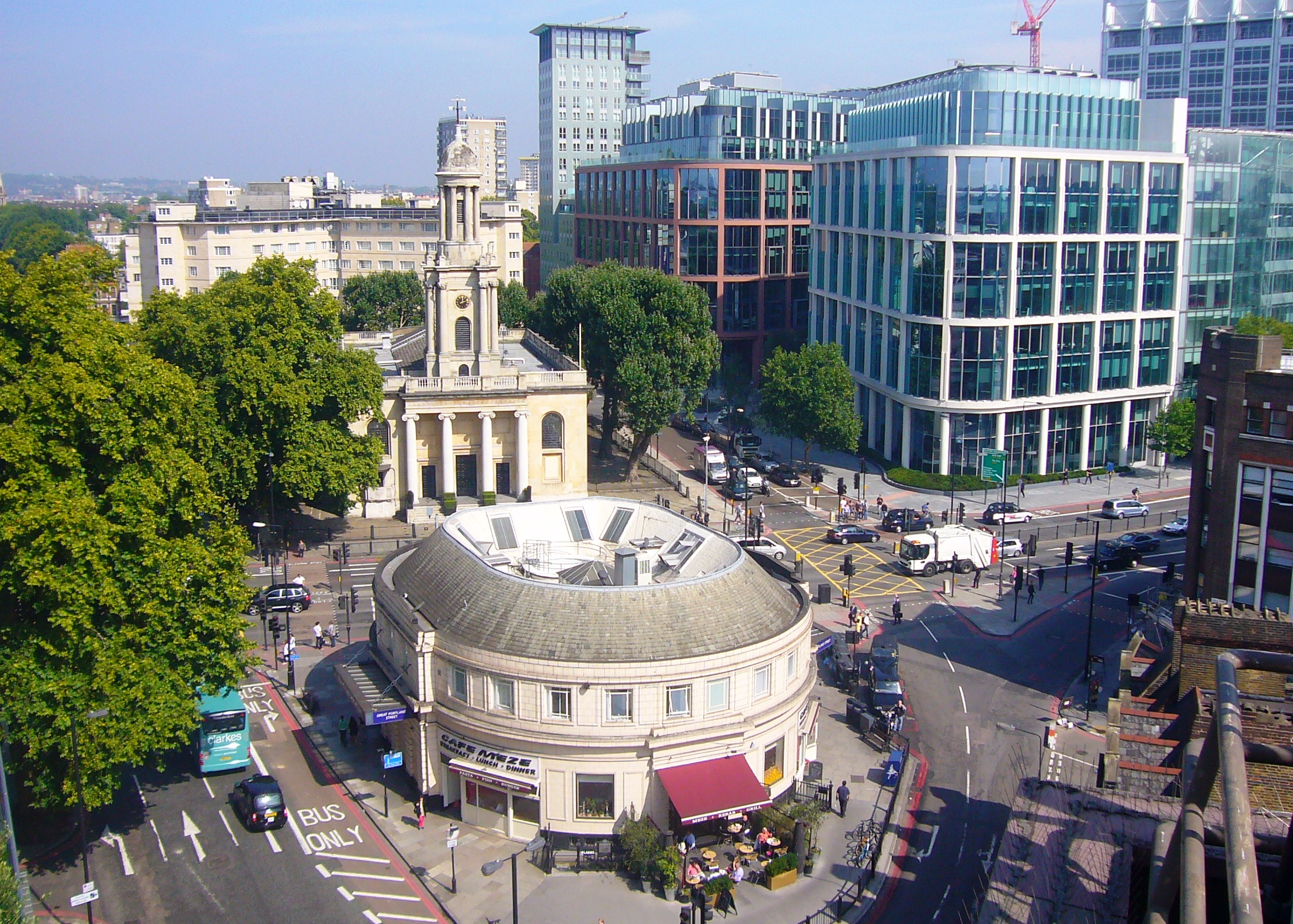
- Station as seen from above looking north towards Regents Place
- Interactive map of Great Portland Street

General information
- Location: Great Portland Street
- Local authority: City of Westminster
- Managed by: London Underground
- Number of platforms: 2
- Fare zone: 1

London Underground annual entry and exit
- 2021: ▲2.69 million
- 2022: ▲5.16 million
- 2023: ▲5.35 million
- 2024: ▲5.67 million
- 2025: ▲5.68 million

Key dates
- 10 January 1863: Opened

Other information
- External links: TfL station info page
- Coordinates: 51.5238°N 0.1438°W

Great Portland Street is a London Underground station, located in Great Portland Street, London. It is on the Circle, Hammersmith & City and Metropolitan lines, between Baker Street and Euston Square stations. It is in London fare zone 1. The station is a Grade II listed building. It is situated 190 metres (210 yd) east of Regent's Park tube station on the same arterial road.

== History ==
The station was part of the world's first underground railway, the Metropolitan Railway, which opened between "Bishop's Road" (now Paddington on the Hammersmith & City line) and "Farringdon Street" (close to the present-day Farringdon station). It was opened on 10 January 1863 as "Portland Road", changed to its present name on 1 March 1917, was renamed "Great Portland Street and Regents Park" in 1923 and then reverted to its current name in 1933. The current structure was built in 1930 on a traffic island on the Marylebone Road at its intersection with Great Portland Street and Albany Street. Its construction is a steel framed cream terracotta clad exterior, with the perimeter providing shops and originally a car showroom, with office space over the station. Great Portland Street was at a major sales location for the motor industry. It was designed by the Metropolitan Railway's architect C. W. Clark and was Grade II-listed in January 1987.

The station lies at the northern end of Great Portland Street – a main road which marks the border between Marylebone and Fitzrovia. Regent's Park station, which is served by Bakerloo line, is within walking distance to the west of the station; however, out-of-station interchange fares do not apply and both journeys will continue to be charged separately.

The local neighbourhood plan from 2017 identified the gyratory around Great Portland Street Underground Station as one where public realm improvements and traffic calming should be made.

== Services ==
Great Portland Street station is on the Circle, Hammersmith & City and Metropolitan lines in London fare zone 1. It is between Baker Street to the west and Euston Square to the east. All three lines share the same pair of tracks from Baker Street Junction to Aldgate Junction making this section of track one of the most intensely used on the network.

=== Circle line ===
The typical service in trains per hour (tph) is:

- 6 tph clockwise via Kings Cross St Pancras and Liverpool Street
- 6 tph anti-clockwise to Hammersmith via Paddington

=== Hammersmith & City line ===
The typical service in trains per hour (tph) is:

- 6 tph eastbound to Barking
- 6 tph westbound to Hammersmith via Paddington

=== Metropolitan line ===
The typical off-peak service in trains per hour (tph) is:

- 12 tph eastbound to Aldgate
- 12 tph westbound via Baker Street:
  - 2 tph to Amersham
  - 2 tph to Chesham
  - 8 tph to Uxbridge

The typical peak time service in trains per hour (tph) is:

- 14 tph eastbound to Aldgate
- 14 tph westbound via Baker Street:
  - 2 tph to Amersham
  - 2 tph to Chesham
  - 4 tph to Watford
  - 6 tph to Uxbridge

Preceding station	London Underground	Following station
Baker Street towards Hammersmith	Circle line	Euston Square towards Edgware Road via Aldgate
Baker Street towards Hammersmith	Hammersmith & City line	Euston Square towards Barking
Baker Street towards Uxbridge, Amersham, Chesham or Watford	Metropolitan line	Euston Square towards Aldgate
Former services
Baker Street towards Hammersmith	Metropolitan line Hammersmith branch (1864–1990)	Euston Square towards Barking
