= Marylebone Road =

Road in London, England

Coordinates: 51°31′12″N 0°10′30″W

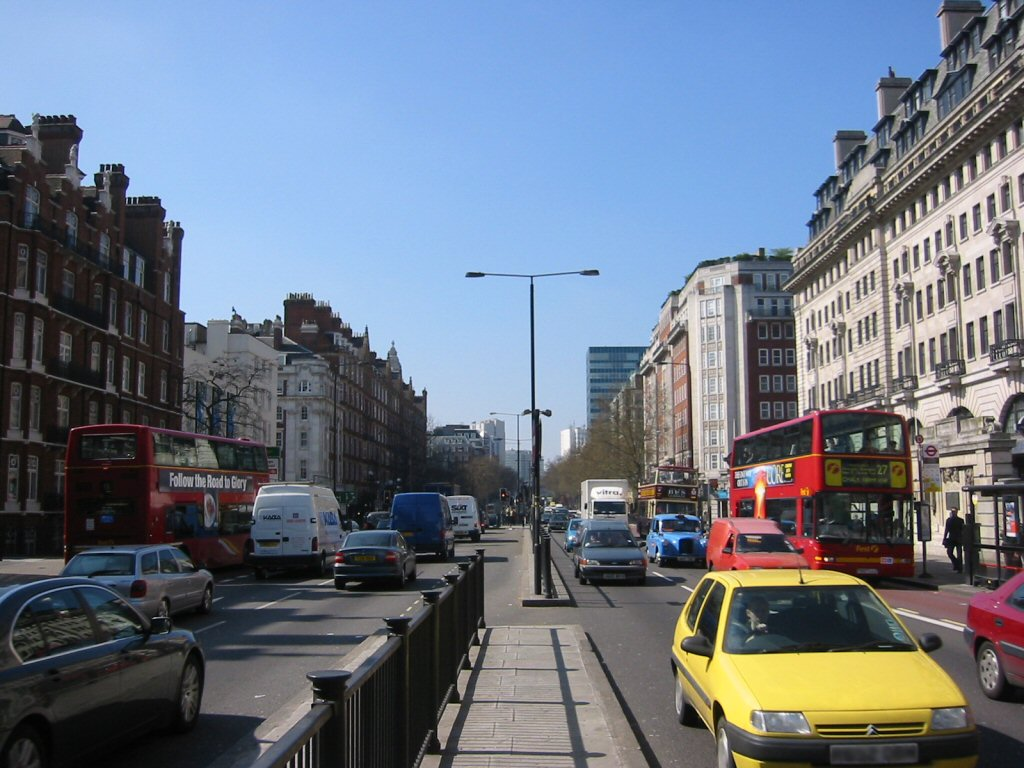
Marylebone Road, London, looking west towards the junction with Baker Street

Marylebone Road (/ˈmɑːrlɪbən/ MAR-li-bən) is an important thoroughfare in central London, within the City of Westminster. It runs east–west from the Euston Road at Regent's Park to the A40 Westway at Paddington. The road which runs in three lanes in both directions, is part of the London Inner Ring Road and as such forms part of the boundary of the zone within which the London congestion charge applies.

As part of the ring road and a feeder route to the A40 (and hence the M40 motorway) (to the west) and the A5 and M1 motorway (to the north) much of the traffic leaving central London for the Midlands and the North of England travels on this road. It is frequently heavily congested.

== History ==
The road was effectively London's first bypass. Construction of the New Road, as it was called, began in 1756 along the northern edge of the built-up area. In 1857, the road's name was changed from New Road, with sections, west to east, renamed Marylebone Road, Euston Road and Pentonville Road.

The name Marylebone originates from a church, called "St Mary Le Bon", that was built on the bank of a small stream or "bourne" called the tybourne, in an area named after the stream Tyburn. The church and the surrounding area later became known as St Mary at the bourne, which over time became shortened to its present form Marylebone. The current St Marylebone Parish Church is on the south of Marylebone Road, opposite the Royal Academy of Music and at the top of Marylebone High Street.

The crossroads of Marylebone Road and Baker Street was historically known as Marylebone Circus, which is still its unofficial name.

== Properties ==
One of London's principal tourist attractions, Madame Tussauds, lies on Marylebone Road. The Royal Academy of Music and the former "Great Central Hotel", now renamed The Landmark London, are also on this road. Premises at 25 Marylebone Road, which operated as Methodist Church House from 1995 to 2022, were built in 1939 for the Methodist Missionary Society to foster the commissioning and reception of Mission Partners from many countries.

== Transport ==
=== Mainline stations ===
- Marylebone
- Paddington

=== Tube stations ===
- Edgware Road (Bakerloo Line)
- Edgware Road (Circle, District and Hammersmith & City Lines)
- Marylebone
- Paddington
- Baker Street
- Regent's Park
- Great Portland Street

=== Buses ===
Bus routes 18, 27, 30, 74, 205 and 453 serve all or part of the road.
