= Baker Street tube station =

London Underground station

Baker Street
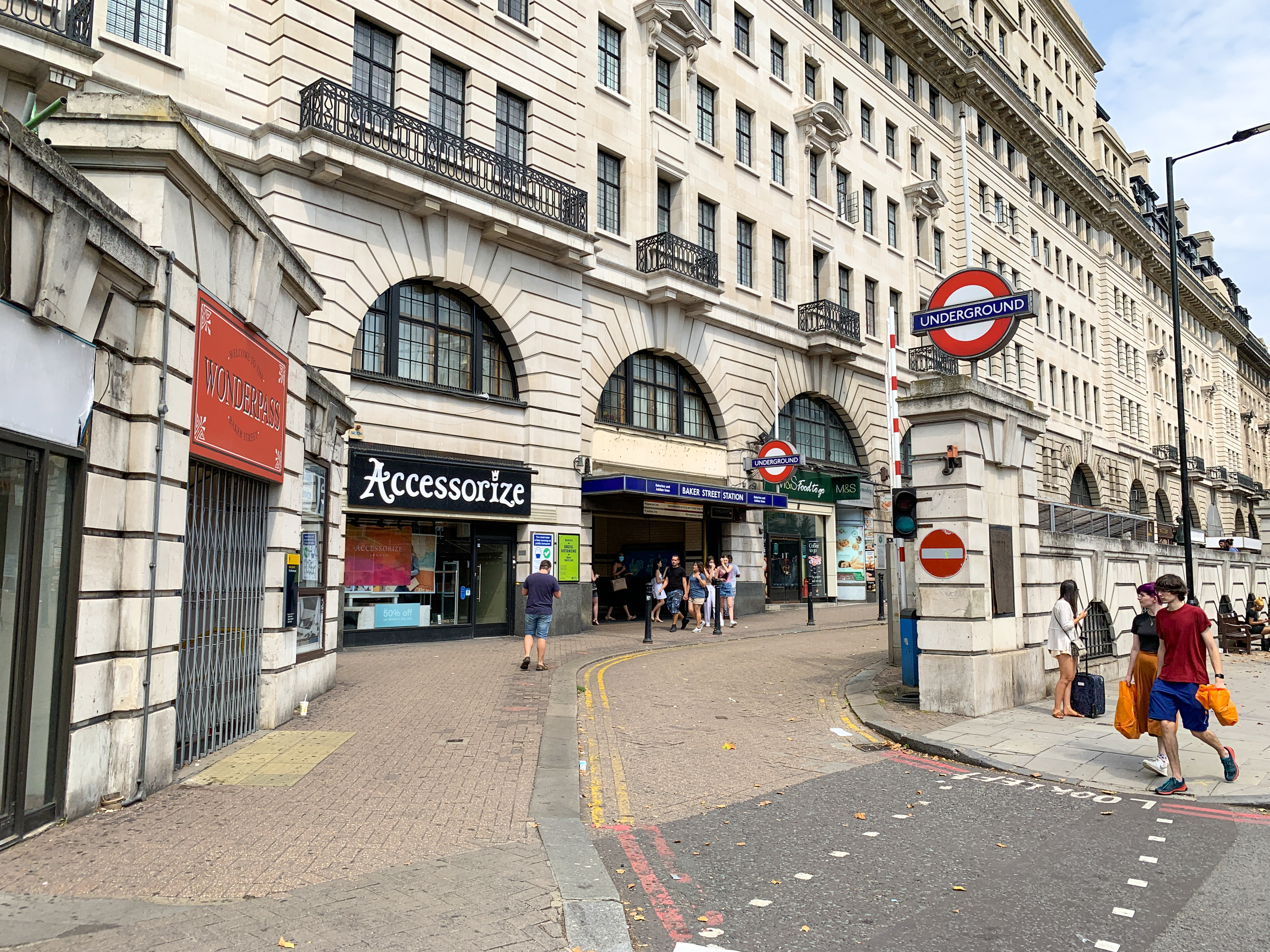
- Station entrance
- Interactive map of Baker Street

General information
- Location: Marylebone
- Local authority: City of Westminster
- Managed by: London Underground
- Number of platforms: 10
- Fare zone: 1
- OSI: Marylebone

London Underground annual entry and exit
- 2021: ▲11.15 million
- 2022: ▲20.52 million
- 2023: ▲21.21 million
- 2024: ▲21.96 million
- 2025: ▲22.39 million

Key dates
- January 10, 1863: Opened (MR)
- April 1868: Opened (MR platforms to north)
- 10 March 1906: Opened (BS&WR, as terminus)
- 27 March 1907: Extended (BSWR – Marylebone)
- 20 November 1939: Started (Bakerloo to Stanmore)
- 1961: Ended (Met to Aylesbury)
- 1 May 1979: Ended (Bakerloo to Stanmore)
- 1 May 1979: Started (Jubilee line)
- 30 July 1990: Ended (Met to H'smith/Barking)
- 30 July 1990: Started (Hammersmith & City)

Listed status
- Listing grade: II* (since 28 June 2010)
- Entry number: 1239815
- Added to list: 26 March 1987; 39 years ago

Other information
- External links: TfL station info page
- Coordinates: 51.522°N 0.157°W

Baker Street is a London Underground station, located at the junction of Baker Street and Marylebone Road in the City of Westminster. It is one of the original stations of the Metropolitan Railway (MR), the world's first underground railway, opened on 10 January 1863.

The station is in London fare zone 1 and is served by five lines. On the Circle and Hammersmith & City lines the station is between Edgware Road and Great Portland Street stations, and on the Metropolitan line it is between Finchley Road and Great Portland Street stations. On the Bakerloo line the station is between Marylebone and Regent's Park stations, and on the Jubilee line it is between St John's Wood and Bond Street stations.

Entrances to the station are in Chiltern Court, designed by Metropolitan Railway architect Charles Walter Clark.

== Location ==
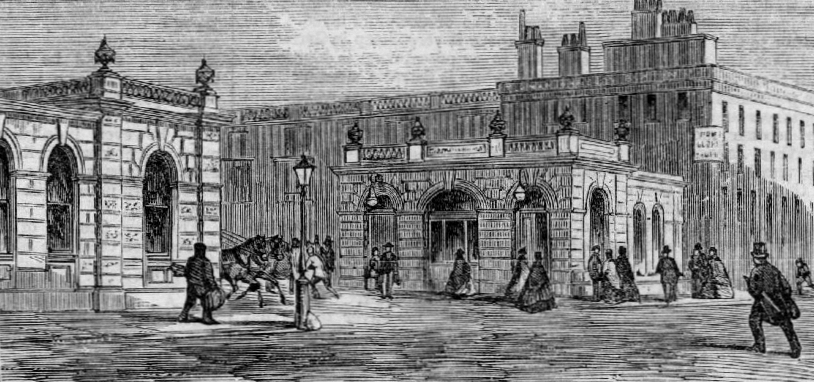
The original Baker Street station entrances on each side of Marylebone Road, 1862

The station has entrances on Baker Street, Chiltern Street (ticket holders only) and Marylebone Road.

A statue of Sherlock Holmes is outside the Marylebone Road entrance. Nearby attractions include Regent's Park, Lord's Cricket Ground, the Sherlock Holmes Museum, and Madame Tussauds.

== History ==
=== Metropolitan Railway – the world's first underground railway ===
In the first half of the 19th century, the population and physical extent of London grew greatly. (Note: In 1801, approximately one million people lived in the area that is now Greater London. By 1851 this had doubled. The increasing resident population and the development of a commuting population arriving by train each day led to a high level of traffic congestion with huge numbers of carts, cabs, and omnibuses filling the roads and up to 200,000 people entering the City of London, the commercial heart, each day on foot.) The congested streets and the distance to the city from the stations to the north and west prompted many attempts to get parliamentary approval to build new railway lines into the city. (Note: None were successful, and the 1846 Royal Commission on Metropolitan Railway Termini banned construction of new lines or stations in the built-up central area. The concept of an underground railway linking the City with the mainline termini was first proposed in the 1830s.) In 1852, Charles Pearson planned a railway from Farringdon to King's Cross. Although the plan was supported by the city, the railway companies were not interested and the company struggled to proceed. The Bayswater, Paddington, and Holborn Bridge Railway Company was established to connect the Great Western Railway's (GWR) Paddington station to Pearson's route at King's Cross. A bill was published in November 1852 and in January 1853 the directors held their first meeting and appointed John Fowler as its engineer. Several bills were submitted for a route between Paddington and Farringdon. The company's name was also to be changed again, to Metropolitan Railway (Note: The original established name was the "North Metropolitan Railway".) and the route was approved on 7 August 1854.

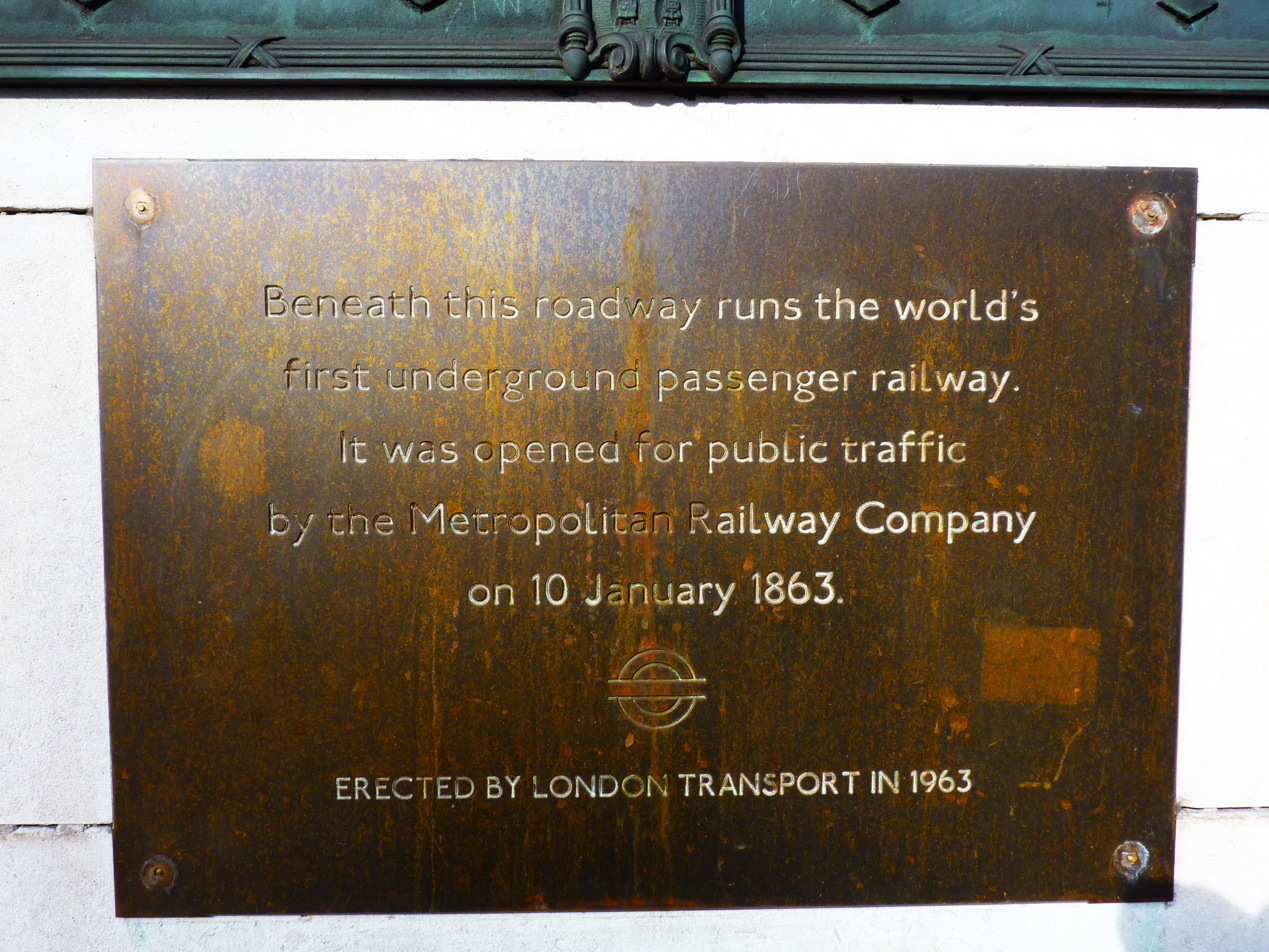
Sign on wall beside Marylebone Road beyond station entrance

Construction began in March 1860; using the "cut-and-cover" method to dig the tunnel. Despite several accidents during construction, work was complete by the end of 1862 at a cost of £1.3 million. Rail services through the station opened to the public on Saturday, 10 January 1863. (Note: The railway included a ceremonial run from Paddington and a large banquet for 600 shareholders and guests at Farringdon a day earlier. These platforms are now served by the Circle and Hammersmith & City lines.)

In the next few years, extensions of the line were made at both ends with connections from Paddington to the GWR's Hammersmith and City Railway (H&CR) and at Gloucester Road to the District Railway (DR). From 1871, the MR and the DR operated a joint Inner Circle service between Mansion House and Moorgate Street. (Note: After further extensions by the Metropolitan Railway to Liverpool Street (1875), Aldgate (1876) and Tower of London (1882), the Inner Circle was completed in 1884.)

==== North-western "branch" ====
In April 1868, the Metropolitan & St John's Wood Railway (M&SJWR) opened a single-track railway in tunnel to Swiss Cottage from new platforms at Baker Street East (which eventually become the present Metropolitan line platforms). The line was worked by the MR with a train every 20 minutes. A junction was built with the original route at Baker Street, but there were no through trains after 1869. (Note: The original intention of the M&SJWR was to run underground north-east to Hampstead Village, and indeed this appeared on some maps. This was not completed in full and the line was built in a north-western direction instead; a short heading of tunnel was built north of Swiss Cottage station in the direction of Hampstead. This is still visible today when travelling on a southbound Metropolitan line service.)

The M&SJWR branch was extended in 1879 to Willesden Green and, in 1880, to Neasden and Harrow-on-the-Hill. Two years later, the single-track tunnel between Baker Street and Swiss Cottage was duplicated and the M&SJWR was absorbed by the MR. (Note: Further extensions took the Metropolitan Railway to Pinner (1885), Rickmansworth (1887), Chesham (1889), Aylesbury (1892), Uxbridge (1904) and Watford (1925).)

=== Bakerloo and Jubilee lines ===
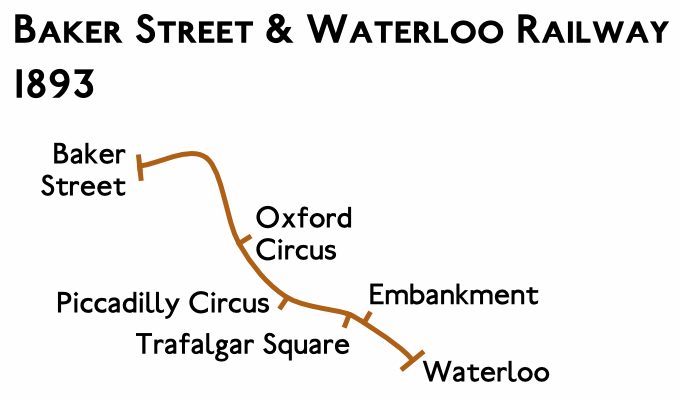
Route diagram which shows the original route of the Bakerloo line between Baker Street and Waterloo.

In November 1891, a private bill was presented to Parliament for the construction of the Baker Street and Waterloo Railway (BS&WR). The railway was planned to run entirely underground from Marylebone to Elephant & Castle via Baker Street and Waterloo and was approved in 1900. Construction commenced in August 1898 under the direction of Sir Benjamin Baker, W. R. Galbraith and R. F. Church with building work by Perry & Company of Tredegar Works, Bow. (Note: By November 1899, the northbound tunnel reached Trafalgar Square and work on some of the station sites was started, but the collapse of the L&GFC in 1900 led to works gradually coming to a halt. When the UERL was formed in April 1902, 50 per cent of the tunnelling and 25 per cent of the station work was completed. With funds in place, work restarted and proceeded at a rate of 73 feet (22.25 m) per week,. By February 1904, most of the tunnels and underground parts of the stations between Elephant & Castle and Marylebone were complete and works on the station buildings were in progress. The additional stations were incorporated as work continued elsewhere.) Test trains began running in 1905. The official opening of the BS&WR by Sir Edwin Cornwall took place on 10 March 1906. The first section of the BS&WR was between Baker Street and Lambeth North. Baker Street was the temporary northern terminus of the line until it was extended to Marylebone on 27 March 1907, a year after the rest of the line. The BS&WR's station building designed by Leslie Green stood on Baker Street and served the tube platforms with lifts, but these were supplemented with escalators in 1914, linking the Metropolitan line and the Bakerloo line platforms by a new concourse excavated under the Metropolitan line. An elaborately decorated restaurant and tea-room was added above Green's terminal building, the Chiltern Court Restaurant, which was opened in 1913.

On 1 July 1933, the MR and BS&WR amalgamated with other Underground railways, tramway companies and bus operators to form the London Passenger Transport Board (LPTB), and the MR became the Metropolitan line, while the BS&WR became the Bakerloo line of London Transport. However, there was a bottleneck on the Metropolitan line at Finchley Road where four tracks merge into two to Baker Street. LPTB decided to extend the Bakerloo line from Baker Street as a branch line, taking over the existing section between Finchley Road and Stanmore. (Note: In 1929, construction of a spur line from Wembley Park to Stanmore began. It opened on 10 December 1932.) Construction began in April 1936. On 20 November 1939, following the construction of an additional southbound platform and connecting tube tunnels between Baker Street and Finchley Road stations, the Bakerloo line took over the Metropolitan line's stopping services between Finchley Road and Wembley Park and its Stanmore branch. The current Bakerloo ticket hall and escalators to the lower concourse were provided in conjunction with the new service.

After the Victoria line had been completed in the 1960s, the new Jubilee line was proposed which would take a route via Baker Street, Bond Street, Trafalgar Square, Strand, Fleet Street, Ludgate Circus and Cannon Street, then proceeding into southeast London. This new line was to have been called the Fleet line. The Jubilee line added an extra northbound platform and took over the Bakerloo line service between Stanmore and Baker Street, opening on 1 May 1979.

=== Circle and Hammersmith & City lines ===
The initial route on the Hammersmith & City line was formed by the H&CR, running between Hammersmith and Moorgate. Services were eventually extended to Barking via the DR and shared with the existing MR tracks between Baker Street and Liverpool Street. The route between Hammersmith and Barking was shown on the tube map as part of the Metropolitan line, but since 1990 has been shown separately, the Metropolitan line becoming the route from Aldgate to Baker Street and northwards through "Metro-Land" to Uxbridge, Watford and Amersham.

The circle line was initially formed by the combination of the MR and DR routes, which were between Edgware Road and South Kensington, Edgware Road and Aldgate via King's Cross St Pancras, South Kensington and Mansion House, and a joint railway between Mansion House and Aldgate. Since 1949, the Circle line is shown separately on the map.

=== Incidents ===
On 18 June 1925, electric locomotive No.4 collided with a passenger train when a signal was changed from green to red just as the locomotive was passing it. Six people were injured.

On 23 August 1973, a bomb was found in a carrier bag in the ticket hall. The bomb was defused by the bomb squad. A week later, on 30 August, a member of staff found another bomb left on the overbridge. Again, it was defused without any injury.

== The station today ==
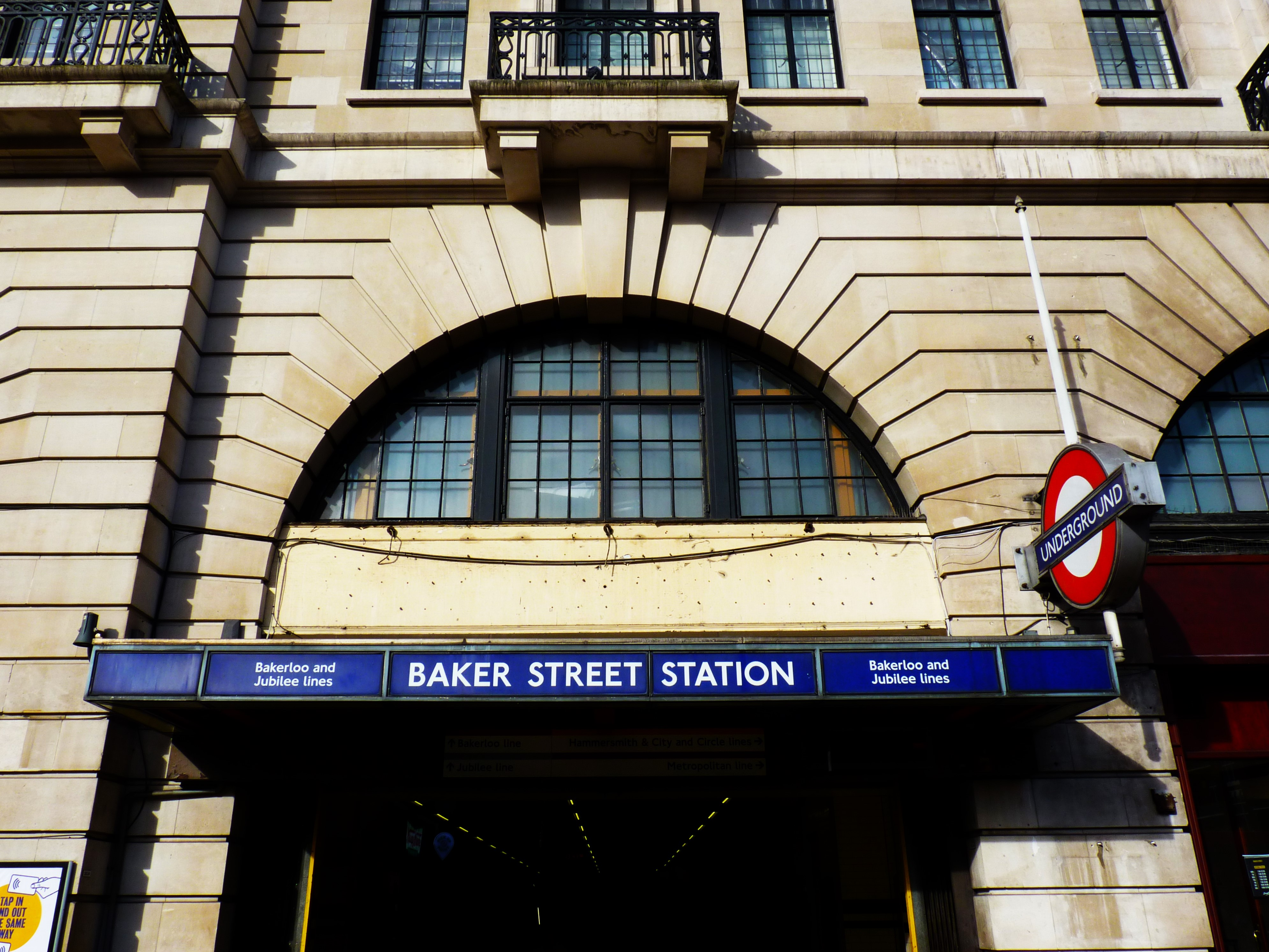
Station entrance for the Bakerloo and Jubilee lines on Marylebone Road

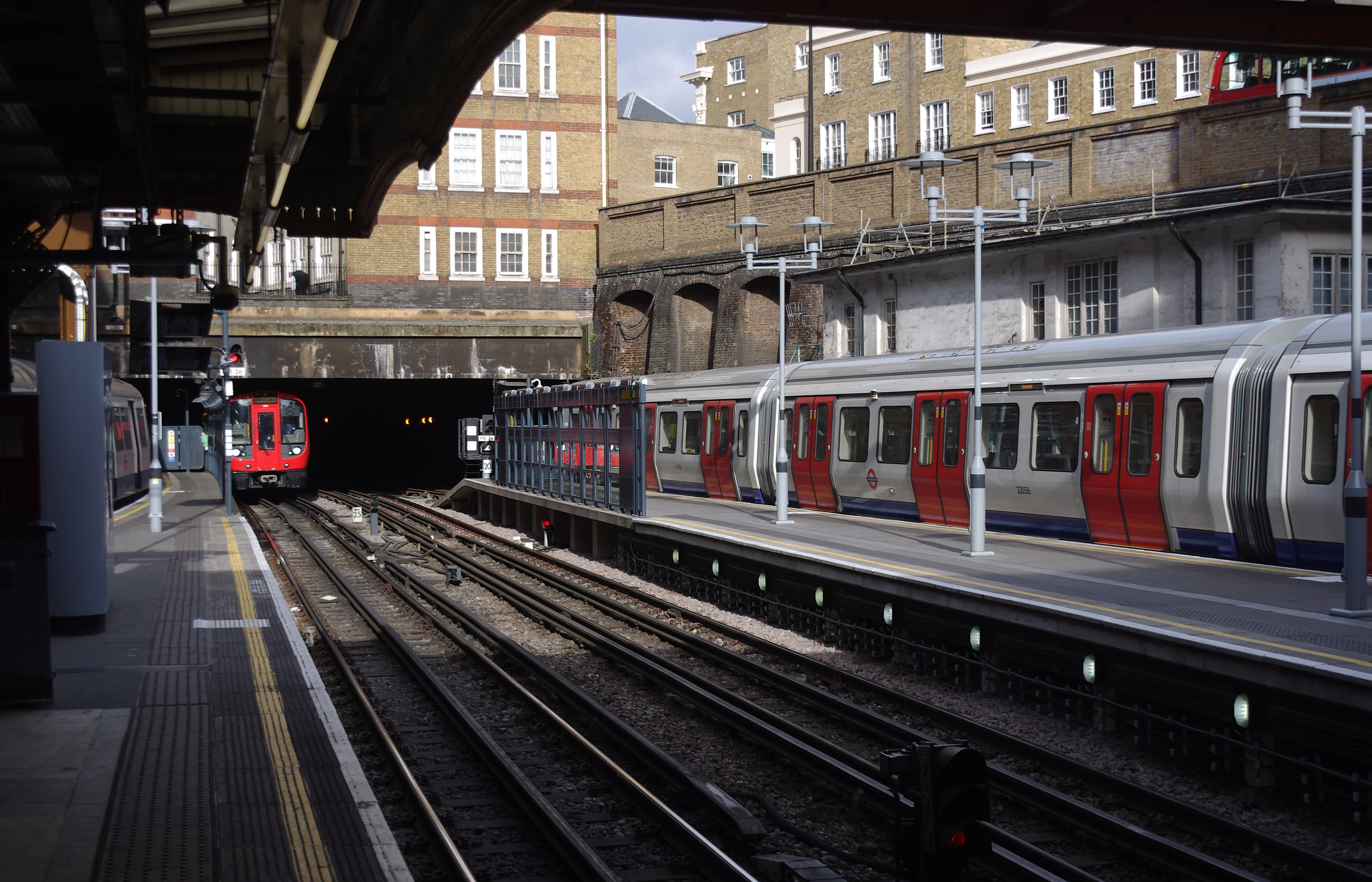
Metropolitan line platforms at the station

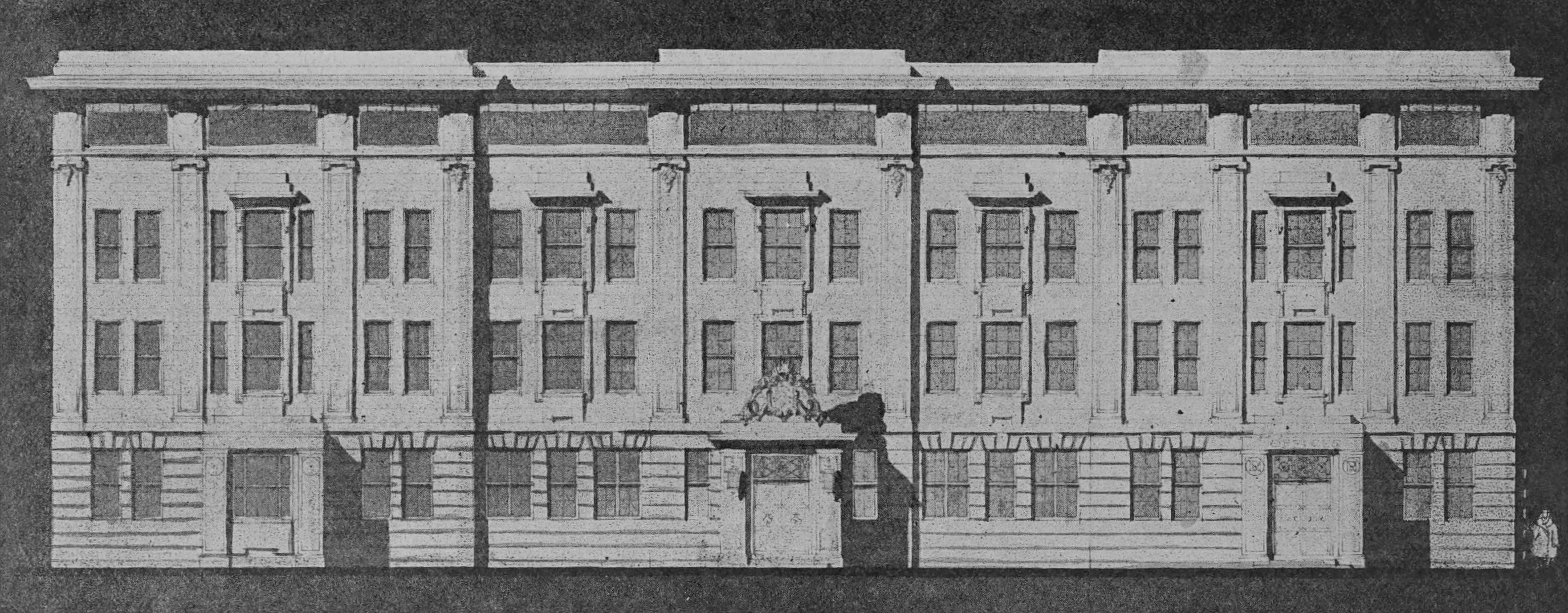
Metropolitan Railway offices within the station complex, designed by Charles Walter Clark

Baker Street station is the combination of three separate stations, with several booking offices from different periods. There were major changes in 1891–1893 and 1910–1912. The earliest part are the two platforms now used by the Circle and Hammersmith & City lines which are situated on a roughly east-to-west alignment beneath Marylebone Road, spanning approximately the stretch between Upper Baker Street and Allsop Place. This was part of the original Metropolitan Railway from Bishop's Road (now Paddington (Circle and Hammersmith & City lines) station to Farringdon Street (now Farringdon) which opened on 10 January 1863.

The platforms serving the main branch of the Metropolitan line towards Harrow and beyond are located within the triangle formed by Marylebone Road, Upper Baker Street and Allsop Place, following the alignment of Allsop Place. This station was the second section which was opened on 13 April 1868 by the Metropolitan & St. John's Wood Railway. This was later absorbed by the Metropolitan Railway and is usually known by the Metropolitan as Baker Street East station.

The third and final section is the deep-level tube station of the Baker Street & Waterloo Railway (now part of the Bakerloo line), situated at a lower level beneath the site of Baker Street East, opened on 10 March 1906. This part of the station now contains four platforms, two each for the Bakerloo and Jubilee lines.

This station is a terminus for some Metropolitan line trains, but there is also a connecting curve that joins to the Circle line just beyond the platforms, allowing Metropolitan line through services to run to Aldgate. The deep-level Bakerloo and Jubilee lines platforms are arranged in a cross-platform interchange layout and there are track connections between the two lines just to the north of the station. Access to the Bakerloo and Jubilee lines is only via escalators.

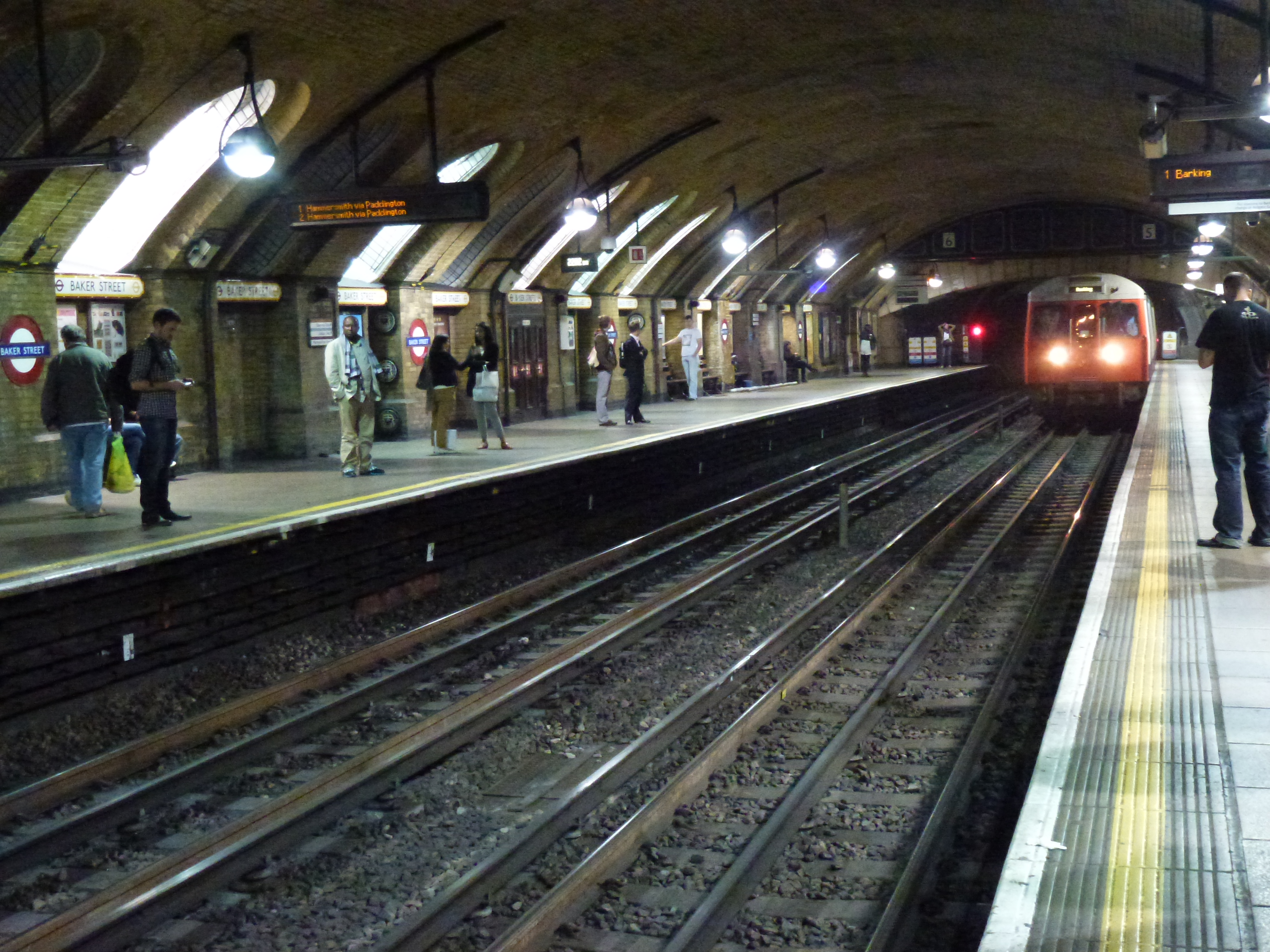
A Hammersmith and City line train to Barking arriving at the station’s oldest platforms opened in 1863

With ten platforms overall, Baker Street has the greatest number of London Underground platforms of any station on the network. Since Swiss Cottage and St John's Wood have replaced the former three stations between Finchley Road and Baker Street on the Metropolitan line, it takes an average of five and a half minutes to travel between them. Essentially, the Metropolitan Line operates as a fast service while the Jubilee Line offers local service between the two stations.

As part of the Transported by Design programme of activities, on 15 October 2015, after two months of public voting, Baker Street underground station's platforms were elected by Londoners as one of the 10 favourite transport design icons.

The former Chiltern Court Restaurant above the station is still in use today as the Metropolitan Bar, part of the Wetherspoons pub chain. The rest of the block, known as Chiltern Court and completed by the Metropolitan Railway's in-house architect, Charles Walter Clark in 1929, houses residential apartments.

=== Sub-surface platforms ===
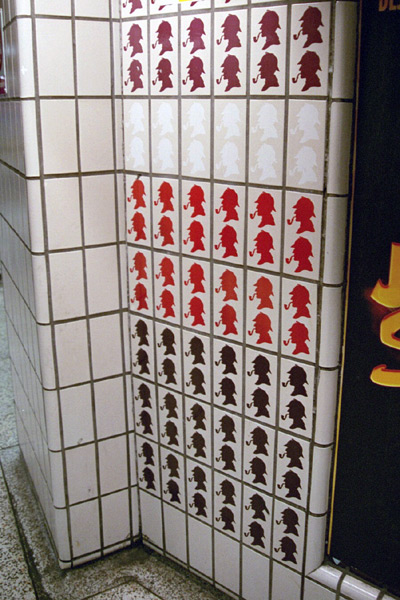
Unique tile-work in this station commemorates the fictional Sherlock Holmes's association with Baker Street

One of the MR's original stations, now the Circle and Hammersmith & City line platforms 5 and 6 are the best preserved dating from the station's opening in 1863. Plaques of the Metropolitan Railway's coat of arms along the platform and old plans and photographs depict the station which has changed remarkably little in over a hundred and fifty years. Restoration work in the 1980s on the oldest portions of Baker Street station brought it back to something similar to its 1863 appearance.

The Metropolitan line platforms 1 to 4 were largely the result of the station's rebuild in the 1920s to cater for the increase in traffic on its outer suburban routes. Today, the basic layout remains the same with platforms 2 and 3 being through tracks for City services to Aldgate from Amersham, Chesham, Uxbridge or Watford and vice versa flanked by terminal platforms 1 and 4 which are the domain of services from Baker Street to Amersham, Chesham, Uxbridge or Watford and vice versa. The northern end of the platforms is in a cutting being surrounded by Chiltern Court and Selbie House the latter of which houses Baker Street control centre responsible for signalling the Metropolitan line from Preston Road to Aldgate, as well as the Circle and Hammersmith & City lines between Baker Street and Aldgate. The southern end of the platforms are situated in a cut and cover tunnel which runs towards Great Portland Street. All Metropolitan line platforms can function as terminating tracks, although under normal circumstance only dead ended platforms 1 and 4 are used as such.

=== Deep-level tube platforms ===
The Bakerloo line uses platforms 8 and 9, which date from 10 March 1906 when the Baker Street & Waterloo railway opened between here and Lambeth North (then called Kennington Road). The contraction of the name to "Bakerloo" rapidly caught on, and the official name was changed to match in July 1906.

By the mid-1930s, the Metropolitan line was suffering from congestion caused by the limited capacity of its tracks between Baker Street and Finchley Road stations. To relieve this pressure, the network-wide New Works Programme, 1935–1940 included the construction of new sections of tunnel between the Bakerloo line's platforms at Baker Street and Finchley Road and the replacement of three Metropolitan line stations (Lord's, Marlborough Road and Swiss Cottage) between those points with two new Bakerloo line stations (St John's Wood and Swiss Cottage). The Bakerloo line also took over the Metropolitan line's service to Stanmore on 20 November 1939. The branch remained part of the Bakerloo line until 1 May 1979, when similar congestion problems for the Bakerloo line caused by the two branches converging at Baker Street led to the opening of the Jubilee line, initially created by connecting the Stanmore branch to new tunnels bored between Baker Street and Charing Cross. Following refurbishment in the 1980s the original tiling scheme was replaced with tiles depicting the silhouette of Sherlock Holmes, who lived at 221B Baker Street.

The Bakerloo line still maintains its connection with the now Jubilee line tracks to Stanmore, with tunnels linking from Bakerloo line northbound platform 9 to Jubilee line northbound platform 10 towards St John's Wood and from Jubilee line southbound platform 7 to Bakerloo line southbound platform 8 towards Regent's Park. Although no passenger services operate over these sections they can be used for the transfer of engineering trains and were used to transfer Bakerloo line 1972 stock trains to and from Acton Works as part of a refurbishment programme.

The Jubilee line uses platforms 7 and 10. Platform 7 was already in use for southbound trains from the Stanmore branch, and platform 10 opened in 1979 when the newly built Jubilee line took over the existing Bakerloo line services to Stanmore running through new tunnels from Baker Street to Charing Cross to serve as a relief line to the Bakerloo, which by then was suffering from capacity issues. In 1999, the Jubilee line was extended from Green Park to Stratford, making the Jubilee line platforms at Charing Cross redundant after twenty years. The design of the Jubilee line platforms at Baker Street has changed little since being opened, with illustrations depicting famous scenes from Sherlock Holmes cases.

Cross-platform interchange is provided between the four platforms of both the Bakerloo and Jubilee lines in both directions.

=== Station improvements ===
==== Step-free access project ====
In 2008 TfL proposed a project to provide step-free access to the sub-surface platforms. The project was a TfL-funded Games-enabling project in its investment programme (and not a project specifically funded as a result of the success of the London 2012 Games bid). The project was included in the strategy on accessible transport published by the London 2012 Olympic Delivery Authority and the London Organising Committee of the Olympic and Paralympic Games.

Access to the Metropolitan line platforms 1–4 (serving trains to and from Finchley Road) would be provided by a bridge from the Bakerloo and Jubilee line ticket hall, with a lift from the bridge to each island platform. Through a passage from platforms 1–2, this would also give step-free access to platform 5 (Circle and Hammersmith & City line eastbound trains). Access to platform 6 (Circle and Hammersmith & City line westbound trains) would be provided by demolishing the triangular building outside the station, on the north side of Marylebone Road, and taking over the public pedestrian subway under Marylebone Road to provide a link between a lift up from platform 5 to the subway and a lift at the other end of the subway down to platform 6. The replacement for the triangular building would also act as an emergency exit for the station.

TfL applied for planning permission and listed building consent for providing access to platforms 5 and 6 on 1 October 2008, but the application was subsequently withdrawn. (The part of the proposed scheme to provide step-free access to platforms 1–4 is within TfL's permitted development rights, and so does not require planning permission.) TfL announced on 31 March 2009 that because of budgetary constraints the step-free scheme would be deferred.

==== Platform lengthening ====
In order to accommodate the new, longer S stock trains, which started operating Metropolitan line services in August 2010, platforms 1 and 4 have been extended. However, the Circle and Hammersmith & City line platforms 5 and 6 have not been extended to accommodate their new S7 Stock trains, due to the enclosed nature of the platforms. Instead, selective door operation is employed.

== Services ==
=== Bakerloo line ===
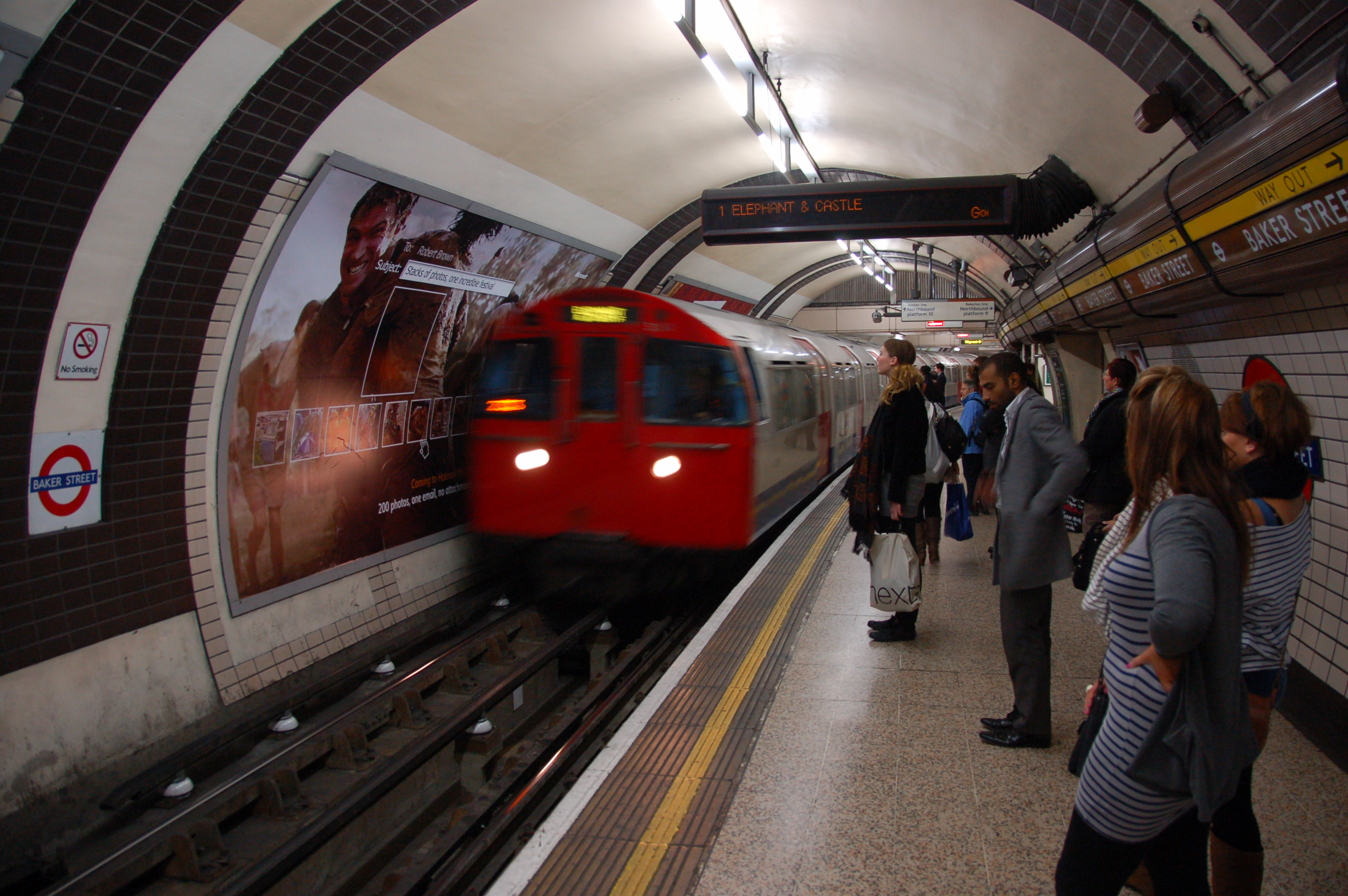
A Bakerloo line train to Elephant & Castle arriving at southbound platform 8

On the Bakerloo line, Baker Street station is between Marylebone to the north and Regent's Park to the south. Trains can terminate at Queen's Park, Stonebridge Park, or Harrow & Wealdstone to the north, and Piccadilly Circus, Lambeth North or Elephant & Castle to the south.

The typical service pattern in trains per hour (tph) operated during off-peak hours and Sundays is:

- 4 tph to Harrow & Wealdstone via Queen's Park and Stonebridge Park (Northbound)
- 4 tph to Stonebridge Park via Queen's Park (Northbound)
- 8 tph to Queen's Park (Northbound)
- 16 tph to Elephant & Castle (Southbound)

Weekday peak service operates with four additional Queen's Park-Elephant & Castle trains per hour, as does Saturday service.

=== Jubilee line ===
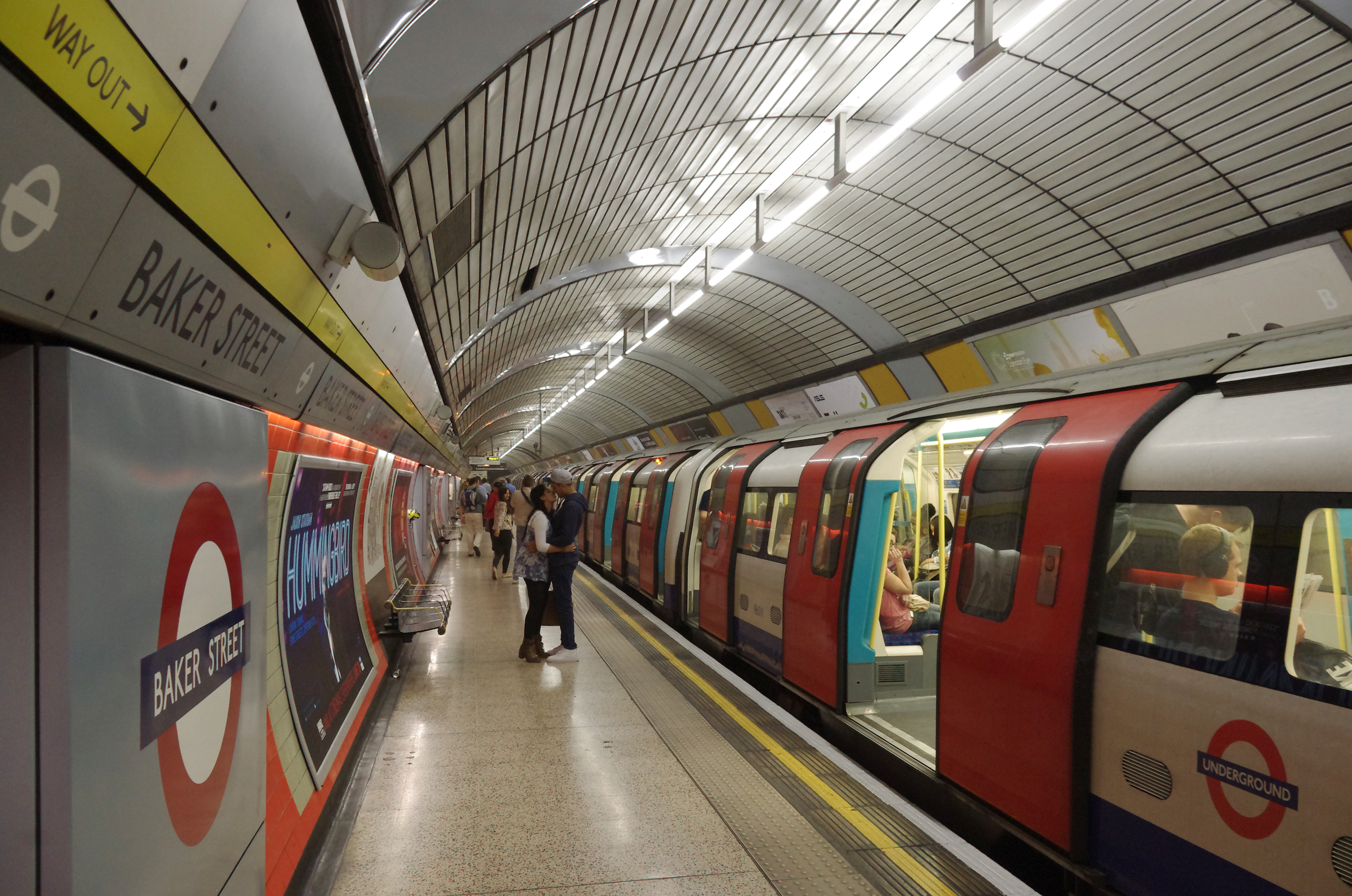
A Jubilee line train standing at northbound platform 10

On the Jubilee line, Baker Street station is between St John's Wood to the north and Bond Street to the south. Southbound trains usually terminate at Stratford and North Greenwich although additional turn back points are provided at Green Park, Waterloo, London Bridge, Canary Wharf and West Ham. Northbound trains usually terminate at Stanmore, Wembley Park and Willesden Green although additional turn back points are available at Finchley Road, West Hampstead and Neasden.

As of the May 2022 timetable the typical off-peak service in trains per hour (tph) is:

- 24 tph Southbound to Stratford
- 12 tph Northbound to Stanmore
- 4 tph Northbound to West Hampstead
- 4 tph Northbound to Wembley Park
- 4 tph Northbound to Willesden Green

The Night tube service (Friday night to Saturday morning & Saturday night to Sunday morning) in trains per hour is:

- 6 tph Southbound to Stratford
- 6 tph Northbound to Stanmore

=== Circle line ===
On the Circle line, the station is between Edgware Road to the west and Great Portland Street to the east, as well on the Hammersmith & City line.

The typical service in trains per hour is:

- 6tph Clockwise to Edgware Road via King's Cross St Pancras, Liverpool Street, Tower Hill and Victoria
- 6tph Anti-clockwise to Hammersmith via Paddington

=== Hammersmith & City line ===
Between 1 October 1877 and 31 December 1906 some services on the H&CR were extended to Richmond over the London and South Western Railway (L&SWR) via its station at Hammersmith (Grove Road). (Note: The L&SWR tracks to Richmond now form part of the London Underground's District line. Stations between Hammersmith and Richmond served by the MR were Ravenscourt Park, Turnham Green, Gunnersbury, and Kew Gardens.)

On the Hammersmith & City line, the station is between Edgware Road to the west and Great Portland Street to the east, as well on the Circle line.

The typical off-peak service in trains per hour (tph) is:

- 6 tph Eastbound to Barking or Plaistow
- 6 tph Westbound to Hammersmith

=== Metropolitan line ===
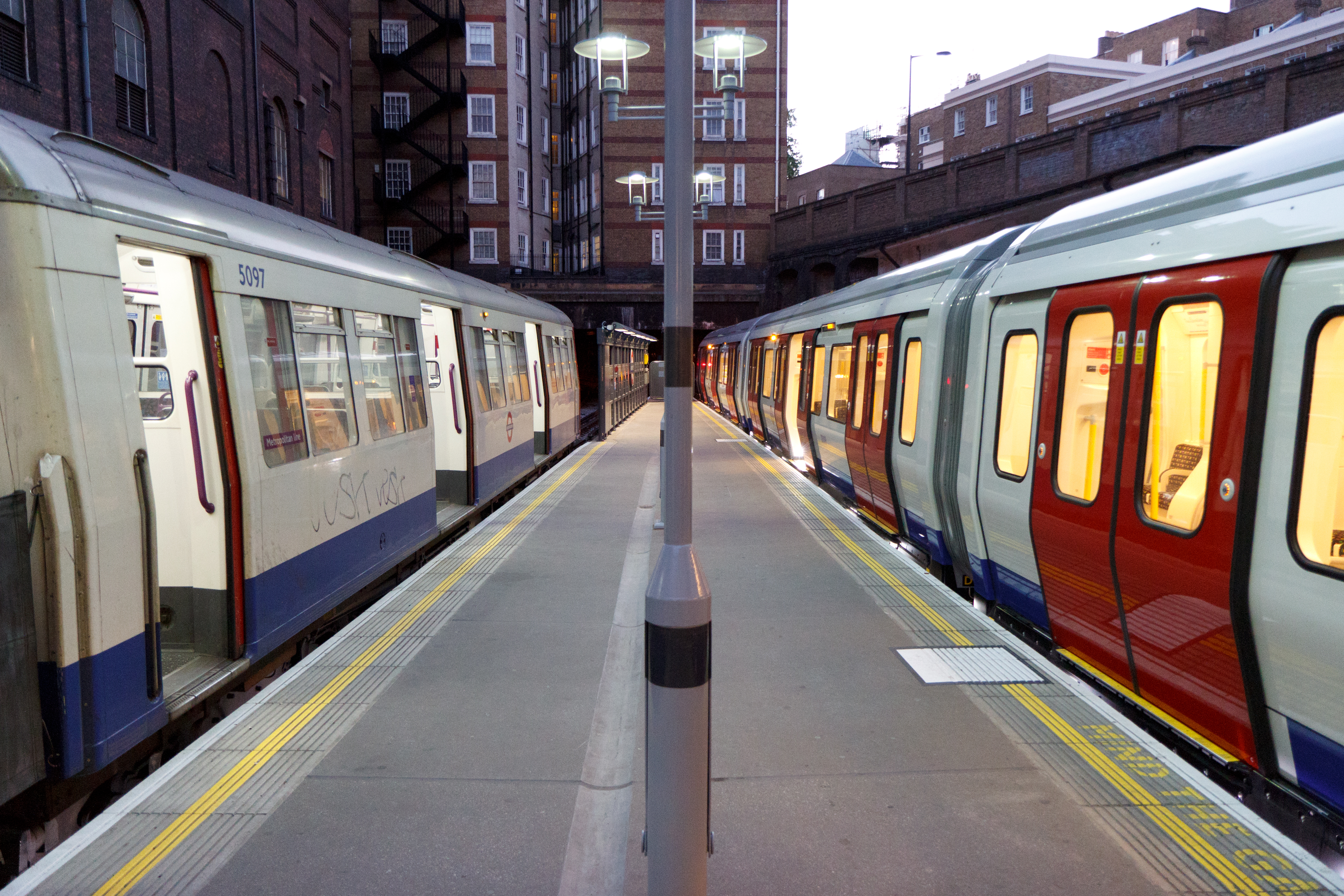
Old versus new: Previous A60 stock on the left and new S8 stock on the right

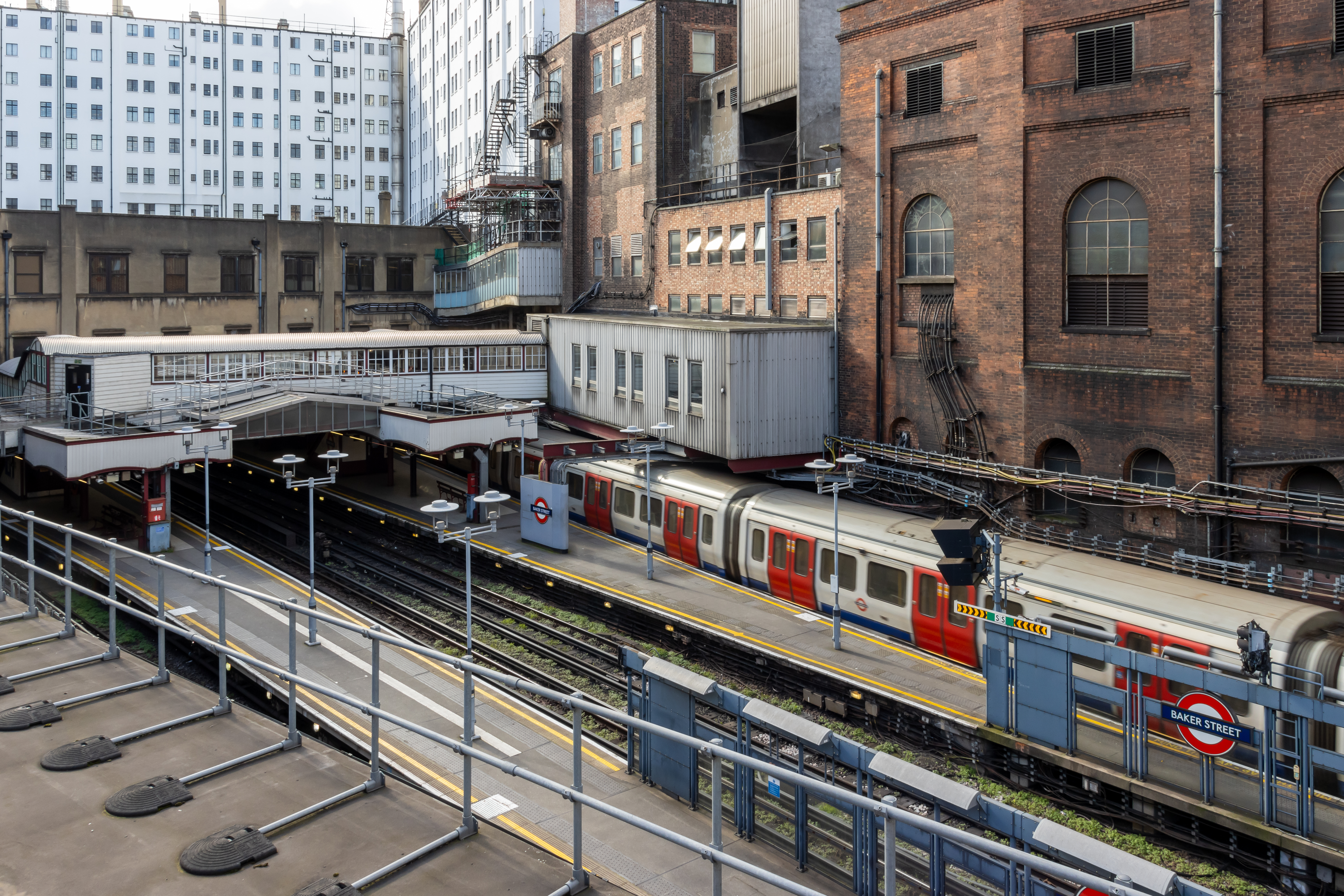
The Metropolitan line platforms viewed from above, with a train at northbound platform 1

The Metropolitan line is the only line in the network to operate an express service although currently this is mostly southbound in the morning peaks and northbound in the evening peaks. Southbound fast services run non-stop between Moor Park, Harrow-on-the-Hill and Finchley Road whilst semi-fast services run non stop between Harrow-on-the-Hill and Finchley Road. Northbound fast and semi-fast services call additionally at Wembley Park.

On this line, the station is between Finchley Road to the north and Great Portland Street to the south, sharing tracks with the Circle and Hammersmith & City lines from Great Portland Street. Southbound trains may terminate here and return north towards Amersham, Chesham, Uxbridge or Watford where terminal platforms 1 and 4 are used.

The off-peak service in trains per hour is:

- 12 tph Southbound to Aldgate
- 4 tph Southbound services terminate here
- 2 tph Northbound to Amersham (all stations)
- 2 tph Northbound to Chesham (all stations)
- 4 tph Northbound to Watford (all stations)
- 8 tph Northbound to Uxbridge (all stations)

Preceding station	London Underground	Following station
Marylebone towards Harrow & Wealdstone	Bakerloo line	Regent's Park towards Elephant & Castle
Edgware Road towards Hammersmith	Circle line	Great Portland Street towards Edgware Road via Aldgate
Edgware Road towards Hammersmith	Hammersmith & City line	Great Portland Street towards Barking
St John's Wood towards Stanmore	Jubilee line	Bond Street towards Stratford
Finchley Road towards Uxbridge, Amersham, Chesham or Watford	Metropolitan line	Great Portland Street towards Aldgate
Finchley Road towards Uxbridge, Amersham, Chesham or Watford	Metropolitan line	Terminus
Former services
Preceding station	London Underground	Following station
St John's Wood towards Stanmore	Bakerloo line Stanmore branch (1939–1979)	Regent's Park towards Elephant & Castle
Lord's towards Uxbridge, Aylesbury, Chesham or Watford	Metropolitan line (1868–1939)	Great Portland Street towards Aldgate
Lord's towards Uxbridge, Aylesbury, Chesham or Watford	Metropolitan line (1868–1939)	Terminus
Edgware Road towards Hammersmith	Metropolitan line Hammersmith branch (1864–1990)	Great Portland Street towards Barking

== Connections ==
The station is served by London Buses day and night routes.

== Points of interest ==
- Royal Academy of Music
- Madame Tussauds
- Sherlock Holmes Museum
- Statue of Sherlock Holmes, London

== In popular culture ==
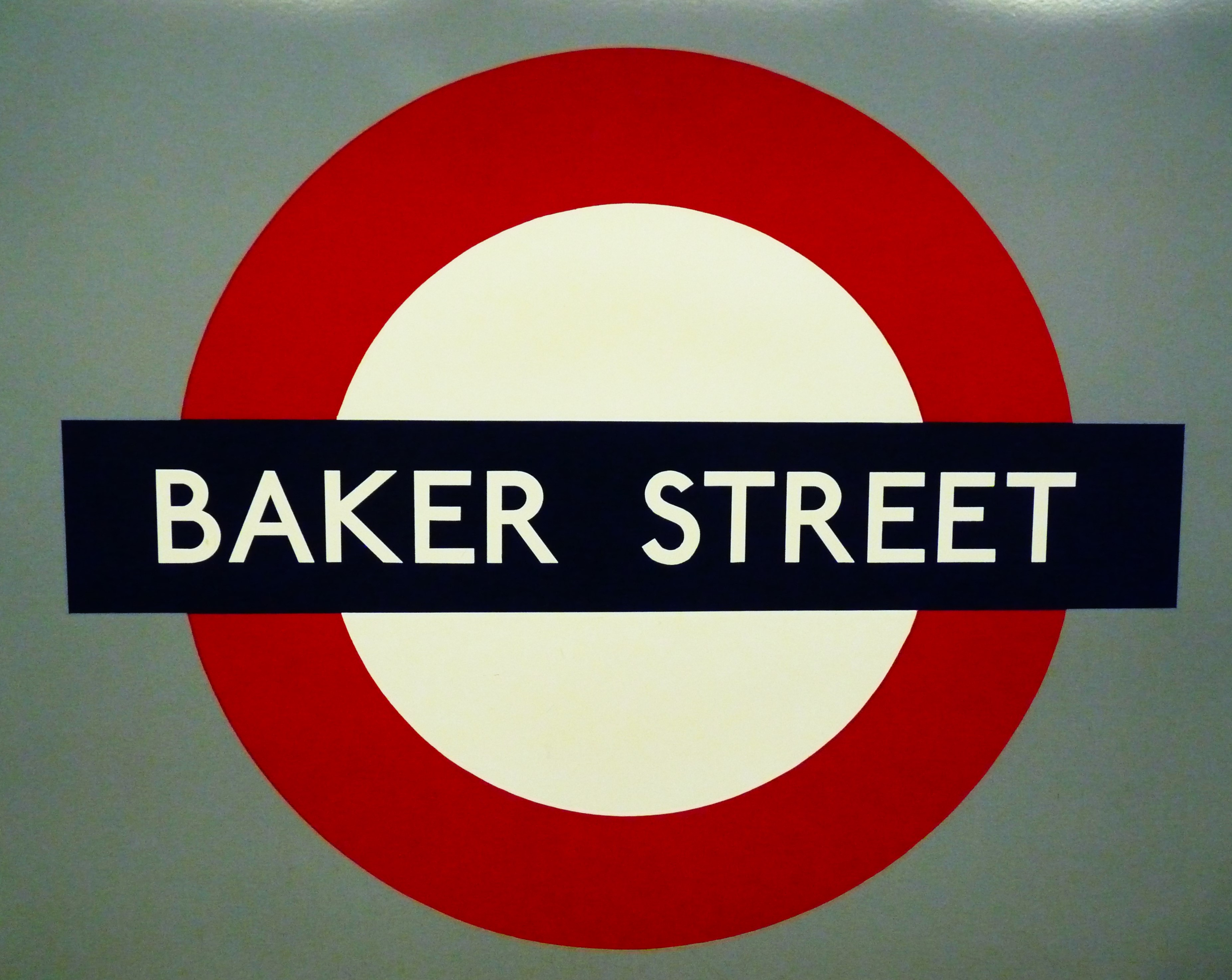
Baker Street station roundel

The Metropolitan Bar above Baker Street station is featured in Metro-Land, a 1973 documentary film by John Betjeman in which he reminiscences about its genteel origins as the Chiltern Court Restaurant, which formed part of the block, Chiltern Court, which Clark constructed above the station.

== See also ==
- Baker Street (song) by Gerry Rafferty
