= Regent's Park tube station =

London Underground station

Regent's Park
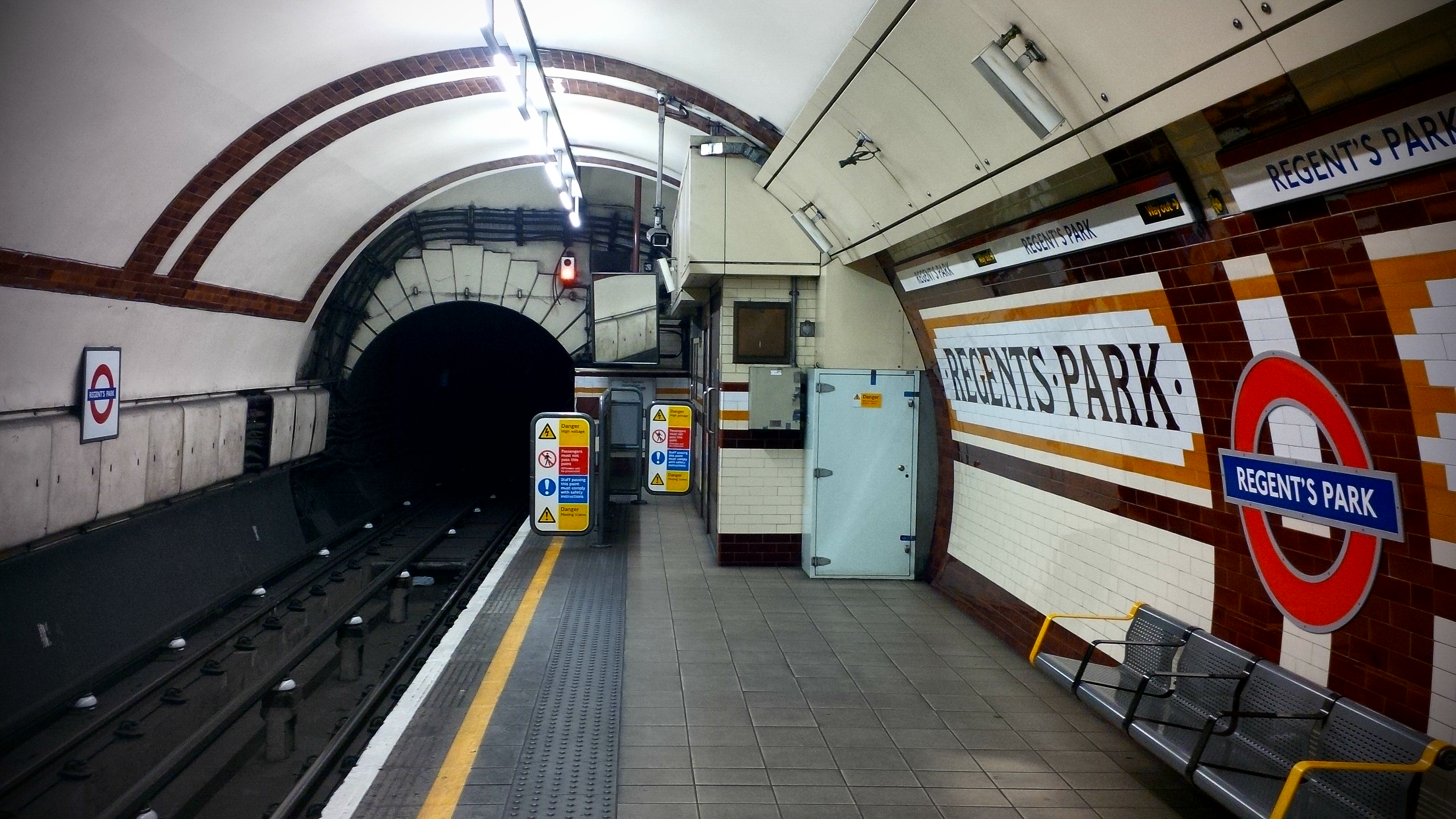
- Bakerloo line platform at the station
- Interactive map of Regent's Park

General information
- Location: Marylebone
- Local authority: City of Westminster
- Managed by: London Underground
- Number of platforms: 2
- Fare zone: 1

London Underground annual entry and exit
- 2021: ▼1.27 million
- 2022: ▲2.15 million
- 2023: ▲2.30 million
- 2024: ▼2.21 million
- 2025: ▼2.18 million

Railway companies
- Original company: Baker Street and Waterloo Railway

Key dates
- 10 March 1906: Station opened

Other information
- External links: TfL station info page
- Coordinates: 51.5235°N 0.1464°W

Regent's Park is a London Underground station. It is 175 metres (191 yd) south of Regent's Park. The station is on the Bakerloo line, between Baker Street and Oxford Circus stations. Its access is on Marylebone Road, within Park Crescent. It is the second-least used station in London fare zone 1, with 3.5 million entries or exits in 2015. It is situated 190 metres (210 yd) west of Great Portland Street tube station on the same arterial road.

== History ==
The station was opened on 10 March 1906 by the Baker Street and Waterloo Railway (BS&WR); in the original parliamentary authority for the construction of the BS&WR no station was allowed at Regent's Park. Permission was granted to add it to the already partially constructed line in 1904. In 1983, London Transport proposed to close the station on the basis that the passenger lifts, which at the time were 77 years old, needed to be replaced at a cost of more than £3 million. The proposal was dropped following a request by the GLC for the matter to be reconsidered.

== Station design ==
Construction of the station ticket hall involved digging a box-like void underneath the garden above. This caused significant subsidence, and is why the large metal beams in the ticket hall are present.

Unlike most of the BS&WR's other stations, Regent's Park has no surface buildings and is accessed from a subway. The station is served by lifts, and between 10 July 2006 and 14 June 2007 it was closed to allow essential refurbishment work on these and other parts of the station. There is also a staircase with 96 steps.

Great Portland Street station is within walking distance to the east for interchanges to the Circle, Hammersmith & City, and Metropolitan lines; however, out-of-station interchange fares do not apply and both journeys are charged separately.

== Points of interest ==
Nearby are Regent's Park itself, Madame Tussauds' museum, the Royal Academy of Music, the Royal College of Physicians, Holy Trinity Church, St. Marylebone Parish Church, Portland Place and Harley Street. The station is close by the former residences of H.G. Wells, Elizabeth Bowen, Ralph Vaughan Williams, Ernest Jones and Sir Charles Wheatstone, all of which are marked with blue plaques placed by the Greater London Council.

== Services ==
Regent's Park station is on the Bakerloo line in London fare zone 1. It is between Baker Street to the north and Oxford Circus to the south. The typical service pattern in trains per hour (tph) operated during off-peak hours weekdays and all day Sundays is:

- 4tph to Harrow & Wealdstone via Queen's Park and Stonebridge Park (Northbound)
- 4tph to Stonebridge Park via Queen's Park (Northbound)
- 8tph to Queen's Park (Northbound)
- 16tph to Elephant & Castle (Southbound)

Weekday peak service, as well as Saturday service, operates with four additional Queen's Park-Elephant & Castle trains per hour.

Preceding station	London Underground	Following station
Baker Street towards Harrow & Wealdstone	Bakerloo line	Oxford Circus towards Elephant & Castle

== Connections ==
The station is served by London Buses day and nighttime routes.

== Notes and references ==
Footnotes

Citations
