= Sherlock Holmes Museum =

Private museum in London

The Sherlock Holmes Museum
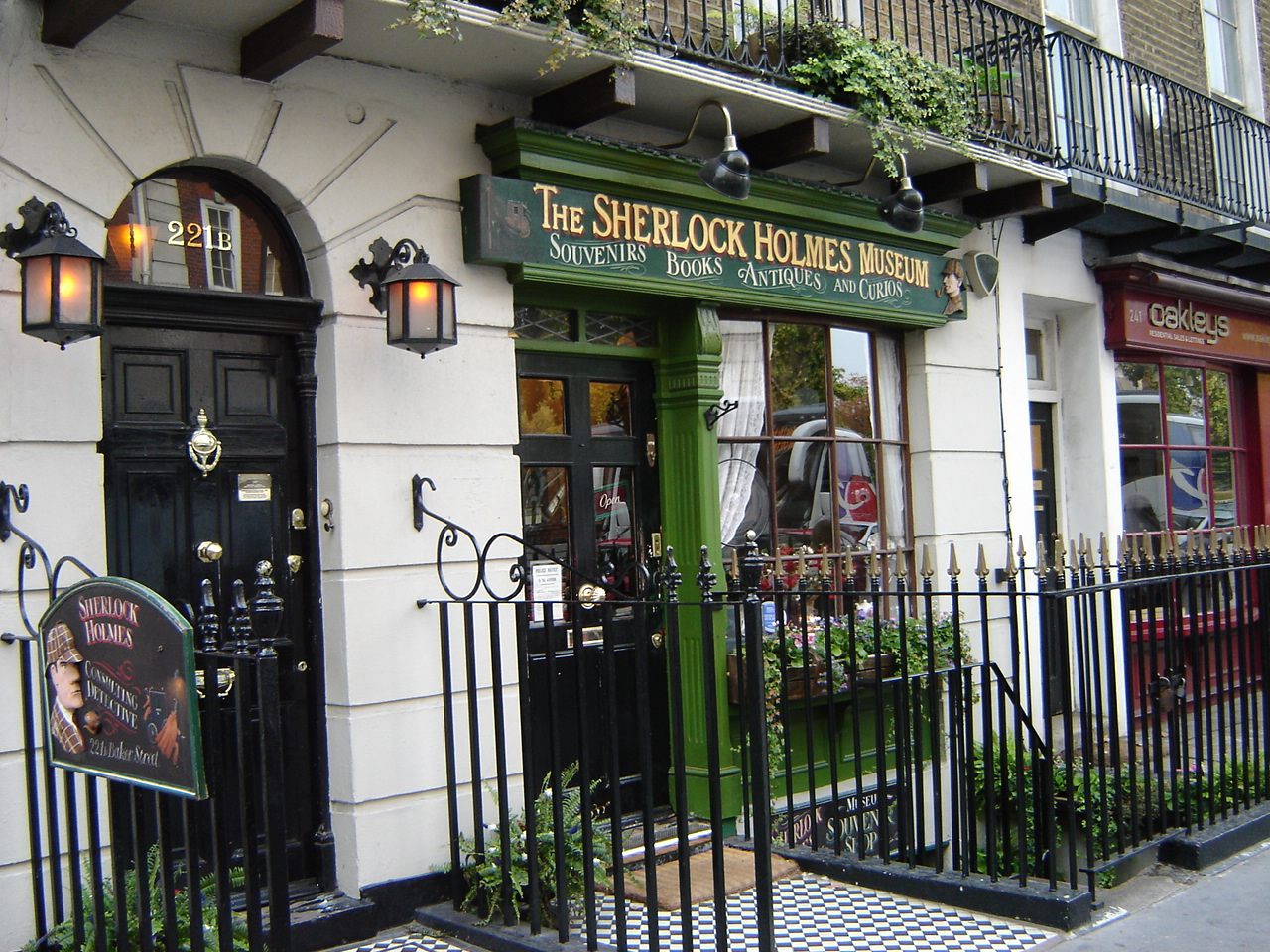
- The exterior of the Sherlock Holmes Museum and doorway marked as 221B

- Location within Central London
- Established: 1990; 36 years ago
- Location: Baker Street; London, NW1; United Kingdom
- Coordinates: 51.5237°N 0.1585°W
- Public transit access: Baker Street; Marylebone
- Website: www.sherlock-holmes.co.uk

The Sherlock Holmes Museum is a privately run museum in London, England, dedicated to the famous fictional detective Sherlock Holmes. It is the world's first museum dedicated to the literary character Sherlock Holmes. It opened in 1990 and is situated on Baker Street, bearing the number 221B by permission of the City of Westminster, although it lies between numbers 237 and 241, near the north end of Baker Street in central London close to Regent's Park.

The Georgian town house which the museum occupies as "221B Baker Street" was built in 1815. It was formerly used as a boarding house from 1860 to 1936. It covers the period of 1881 to 1904 when the stories describe Sherlock Holmes and Doctor Watson residing there as tenants of Mrs Hudson. The house is part of the terrace of 237-241 Baker Street which is listed Grade II on the National Heritage List for England. The museum features exhibits items from several different adaptations of Sherlock Holmes, and recreations of scenes from the 1984 Granada Television series Sherlock Holmes.

== Numbering dispute ==
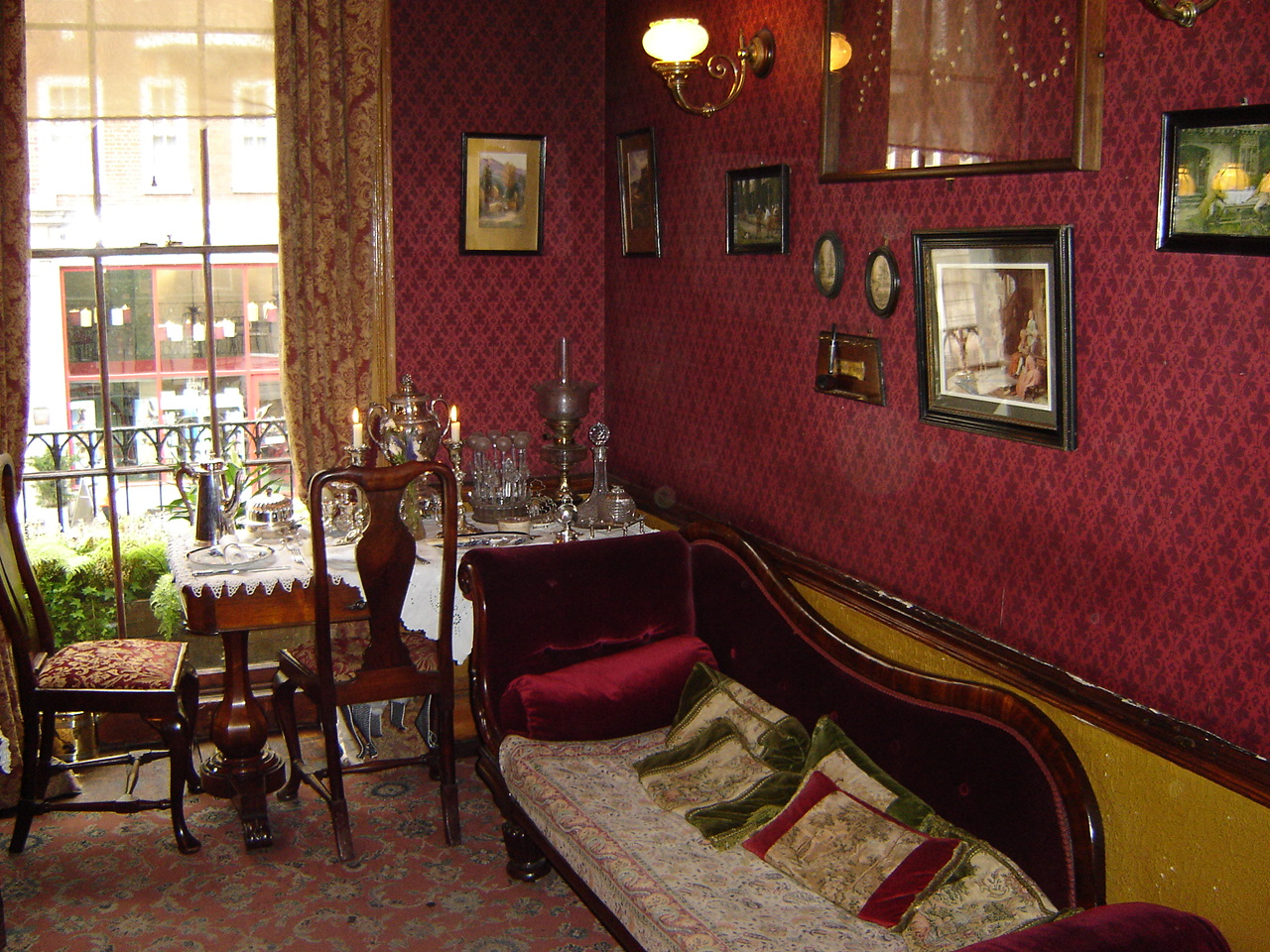
Sitting room on 1st floor of the museum

The address 221B was the subject of a protracted dispute between the museum and the nearby Abbey National building. Since the 1930s, the Royal Mail had been delivering mail addressed to Sherlock Holmes to the Abbey National Bank, and they had employed a special secretary to deal with such correspondence. The museum went through several appeals for such mail to be delivered to it, on the grounds that it was the most appropriate organisation to respond to the mail, rather than the bank, whose primary business was to lend money out on interest. Although these initiatives were all unsuccessful, the issue was finally resolved in 2002 when the Abbey National vacated its headquarters after seventy years, and the mail is currently delivered to the museum.

== Family objections ==
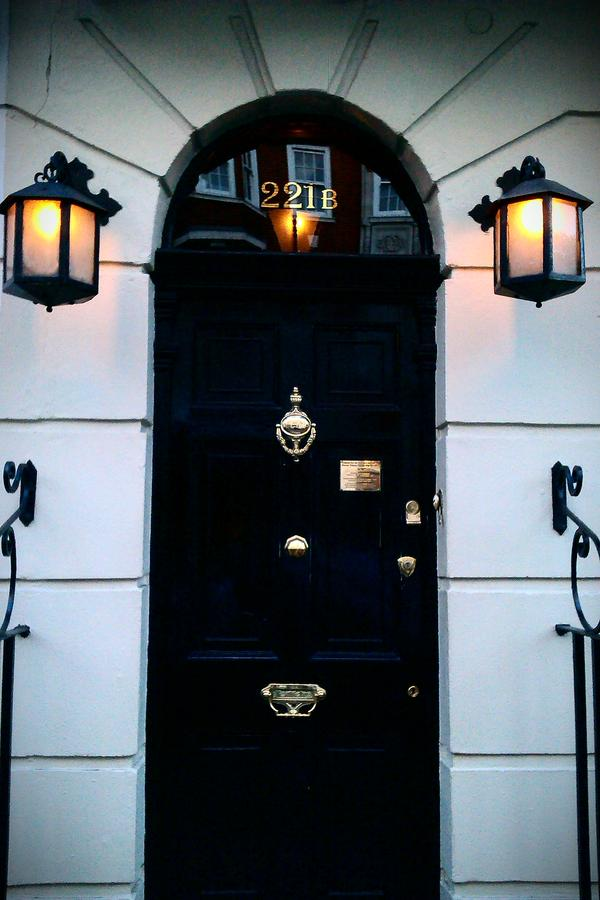
221 B front view

Jean Conan Doyle made clear her lack of enthusiasm for the museum when she was asked about it. She was very much against the idea of suggesting that her father's creation was a real person and knew that the presence of the museum would reinforce the idea in the minds of many that Holmes had really existed. This idea was strengthened further by the presence of a commemorative blue plaque on the outside that states the years of Holmes's supposed residency. However, Dame Jean Conan Doyle lent her support to the Sherlock Holmes Museum in Switzerland by attending its opening in 1991. Dame Jean was offered the opportunity to create a room in the London museum dedicated to her father, but this offer was refused, and since then the last remaining possessions of Sir Arthur Conan Doyle have been sold off at auction.

Interiors

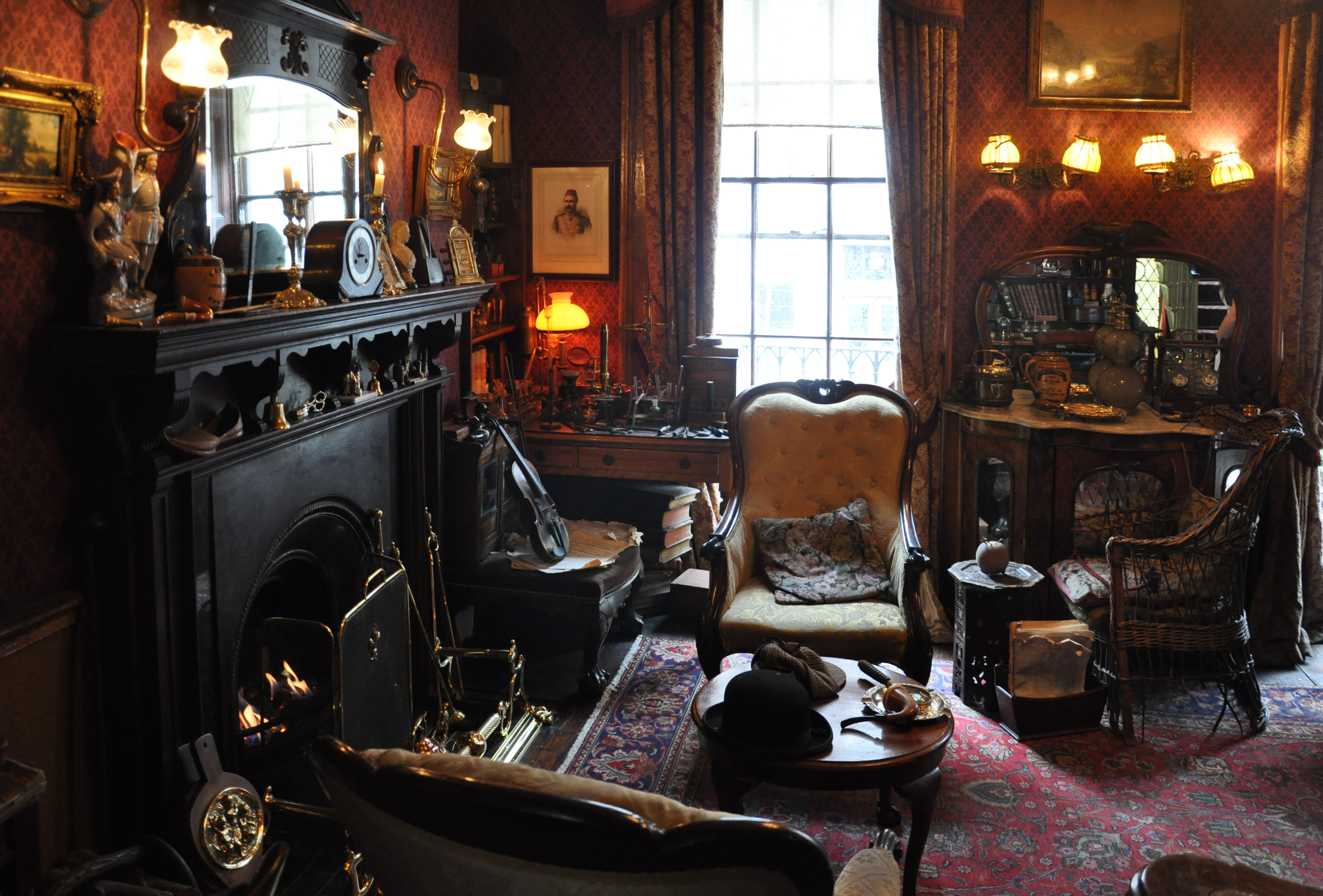
"Sitting Room"

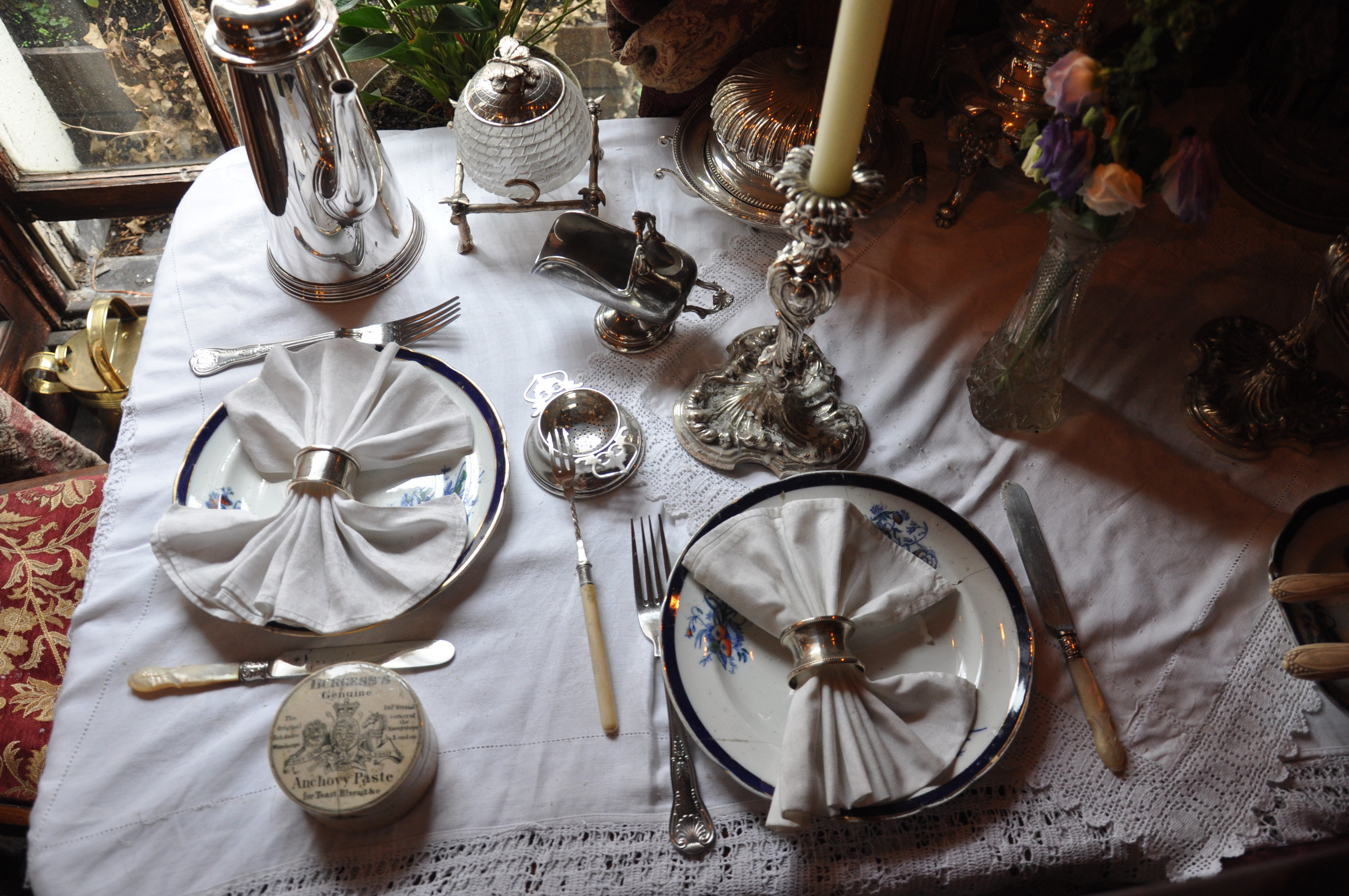
The table set in "Sherlock Holmes's Room"

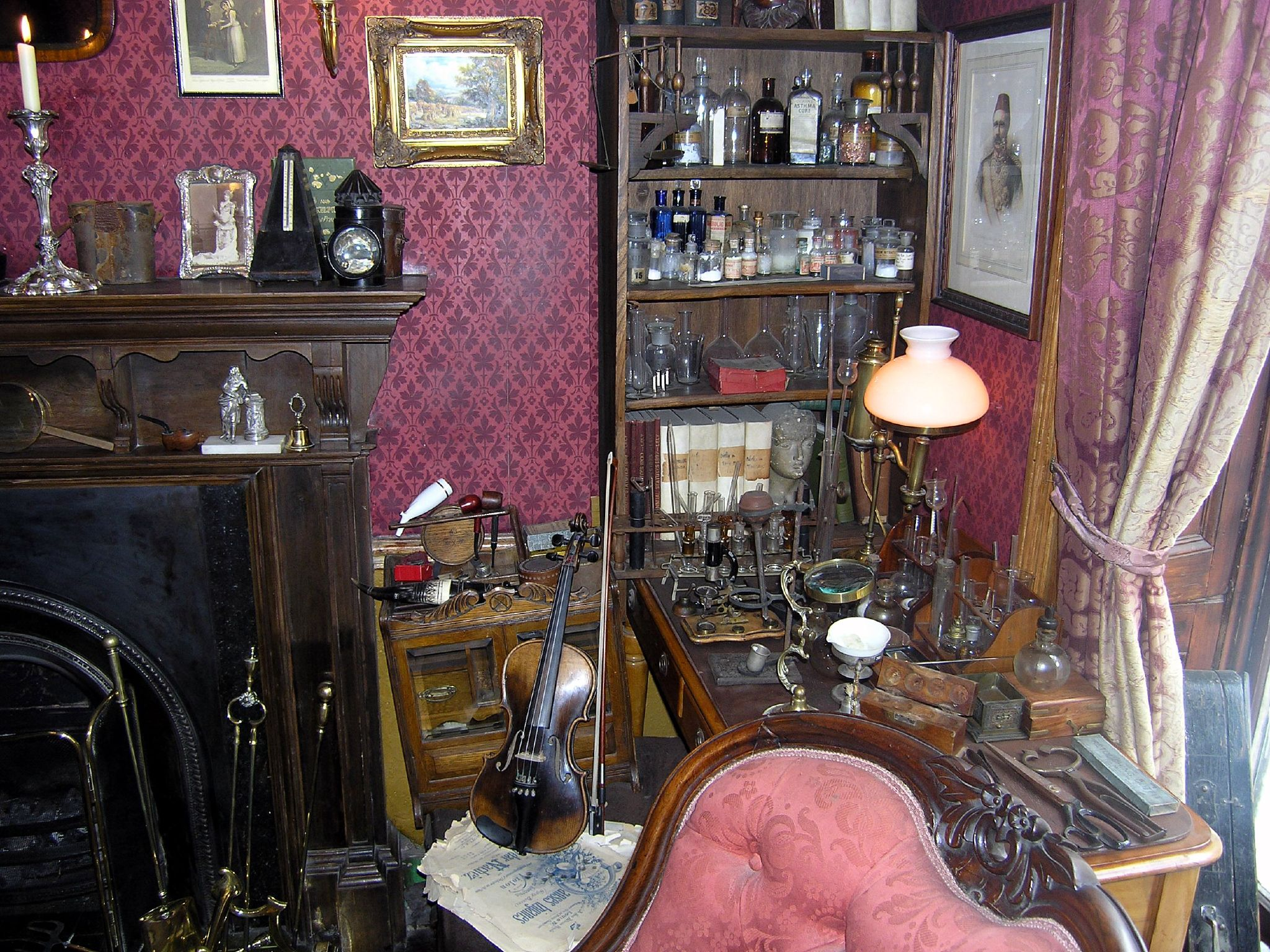
Sherlock's laboratory

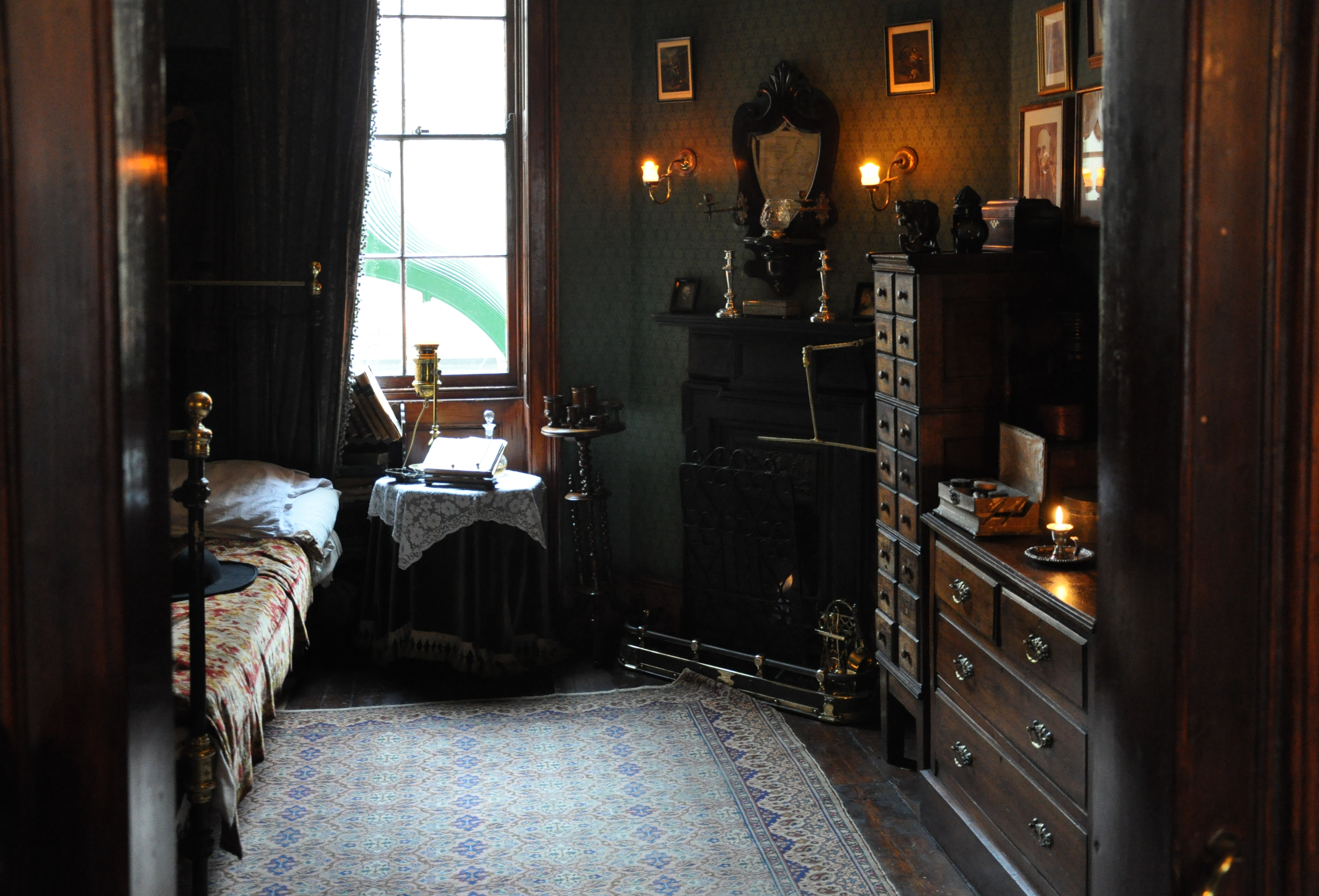
"Holmes' Bedroom"

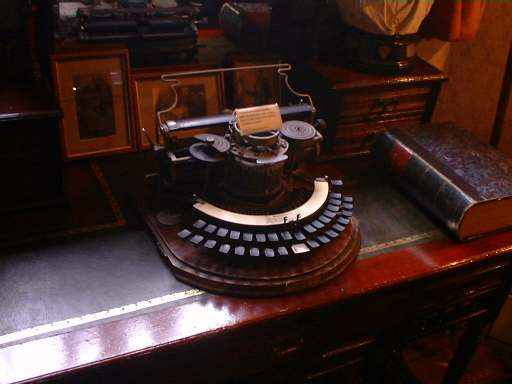
The typewriter at the end time of the 19th century

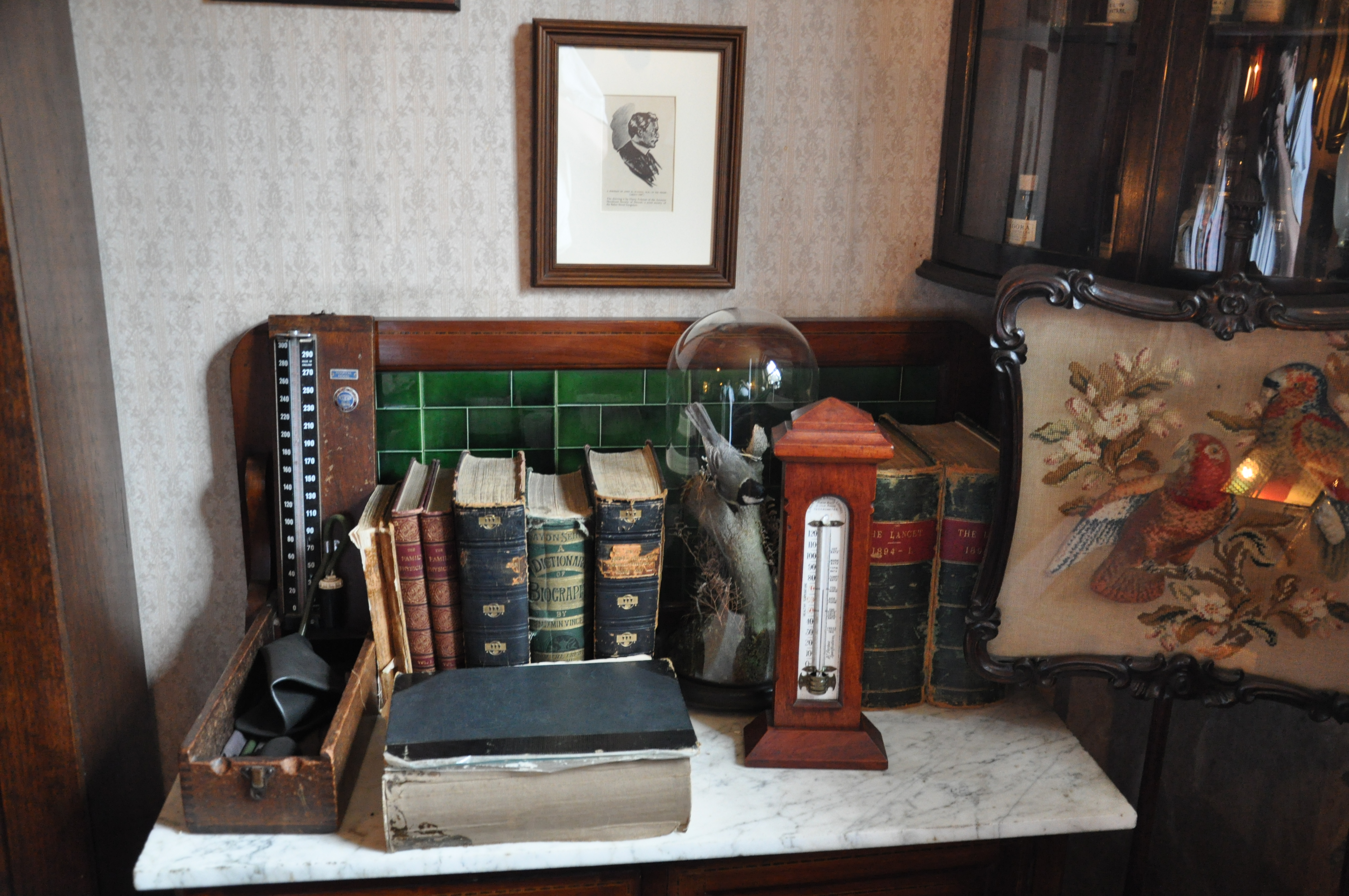
"Dr. Watson's Room", books

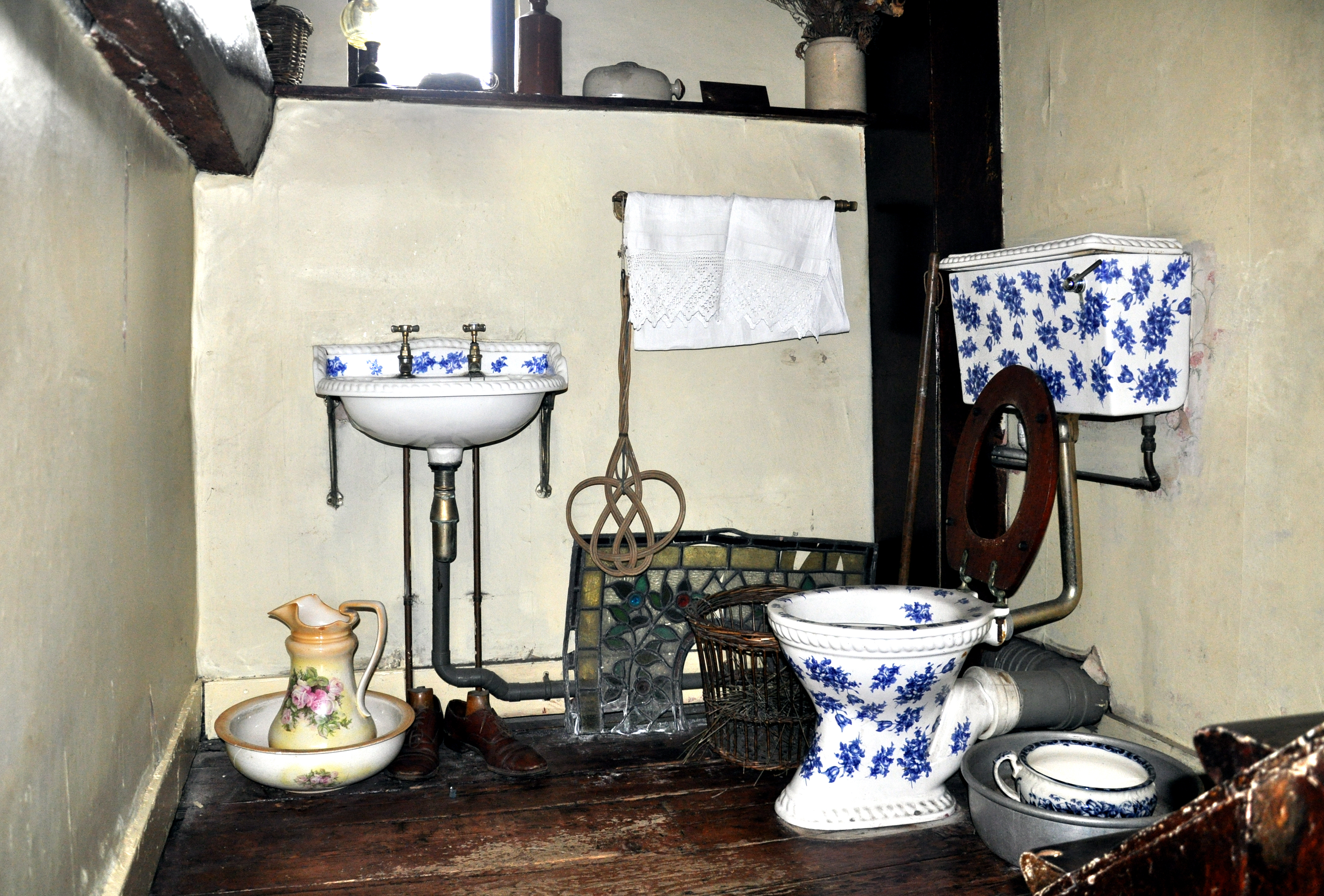
Bathroom

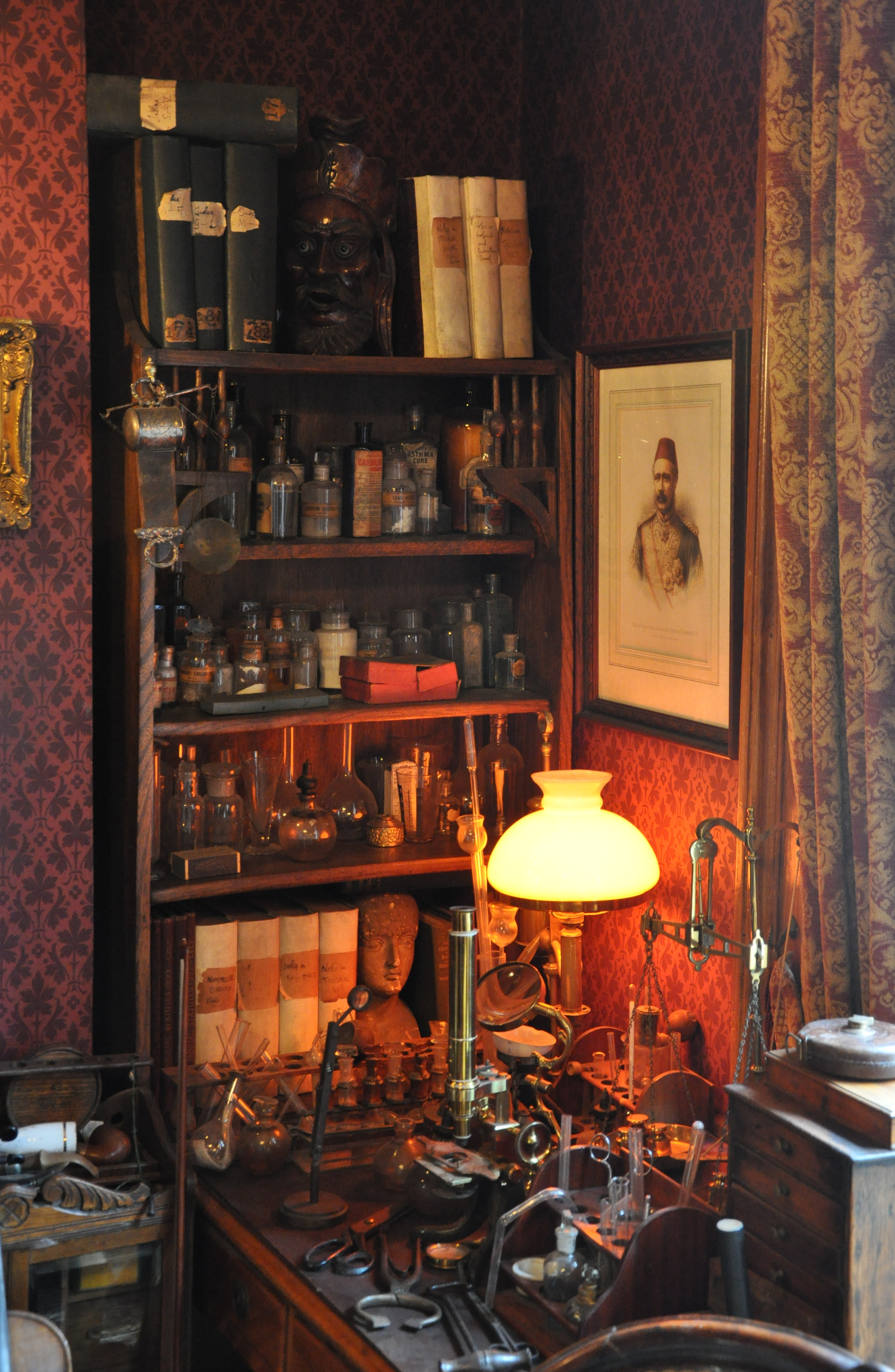
Sherlock Holmes Museum, Baker Street, "The Study"

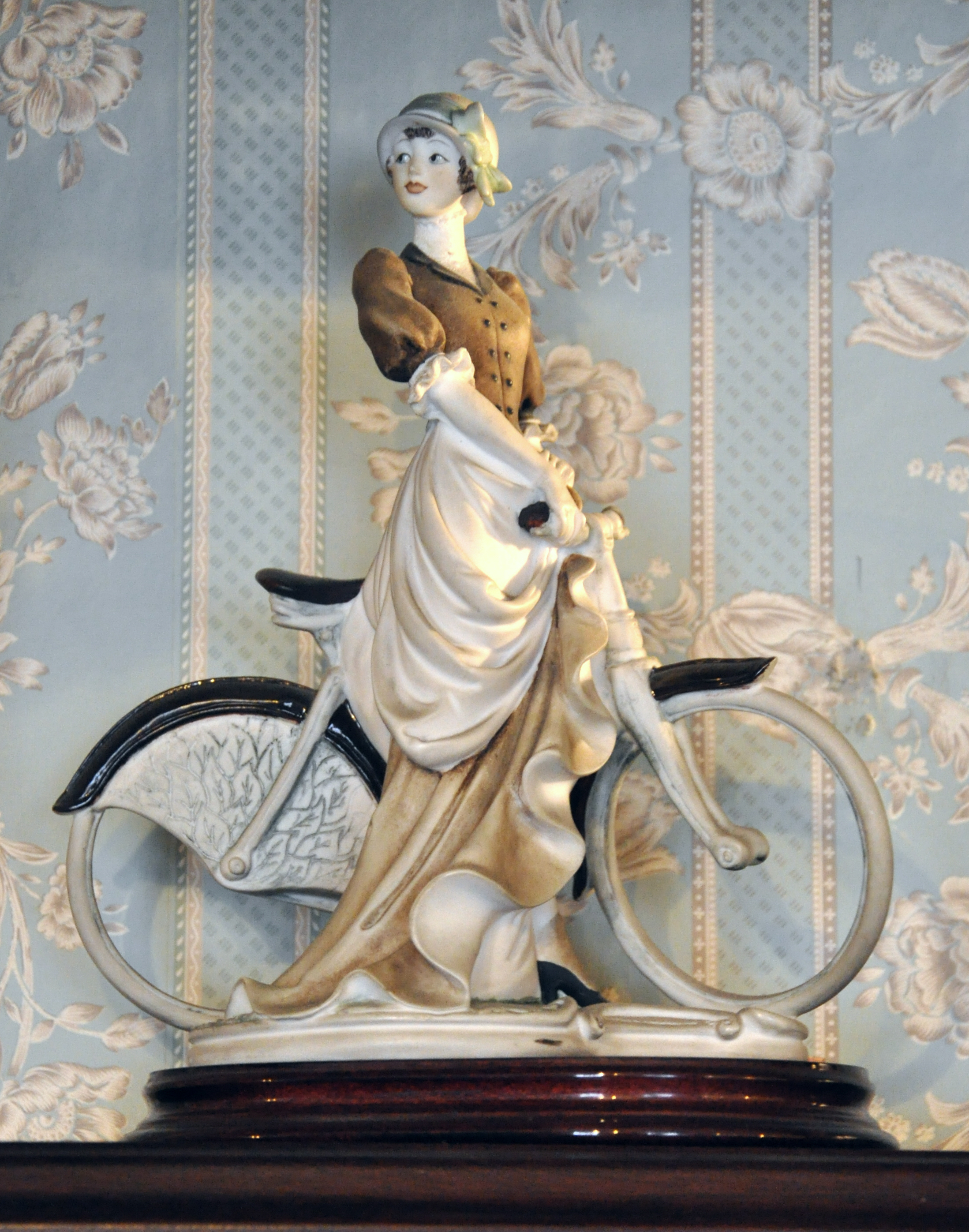
Cyclist sculpture, put on display to illustrate the short story The Adventure of the Solitary Cyclist

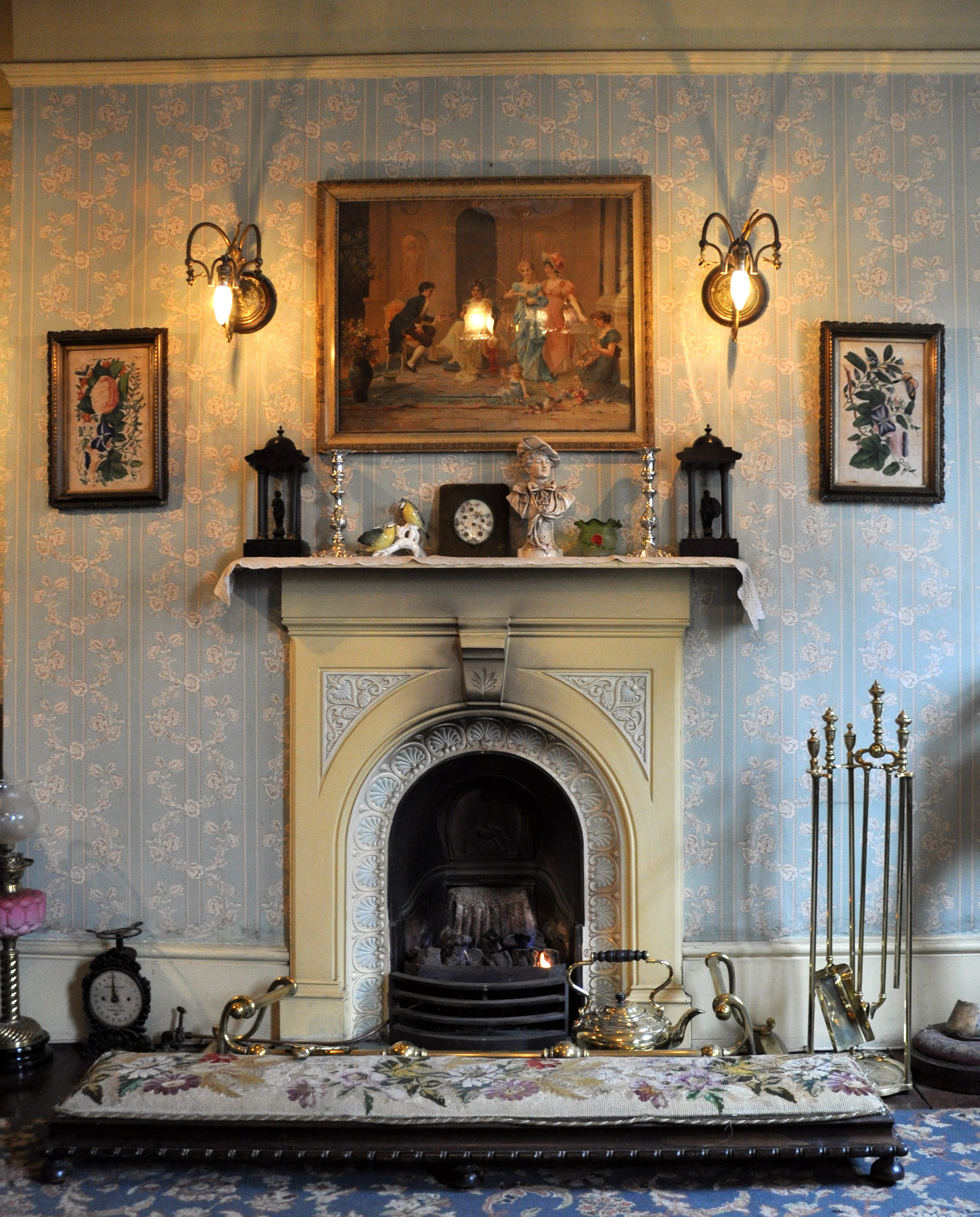
"Mrs Hudson's Room", fireplace

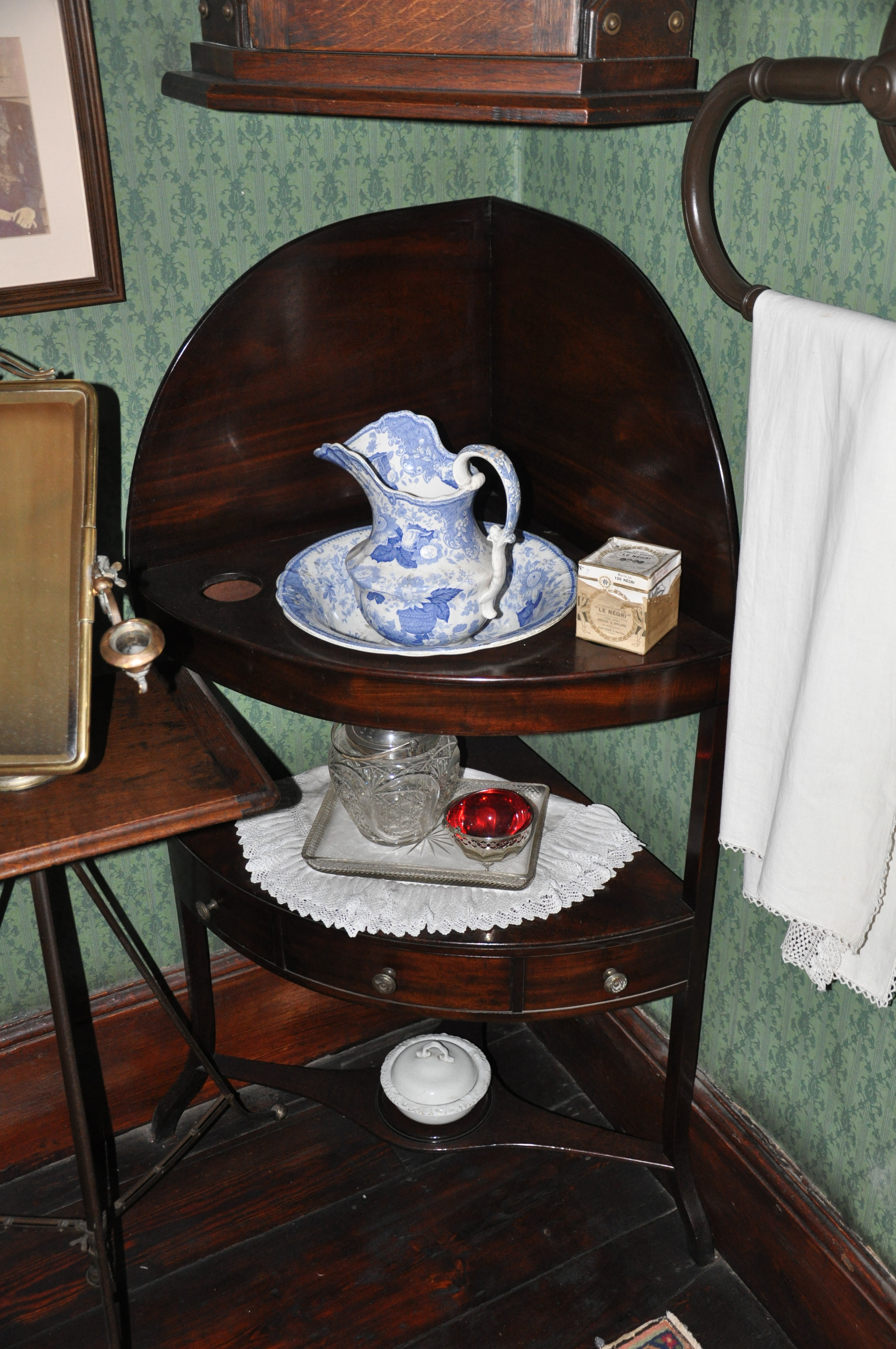
"Dr. Watson's Room", washstand
