= The Great British Teddy Bear Company =

British plush toy company

- Founded: 2002; 24 years ago
- Founder: Paul Jessup, Christine Jessup
- Website: gbteddybear.com

The Great British Teddy Bear Company (founded 2002) is a British plush toy company owned by three generations of the Jessup family.

== History ==
In 2007, Bobby the first official Metropolitan Police Teddy bear was launched at Hamleys in London, the launch was attended by Prime Minister Gordon Brown and celebrities Shane Richie, Lisa Maxwell and the cast of ITV drama The BILL.

It has created teddy bears for Britain's most famous institutions, museums and visitor attractions, these include the official teddy bear: Sherlock for The Sherlock Holmes Museum, Beefeater for the Tower of London, official bear for the Ministry of Defence; Army, Royal Navy and Royal Air Force.

In 2015, The Great British Teddy Bear Company was protected by both copyright and trademark in China, India, Japan and South Korea. GB Teddy Bears are now used under license on a broad range of products including clothing, mobile games and visitor attraction by companies including Bestseller Fashion, Tencent Games, PUBG Mobile, and PolyGroup Holdings.
