= Charles Walter Clark =

British architect

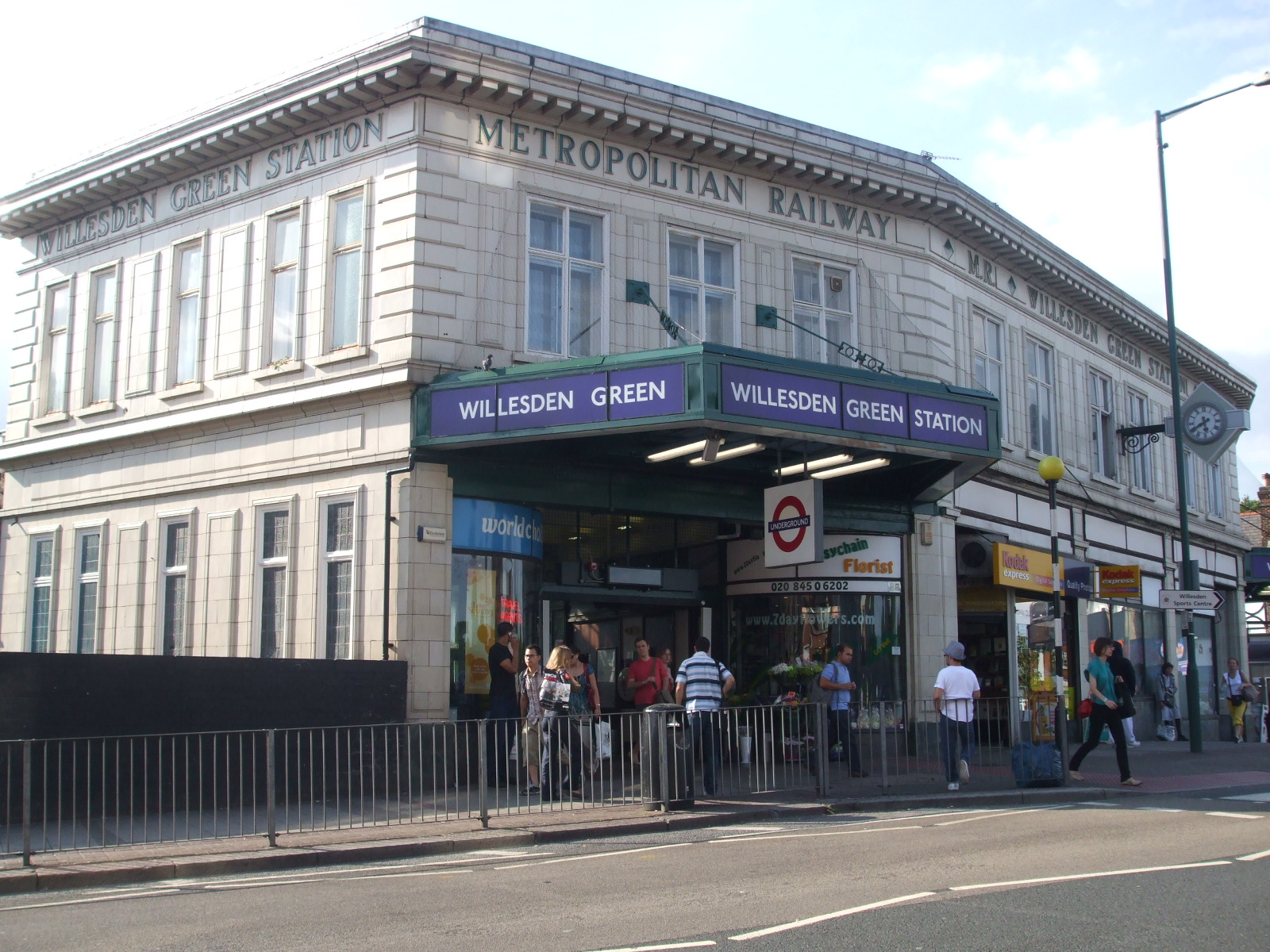
Willesden Green station, designed by Clark in 1925

Charles Walter Clark (1885–1972) was an architect who worked for the Metropolitan Railway from 1911 to 1933 and was responsible for designing 25 stations, five of which are listed buildings today.

== Career ==
Born in 1885, he was educated at Emanuel School then worked for a year for the London, Brighton and South Coast Railway before moving to the Met as assistant architect in 1910. After serving in the Royal Naval Volunteer Reserve during World War I, he was appointed Architect by the Metropolitan Railway in 1921. Elected Fellow of the Royal Institute of British Architects in 1930, he did not join the London Passenger Transport Board in 1933 when the Met was absorbed with the other London underground railways. He died in 1972.

== Buildings ==
Between 1911 and 1933 he designed 25 Metropolitan Railway stations, as well as designing houses in Metro-land and Chiltern Court, the large, luxurious block of apartments over Baker Street station, that opened in 1929. Central London stations were built in a Neoclassical style. These included Farringdon, Aldgate, Edgware Road and Paddington (all still extant today) together with Euston Square and Notting Hill Gate (both demolished). Rural stations, such as those at Watford, Croxley, Northwood Hills and Kingsbury were designed to set the tone for the local development. As of 2017, six of these stations are listed buildings, including Baker Street station, which was re-modelled in 1911–13 and is listed Grade II*. One station is listed by the local authority as being of local importance.

=== List of listed buildings ===
Name	Image	Grade	Lines served	Dates	Notes	Map
Baker Street		II*	Circle, Hammersmith & City, Metropolitan	Opened 1863, rebuilt 1911–13	John Fowler designed the Circle line platforms and the station was rebuilt by Clark. Chiltern Court built above the station in the 1920s, is not included in the listing.	51°31′19.2″N 0°9′25.2″W
Croxley		Local	Metropolitan	1925	Listed by the local authority	51°38′51″N 0°26′28.7″W
Farringdon		II	Circle, Hammersmith & City, Metropolitan	Station built 1865, street level buildings re-built 1922	John Fowler built the original station before it was re-built by Clark	51°31′12″N 0°6′19.1″W
Great Portland Street		II	Circle, Hammersmith & City, Metropolitan	Station built 1863, street level buildings re-built 1912	John Fowler built the original station before it was re-built by Clark	51.523733°N 0.143929°W
Paddington (Praed Street)		II	District, Circle	Station built 1866–68, street level buildings re-built 1915	John Fowler built the original station before it was re-built by Clark	51°31′07″N 0°10′46″W
Watford		II	Metropolitan	c.1925	Brick built in domestic style to set the tone for the local Metro-land development	51°39′27″N 0°25′3″W
Willesden Green		II	Jubilee	Originally built 1879, street level buildings rebuilt 1925	Street buildings re-built by Clark	51°32′57.1″N 0°13′18.1″W
