= The Sherlock Holmes =

Pub in London

Coordinates: 51.5072°N 0.1255°W

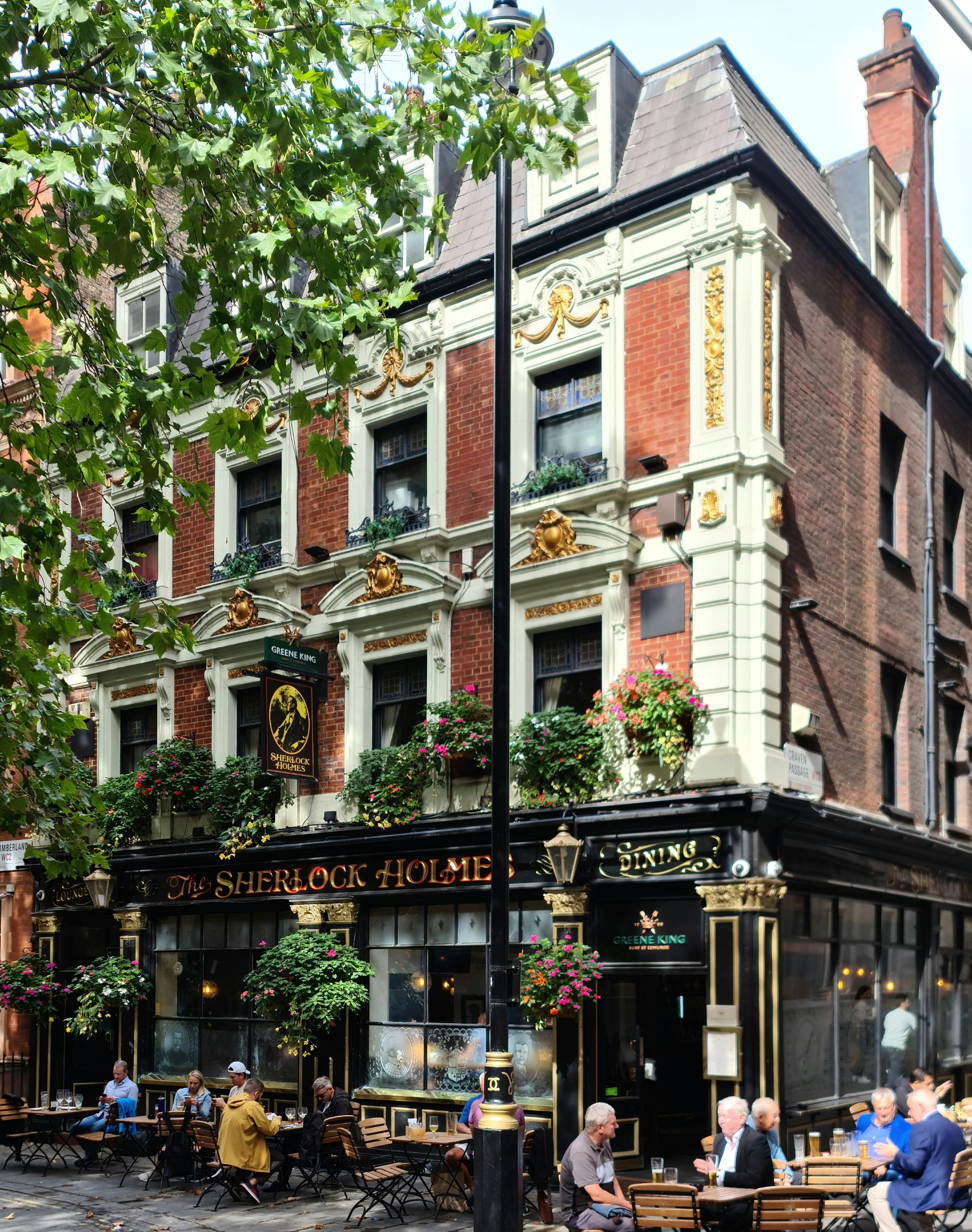
The Sherlock Holmes in 2022

The Sherlock Holmes is a Victorian-themed public house in Northumberland Street near Charing Cross railway station and Trafalgar Square which contains a large collection of memorabilia related to the fictional detective Sherlock Holmes. The original collection was put together for display in Baker Street in London during the Festival of Britain in 1951.

== Northumberland Arms ==
The Sherlock Holmes was originally a small hotel, known briefly in the 1880s as the Northumberland Hotel, and later as the Northumberland Arms, under the latter name appearing in the 1892 Sherlock Holmes story "The Adventure of the Noble Bachelor". The Victorian Turkish baths that Holmes and Watson used to frequent in the stories was located right beside the hotel at 25 Northumberland Avenue. The entrance to the adjacent women's Turkish baths can still be seen in Craven Passage at the rear of the men's baths. It has been conjectured by some Holmes enthusiasts and scholars that the present building was the Northumberland Hotel which featured in the 1901 novel The Hound of the Baskervilles.

== Festival of Britain ==
The displays in The Sherlock Holmes grew out of the Festival of Britain of 1951, when Marylebone Public Library, with the support of the Abbey National (which had its headquarters on the purported site of 221B Baker Street), decided to create an exhibition based on the fictional detective. Four Holmes enthusiasts (with the support of the family of Sir Arthur Conan Doyle) designed and planned the exhibition, collecting materials (many of them donated) for display, including a Persian slipper to hold Holmes's tobacco, a gasogene for Dr Watson's soda, and a jack-knife for Holmes to pin his unanswered correspondence to the mantelpiece with. In Abbey House on Baker Street Holmes' sitting room at 221B Baker Street was created. Each day crumpets were supplied by a local baker and these were left on a plate in the sitting room with two different sets of bite marks.

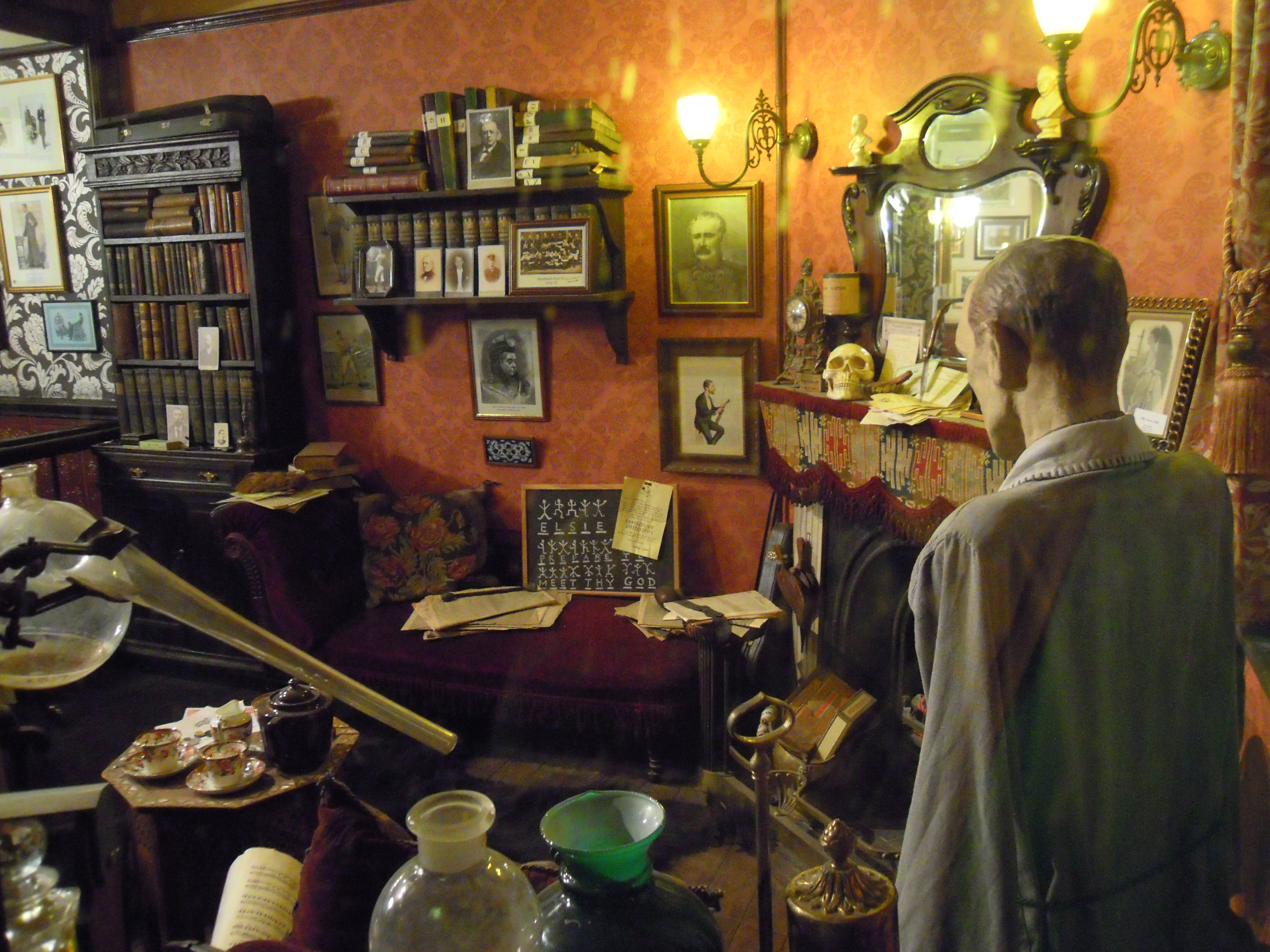
Rear view of the reconstruction of Holmes' sitting room

The Northumberland Arms was refurbished and reopened under its present name in December 1957. Its owners, Whitbread & Co., were fortunate to be able to purchase the entire Festival of Britain Sherlock Holmes exhibit after it returned from a world tour, including New York where it was displayed at the Plaza Galleries. The idea was to install the exhibit in its own permanent home in a theme pub in the centre of London where it would appeal to Holmes enthusiasts from around the world who visited that city.

The pub was restored to a late Victorian form and the main exhibit, a detailed replica of a corner of Holmes' fictional apartment, was installed on the upstairs floor, where it can be viewed behind a plate glass wall from both the roof garden and the first-floor Sherlock Holmes restaurant and through small windows in the upstairs hallway. The displays in the bars include theatre posters, Dr Watson's old service revolver, political cartoons and the stuffed and mounted head of the Hound of the Baskervilles.

Over the years the exhibits in the downstairs bar areas have been augmented with photographs of the actors who have played Holmes and Watson since the original display was set up. The collection is curated and maintained by the Sherlock Holmes Society of London.

Today The Sherlock Holmes is owned by the Bury St Edmunds–based brewer Greene King.

== Gallery ==
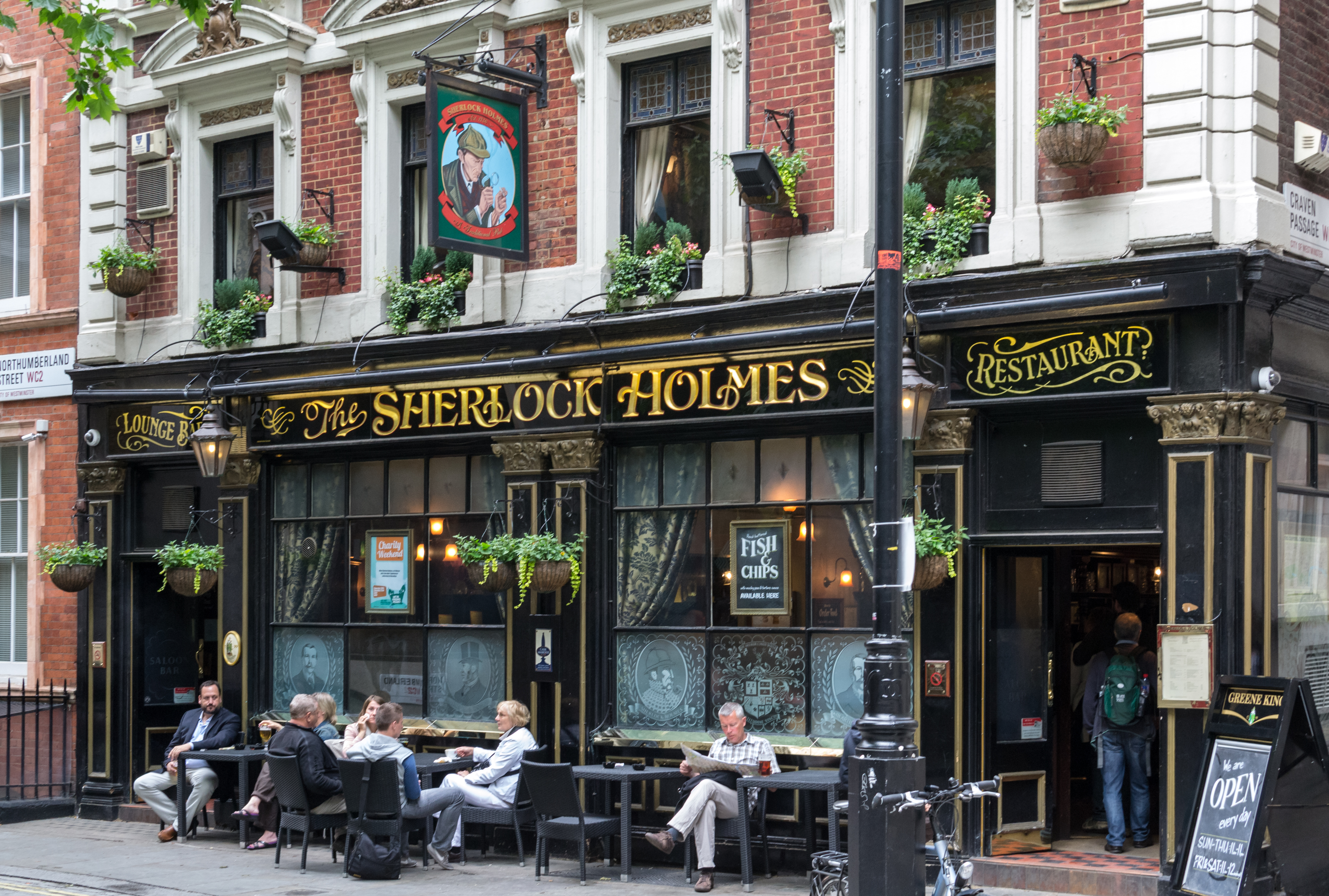
The Sherlock Holmes public house

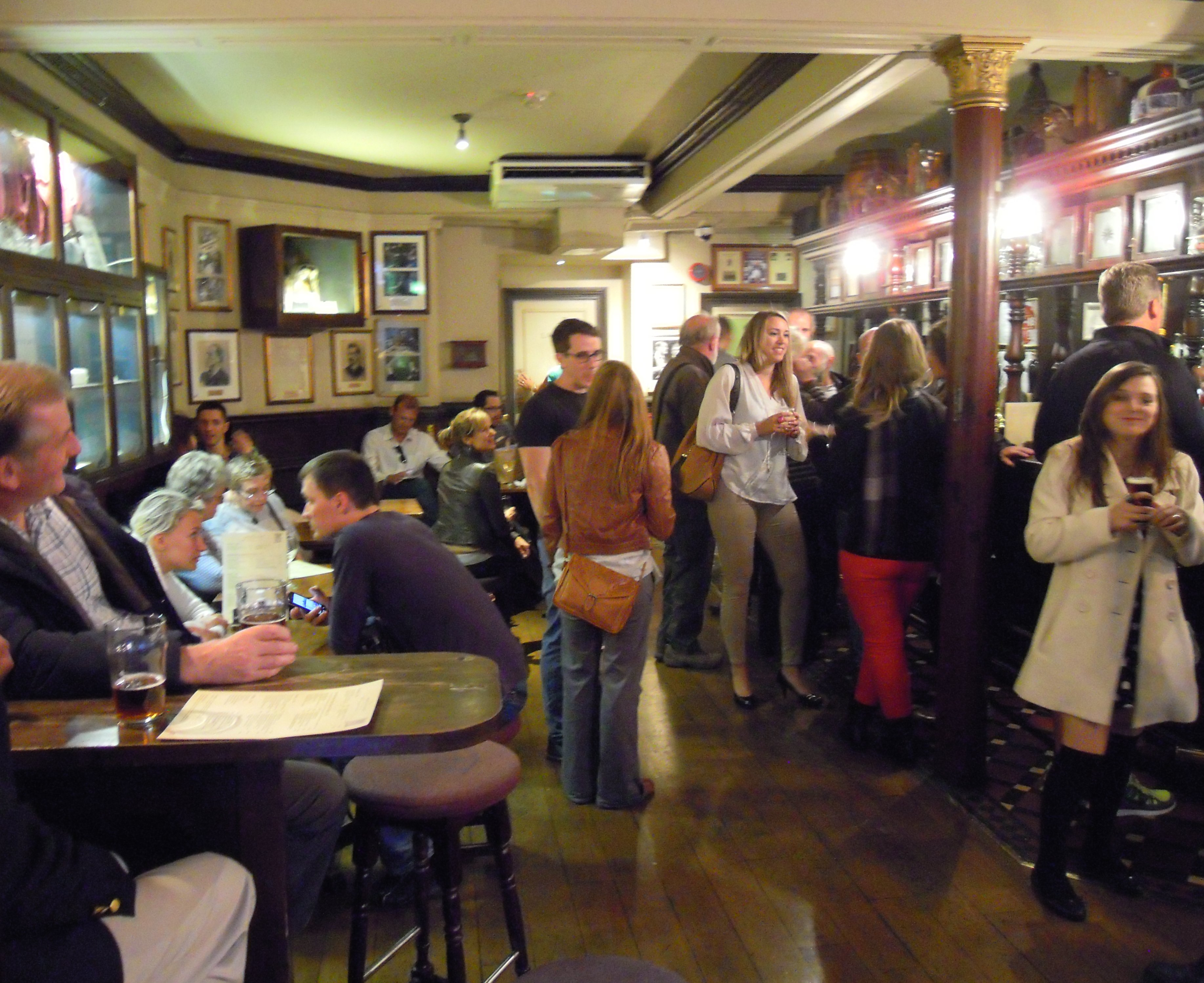
The bar, showing some of the memorabilia on display, including the head of the Hound of the Baskervilles

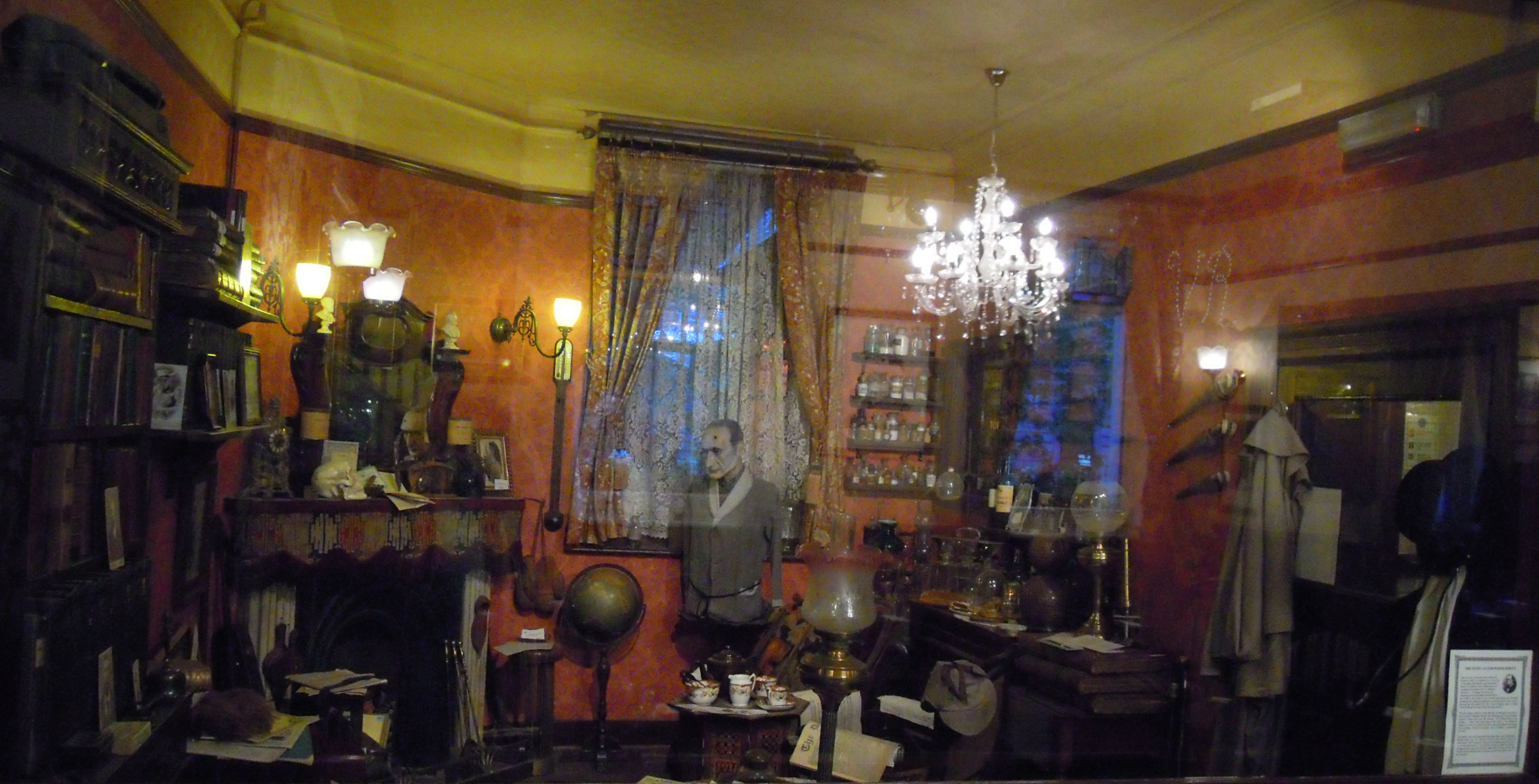
The reconstruction of the sitting room of 221B Baker Street in the restaurant
