= 64 Baker Street =

Commercial property in central London, England

Coordinates: 51.5191°N 0.1560°W

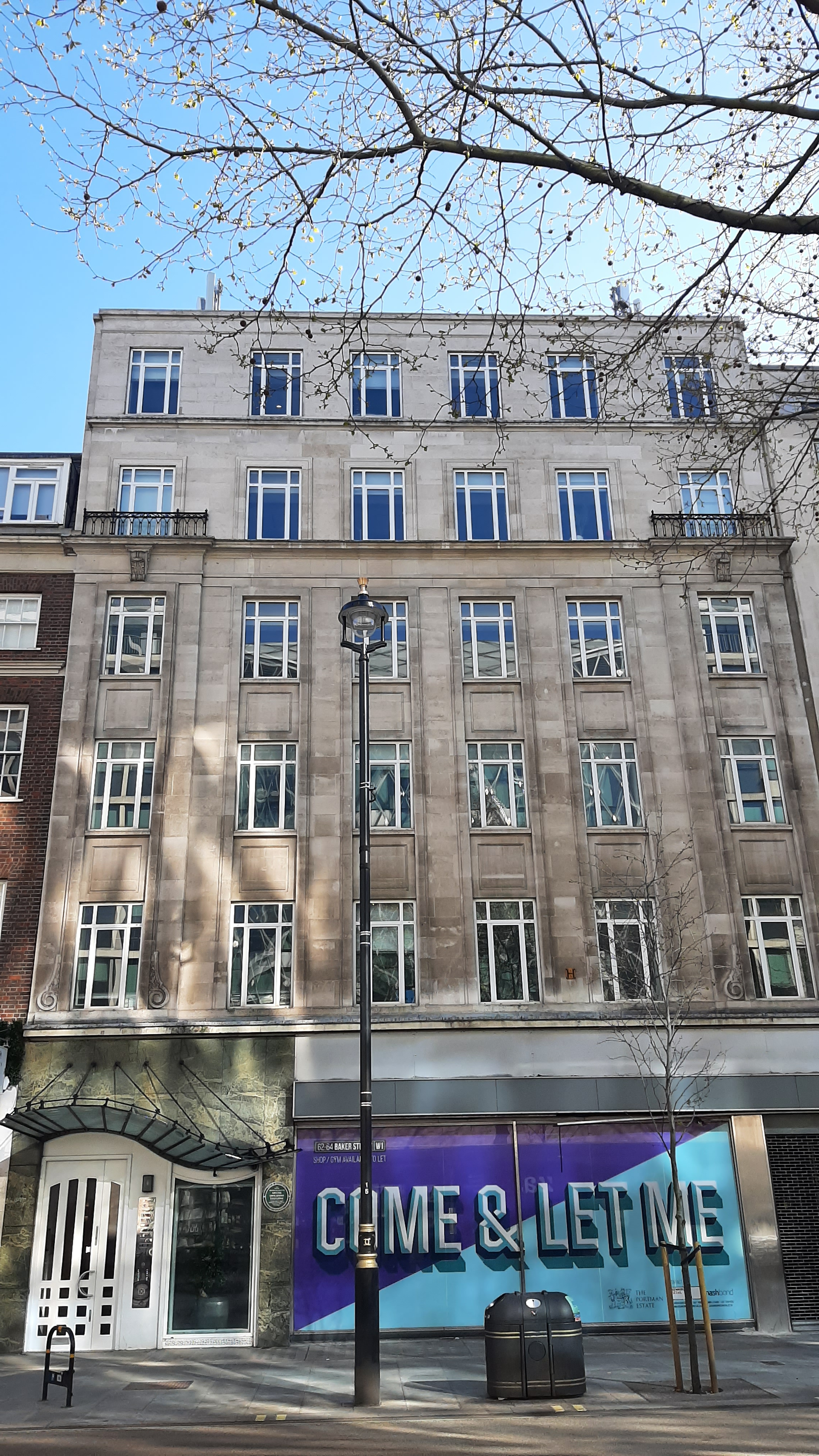
64 Baker Street, as photographed Spring 2021.

64 Baker Street is a commercial property in Baker Street, central London. It was the address of the headquarters of the Special Operations Executive.

== History ==
The building was completed in the first half of the 20th century and, after becoming part of the Government estate, was let to the Prison Commission. It became the headquarters of the Special Operations Executive in September 1940. A plaque on the building's face gives details of its former inhabitants.

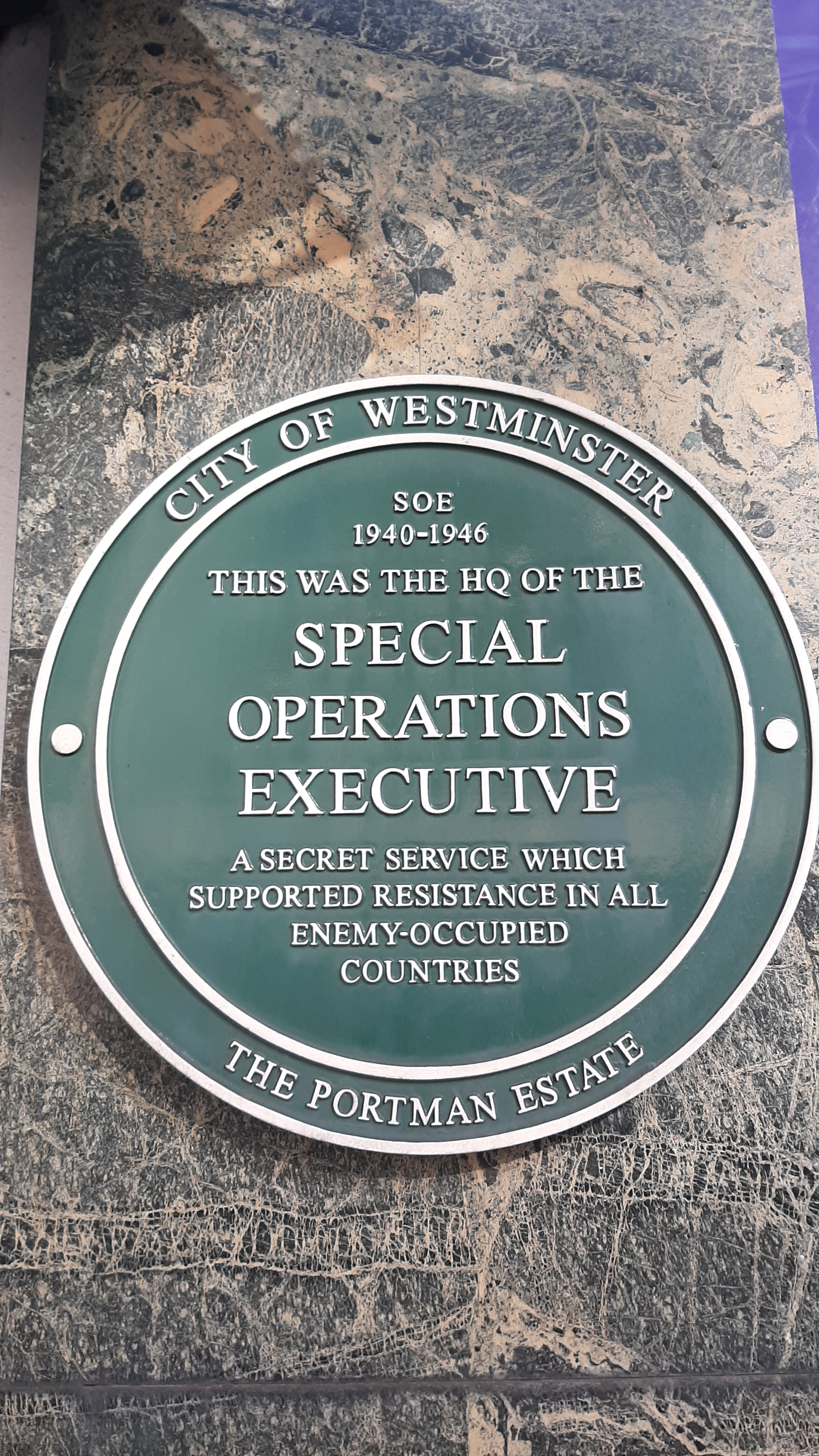
Plaque at street level

After the war, the property was occupied by EMI Classics before it was converted for retail use.

== See also ==
- 221B Baker Street
