= Baker Street =

Street in the City of Westminster

Coordinates: 51.5200°N 0.1566°W

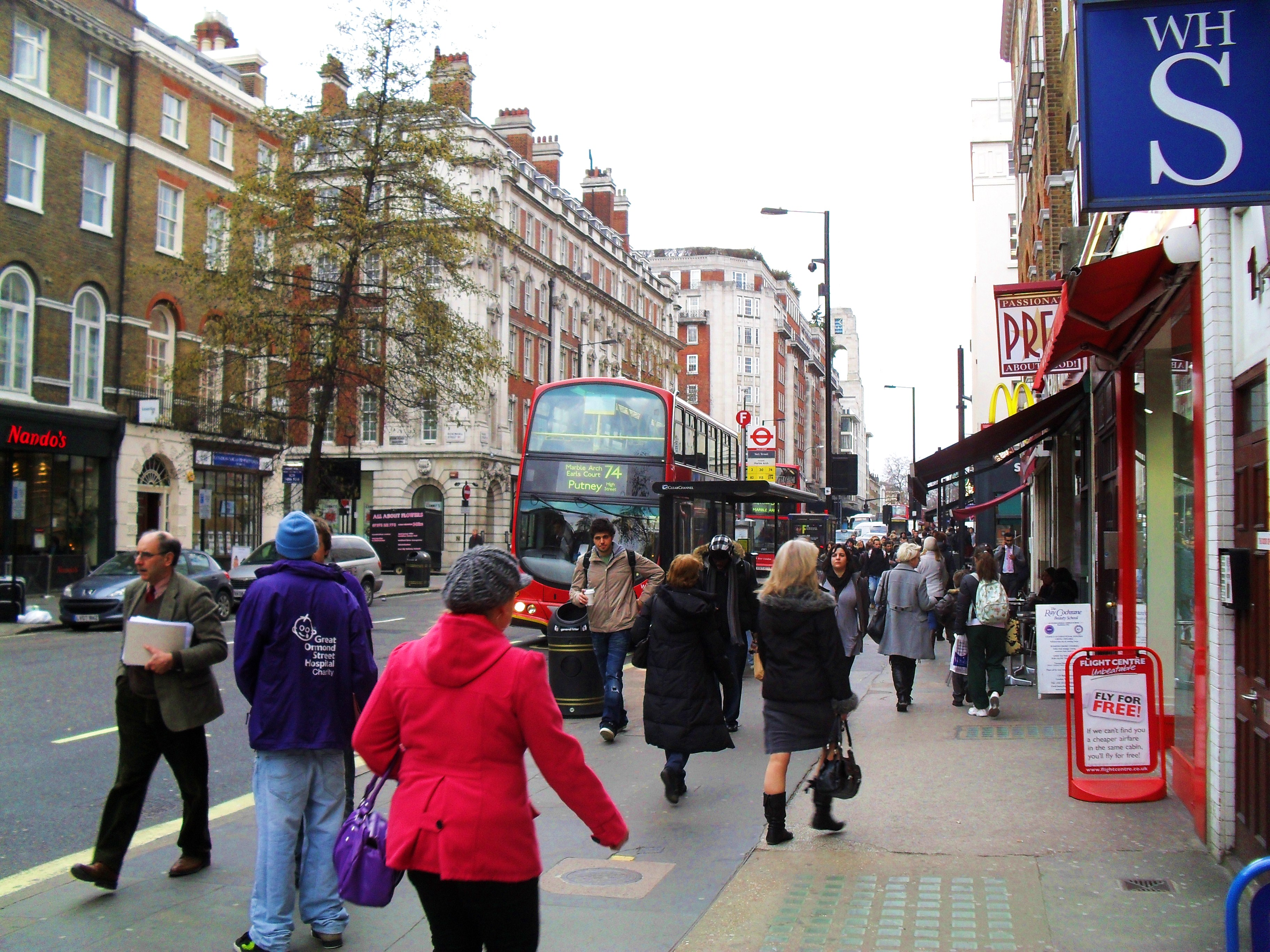
- Interactive map of Baker Street
- Length: 0.6 mi (0.97 km)
- Location: Westminster, London, England
- Postal code: NW1
- Nearest Tube station: Baker Street
- From: Park Road
- To: Portman Square

Other
- Known for: Sherlock Holmes's residence (221B Baker Street) · Setting of Gerry Rafferty's hit song · Baker Street robbery

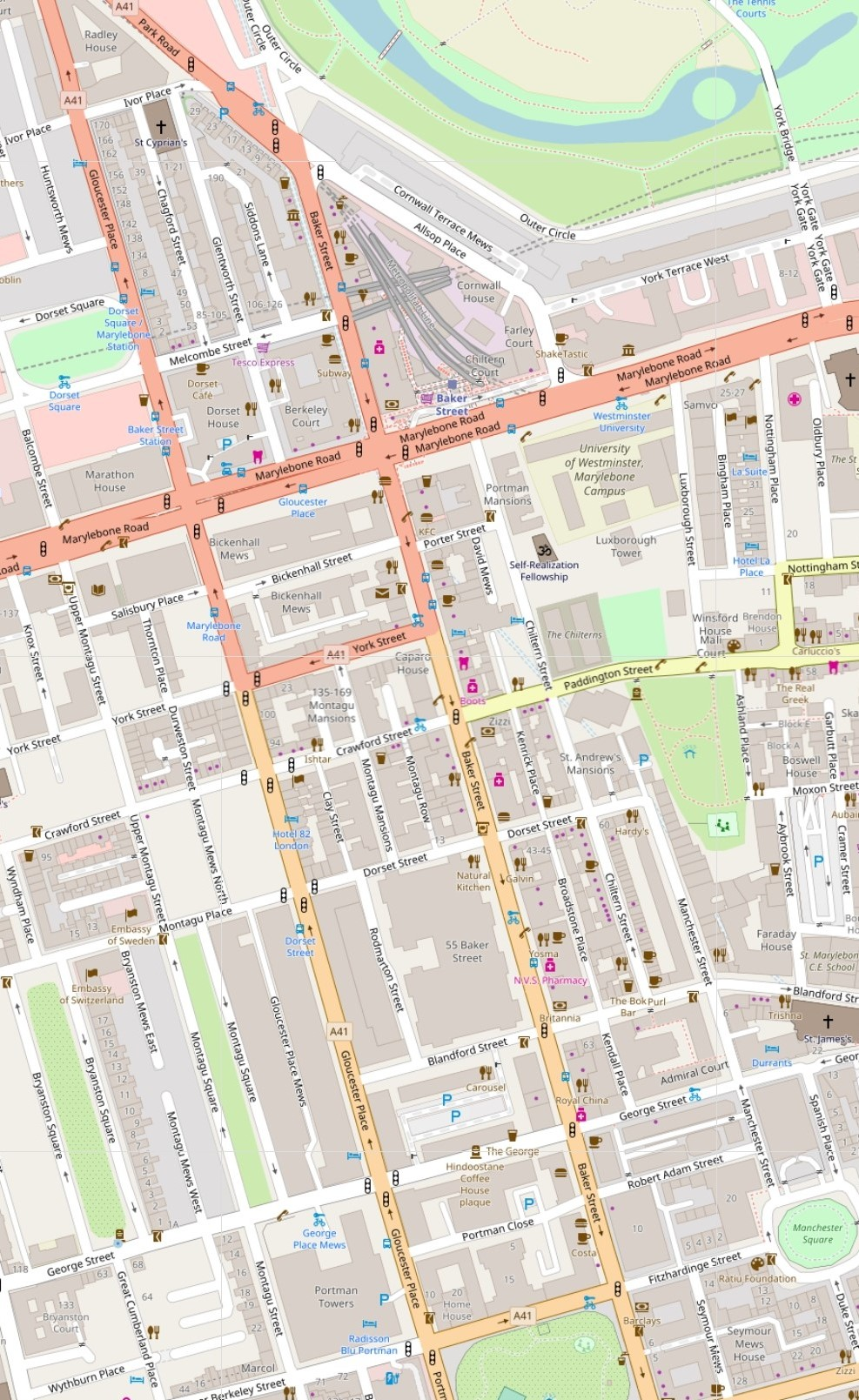
Baker Street area map

Baker Street is a street in the Marylebone district of the City of Westminster. Some historians suggest it was named after builder William Baker's son, who finished building the street. The area was originally high class residential, but now is mainly occupied by commercial premises.

The street is referenced in multiple popular works. Fictional detective Sherlock Holmes lived at 221B Baker Street, a fictional address on the north of the street. A 1978 hit song by Gerry Rafferty is titled "Baker Street".

== Location ==
Baker Street is a busy thoroughfare, lying in postcode areas NW1/W1 and forming part of the A41. It runs south from Regent's Park, at the junction with Park Road and Outer Circle, and crosses Marylebone Road, Dorset Street, Blandford Street and George Street. At Fitzhardinge Street, it becomes Portman Square for a short stretch and then continues as Orchard Street until it meets with Oxford Street. In 2019, the until-then one-way street was changed to accommodate lanes running in both directions.

The crossroads of Baker Street and Marylebone Road was historically known as Marylebone Circus, which is still its unofficial name.

== History ==
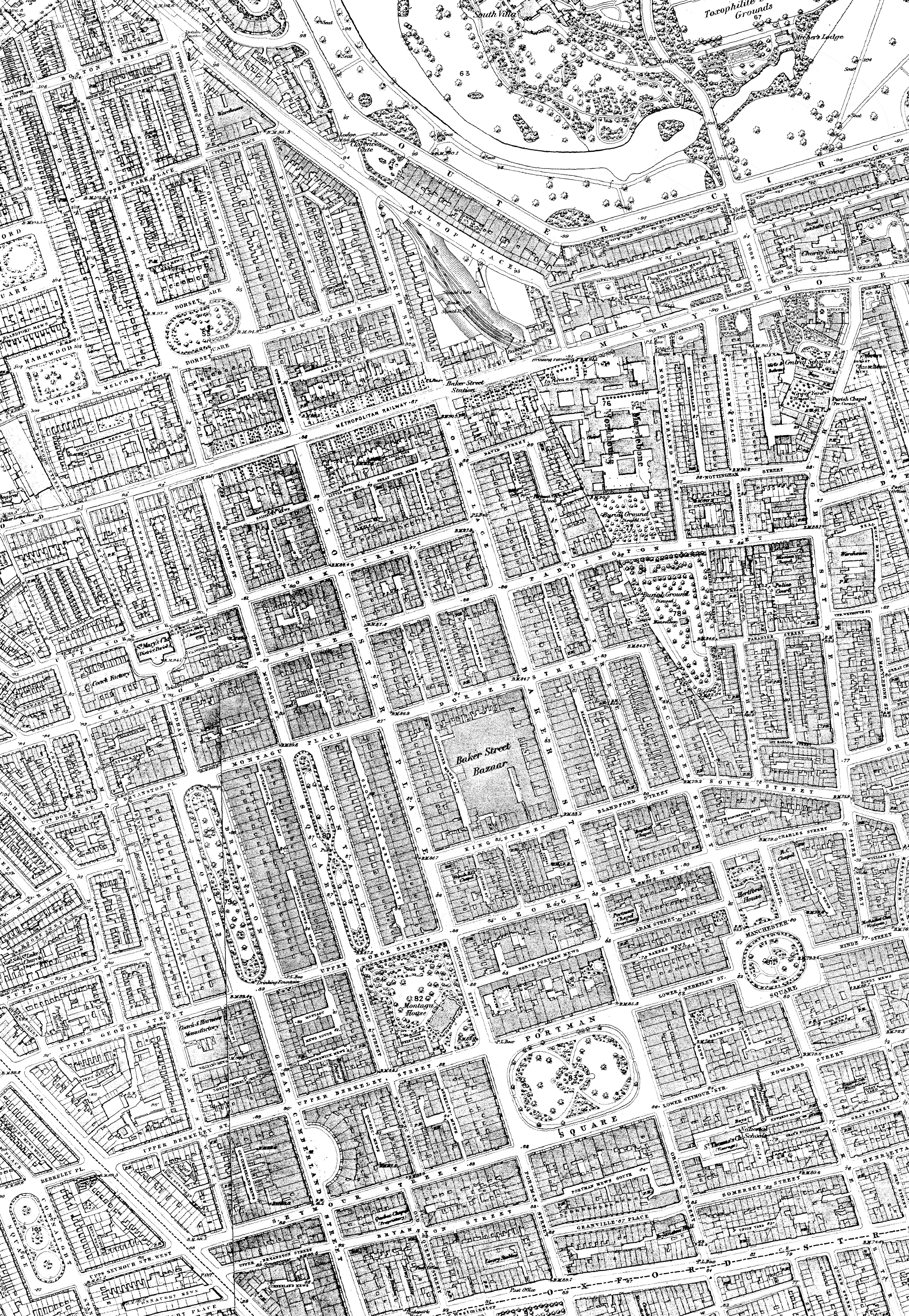
Baker Street (centre vertically) on an 1875 Ordnance Survey map.

Baker Street lies on the Portman Estate, approximately 300 acres of lands acquired in 1553 by Sir William Portman. However, development did not start until 200 years later. In the 1750s, William Baker, "a Gentleman of Marylebone," leased land from the Portman Estate, and laid out Baker Street in 1755. He also developed Orchard Street, Portman Street and other neighbouring roads lying north of Oxford Street.

=== 19th century ===
In 1835, the first wax museum of Madame Tussauds was opened on Baker Street. The museum moved, just around the corner, to Marylebone Road in 1884. Also in 1835 the sculptor James Fillans came to live and work from 82 Baker Street.

Thomas Charles Druce ran the Baker Street Bazaar (which would become Druce & Co. furniture manufacturers) until his death in 1864, and was later subject of the Druce Portland Case.

=== 20th century ===
Residents of the prestigious mansion block, Chiltern Court on the Regent's Park end of Baker Street include the novelists Arnold Bennett and H. G. Wells who are commemorated with a blue plaque.

In 1940 the headquarters of the Special Operations Executive moved to 64 Baker Street. They came to be known as the"Baker Street Irregulars", after Sherlock Holmes' gang of street urchins of the same name.

The Beatles' Apple Boutique was based at 94 Baker Street from 1967 to 1968.

A significant robbery of a branch of Lloyds Bank took place on Baker Street in 1971.

For many years the head office of Marks & Spencer, formerly the United Kingdom's largest retailer, was at "Michael House" (named in parallel with the group's "St Michael" brand), 55 Baker Street, until the company relocated to the Paddington Basin in 2004. This was one of the best known corporate buildings in the United Kingdom, and has since been redeveloped as a modern office complex by London & Regional Properties to a design by Make Architects and Expedition Engineering.

A London County Council blue plaque commemorates Prime Minister William Pitt the Younger who lived at 120 Baker Street from 1803 to 1804. British singer Dusty Springfield lived on Baker Street in the 1960s.

=== 21st century ===
In February 2019, Baker Street was converted from a one-way southbound street to a two-way street.

== Buildings ==
The Seychelles maintains a High Commission of the Seychelles, London (Consulate) at 111 Baker Street.

== Transport ==
The street is served by the London Underground's Baker Street tube station, developed in the early 1860s, and one of the world's oldest and longest surviving underground stations. Next door is Transport for London's lost property office.

== In popular culture ==
- In fiction, Sherlock Holmes, Basil of Baker Street (The Great Mouse Detective), Sherlock Hound, Danger Mouse, Sexton Blake, Carland Cross and James Black of Case Closed have all resided along the road.
- "Baker Street" is a song by Gerry Rafferty, released in 1978. The song was a major worldwide hit, reaching Number 3 in the UK singles chart and Number 2 on the Billboard Hot 100. Rafferty wrote the song during a time he stayed at the home of friend who lived off Baker Street when in London.
- The song "Some Girls" by the Rolling Stones, from the album of same name released in 1978, includes the lyrics "Give me all your money, give me all your gold / I'll buy you a house in Baker Street, and give you half of what I own".
- "Baker St. Muse" is a song from Jethro Tull's album Minstrel in the Gallery, which was released in 1975.
- The 2008 film The Bank Job was loosely based on the 1971 Baker Street robbery of Lloyds Bank.
- Yomiko Readman of Hideyuki Kurata's light novel series, Read or Die owns a flat on Baker Street for when she works in London as an undercover field agent for the British Library Special Operations Unit (its headquarters located underneath the King's Library of the British Museum).

== Gallery ==
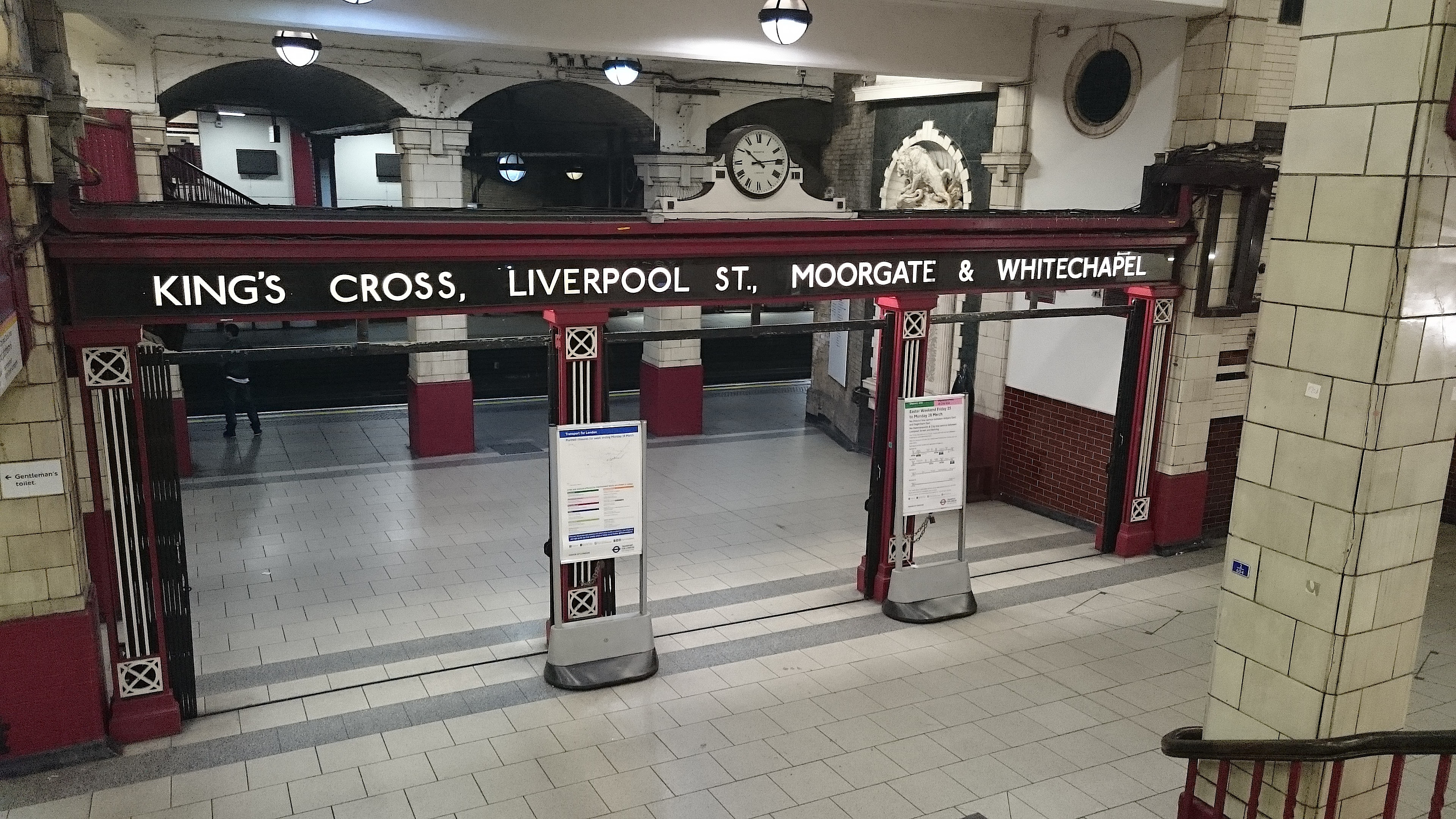
Baker Street tube station interior

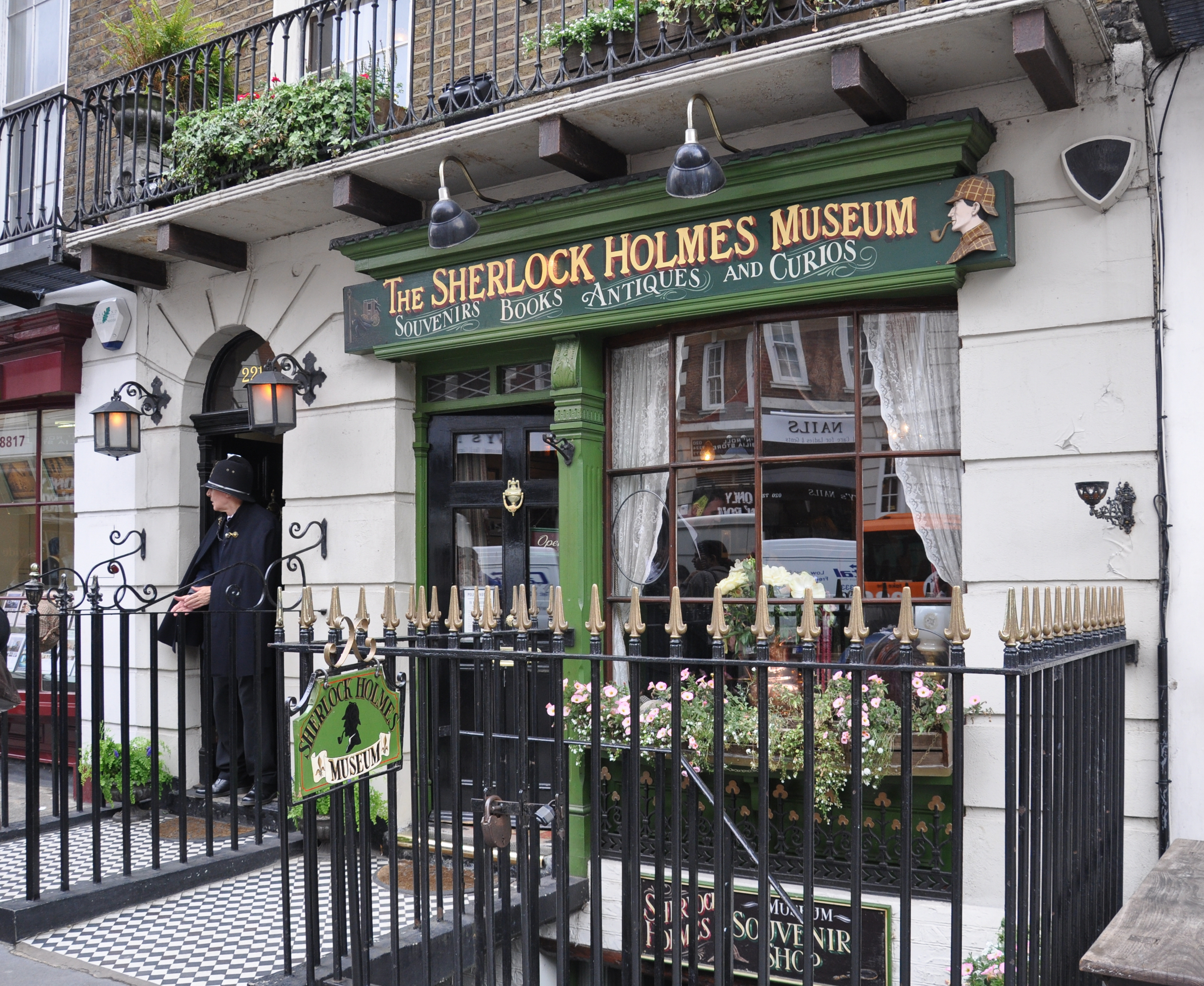
Sherlock Holmes Museum

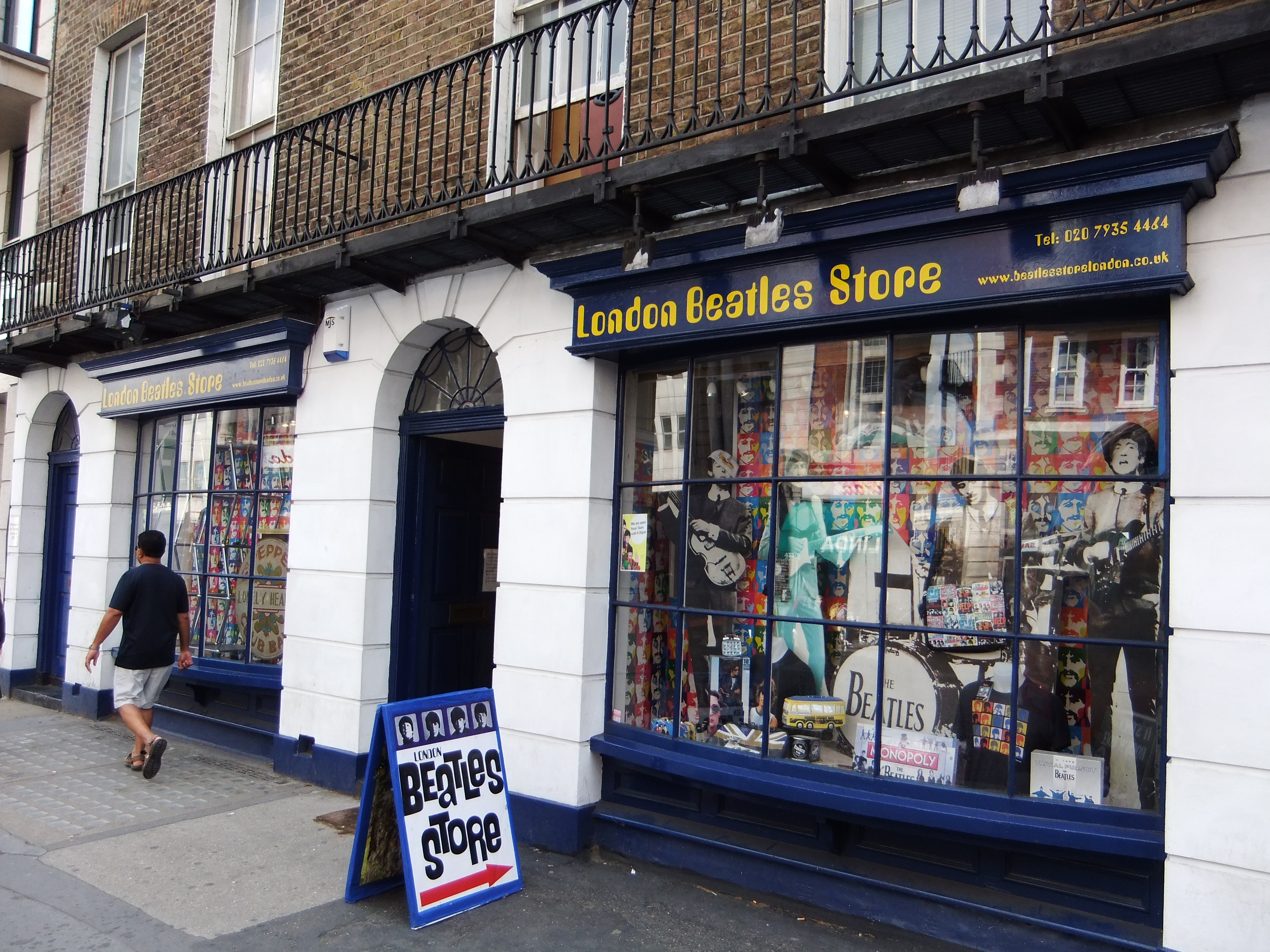
London Beatles Store

== See also ==
- List of eponymous roads in London
