= 221B Baker Street =

Address of the fictional detective Sherlock Holmes

Coordinates: 51°31′24″N 0°09′30″W

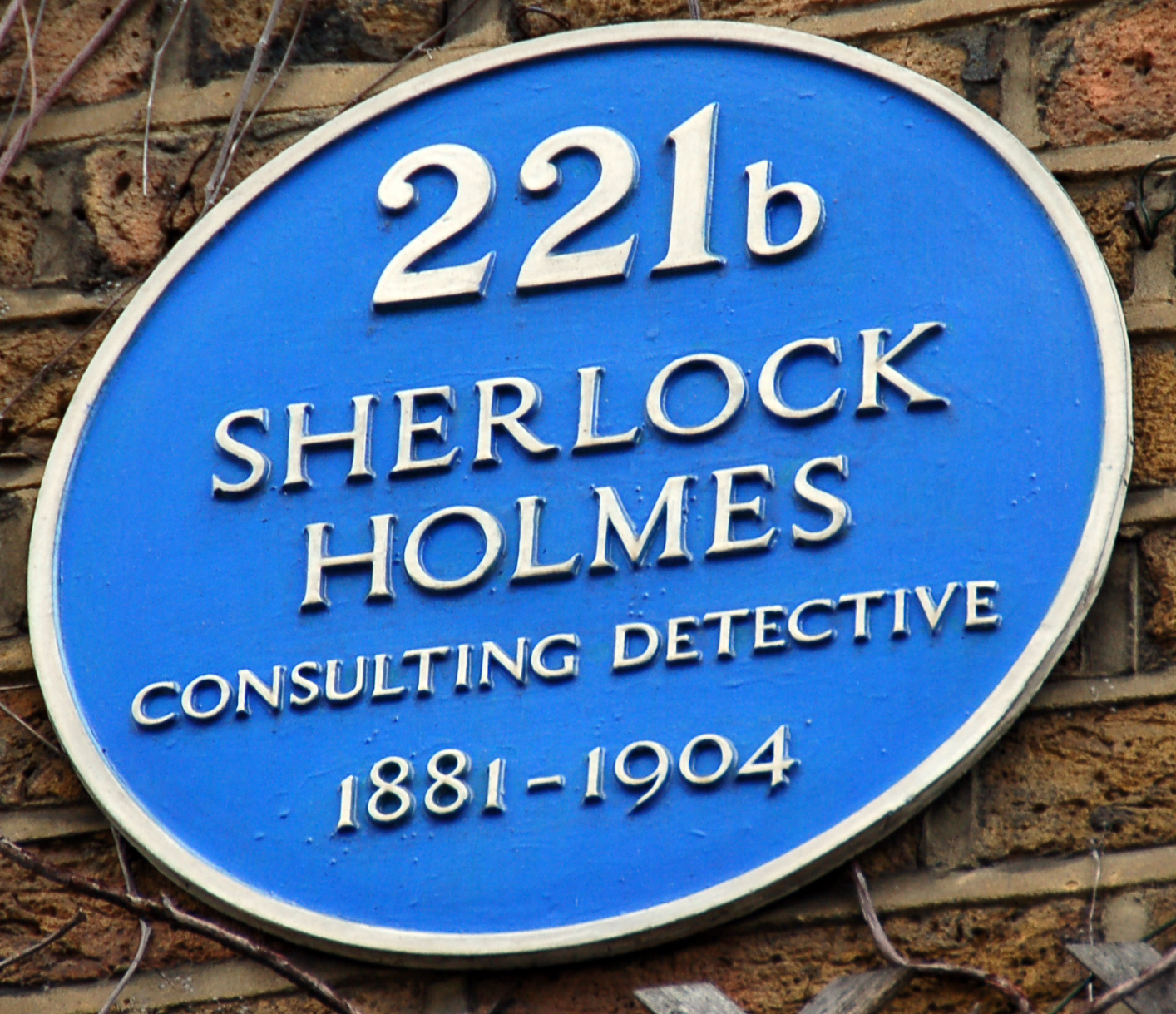
Blue plaque at Sherlock Holmes Museum on Baker Street, London.

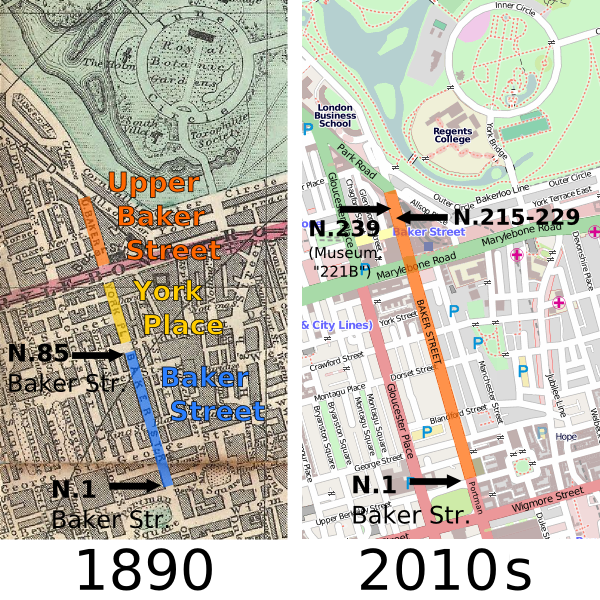
Baker Street in 1890 and the present day. N.85 was the last number of Baker Street in 1890 (until 1930). N.215–229 is the current building including N.221. N.239 is the Sherlock Holmes Museum, with "221B" written above the door.

221B Baker Street is the London address of the fictional detective Sherlock Holmes, created by author Sir Arthur Conan Doyle. In the United Kingdom, postal addresses with a number followed by a letter may indicate a separate address within a larger, often residential building. Baker Street in the late 19th century was a high-class residential district, and Holmes's apartment would probably have been part of a Georgian terrace.

The residence was introduced in the novel A Study in Scarlet (1887). At the time when the Holmes stories were published, did addresses in Baker Street not go as high as 221. Baker Street was later extended, and in 1932 the Abbey National Building Society moved into premises at 219–229 Baker Street. For many years, Abbey National employed a full-time secretary to answer mail addressed to Sherlock Holmes. In 1990, a blue plaque signifying 221B Baker Street was installed at the Sherlock Holmes Museum, situated elsewhere on the same block, and there followed a 15-year dispute between Abbey National and the Holmes Museum for the right to receive mail addressed to 221B Baker Street. Since the closure of Abbey House in 2005, ownership of the address by the Holmes Museum has not been challenged, despite its location between 237 and 241 Baker Street. Its postal code is NW1 6XE.

== Doyle's intentions ==
We met next day as he had arranged, and inspected the rooms at No. 221B, Baker Street, of which he had spoken at our meeting. They consisted of a couple of comfortable bed-rooms and a single large airy sitting-room, cheerfully furnished, and illuminated by two broad windows.

— Arthur Conan Doyle, A Study in Scarlet, 1887

When the Sherlock Holmes stories were first published, street numbers in Baker Street did not go as high as 221.

The section north of Marylebone Road near Regent's Park – now including 221 Baker Street – was known in Doyle's lifetime as Upper Baker Street. In his notes for the first Holmes story, Doyle put Holmes's house in Upper Baker Street. However, a British crime novelist named Nigel Morland claimed that, late in Doyle's life, he identified the junction of Baker Street and George Street, about 500 metres south of the Marylebone Road, as the location of 221B. Sherlockian experts have also held to alternative theories as to where the original 221B was located and have maintained that it was further down Baker Street.

While at medical school in Edinburgh from 1876 to 1880, Doyle resided at 23 George Square near the university. The residence next door is 23-B.

== Real 221B Baker Street addresses ==
=== Abbey National ===
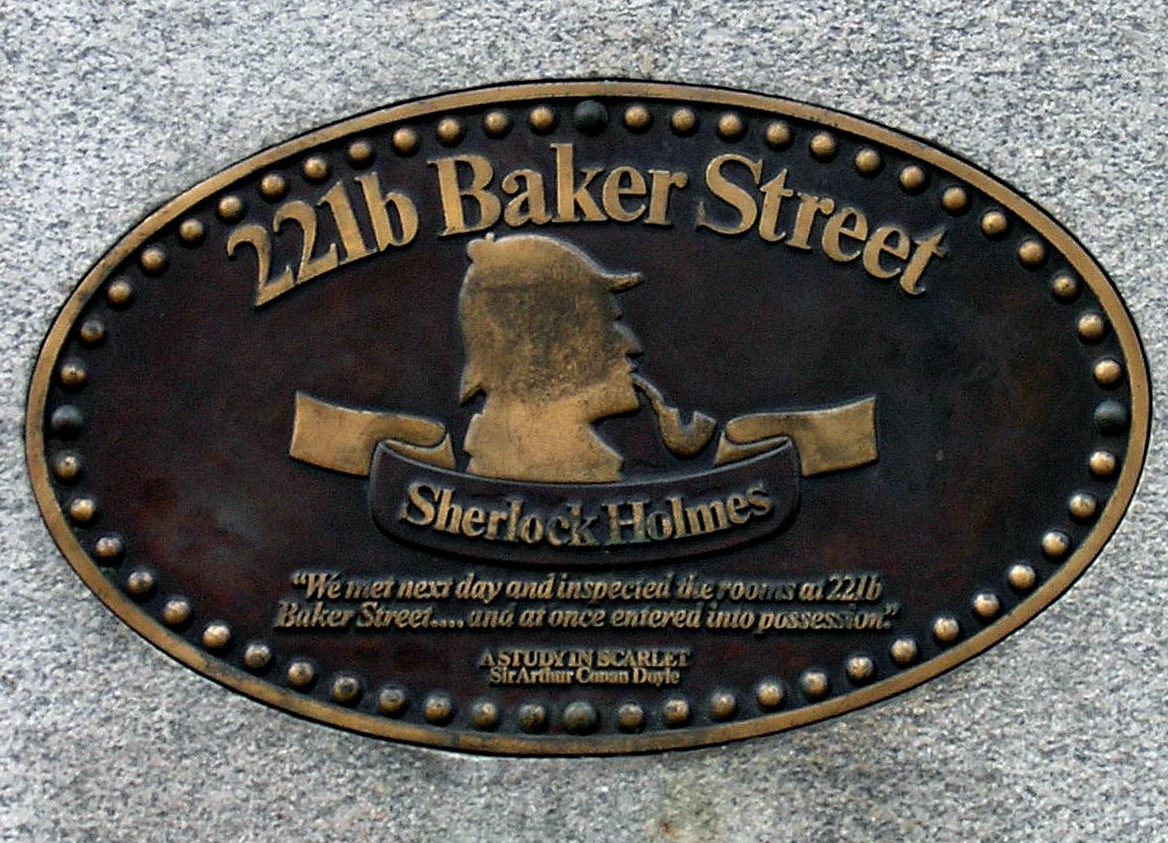
The plaque on the former Abbey House HQ.

When street numbers were reallocated in the 1930s, the block of odd numbers from 215 to 229 was assigned to an Art Deco building known as Abbey House, constructed in 1932 for the Abbey Road Building Society, which the society and its successor (which subsequently became Abbey National plc) occupied until 2002.

Almost immediately, the building society started receiving as many as 30 letters a month to Sherlock Holmes, including cards on 6 January, the date fans believe is his birthdate. It appointed a permanent "secretary to Sherlock Holmes" to answer them. A bronze plaque on the front of Abbey House carried a picture of Holmes and a quotation, but was removed from the building several years ago; its present whereabouts are unknown. In 1999, Abbey National sponsored a bronze statue of Sherlock Holmes at the entrance to Baker Street tube station.

=== Sherlock Holmes Museum ===
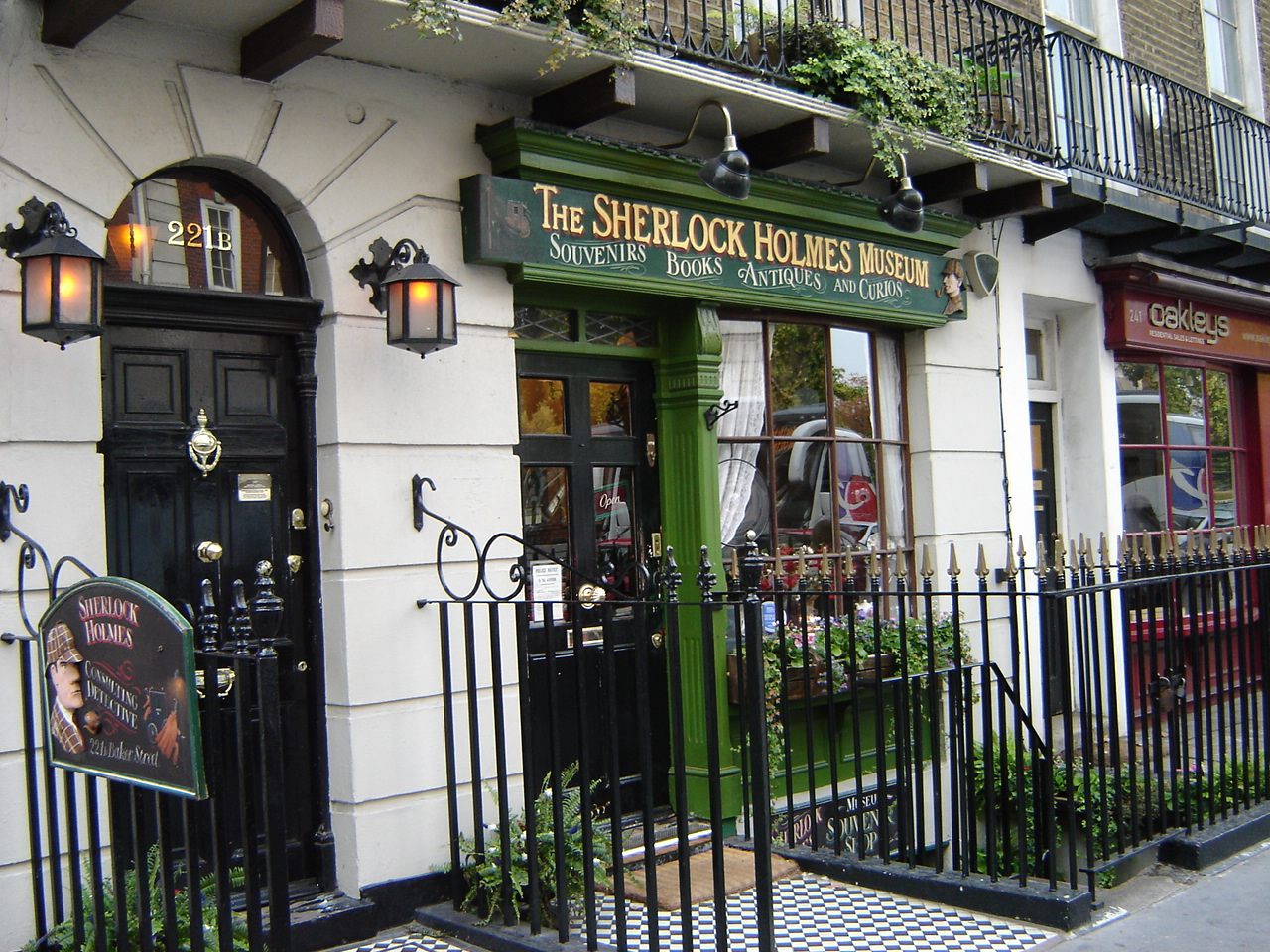
221B Baker Street, London.

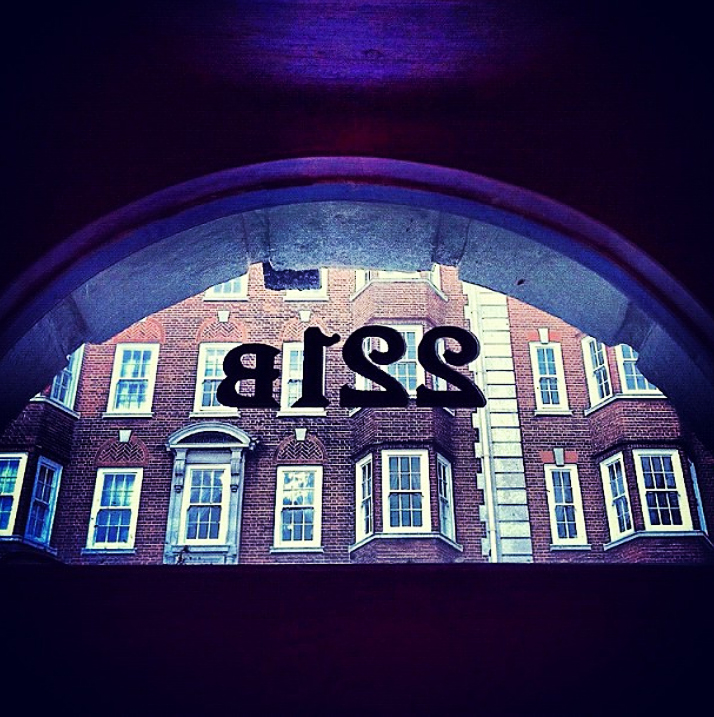
221B Baker Street from inside.

The Sherlock Holmes Museum is situated within an 1815 townhouse very similar to the 221B described in the stories and is located between 237 and 241 Baker Street. It displays exhibits in period rooms, wax figures and Holmes memorabilia, with the famous study overlooking Baker Street the highlight of the museum. The description of the house can be found throughout the stories, including the 17 steps leading from the ground-floor hallway to the first-floor study.

According to the published stories, "221B Baker Street" was a suite of rooms on the first floor of a lodging house above a flight of 17 steps. The main study overlooked Baker Street, and Holmes's bedroom was adjacent to this room at the rear of the house, with Dr. Watson's bedroom being on the floor above, overlooking a rear yard that had a plane tree in it.

=== Address controversy ===
The street number 221B was assigned to the Sherlock Holmes Museum on 27 March 1990 (replacing the logical address 239 Baker Street) when the Leader of Westminster City Council, Shirley Porter, unveiled a blue plaque signifying the address of 221B Baker Street. She was invited to renumber the museum's building to coincide with its official opening (and because the number 221B had not been included in the original planning consent for the museum granted in October 1989).

A long-running dispute over the number arose between the Sherlock Holmes Museum, the building society Abbey National (which had previously answered the mail addressed to Sherlock Holmes) and subsequently the local Westminster City Council. The main objection to the museum's role in answering the letters was that the number 221B bestowed on the museum by the council was out of sequence with the other numbers in the street: an issue that has since vexed local bureaucrats, who have striven for years to keep street numbers in sequence. In 2005, Abbey National vacated their headquarters in Baker Street, which left the museum to battle with Westminster City Council to end the dispute over the number, which had created negative publicity. Eventually the museum was granted special permission by the City of Westminster to bear the address of 221B Baker Street.

In 2018, Quartz revealed that, according to court documents and the Panama Papers, the property was owned at least partially by relatives of Nursultan Nazarbayev, then Kazakhstani president.

In 2020, The Times confirmed that in addition to various other properties between 215 and 237 Baker Street totalling around £140 million, the current property is jointly owned by the daughter of the former Kazakhstani president, Dariga Nazarbayeva and her son Nurali Aliyev. Ownership was transferred from Nazarbayeva's ex-husband Rakhat Aliyev after his death in 2015.

== In other media ==
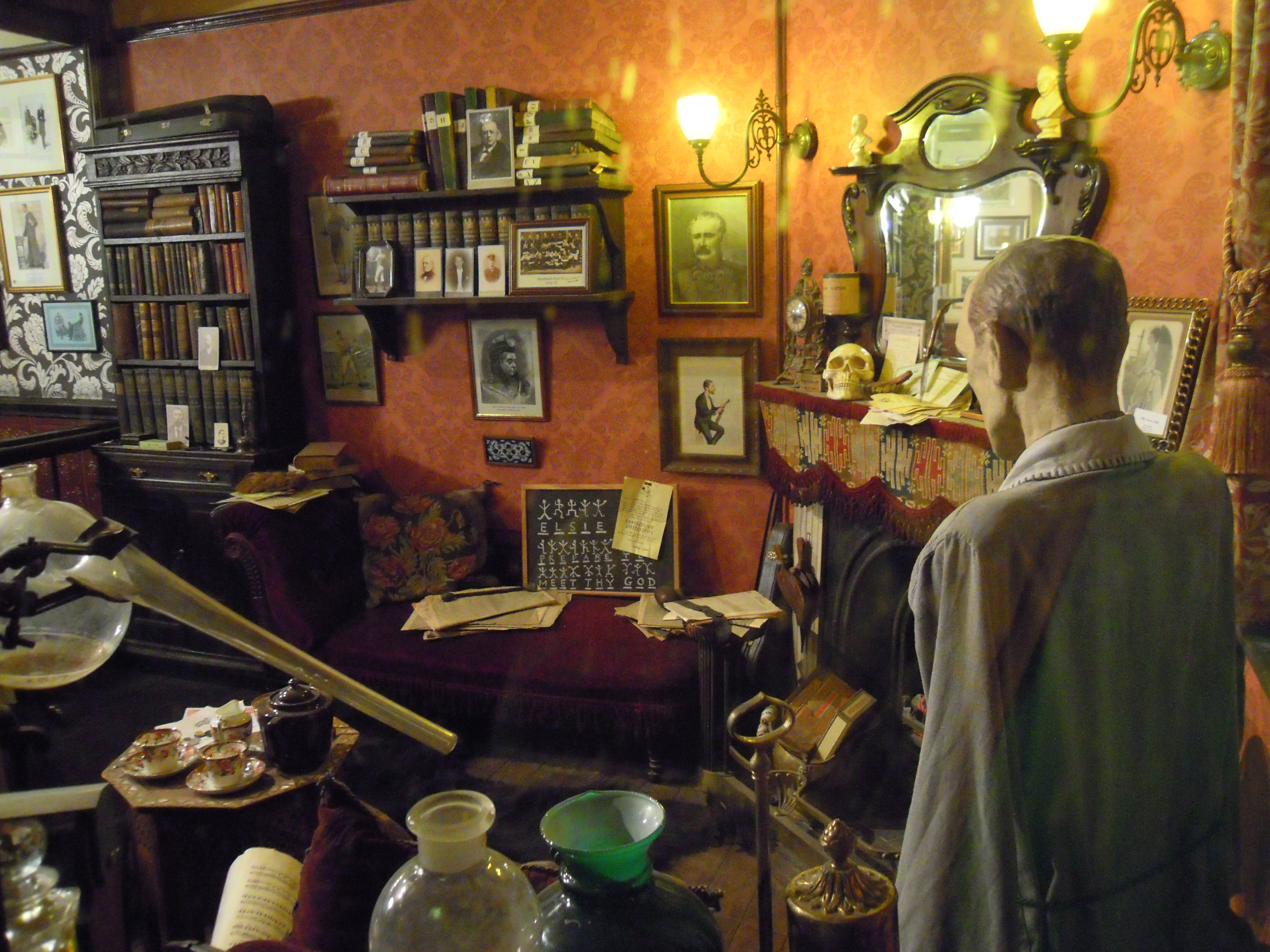
The sitting room of 221B Baker Street displayed at The Sherlock Holmes public house

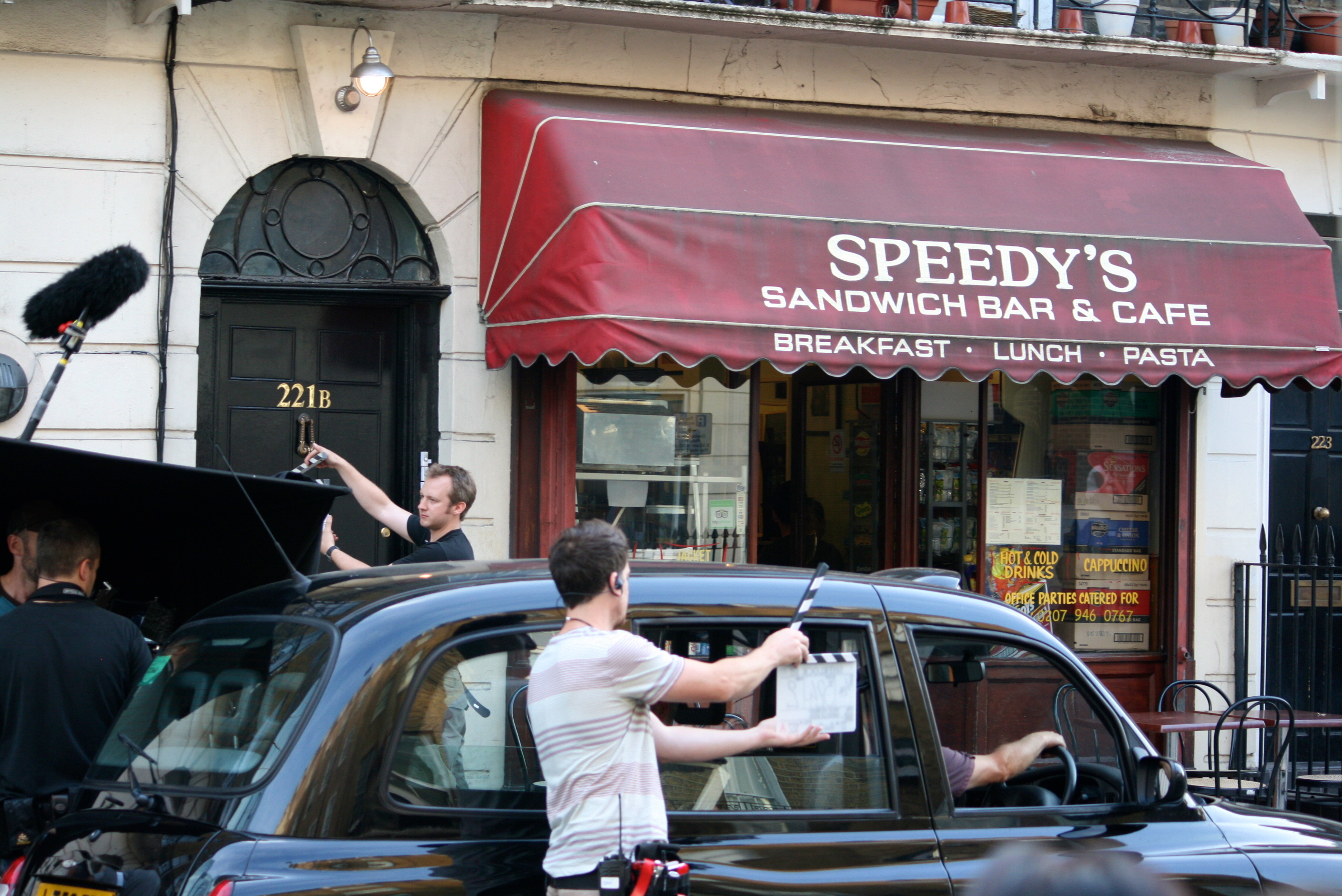
Shooting the "221B Baker Street" exterior in North Gower Street

The fictional address has been portrayed in the following pastiches of Sherlock Holmes:

- In the animated film The Great Mouse Detective (1986), based on the Basil of Baker Street book series, Basil resides in 221½ Baker Street, a mouse-hole beneath 221B Baker Street.
- Private detective Louie Knight moves into an office at 22/1B Stryd-y-Popty (which translates as Baker Street in Welsh) in Malcolm Pryce's Welsh Noir parody The Unbearable Lightness of Being in Aberystwyth.
- The 1987 CBS movie The Return of Sherlock Holmes (not to be confused with the 1986 British television series of the same name) features Holmes, cryogenically frozen in 1899 and awakened in modern times, trying to adapt with the aid of Watson's granddaughter, Jane. He seeks out his old residence and finds the spot occupied by a McDonald's franchise.
- Dr. Gregory House, the protagonist of House, M.D., lives at 221 Baker Street, Apartment B, Princeton, New Jersey.
- Danger Mouse, in the cartoon show of the same name, lives in a pillar box near 221b Baker Street. However, Danger Mouse is a loose parody of Danger Man and James Bond, rather than Sherlock Holmes. The pillar box is a stone's throw away from 221B Baker Street and Dr. Watson throws stones at them in apparent jealousy that he only works for the world's greatest detective, not the world's greatest secret agent in the episode "Where There's a Well, There's a Way".
- In the Phryne Fisher series by Kerry Greenwood, the detective Hon. Phryne Fisher resides at 221 The Esplanade, St Kilda (Melbourne, Australia), which she renumbers to 221B in homage to Holmes.
- In Star Trek: The Next Generation, Data tells another crew member that Geordi La Forge can be found at 221B Baker St, episode 29 "Elementary, Dear Data" (1988), and 221B Baker St. is again referenced in episode 137 "Ship in a Bottle" (1993).
- In the 2013 Season 2, Episode 1 of Elementary, Sherlock Holmes and Joan Watson visit London and stay in a second floor residence numbered 221B. Sherlock indicates he had happily resided there before his move to New York City. In season 7, Episode 1, Holmes, by then a wanted fugitive in the USA, is revealed to have relocated back to 221B Baker Street, whilst Watson occupied 221A.
- In the 2015 film Mr. Holmes, a long-retired Holmes (Ian McKellen) remarks that the Baker Street address is one of several fictitious details created by Watson, who wrote the cases up as sensationalist stories for publication. In a flashback, as curious onlookers gather outside 221B, Holmes watches from a window of his actual residence nearby and congratulates a client for finding the right address.
- The BBC Television series Sherlock has used 187 North Gower Street to represent 221B Baker Street for shooting the exterior scenes of Sherlock Holmes's flat. The location is near Euston railway station, and roughly a mile away from the real Baker Street.
- In the 2012–2015 Australian television series Miss Fisher's Murder Mysteries, the title character of The Honourable Phryne Fisher (Essie Davis) lives at 221B Baker Street in Melbourne, Victoria.
- In the Lord Peter Wimsey stories by Dorothy L Sayers, the title character lives at 110A Piccadilly.
- In the video game Identity V, 221B Baker Street appears as a purchasable room as part of a collaboration with the Conan Doyle Estate.

== See also ==
- The Sherlock Holmes, a Victorian-era-themed public house in Northumberland Street, London, with another recreation of the 221B Baker Street interior.
