= North Wembley =

Coordinates: 51.5560°N 0.3042°W

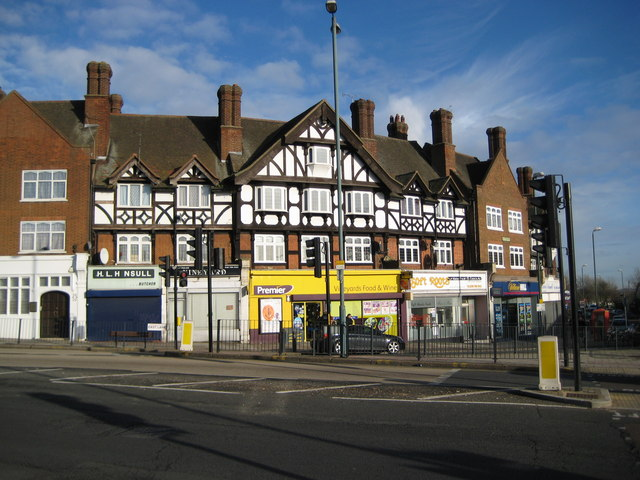
- Court Parade in mock tudor styling, at the junction of Watford Road and East Lane

- Location within Greater London
- OS grid reference: TQ175855
- London borough: Brent
- Ceremonial county: Greater London
- Region: London
- Country: England
- Sovereign state: United Kingdom
- Post town: WEMBLEY
- Postcode district: HA0, HA9
- Post town: HARROW
- Postcode district: HA1
- Dialling code: 020
- Police: Metropolitan
- Fire: London
- Ambulance: London
- UK Parliament: Brent West
- London Assembly: Brent and Harrow

North Wembley is a locality in Wembley in the north-west of London, England. It is located in the London Borough of Brent, close to the London Borough of Harrow boundary. It is mostly made up of the 1930s Sudbury Court Estate. North Wembley forms the north-western part of the town of that is its namesake. The major roads in the area are East Lane, Watford Road, and Sudbury Court Drive. Most of it is part of the Wembley HA0 postcode area, but a small part in the east (including East Lane Business Park) falls under Wembley HA9, and parts in the west (including Sudbury Court Drive) fall under Harrow HA1.

== History ==
Sudbury Court Estate was built between circa 1927 to 1935, one of the best surviving mock tudor housing in the wider area. The estate was built under Captain Edward George Spencer-Churchill, first cousin of Winston Churchill. The name of the estate is derived from the principal farm in the area, Sudbury Court Farm, which stood in Sudbury Court Road until its demolition in 1957. The farm was one of the most important on the estate of Lord Northwick and comprised 380 acres. It was here that for a while the Manor Courts were held, hence the name.

=== Sudbury Court Residents Association ===
In 1930, during the construction of Sudbury Court Estate and the nearby Pebworth Estate, the local people created the Sudbury Court Residents Association (SCRA) which is one of the oldest community associations in the United Kingdom. In May 1931, the first issue of the community magazine was published named 'The Estate Courier'. Over the years the format of the Estate’s own news-sheet has changed but it has never stopped publishing. This first issue was printed on both sides of a folded sheet of paper. During the Second World War, the named changed to 'The Courier' (omitting the 'Estate' in the title). By March 1967 The Courier had become a 12 page booklet, supported in no small measure by advertising. As of 2024, most issues are around 30 pages in length.

== Geography and Demography ==
To the north, the Watford Road leads to Harrow; to its west is Sudbury Hill and Harrow on the Hill; to the south is Sudbury and Wembley proper; and to the east is Wembley Park. Due to proximity with Sudbury, certain areas of North Wembley are referred to as being a part of Sudbury. Nearby is Northwick Park Hospital and The Clementine Churchill Hospital.

North Wembley on average is home to a richer population than Wembley Central but the part of district that is within the Preston ward (and thus not in the Sudbury Court Estate) has a few small council estates, blocks and many working-class people.

Along East Lane, an east–west street which run through the neighbourhood, is Wembley High secondary school, as well as a small selection of shops. It also contains East Lane Business Park which contains numerous skill labourers and office spaces; adjacent to that area is Hirst Crescent which is a collection low-rise flats stretching into Preston. The district is home to many ethnicities, with a significant Indian community in North Wembley as well as a smaller black population with Afro-Caribbeans being larger than African, and also an elderly White British population.

North Wembley has a leisure centre called Vale Farm, as well as a relatively large sports ground adjacent to it. North Wembley also provides the only vehicular access directly into Northwick Park.

== Transport ==
North Wembley station is on the Bakerloo line for London Underground services and the Lioness line for London Overground services, but for many residents, depending where they live, either South Kenton station, Sudbury Hill Harrow station or Sudbury & Harrow Road station could be nearer.

London Buses routes 182, 245 and 483 (and night route N18) serve North Wembley, providing links to Wembley town centre, Sudbury, Harrow and Wembley Park. In addition, routes 92 and H17 pass by the very western end at Sudbury Court Drive; and route 223 passes by across the rail tracks by South Kenton station.

== Schools ==
- Wembley High Technology College

== Gallery ==
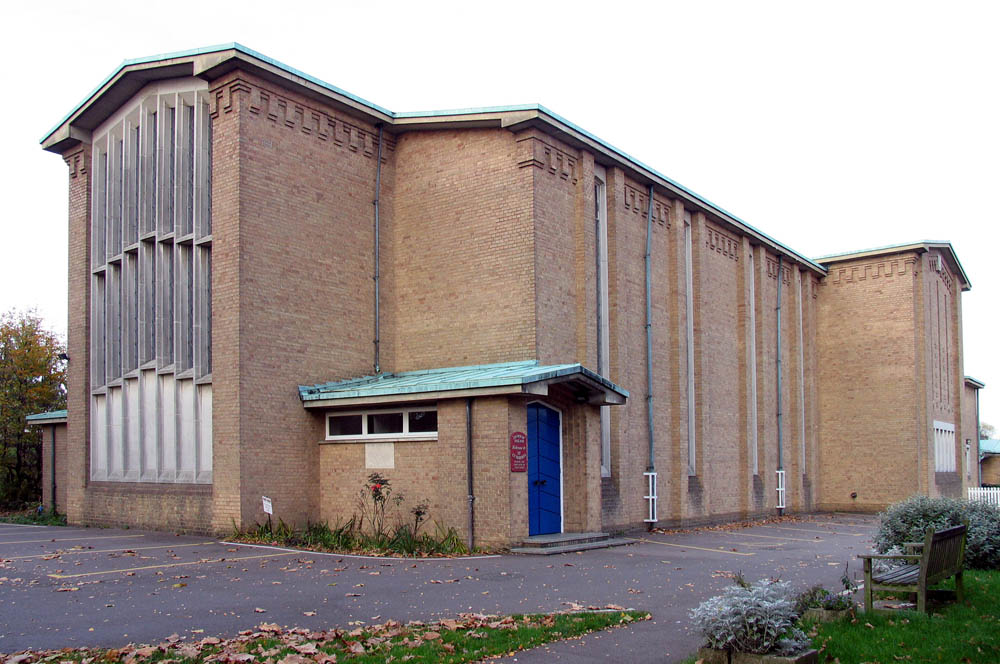
St Cuthbert church, Watford Road

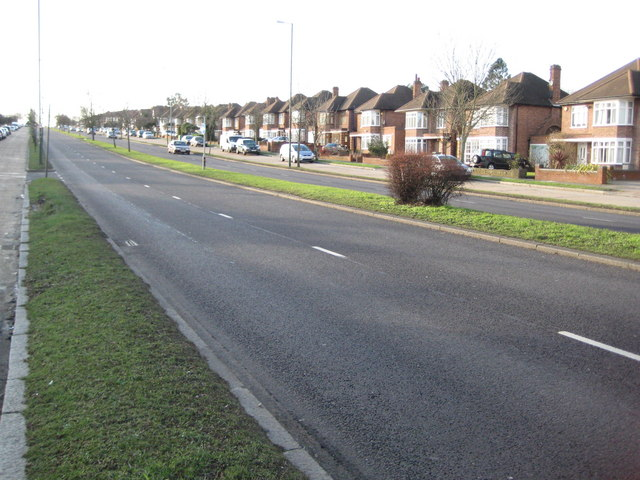
Sudbury Court Drive, a 500 yd diagonal dual carriageway

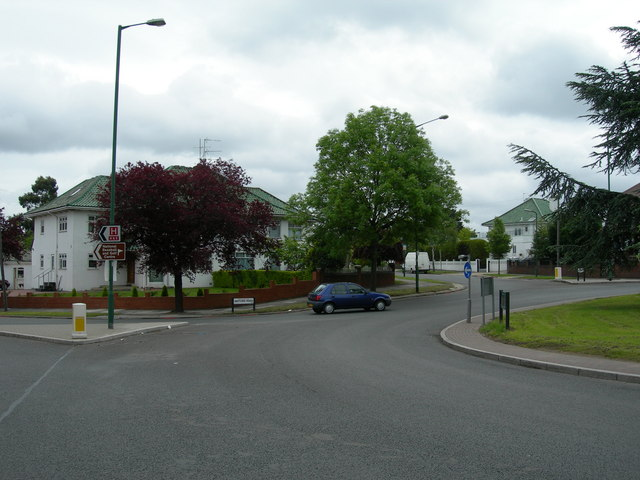
John Lyon roundabout, junction of Watford Road and Sudbury Court Drive

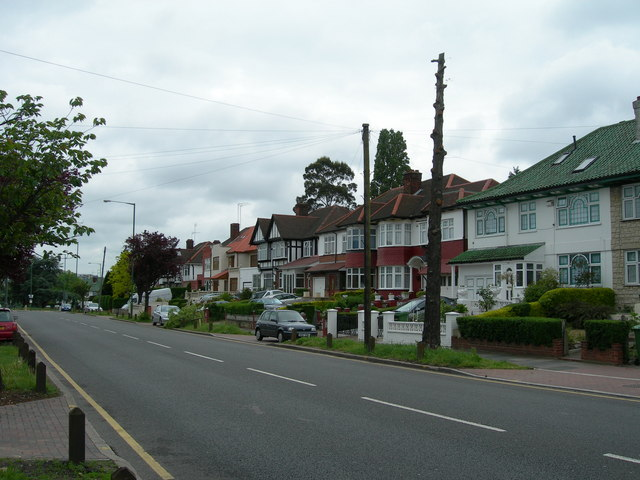
Large semi-detached houses in Watford Road

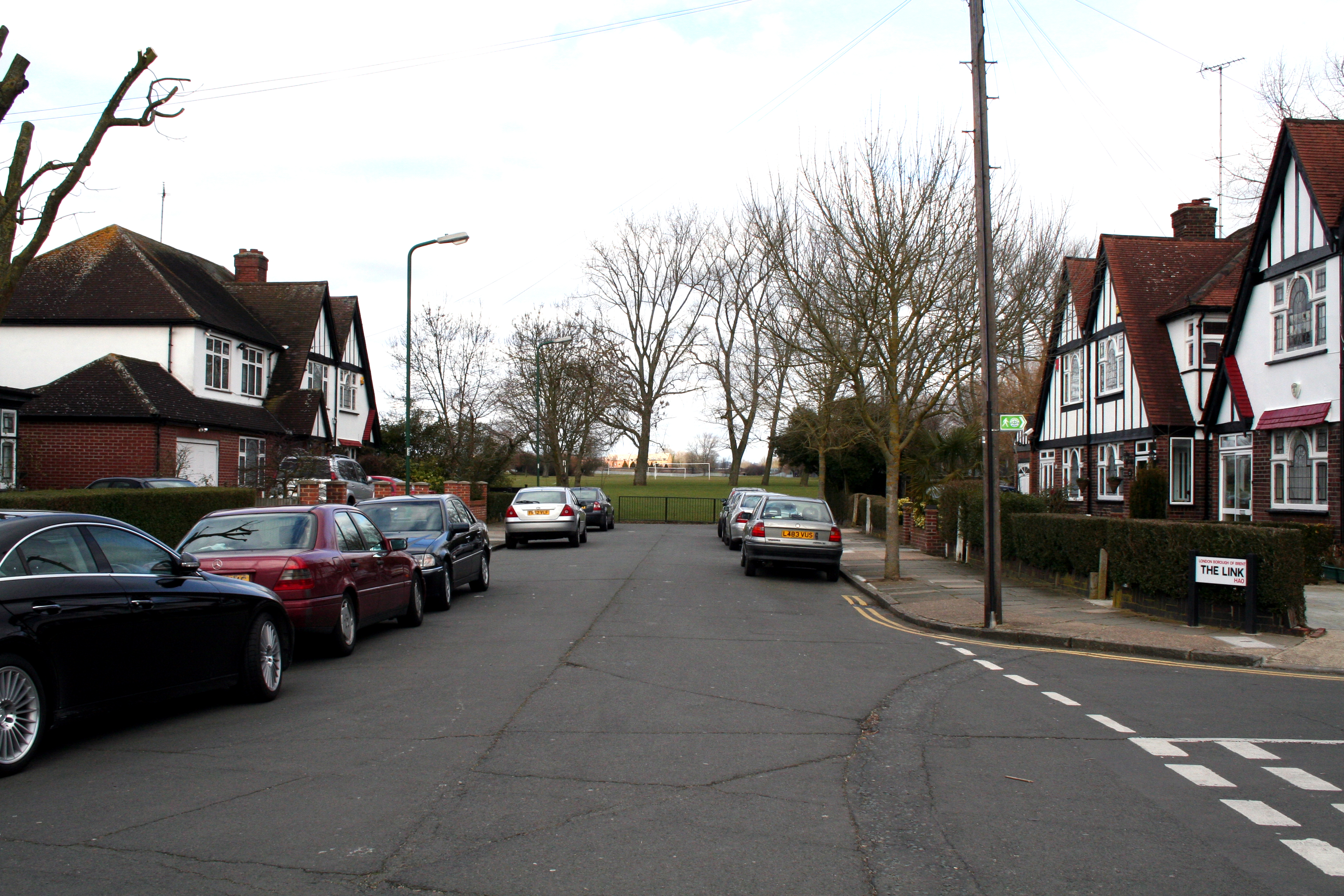
Entrance to Northwick Park from Nathans Road - to the right is a little footpath that leads to South Kenton station and Windermere Avenue in Kenton

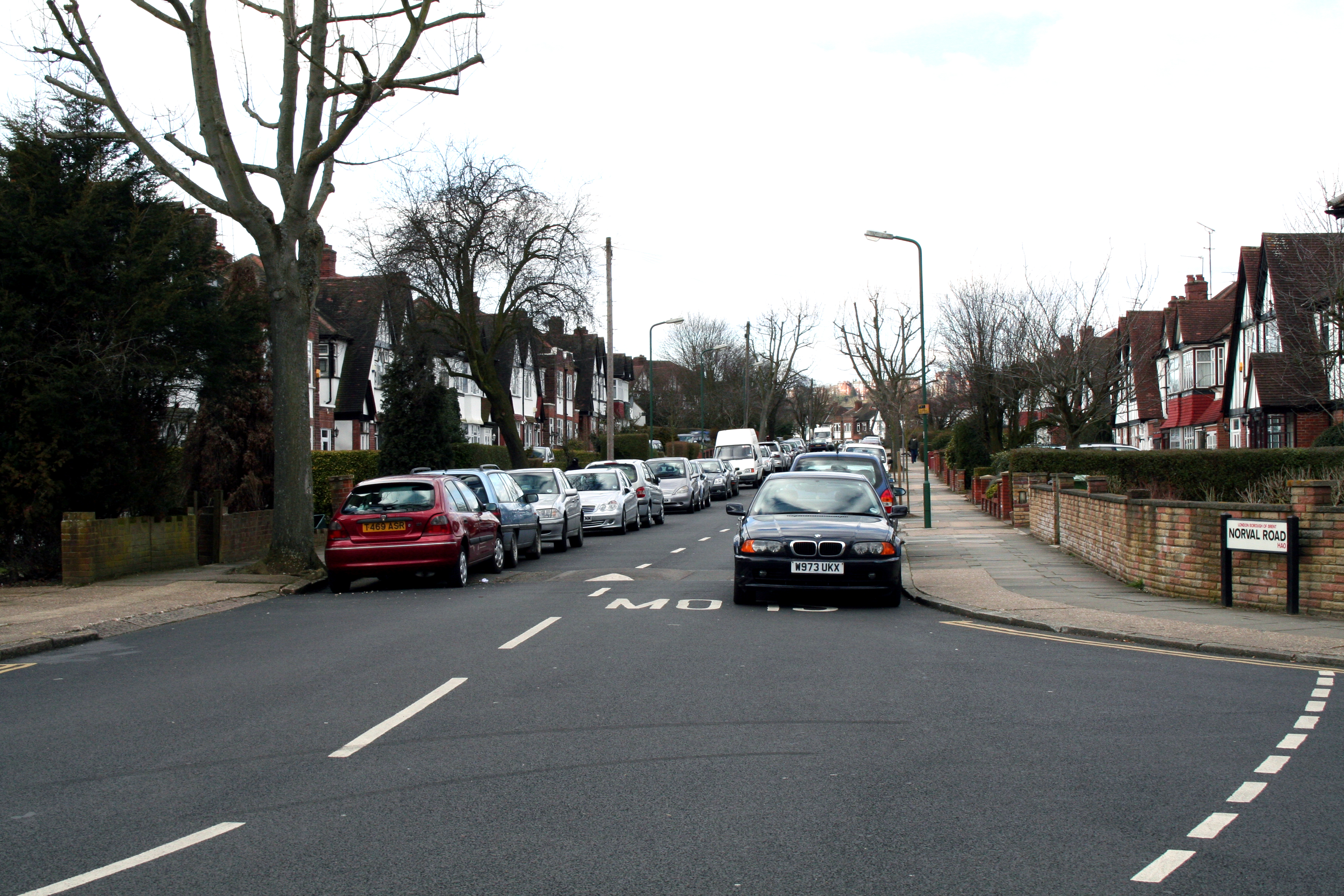
Norval Road
