= South Kenton station =

London Underground and railway station

South Kenton
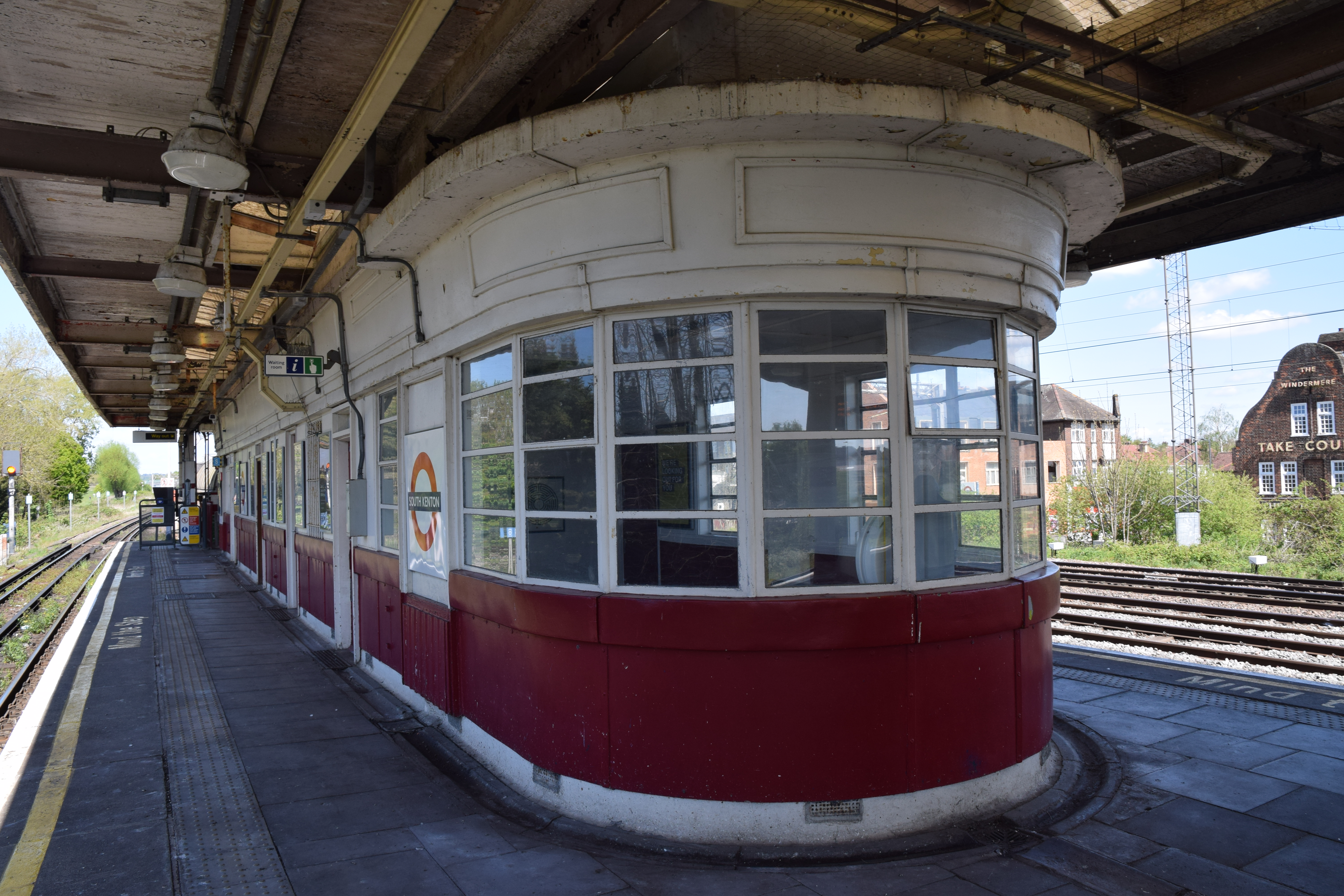
- Station platform
- Interactive map of South Kenton

General information
- Location: Kenton
- Local authority: London Borough of Brent
- Managed by: London Underground
- Owner: Network Rail
- Station code: SOK
- DfT category: E
- Number of platforms: 2
- Fare zone: 4

London Underground annual entry and exit
- 2021: ▼0.63 million
- 2022: ▲1.01 million
- 2023: ▼0.82 million
- 2024: ▲0.95 million
- 2025: ▼0.90 million

National Rail annual entry and exit
- 2020–21: ▼0.214 million
- 2021–22: ▲0.419 million
- 2022–23: ▲0.502 million
- 2023–24: ▲0.555 million
- 2024–25: ▲0.643 million

Key dates
- 3 July 1933: Opened

Other information
- External links: TfL station info page; Departures; Facilities
- Coordinates: 51.5708°N 0.3087°W

South Kenton is a station in Kenton, north-west London. It is on the Bakerloo line of the London Underground and the Lioness line of the London Overground, between Kenton and North Wembley stations. It is located between The Link in the Sudbury Court Estate of North Wembley, and Windermere Grove in Kenton, in the Wembley postal area. it is in London fare zone 4.

== History ==
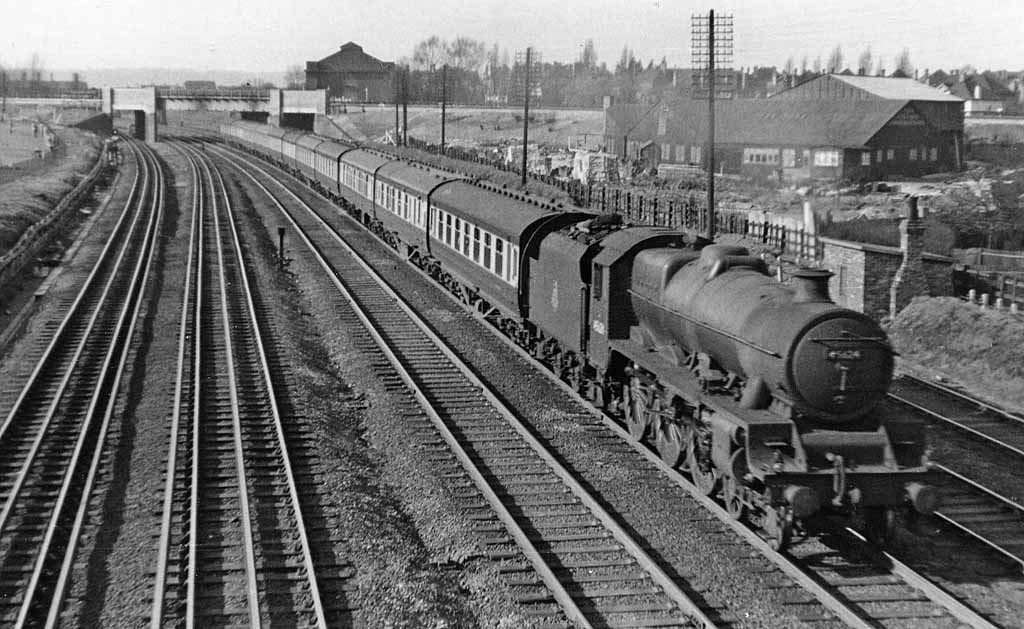
West Coast Main Line south of Kenton in 1955

The station opened on 3 July 1933 with access from both sides of the railway via a footbridge to the single island platform serving only the Watford DC line; this footbridge (which started at the bottom of the embankment) was later replaced by a pedestrian tunnel, cutting out a long climb for passengers entering the station. The station, designed by the architect William Henry Hamlyn, was built in a more modern "concrete and glass" style construction including a "streamlined" waiting room rather than the brick and woodwork LNWR stations elsewhere on the DC line.

== The station today ==
The station is an island platform and Bakerloo line train doors are not level with it. Therefore, there is a downward step to the train from the platform. The ticket office is at platform level and occupies the north end of the streamlined 1933 building. It is one of the three stations served by London Underground which has no ticket gates and due to the restrictive layout here there are no plans for these to be installed in the immediate future. There is no wheelchair access.

== Services ==
There are four trains per hour on the Bakerloo line of the London Underground heading southbound to Elephant & Castle in Central London and northbound to Harrow & Wealdstone in the north-west.

There are also four trains per hour on the Lioness line of the London Overground to London Euston southbound and to Watford Junction northbound.

Preceding station	London Overground	Following station
Kenton towards Watford Junction	Lioness line Watford DC line	North Wembley towards Euston
Preceding station	London Underground	Following station
Kenton towards Harrow & Wealdstone	Bakerloo line	North Wembley towards Elephant & Castle

== Connections ==
London Buses route 223 serve the station.

== See also ==
- The Windermere, South Kenton - historic pub at entrance
