= Wembley tube station =

Wembley tube station could refer to one of a number of London Underground stations serving the Wembley area of north London:

- Wembley Park
- Wembley Central
- North Wembley
