= Northwick Park tube station =

London Underground station

Northwick Park
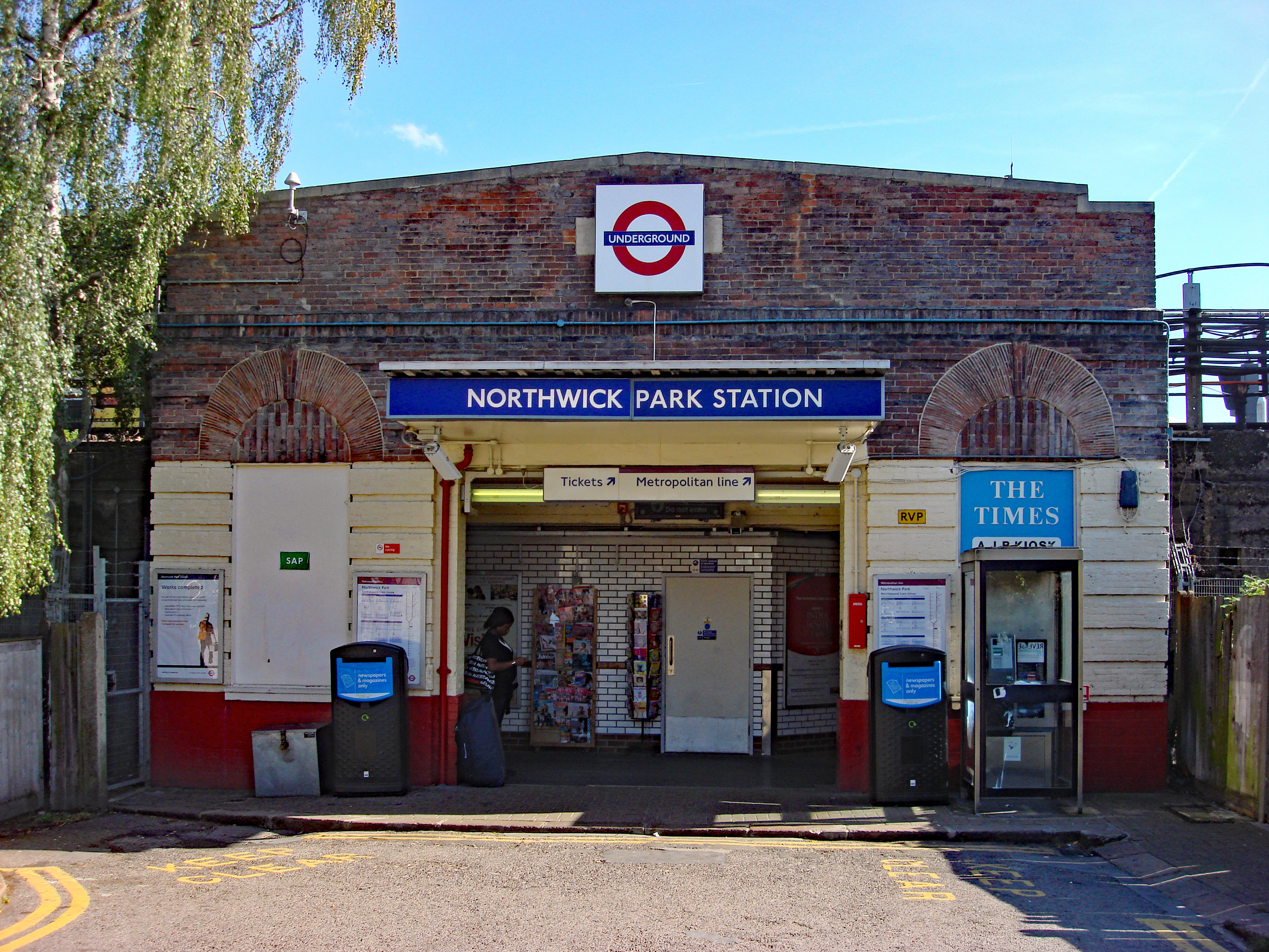
- Main station entrance
- Interactive map of Northwick Park

General information
- Location: Kenton
- Local authority: London Borough of Brent
- Managed by: London Underground
- Number of platforms: 2
- Fare zone: 4
- OSI: Kenton

London Underground annual entry and exit
- 2020: ▼2.43 million
- 2021: ▼1.84 million
- 2022: ▲3.17 million
- 2023: ▲3.35 million
- 2024: ▼3.22 million

Key dates
- 2 August 1880: Metropolitan Railway passes through here en route to Harrow
- 19 July 1908: Line electrified
- 28 June 1923: Opened as "Northwick Park and Kenton"
- 15 March 1937: Renamed "Northwick Park"

Other information
- External links: TfL station info page
- Coordinates: 51°34′43″N 0°19′07″W

Northwick Park is a London Underground station in Kenton in the London Borough of Brent on the Metropolitan line. It lies between Harrow-on-the-Hill and Preston Road stations and is located in London fare zone 4. The station takes its name from the nearby public park, Northwick Park.

It is close to Northwick Park Hospital and the Harrow campus of the University of Westminster. Kenton station, served by the Bakerloo line and the Lioness line of the London Overground, is within walking distance. There is an official out-of-station interchange between these two stations.

On the island platform, there is one of the few surviving K8 telephone kiosks. Now used for the TfL internal system, the kiosk is Grade II listed

== Services ==
It is served by "all stations" trains only (northbound fast and semi-fast trains do not stop at stations between Wembley Park and Harrow-on-the-Hill). It takes an average time of 20 minutes from Baker Street.

The off-peak service in trains per hour (tph) is:

- 2tph Northbound to Amersham (all stations)
- 2tph Northbound to Chesham (all stations)
- 8tph Northbound to Uxbridge (all stations)
- 4tph Northbound to Watford (all stations)
- 4tph Southbound to Baker Street (all stations)
- 12tph Southbound to Aldgate via Baker Street (all stations)

The peak time service in trains per hour (tph) is:

- 2tph Northbound (morning peak only) to Amersham (all stations)
- 2tph Northbound (morning peak only) to Chesham (all stations)
- 10tph Northbound to Uxbridge (all stations)
- 4tph Southbound to Baker Street (all stations)
- 12tph Southbound to Aldgate via Baker Street (all stations)

Note that during evening peaks, services to Amersham or Chesham from Northwick Park or Preston Road require a change at Harrow-On-The-Hill.

During the morning peak (06:30 to 09:30), fast services from Amersham and Chesham run non-stop southbound only between Moor Park, Harrow-On-The-Hill and Finchley Road whilst semi-fast services from Watford and Uxbridge run non-stop southbound only between Harrow-On-The-Hill and Finchley Road. During the evening peak (16:30-19:30), fast and semi-fast services, which operate northbound only, call additionally at Wembley Park.

Preceding station	London Underground	Following station
Harrow-on-the-Hill towards Watford, Chesham, Amersham or Uxbridge	Metropolitan line	Preston Road towards Baker Street or Aldgate

== Connections ==
London Buses routes H18 and H19 serve the station.
