= North Wembley station =

London Underground and London Overground station

North Wembley
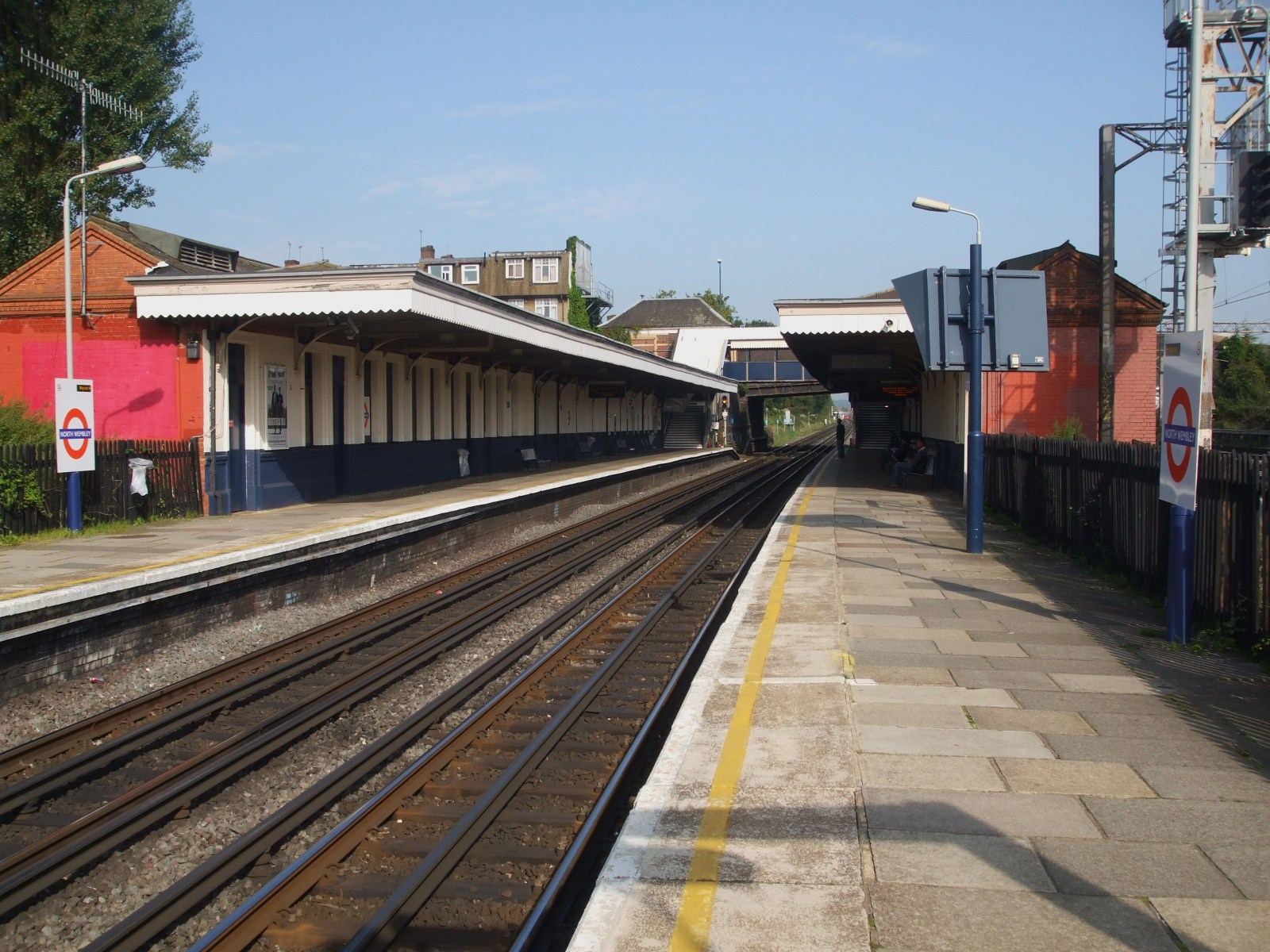
- Southbound platform at the station
- Interactive map of North Wembley

General information
- Location: North Wembley
- Local authority: London Borough of Brent
- Managed by: London Underground Limited
- Owner: Network Rail
- Station code: NWB
- DfT category: E
- Number of platforms: 2
- Tracks: 6
- Fare zone: 4

London Underground annual entry and exit
- 2020: ▼1.23 million
- 2021: ▼0.78 million
- 2022: ▲1.20 million
- 2023: ▲1.30 million
- 2024: ▲1.39 million

National Rail annual entry and exit
- 2020–21: ▼0.431 million
- 2021–22: ▲0.812 million
- 2022–23: ▲0.943 million
- 2023–24: ▲1.049 million
- 2024–25: ▲1.231 million

Key dates
- 15 June 1912: Opened

Other information
- External links: TfL station info page; Departures; Facilities
- Coordinates: 51.5627°N 0.3040°W

North Wembley is an interchange station in North Wembley, north-west London. It is on the Bakerloo line of the London Underground and the Lioness line of the London Overground, between South Kenton and Wembley Central stations. The station is located on the south side of East Lane, part of the London Borough of Brent, serving residents of North Wembley and western parts of Wembley Park. It is in London fare zone 4.

== History ==
The station was first opened by the London and North Western Railway on 15 June 1912 as part of the New Line between Euston and Watford Junction; LER Bakerloo line services began on 16 April 1917. Originally to be called East Lane, after the road passing over the railway at this location, it was named North Wembley from opening. It was built to the same general design as the other new stations on the same line and the layout at North Wembley station makes it almost identical to Kenton two stops to the north. Ticket gates and departure boards were recently installed at this station.

== Services ==
Platform 1 for southbound services:

- Services to London Euston operated by London Overground (Lioness line) – approximately every 15 minutes
- Services to Elephant & Castle operated by London Underground (Bakerloo line) – every 15 minutes

Platform 2 for northbound services:

- Services to Watford Junction operated by London Overground (Lioness line) – approximately every 15 minutes
- Services to Harrow & Wealdstone operated by London Underground (Bakerloo line) – every 15 minutes

Preceding station	London Overground	Following station
South Kenton towards Watford Junction	Lioness line Watford DC line	Wembley Central towards Euston
Preceding station	London Underground	Following station
South Kenton towards Harrow & Wealdstone	Bakerloo line	Wembley Central towards Elephant & Castle

== Connections ==
London Buses route 245 and London Buses route 483 serve the station.
