= Ken Simmons =

British ornithologist

Kenneth Edwin Laurence Ryder Simmons
- Born: 29 March 1929; Kenton, Middlesex, England
- Died: 25 February 2002 (aged 72)
- Occupations: Teacher; Ornithologist

Kenneth Edwin Laurence Ryder Simmons (29 March 1929 – 25 February 2002) was a respected British ornithologist born in Kenton, Middlesex. He spent his early childhood in China and went to school in London, Wiltshire and Worcestershire. He completed professional training for a Teachers’ Certificate in 1946/7 and then took up a teaching post in Reading. It was at this time that he took up serious birdwatching and joined the British Ornithologists' Union, the Royal Society for the Protection of Birds and, a year later, the British Trust for Ornithology. During a period of National Service from 1948-50 Simmons was posted to the Suez Canal Zone, Egypt where his observations of birds provided material for later published work. From 1947 onwards he published many notes and papers on birds. He became particularly interested in the taxonomic implications of certain simple behaviour patterns and in bird taxonomy generally and was listed in the 1961 Directory of Zoological Taxonomists. He was also a committee member, joint recorder and Chairman of the Reading Ornithological Club.

In February 1962 he moved to Ascension Island, as the island School Master, with his wife Marion as his assistant. Although he had intended to spend his spare time on the island writing, he ended spending most of it observing and studying the brown booby Sula leucogaster. Upon their return to England in 1964 both Ken and Marion decided to give up teaching and Ken succeeded in obtaining a Leverhulme Fellowship enabling him to register, in 1965, as a postgraduate student at the Department of Psychology, University of Bristol. In 1967 he was awarded an MSc for his Ascension Island booby studies and in 1970 a PhD for work on the great crested grebe. Simmons' work was widely cited in ornithological circles. While in Bristol he was a founding committee member of the Bristol Ornithological Club.

Following his PhD he moved to Leicester to work with Uli Weidmann at the Department of Psychology, University of Leicester on duck courtship. He was also asked to join the Editorial Board of The Birds of the Western Palearctic. He started work on the Social Pattern and Behaviour section in late 1971, in 1973 he became editor, reducing the hours worked at the University of Leicester, then in 1975 SRC funding allowed him to work full-time on The Birds of the Western Palearctic. He was responsible for the Voice section, the Family Summaries and general trouble shooting. He also spent time writing papers and books and biographical study of Edmund Selous.
