= Sudbury, London =

Suburb in London, England

Coordinates: 51.5537°N 0.3199°W

Sudbury
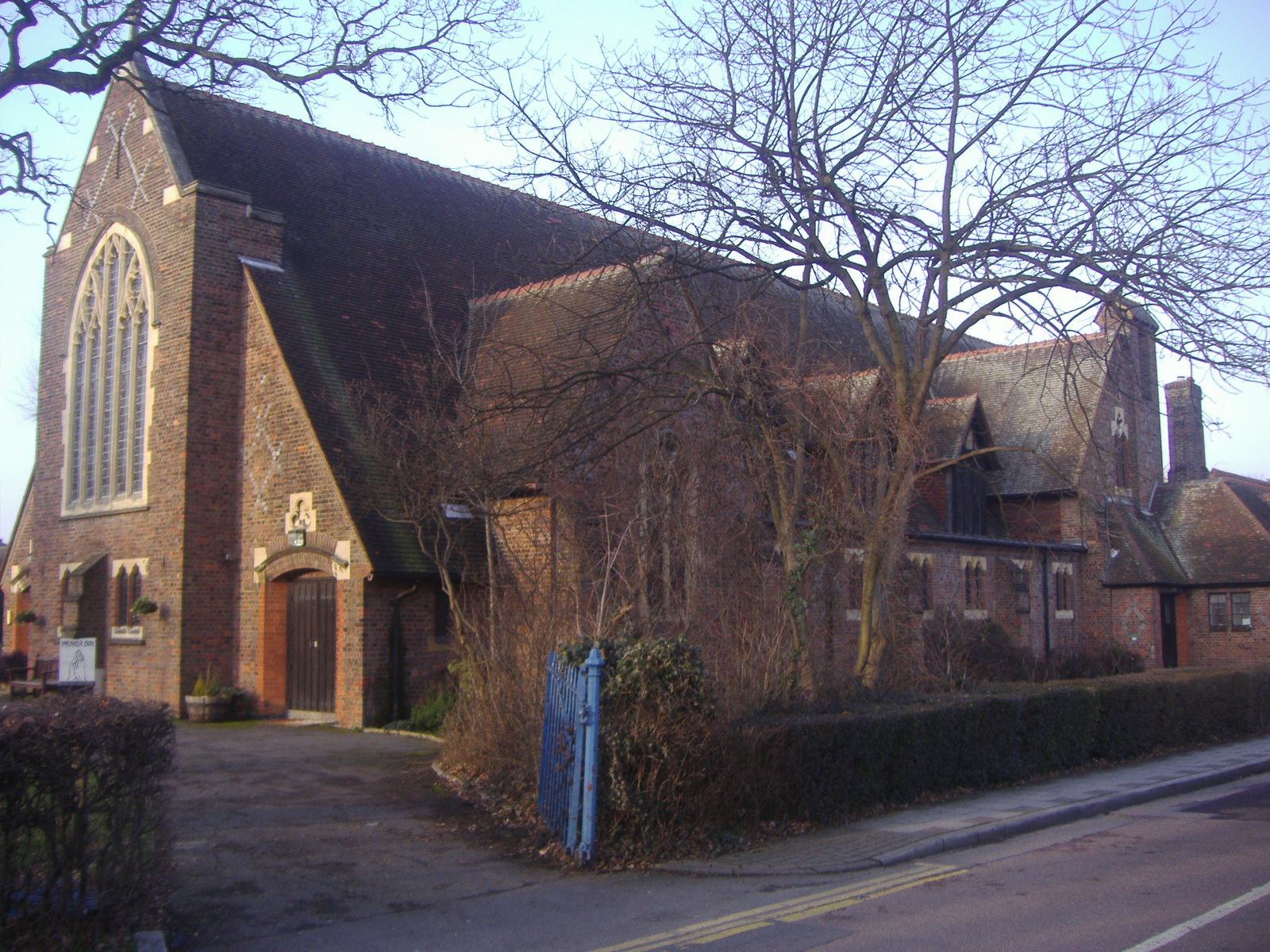
- St Andrew's Church

- Location within Greater London
- Population: 14,950 (2011 Census. Ward)
- OS grid reference: TQ165852
- London borough: Brent
- Ceremonial county: Greater London
- Region: London
- Country: England
- Sovereign state: United Kingdom
- Post town: WEMBLEY
- Postcode district: HA0
- Post town: HARROW
- Postcode district: HA1
- Dialling code: 020
- Police: Metropolitan
- Fire: London
- Ambulance: London
- UK Parliament: Brent West
- London Assembly: Brent and Harrow

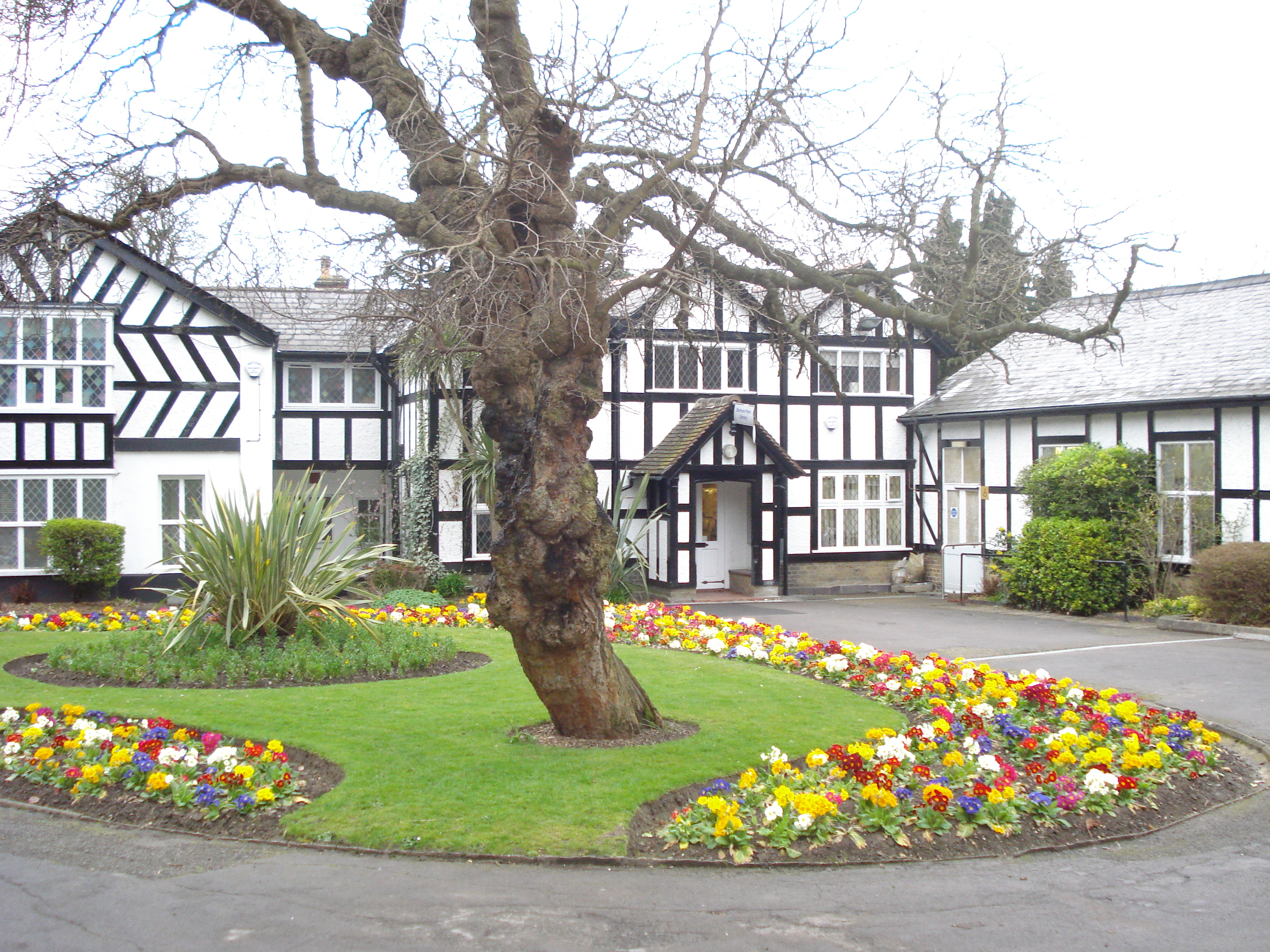
Crabbs House, Barham Park

Sudbury (/ˈsʌdbəri/) is a suburb straddling the London Boroughs of Brent, Harrow, and Ealing; located in northwest London, United Kingdom. The suburb forms the western part of Wembley and is centred around 0.6 miles (1 km) west of Wembley Central railway station.

Today, Sudbury covers a narrow area with Wembley to its east, North Wembley to its north, Sudbury Hill to the west, and North Greenford, in the London Borough of Ealing, directly south. Its section in the borough of Harrow is around Sudbury Court Drive, which is technically located within the contiguous North Wembley. It is historically in the County of Middlesex.

Sudbury is a historical area, having once extended from the 'South Manor - Sudbury' (thought to have been on Harrow Hill) to the area that is now known as Wembley Central. Much of the land that once formed Sudbury Common until the 1930s has now been developed as a relatively green residential suburb of London. Much of Sudbury was once in the ownership of the Barham family, who give their name to a number of local landmarks, including Barham School and Barham Park.

== History ==
=== Early history ===
Sudbury, in the parish of Harrow, was in the Hundred of Gore in the historic County of Middlesex, and was one of ten hamlets which formed the larger of the Archbishop of Canterbury's two Harrow manors. The road to London and the proximity of Harrow School enhanced its status. Its upkeep was supported in part by Sir John Lyon, founder of Harrow School. In 1842, main train station, Sudbury station opened. On 1 May 1882, the station was renamed to "Sudbury and Wembley". Later, in 1910, "Sudbury and Wembley" was renamed to "Wembley for Sudbury". Finally, in 1948, the station was renamed to "Wembley Central" and it has remained "Wembley Central" ever since.

=== Georgian era ===
Wealthy sisters and local philanthropists the Copland Sisters after which many local landmarks from streets to schools were named commissioned Sir George Gilbert Scott, the architect who later designed the Albert Memorial and St Pancras station, to build the Church of St John in 1846 which marks the easterly extent of Sudbury. Opposite is Copland House, now a home for the elderly. The Coplands built Sudbury Lodge in the grounds of their father's home in Crabbs House.

This would later change hands and be owned by another wealthy and philanthropic family; the Barhams. During the late Georgian period Sudbury was the home of the Express Dairy Company Limited run by the Barham Family. It was the first British Dairy to use glass milk bottles, the first to use milk churns and glass lined tanks to carry 30 0000 gallons of milk by train into London every night and one of the first to introduce pasteurisation to sterilise milk. It even supplied milk to Queen Victoria. For his services the owner and managing director George Barham Sr. was knighted in 1904. He died in 1913 leaving his business to his son Titus Barham.

=== Nineteenth century to modern times ===
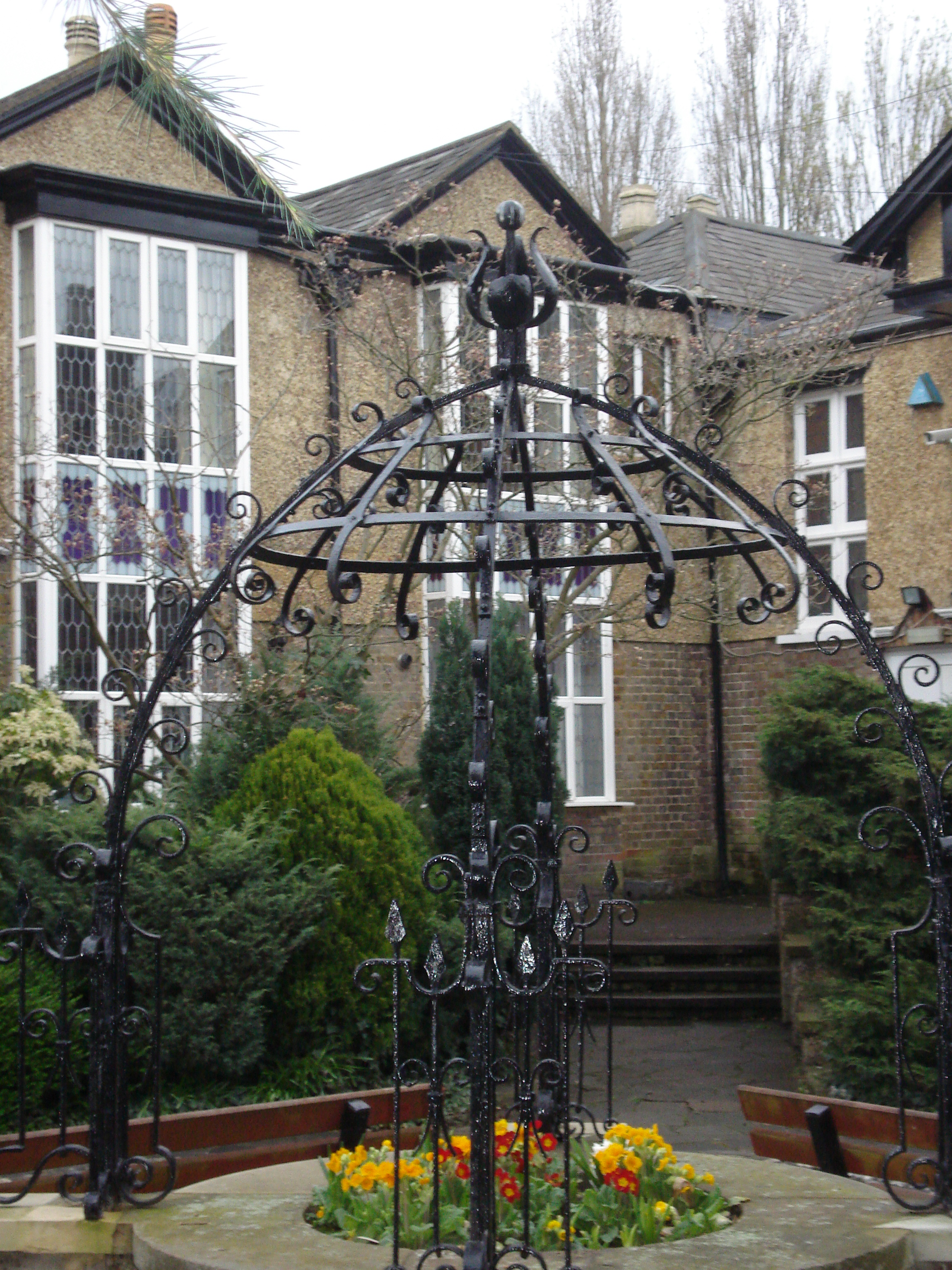
Jubilee Gardens

Titus Barham died aged 77 years in 1937. On the day of his death he had been due to be made the first Mayor of the new ward. He left considerable lands for the benefit of the public in this rural area. His former mansion in Barham Park was demolished in 1956. Much of the area originally given over to arable land for use by dairy herds was lost during the interwar period.

Urbanisation began in earnest in the late 19th century with the arrival of the railways. Sudbury town became part of the London commuter belt. The demand for housing was such that within the short interwar period much of the area became urbanised. Despite this it remains a relatively green area mainly due to strict planning control. In 1928 land was given over for the Vale Farm sports fields. There has been a swimming pool on the site since 1932.

== Parks and recreation ==
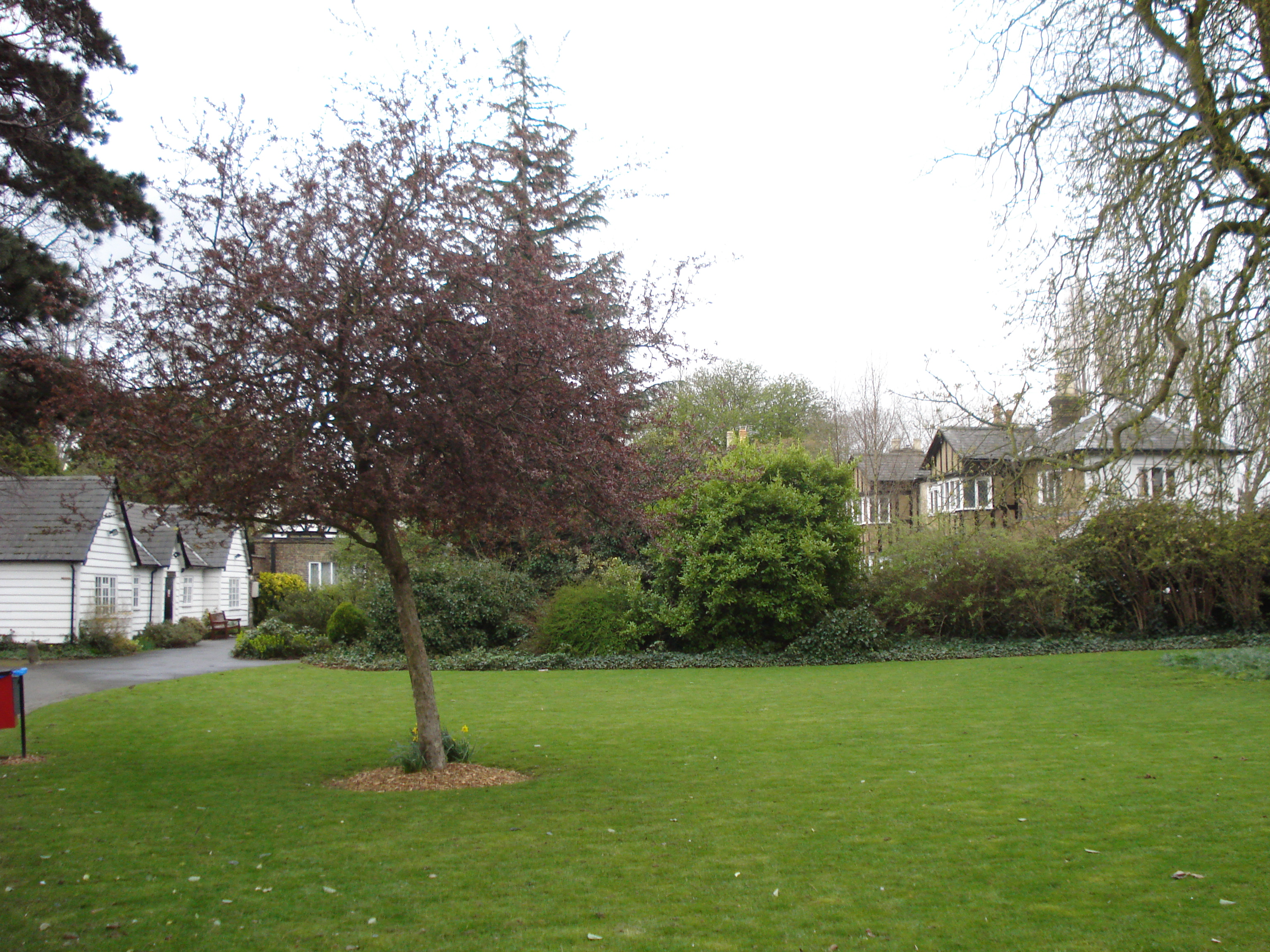
Barham Park

Barham Park is a landscaped garden dating from the 18th century. The foundations of Sudbury Lodge, formerly the home of George Barham, founder of Express Dairies, still stand amidst his walled gardens. Also in the park is a surviving Georgian building, formerly Crabb's House, which is now used as a library. The park has a floral display, three ponds, a conifer plantation, a large and modern children's play area, and a war memorial.

== Sport ==
Sudbury was the former home of London Wasps rugby union team who moved there in 1923. During the late nineties they relocated to Loftus Road to share with QPR before moving to Buckinghamshire in 2001, and subsequently Coventry in 2014, and the ground at Sudbury Town has been developed for housing. The club house still stands and is still considered the club's spiritual home. A large swimming pool, outdoor tennis courts, cricket pitches and nets, AstroTurf pitches and a sports complex are located at Vale Farm. The complex is also the home ground of Wembley F.C., and contains a stadium with a 2,000 seat capacity. Other sports clubs in the district include Sudbury Golf Club, Sudbury Squash and Tennis Club, and Sudbury Court Running Club.

The Lyons' Sports Club hosted the field hockey preliminaries for the 1948 Summer Olympics.

Sudbury Court Rugby Club played at the pavilion on East Lane.

The rugby section was formed by the original Sudbury sports club on November 9th 1958.

== Historical buildings ==
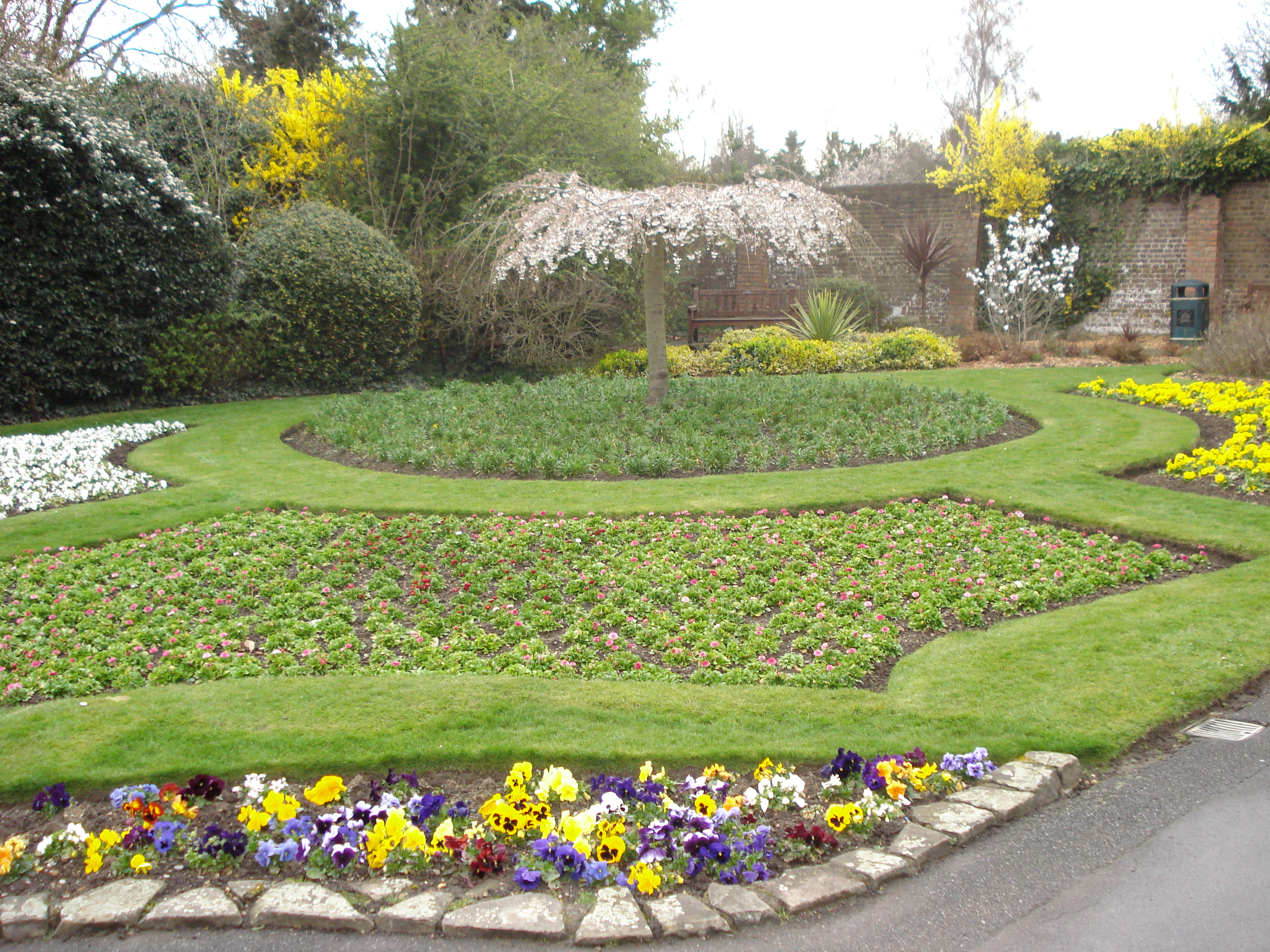
Walled Garden, Barham Park

In the 19th century Sudbury was a large meadow stretching from Wembley to Harrow Hill. It was dotted by many farm houses and grand residences. A few buildings from this era still remain and a notable example is Hundred Elms Farm of Elms Lane to the North of Sudbury Town. Now a residential care home, the actual building is well maintained but is not open to the public.

== Religious buildings ==
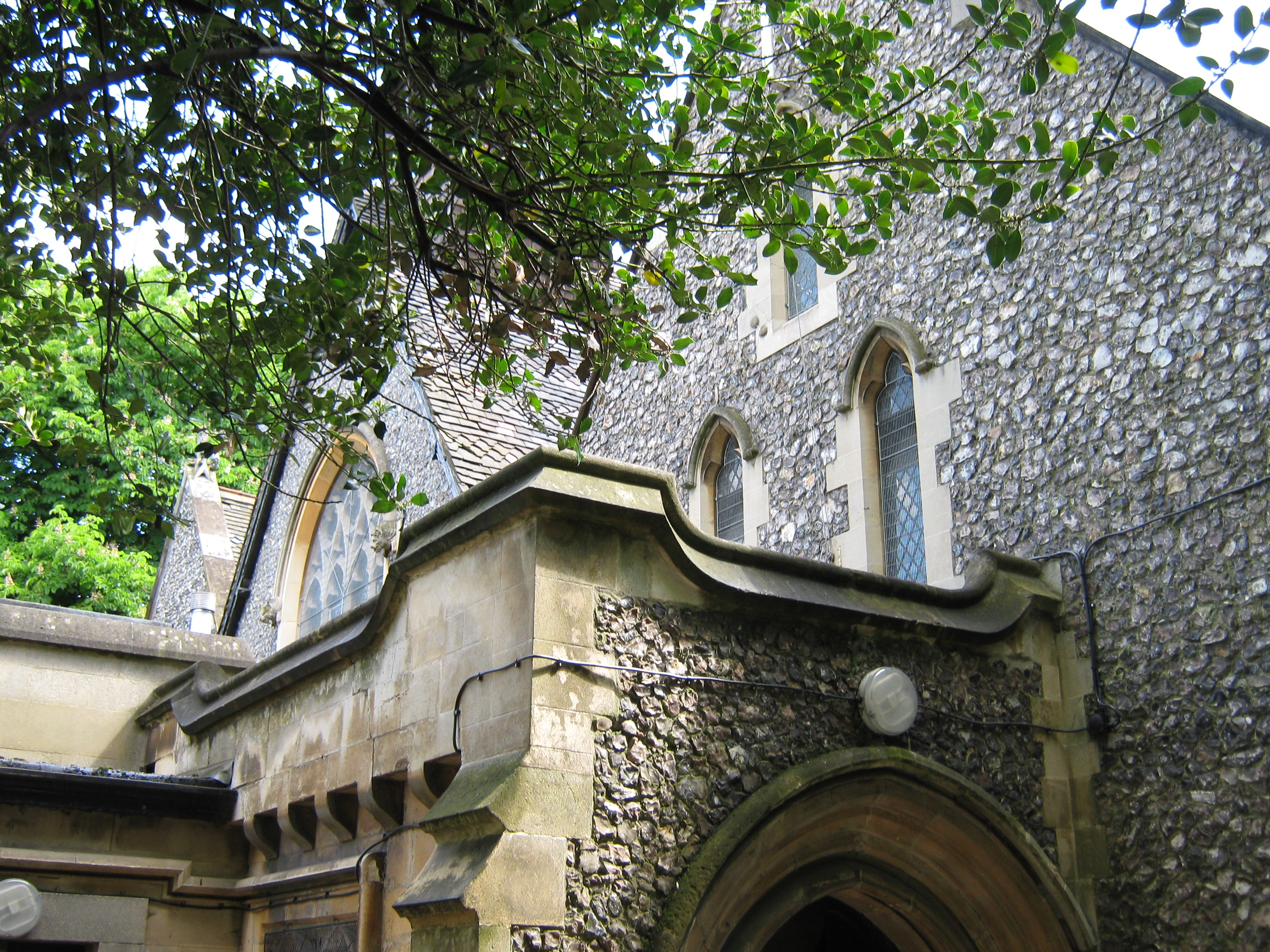
Church of St. John, Western Aspect

Sudbury Methodist Church is situated opposite Butlers Green, and St. Andrew's Church of England, St. George's Catholic and the Church of St. John the Evangelist are located several hundred yards further up the Harrow Road. St George's is a Grade II-listed building designed by Leonard Williams.

St Andrew's Church started its life in 1904 as a mission church to Harrow Parish Church. The new church was designed by Arnold Mitchell (1863–1944) as part of the Harrow Church Extension Scheme, at a nett cost of £2,000 . The new mission church was dedicated on Wednesday 10 May 1905, by the Suffragan Bishop of Islington, and the first vicar was Reverend A M Bashford who served from 1910 to 1922. The church served as a place of worship until 1926, it is now used as the church hall. In June 1911 plans were laid to build a new church capably of holding 500 parishioners, the foundation stone was laid on 4 April 1925, and the new Church of St Andrew was Consecrated by the Lord Bishop of London on 20 March 1926. The first vicar was the Reverend A. Stone who served the parish from 1922 to 1930. St. Andrews is a Grade II-listed building.

The church of St John was designed by Gilbert Scott and originally built in the 1800s. It has had at least three extensions since then. Over the past year extensive work has been completed in the Church of St John's. This church, located at the eastern edge of Sudbury where it borders Wembley, dates from the Georgian era.

Through the late 80s and mid 90s, it had fallen into a state of disrepair. Significant subsidence had threatened its foundations. Thanks to charitable works the extensive underpinning work on the historic church has been completed, saving it for future generations. Phase 2 of the restoration contracted to building firm BRICKSTONE has restored the rusted and broken ornate railings and gate to its former glory. Phase 3 involving restoration of the Lychgate was completed in time for the mayoral visit on remembrance Sunday 2009.

== Demography ==
As of the 2011 census, Asian/Asian British: Indian were the largest ethnic group at 31%, followed by Asian/Asian British: Other Asian at 17% and with White: English/Welsh/Scottish/Northern Irish/British at 11%. After English with 7643 speakers, the next most spoken language is Gujarati with 2072 speakers.

== Politics and government ==
Sudbury is part of the Brent West constituency for elections to the House of Commons of the United Kingdom, currently represented by Barry Gardiner from the Labour Party.

Sudbury is part of the Sudbury ward for elections to Brent London Borough Council.

== Residents' Association ==
Sudbury Town Residents' Association (STRA), The aims and objectives of STRA are to serve and encourage wider participation by the community (including the shops) in the restoration of a clean and safe environment within Sudbury. STRA will work closely with Brent Council and other authorities to improve the conditions and safety in the area. STRA is a non-political and non-sectarian organisation.

== Notable residents ==
- Nicky Hopkins (1944–1994), musician
- Carlo Little (1938–2005), musician

== Transport ==
=== Underground ===
- Sudbury Town Station, on the Piccadilly line
- Sudbury Hill Station, on the Piccadilly line

=== Rail ===
- Sudbury & Harrow Road Station, on Chiltern Railways
- Sudbury Hill Harrow Station, on Chiltern Railways

=== Road ===
- A404 (Harrow Road, Wembley)
- A4005 (Bridgewater Road & Harrow Road, Harrow)
- A4127 (Greenford Road & Sudbury Court Drive)

=== Buses ===
- 18 (Euston to Sudbury Swan)
- 182 (Brent Cross to Harrow Weald)
- 92 (Ealing Hospital to Brent Park IKEA)
- H17 (Wembley Central to Harrow Bus Station)
- 245 (Golders Green to Alperton Sainsbury's)
