= Claremont High School, Kenton =

Claremont High School Academy Trust

Location
- Claremont Avenue; Kenton, Harrow, HA3 0UH; England; 51.5842°N 0.2933°W

Information
- Type: Academy
- Mottoes: Scarlet: "Simply the best"; Emerald: "Seize the day"; Sapphire: "Actions not words"; Gold: "Nothing but the best is good enough"
- Established: 1930
- Department for Education URN: 136656 Tables
- Ofsted: Reports
- Head teacher: Nicola Hyde-Boughey
- Teaching staff: ~104 (approx. 99 FTE).
- Gender: Mixed
- Age: 11 to 18
- Enrolment: 1650
- Houses: Emerald, Gold, Sapphire, Scarlet
- Colour: Navy blue
- Website: www.claremont-high.org.uk

Claremont High School is a co-educational, secondary school and sixth form located in Kenton, in the London Borough of Brent, United Kingdom. The headteacher is Ms Nicola Hyde-Boughey. The school has been an academy since 1 April 2011. The school has been consistently rated by Ofsted as 'outstanding' and this status remained after the most recent 2025 inspection.

== School roll ==
For the school year 2024/25 there were 1,650 pupils on the roll.

== History ==
The school was founded in 1930 by the Middlesex County Council, and was one of a number of new schools built by the council between the wars in the rapidly developing outer suburbs of London. Claremont is now a multi-specialist school. In 2001, it was designated a specialist school in performing arts. In 2006, it was designated as having a second specialism in mathematics and computing. In 2012, the school gained academy status, joining many other local schools. In 2017 Claremont became part of a multi-academy trust called Chrysalis Multi-Academy Trust, or CMAT.

== Alumni ==
Former Nottingham Forest and England player Stuart Pearce attended Claremont High School in the 1970s.
