= Kenton Road =

Road in Harrow and Kenton, London

Coordinates: 51°35′12″N 0°17′55″W

A4006

Route information
- Length: 3.6 mi (5.8 km) (length of A4006, not Kenton Road)

Location
- Country: United Kingdom
- Constituent country: England

Road network
- Roads in the United Kingdom; Motorways; A and B road zones

Kenton Road is a main road in the London Borough of Harrow and the London Borough of Brent. It lies in the areas of Harrow and Kenton.

== Route and landmarks ==
Its eastern end is the border of Kenton and Kingsbury (in NW9) in London. Kenton Road is the A4006, apart from a short stretch west of Northwick Park roundabout, which is a small part of the A404. The road east of the Kenton Methodist Church originally followed the route of what is now Woodgrange Avenue and was a continuation of Kenton Lane before being upgraded, re-positioned and renamed in the early 20th century as an eastward extension of the original Kenton Road.

On the north side of the road, almost opposite Kenton station is the Traveller's Rest pub. Approximately 1/3 mi (0.54 km) further along the A4006, also on the north side of the road, at the junction with St Leonard's Avenue, is the parish church of St Mary-the-Virgin, Kenton, built in 1935-1936 by the architect Harold Gibbons and a local firm of builders, Melsom & Rosier. Approximately 1 mile (1.6 km) further on, on the south side of the Kenton Road is All Saints Catholic Church, built in 1963. About another 1/3 mi (0.54 km) further on is the Greek Orthodox Church of St Panteleimon. Originally a mission church of the Church of England parish, it was acquired in recent years by the Greek community, which has replaced it with a traditional Greek Basilica complete with bronze dome (2011).

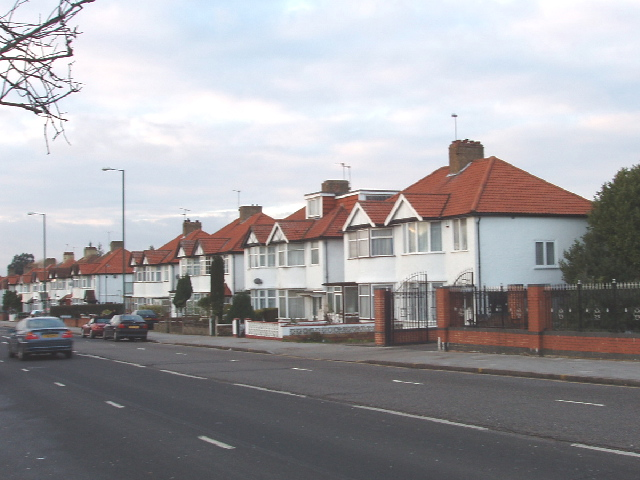
Houses on Kenton Road
