= Kenton, London =

District in England

Coordinates: 51.5878°N 0.3086°W

Kenton
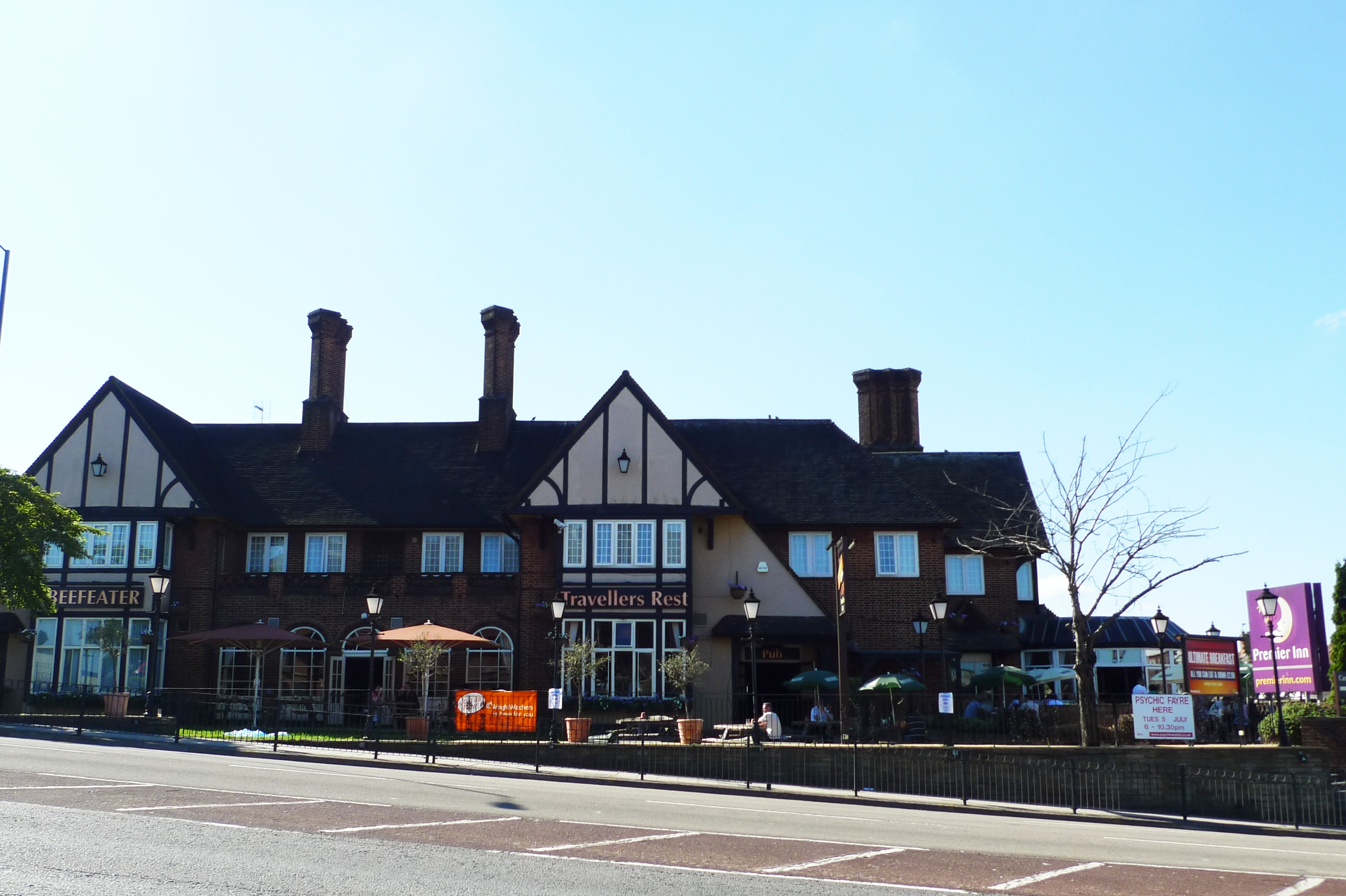
- The Beefeater Travellers Rest pub, and its adjoined Premier Inn hotel - the Travellers’ Rest was once the largest public house in the County of Middlesex

- Location within Greater London
- Population: 35,600 (2015 data, Kenton ward; Kenton East ward; Kenton West ward.)
- OS grid reference: TQ175885
- London borough: Brent; Harrow
- Ceremonial county: Greater London
- Region: London
- Country: England
- Sovereign state: United Kingdom
- Post town: HARROW
- Postcode district: HA3
- Dialling code: 020
- Police: Metropolitan
- Fire: London
- Ambulance: London
- UK Parliament: Harrow East
- London Assembly: Brent and Harrow

Kenton is a locality in north-west London, England, to the east of and contiguous with the town of Harrow and historically in Middlesex. As with surroundings in Harrow, Wembley and Kingsbury, the area was a product of Metroland suburbia of the early 20th century. Both the London and North Western Railway and Metropolitan Railway reached the area by the 1920s. The main road through Kenton, the east-west Kenton Road, is a busy and important road that links Harrow to the major Edgware Road. The road now forms the boundary between the London boroughs of Harrow and Brent.

== History ==
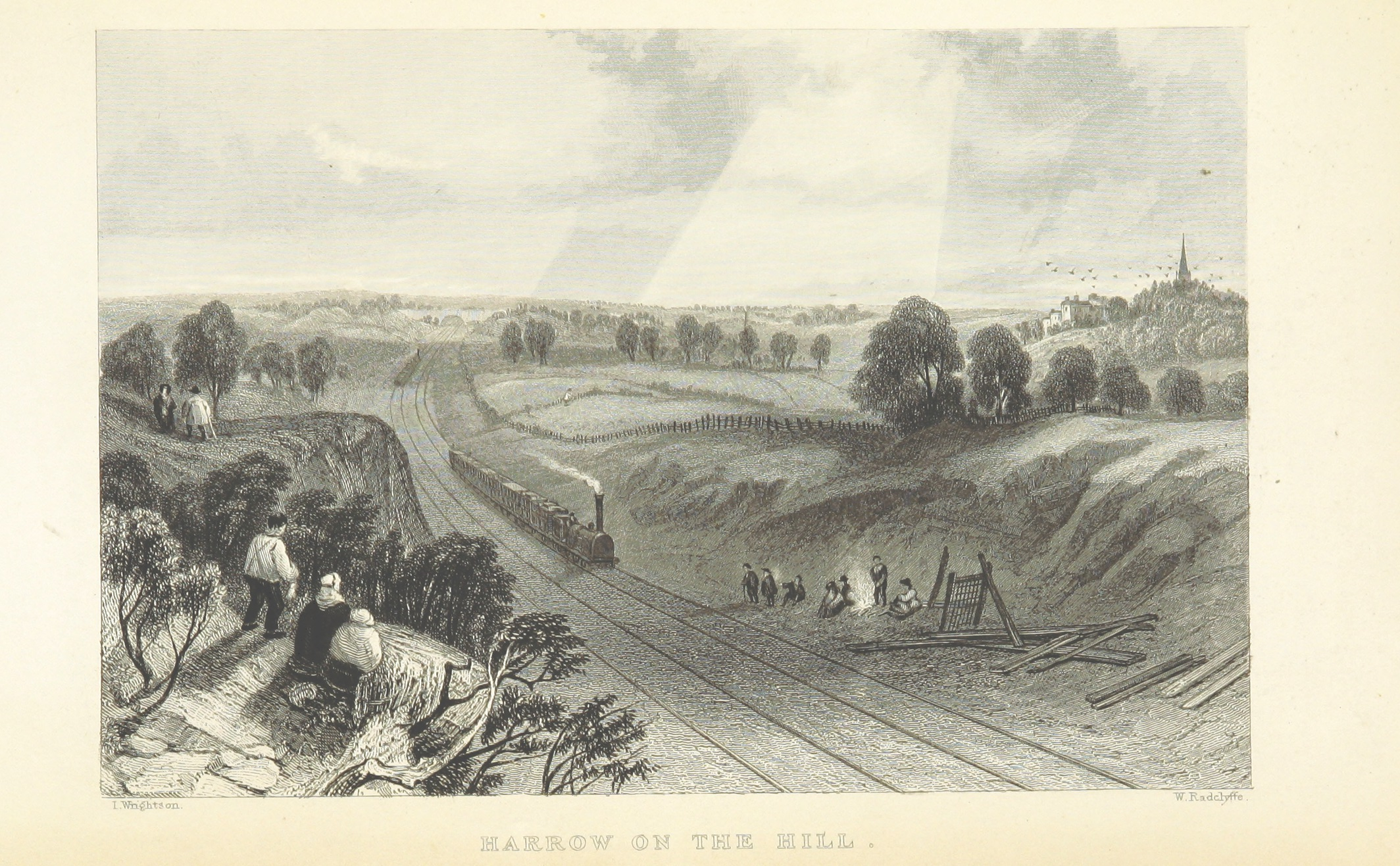
The London to Birmingham railway, train illustrated near present-day Kenton (1839)

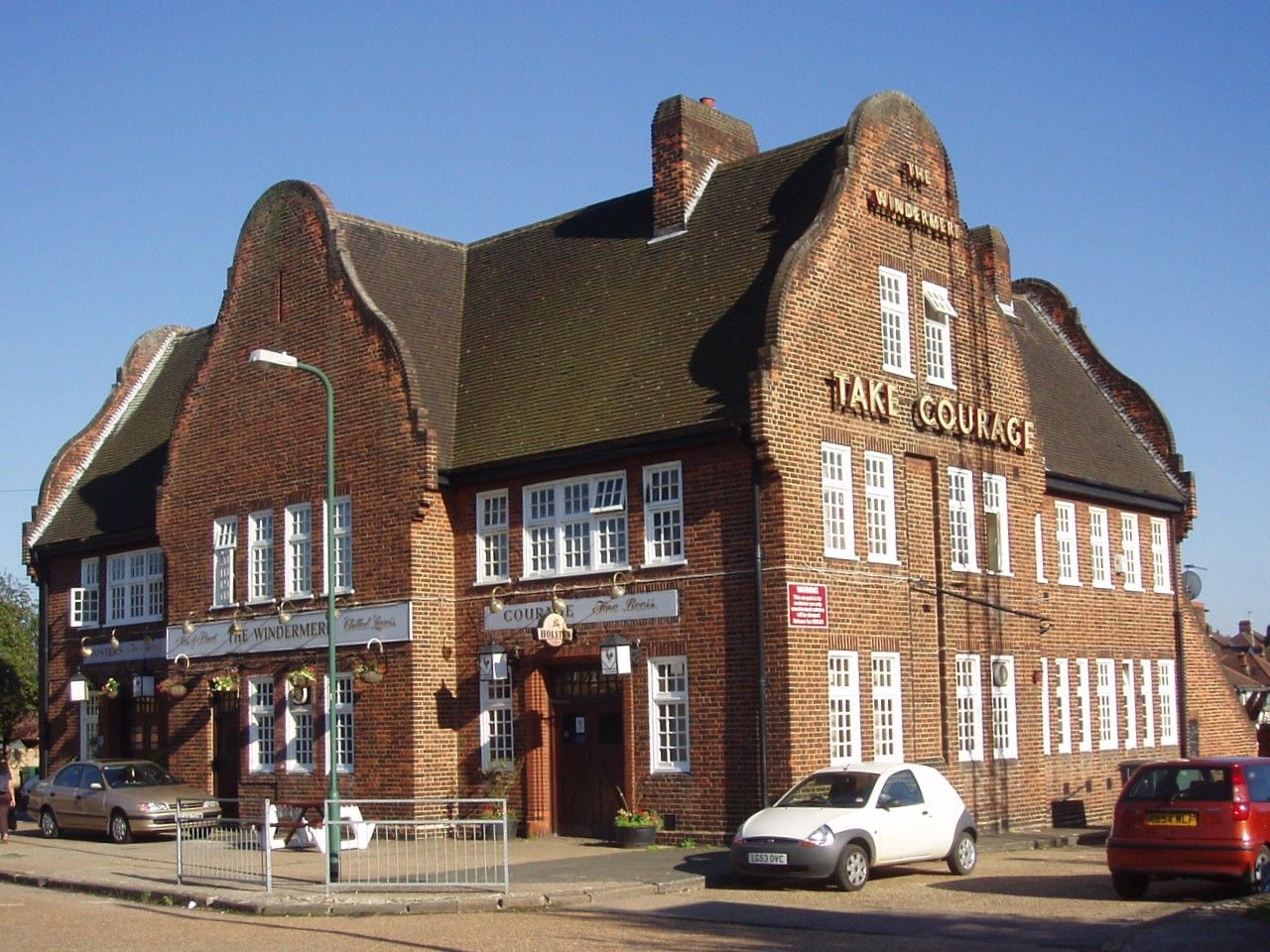
The Windermere is a public house, located next to South Kenton station

The hamlet was recorded as "Keninton" in 1232. The name derives from the personal name of the Saxon "Coena" and the Old English "tun", a farm – and means "the farm of Coena" and his family who once lived on a site near here. Before the 20th century, the tiny settlement was concentrated around in what was Kenton Lane (the easternmost part of which remains as Old Kenton Lane to the east of Kingsbury station) and is now part of the present-day Woodgrange Avenue and Kenton Road.

The Windermere is a Grade II listed public house in Windermere Avenue. It is on the Campaign for Real Ale's National Inventory of Historic Pub Interiors and was built in 1938. The Plough public house was Kenton's first, opening in the early 18th century; the current building is not the original. It is now an Indo-Chinese fusion restaurant and bar.

Local Primary Schools include Uxendon Manor on Vista Way and Priestmead Primary School on Hartford Avenue. The local high school is Claremont High School on Claremont Avenue off Kenton Road.

Kenton station was opened by the London and North Western Railway on 15 June 1912. The Metropolitan Railway's Northwick Park and Kenton station (later renamed Northwick Park) followed on 28 June 1923.

== Geography ==
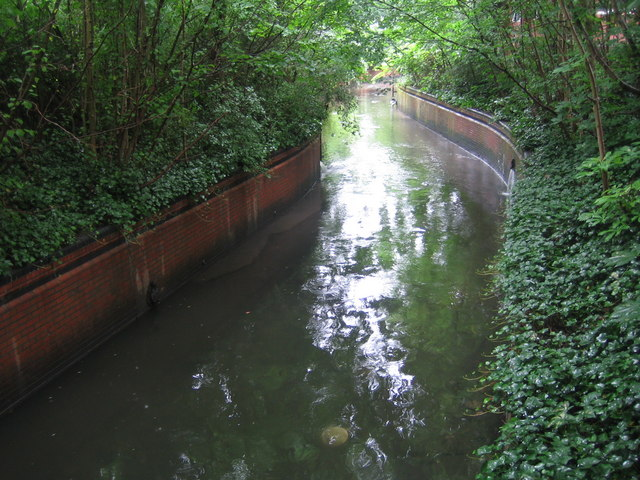
The Wealdstone Brook by a footbridge near Shaftesbury Drive

From its original location near The Grange, Kenton expanded toward Wealdstone, Wembley and Stanmore after the opening of Kenton station on the Euston to Watford Junction railway in 1912 and grew into a suburb of London from the 1920s.

The South Kenton area is distinct from Kenton, being almost contiguous with North Wembley and Preston. It is entirely within Brent.

Most of the district is part of the HA3 postcode, but the southern part is in HA9 and Northwick Park is in HA1.

=== Waterways ===
The Wealdstone Brook is the only visible waterway within the area. It has two branches, one originating in Wealdstone and the other in Stanmore; these combine underground near the junction of Kenton Lane and Kenton Road. The Western (Wealdstone) branch is in culvert as far as the south side of the Kenton Recreation Ground; the Eastern (Stanmore) branch is mostly in culvert from near the source on Clamp Hill to where it combines with the Western branch. It functions mainly as a land drain devoid of wildlife until it reaches Woodcock Park and was previously heavily polluted by run-off water and illicit connections from adjacent houses; a 2013 Thames Water project in the vicinity of Woodcock Park identified 140 premises discharging into the Brook.

== Housing ==
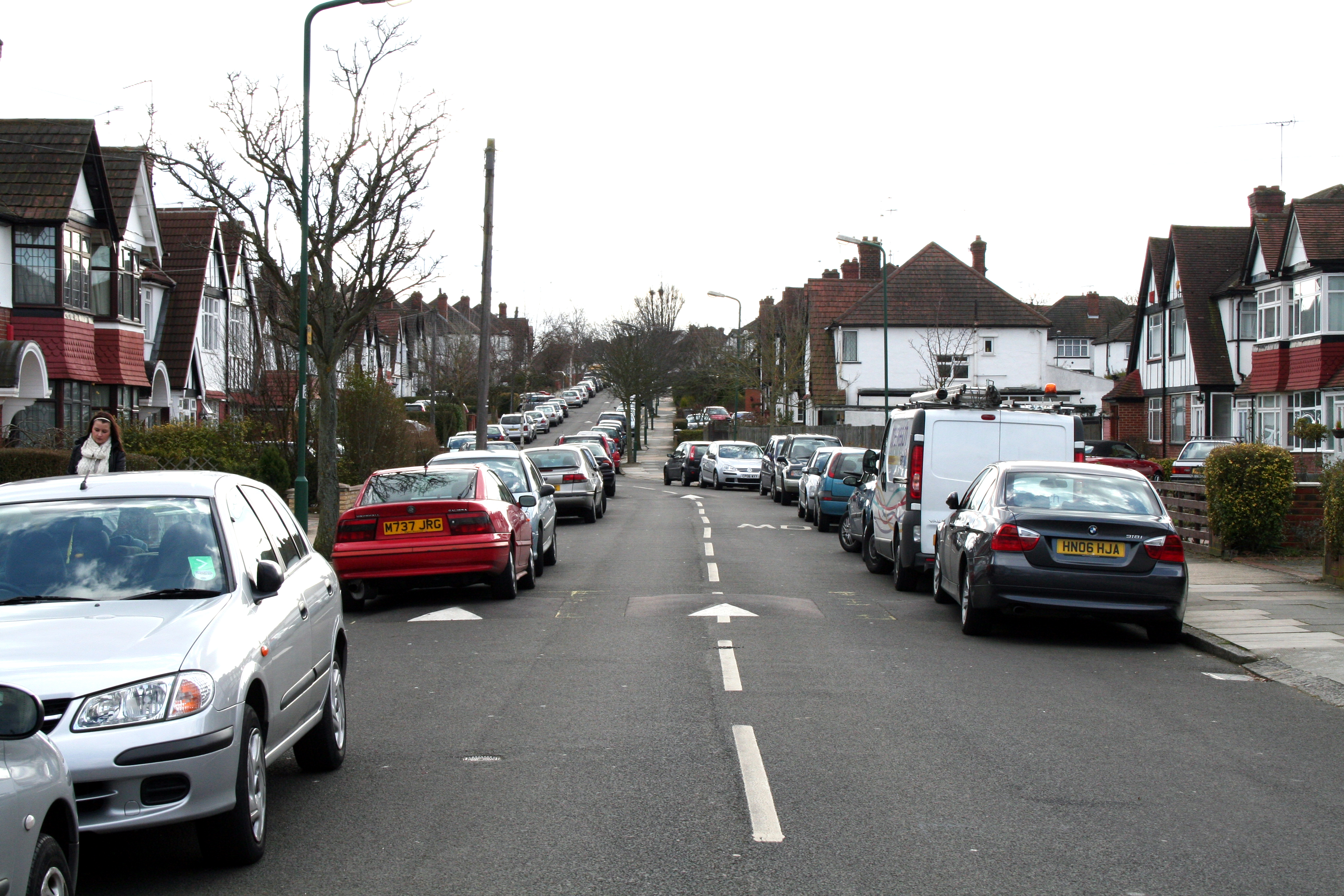
Nathans Road, a street near South Kenton station

The coming of the railways was soon followed by suburban development, most of Kenton being built between the Wars.

LCC cottage estates 1918–1939
Estate name	Area	No of dwellings	Population 1938	Population density
Pre-1914
Norbury	11	218	867	19.8 per acre (49/ha)
Old Oak	32	736	3519	23 per acre (57/ha)
Totterdown Fields	39	1262	—	32.4 per acre (80/ha)
Tower Gardens; White Hart Lane	98	783	5936	8 per acre (20/ha)
1919–1923
Becontree	2770	25769 (Note: Source says 2589 – transcription error)	115652	9.3 per acre (23/ha)
Bellingham	252	2673	12004	10.6 per acre (26/ha)
Castelnau	51	644	2851	12.6 per acre (31/ha)
Dover House Estate; Roehampton Estate	147	1212	5383	8.2 per acre (20/ha)
1924–1933
Downham	600	7096	30032	11.8 per acre (29/ha)
Mottingham	202	2337	9009	11.6 per acre (29/ha)
St Helier	825	9068	39877	11 per acre (27/ha)
Watling	386	4034	19110	10.5 per acre (26/ha)
Wormholt	68	783	4078	11.5 per acre (28/ha)
1934–1939
Chingford (Note: Part of a larger PRC estate around Huntsman Road)	217	1540	—	7.1 per acre (18/ha)
Hanwell (Ealing)	140	1587	6732	11.3 per acre (28/ha)
Headstone Lane	142	n.a	5000	
Kenmore Park	58	654	2078	11.3 per acre (28/ha)
Thornhill (Royal Borough of Greenwich)	21	380	1598	18.1 per acre (45/ha)
Whitefoot Lane (Downham)	49	n.a	n.a.	
Source: Yelling, J. A. (1995). "Banishing London's slums: The interwar cottage estates" (PDF). Transactions. 46. London and Middlesex Archeological Society: 167–173. Quotes: Rubinstein, 1991, Just like the country.

The London County Council built the Kenmore Park cottage estate between the wars. There are 654 houses on the 58 acres (23 ha) site, a housing density of 11.3 per acre (28/ha).

Thomas Francis Nash owned building companies which from the 1920s onward built numerous private housing estates in Kenton, Ruislip and other parts of the "Metroland" area of Middlesex. F. & C. Costin was another local building company that built much of Kenton between the wars. Local estate agents still use the term "Nash-built" or "Costin-built" to describe properties built by them in Kenton.

== Culture and media ==
Apart from the infamous appearance of several of Kenton's streets in the "Gourmet Night" episode of the BBC-TV comedy series Fawlty Towers starring John Cleese, the only known reference to Kenton in modern popular culture is the song "Kenton Kev", by the Berlin-based punk-jazz band The Magoo Brothers on their album "Beyond Believable", released on the Bouncing Corporation label in 1988. The song refers to the "pleasant valley" high suburban boredom factor then prevalent in the area, and cites local characters and places, some fairly well known. It is said that "Kenton Kev" refers in fact to Kevin Jones, the US-based property magnate, who was actually born in Kenton. The song was written by Paul Bonin, Philip Ulysses Sanders and Melanie Hickford, all of whom grew up and lived in the area.

== Demography ==
Kenton is represented by three electoral wards: Kenton East and Kenton West in Harrow, and Kenton in Brent. All together the population was 35,600 as of 2015.

Kenton has a high degree of its population belonging to ethnic minorities, over 70% in all three wards and higher than the Harrow and Brent averages; like much of Harrow and Wembley, there is a particularly large number of people from Indian descent.

The Kenton ward in Brent has a female life expectancy of 91.6 years, which is the third-highest in Greater London. The male expectancy was 83.3 years. The crime rate of Kenton East ward in Harrow was 33.5 in 2014/15, which was one of the lowest out of all wards in Greater London. Kenton East also has the lowest proportion of bicycle commuters in Greater London, amounting to only 0.2% of the population.

== Governance ==
Kenton is part of both the Harrow East parliamentary constituency, most recently represented by Bob Blackman (Conservative), and the Brent North constituency which is represented by Barry Gardiner (Labour).

Kenton is divided between the London boroughs of Harrow and Brent. Kenton is partly contained in the Kenton ward for elections to Brent London Borough Council. For elections to Harrow London Borough Council, Kenton is split between Kenton East and Kenton West.

== Public services ==
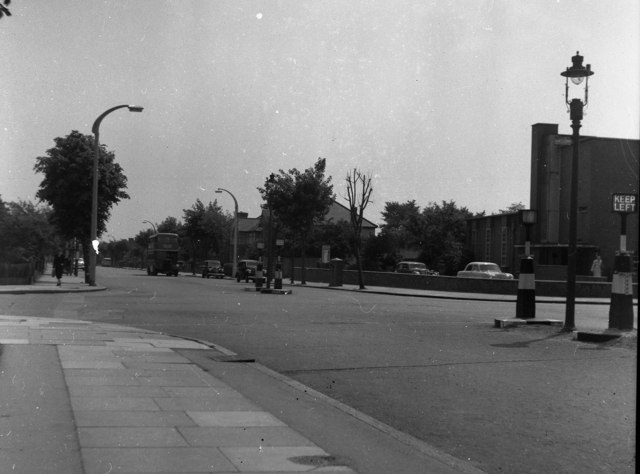
Kenton Library (1955)

Kenton Library, run by Harrow Council, is located in Kenton Lane. Kenton Ambulance Station is located at the eastern end of Kenton, near Kingsbury Circle. Northwick Park Hospital is located very close by Kenton.

=== Parks and sports ===
There are three large open spaces in or near Kenton: Woodcock Park, Kenton Recreation Ground, and Northwick Park directly to the west in the northern part of Wembley.

The Kenton Sports Club and its ground is located on Kenton Lane which consists of cricket, tennis and table tennis.

=== Education ===
Secondary schools in the area are: St Gregory's Catholic Science College, Claremont High School, and JFS.

=== Religion ===
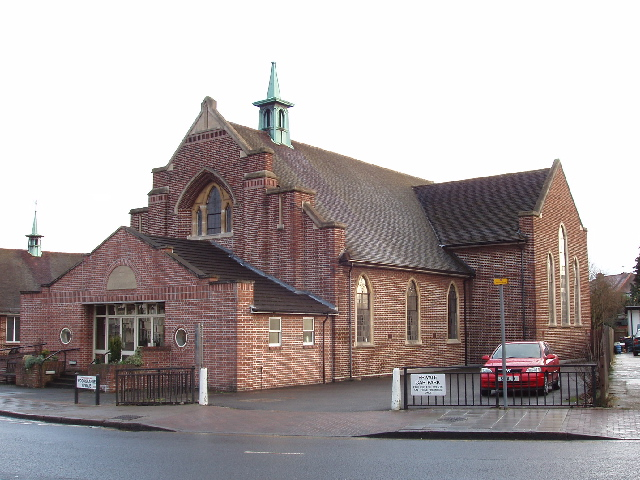
Kenton Methodist Church

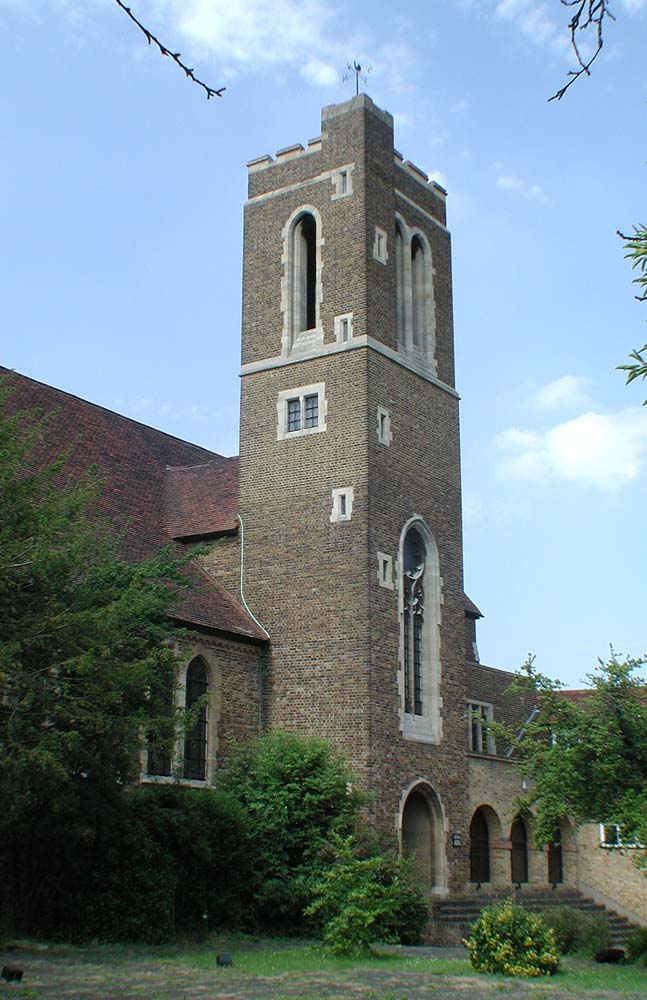
Tower of the Church of St Mary the Virgin, on Kenton Road

Kenton has several religious institutions. Churches in the area include the Parish Church of St Mary the Virgin, Kenton Baptist Church, Kenton Evangelical Church, and Kenton Methodist Church. Further east on Kenton Road are the All Saints Roman Catholic Church, and the St Panteleimon Greek Orthodox Church, the latter being one of the capital's few Greek Orthodox churches outside North London. The building of St Panteleimon's dates back to 1932. It was originally built as a mission church for St Mary's, used by the Orthodox community from 1989, and acquired fully in 1994.

There are two Hindu mandirs: Haridham Swaminarayan Temple on Woodcock Hill, and Shree Kutch Satsang Swaminarayan Temple by Kenton Road. Kenton is also home to one of the UK's Derasars on the east side of Kenton Road which serve followers of Jainism. By Woodcock Park is also a United Synagogue. There are no mosques in Kenton itself but the Harrow Central Mosque is quite proximate from some parts.

== Transport ==
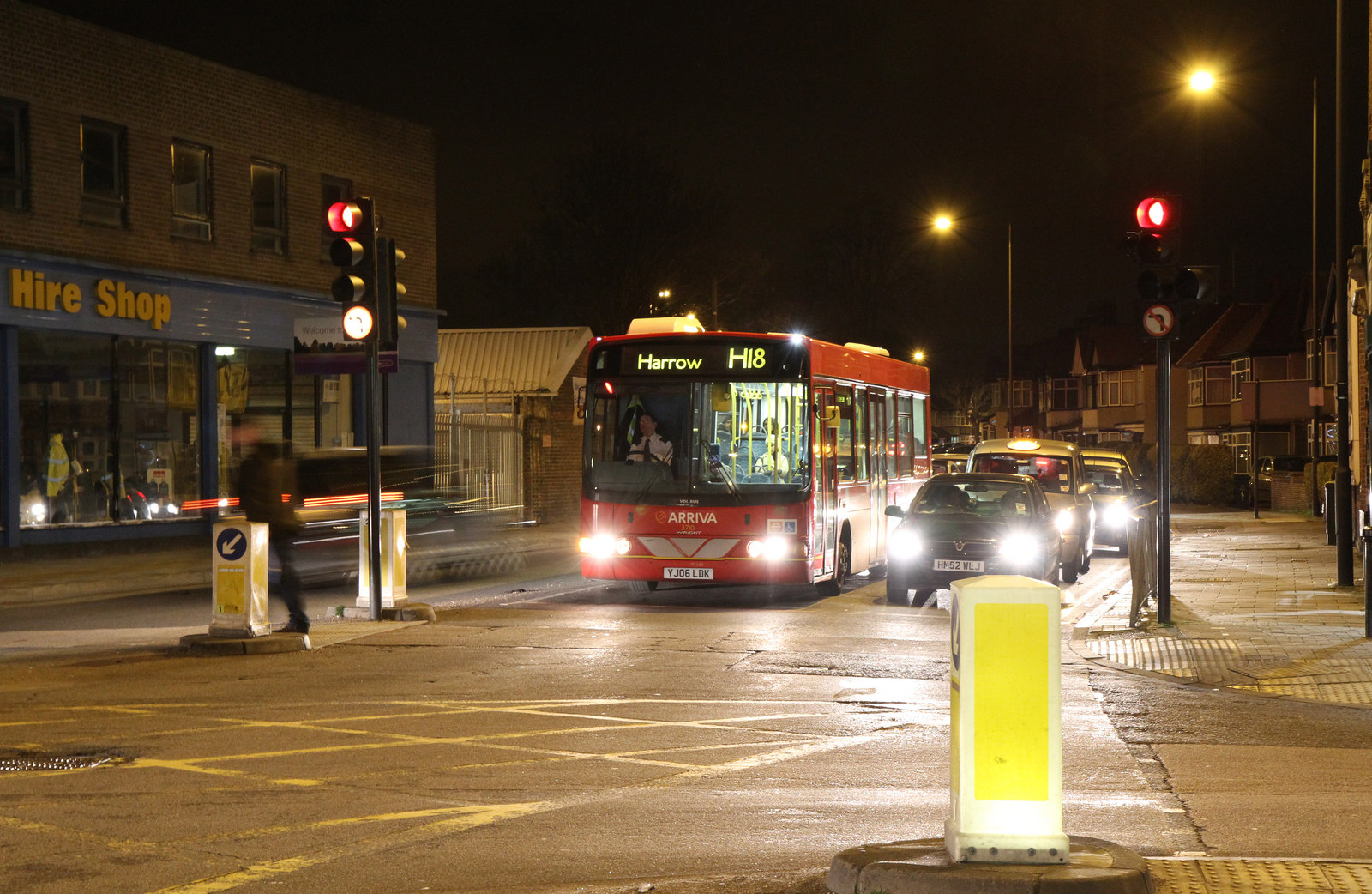
Bus H18 in Kenton Lane

=== Buses ===
The following London Bus routes operate through the area:

Route	Start	End	Operator
114	Mill Hill Broadway	Ruislip	London Sovereign
183	Golders Green	Pinner	London Sovereign
223	Harrow	Wembley	London United
H9/H10 Circular	Northwick Park Hospital H9: anticlockwise	Northwick Park Hospital H10: clockwise	London Sovereign
H18/H19 Circular	Harrow H18: anticlockwise	Harrow H19: clockwise	London Sovereign

=== Tube/trains ===
Stations in the area are:

- Kenton Station (Bakerloo line & Watford DC Line)
- South Kenton Station (Bakerloo line & Watford DC Line)
- Northwick Park Station (Metropolitan line)

== Notable people ==
- Actress Michele Austin, best known as PC Yvonne Hemmingway in ITV's The Bill, attended Claremont High School in Kenton
- Baroness Shami Chakrabarti, the human rights lawyer, was born in Kenton
- Cricketer Denis Compton (1918–1997) lived in Kenton
- TV exercise instructor Mr Motivator (Derrick Evans) lived in Kenton
- Mary Millington (1945–1979), 1970s sex symbol, was born in Kenton
- Actress Sophie Okonedo lived in Kenton
- Stuart "Psycho" Pearce, football manager and former player, attended Claremont High School in Kenton
- Actress Pam St. Clement, best known as Pat in BBC soap EastEnders, lived in Kenton
- Ken Simmons (1929–2002), ornithologist
- Journalist and broadcaster John Timpson (1928–2005) was born in Kenton
- Footballer Darren Ward was born in Kenton
- Actress Mary Wimbush (1924–2005), best known as Julia Pargetter in BBC Radio 4's The Archers, was born in Kenton

== Gallery ==
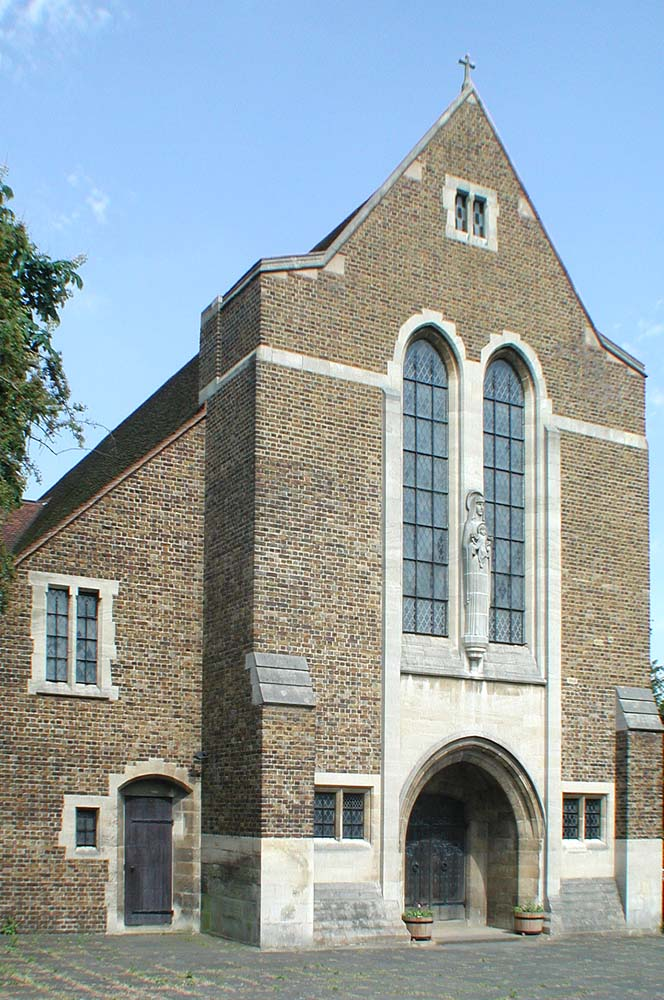
Front entrance to St Mary Church

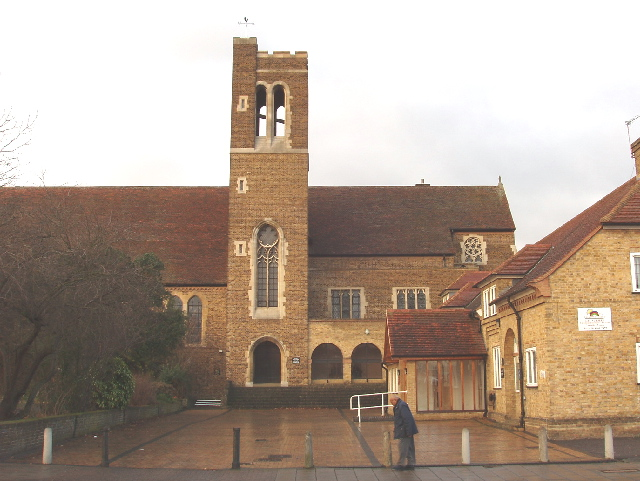
Front entrance to St Mary Church

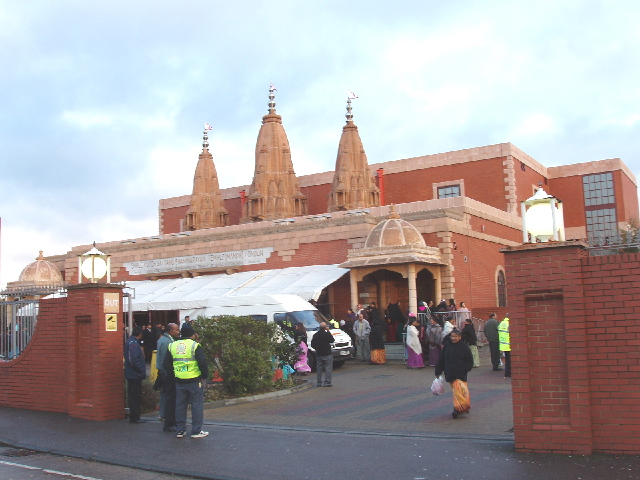
Shree Kutch Satsang Swaminarayan, Hindu mandir

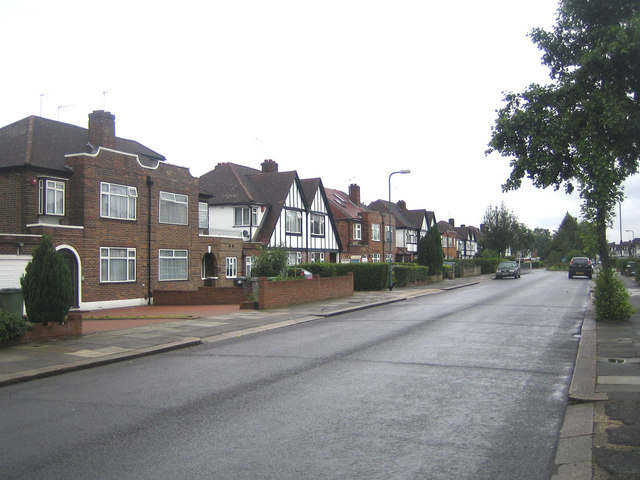
Lindsay Drive in Kenton

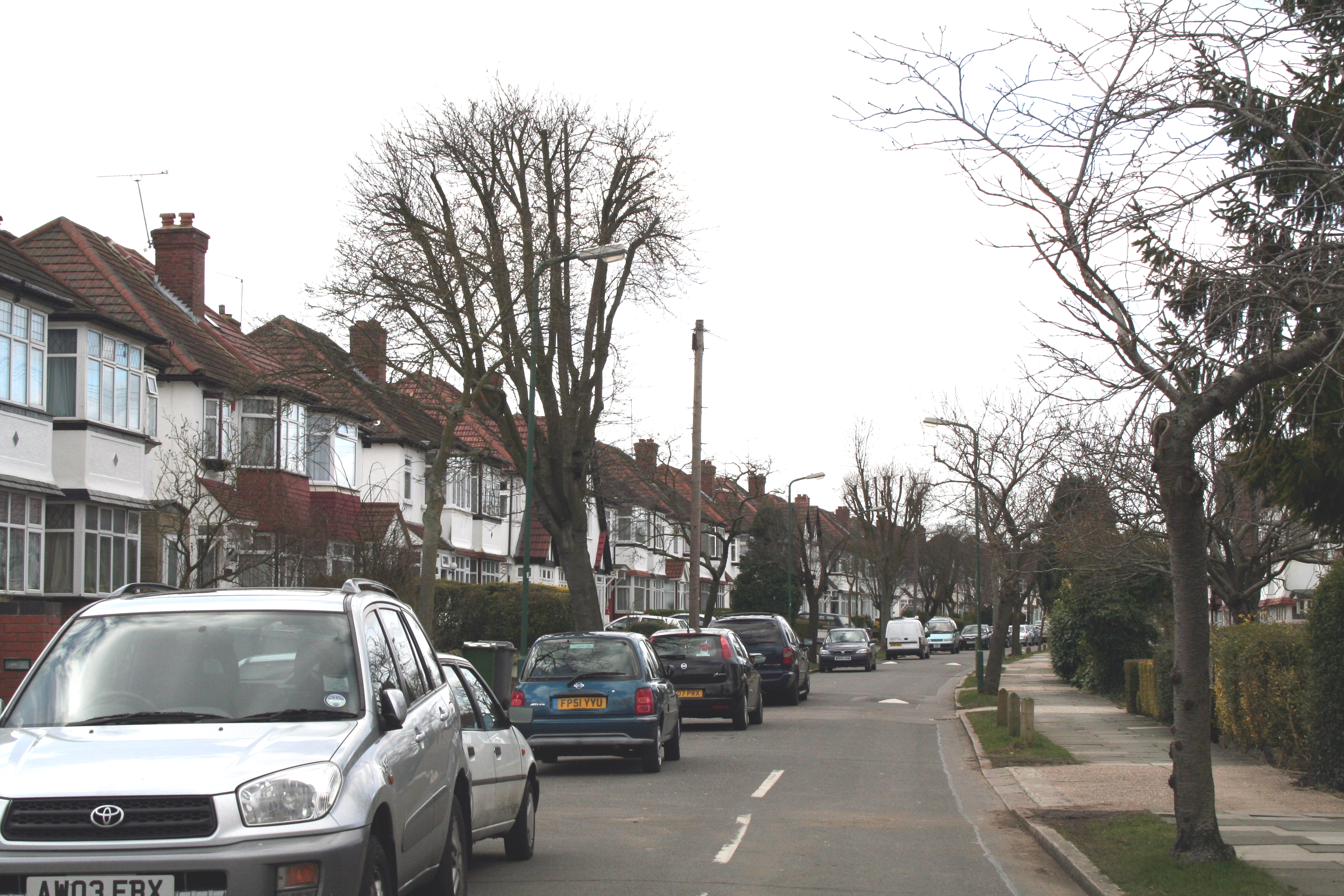
Abbott's Drive in South Kenton

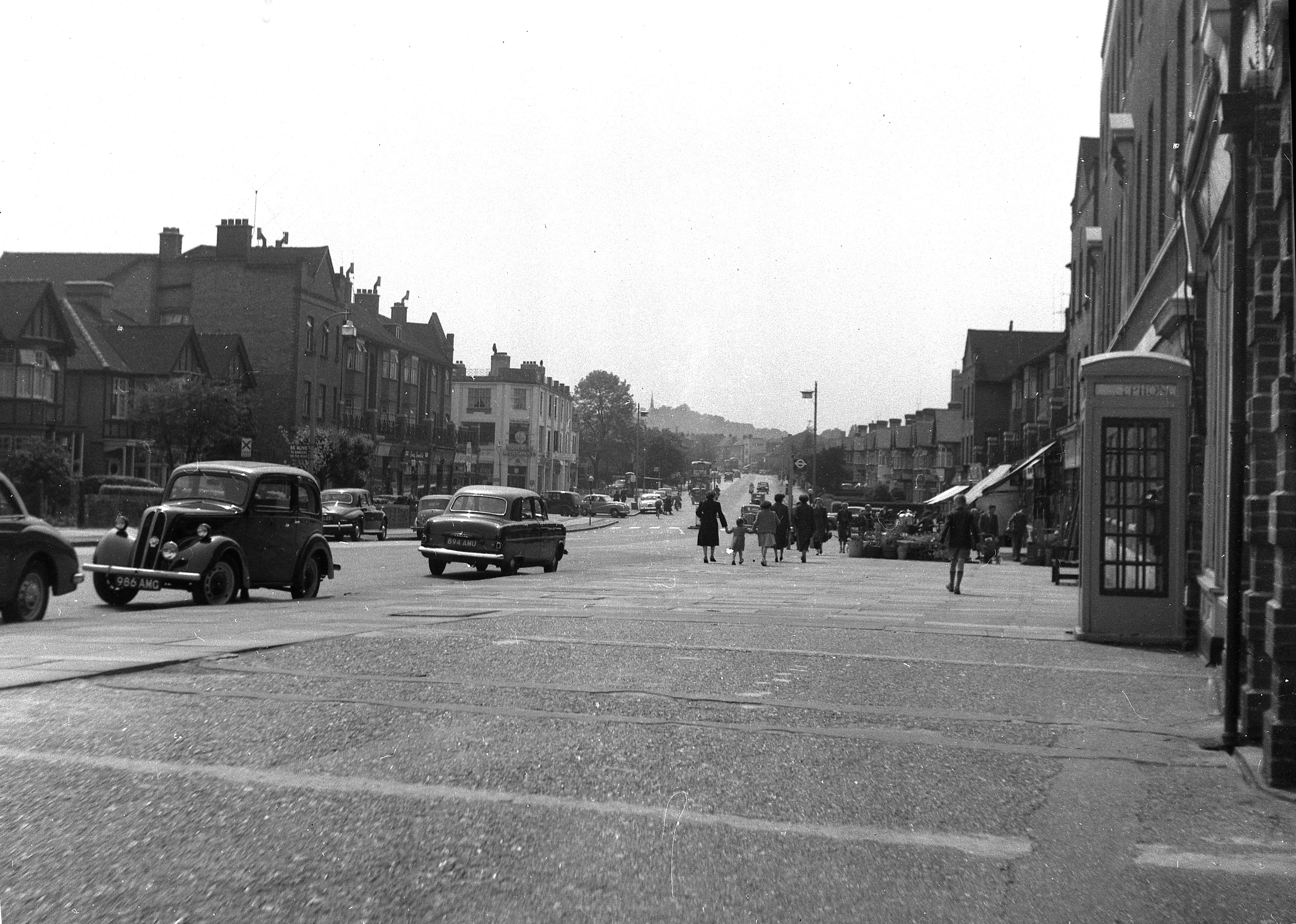
Kenton Road, near Kenton Park Parade, in 1955; the spire of St Mary's Church on Harrow Hill is visible in the background
