= Ruislip Gardens =

Area in London, England

Coordinates: 51.5602°N 0.4102°W

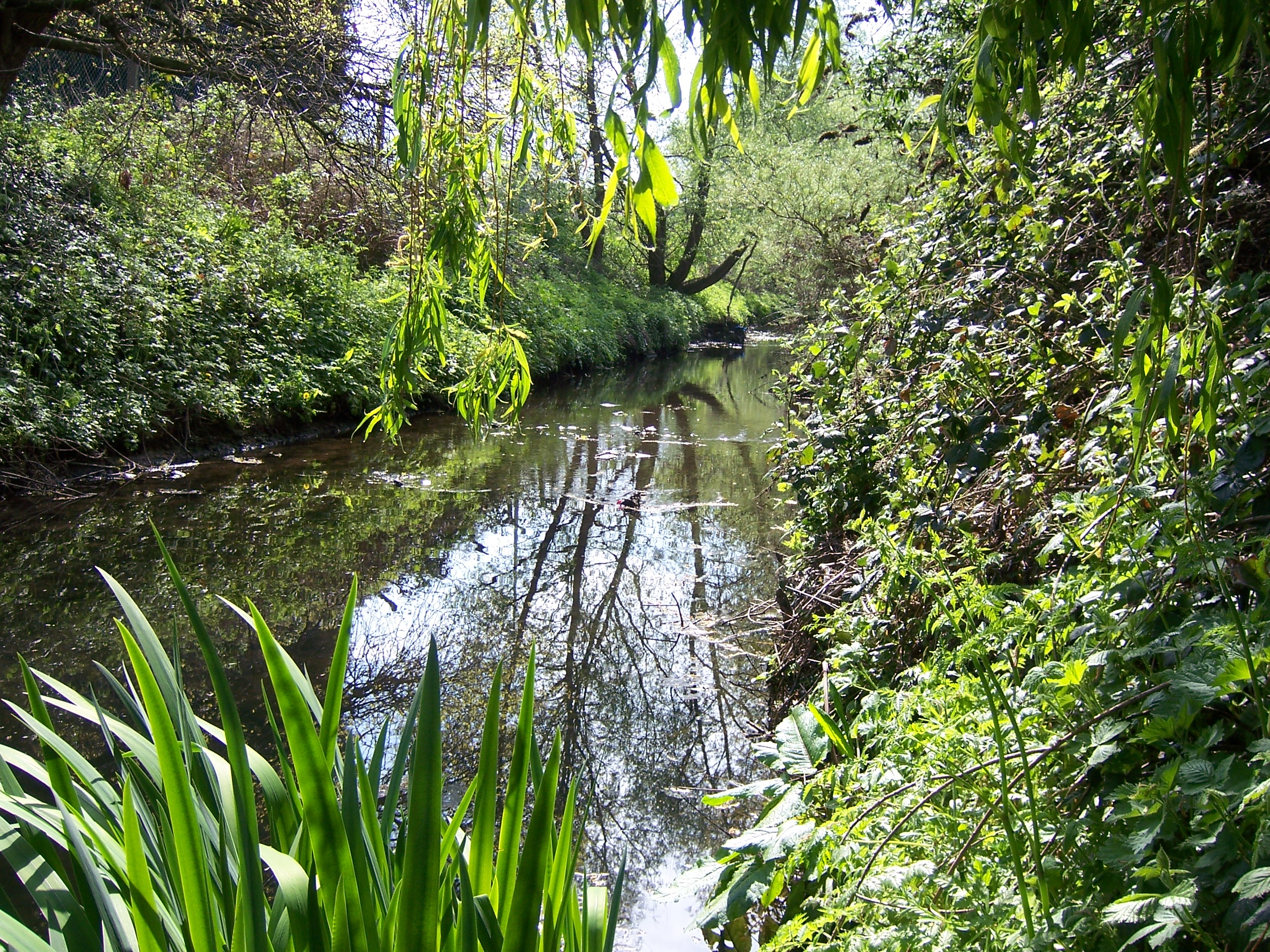
- The Yeading Brook in Ruislip Gardens

- Location within Greater London
- OS grid reference: TQ0986
- London borough: Hillingdon
- Ceremonial county: Greater London
- Region: London
- Country: England
- Sovereign state: United Kingdom
- Post town: RUISLIP
- Postcode district: HA4
- Dialling code: 01895
- Police: Metropolitan
- Fire: London
- Ambulance: London
- London Assembly: Ealing and Hillingdon

Ruislip Gardens is an area in the London Borough of Hillingdon.

== Education ==
Ruislip Gardens School is situated here.

== Transport ==
Ruislip Gardens tube station is served by the Central line of the London Underground.

== Landmarks ==
The main entrance to RAF Northolt is adjacent to the local tube station in South Ruislip.
