= Wembley High Technology College =

Location
- East Lane; Wembley, Middlesex, HA0 3NT; England; 51°33′47″N 0°18′38″W

Information
- Type: Academy
- Motto: Achievement For All
- Established: 1934
- Department for Education URN: 138457 Tables
- Ofsted: Reports
- Headteacher: Thomas Best
- Gender: Coeducational
- Age: 11 to 18
- Enrolment: 1400
- Colours: Blue and Red and white
- Website: http://www.whtc.co.uk/

Wembley High Technology College (also known as WHTC) is a coeducational secondary school and sixth form with academy status, situated in Brent, a borough situated in Greater London, England. WHTC is part of Wembley Multi-Academy Trust. The CEO is Beth Ragheb.

Formerly called East Lane County Secondary school since 1934, then Wembley High School from 1979, Wembley High Technology College was established in 2003 and is a popular and heavily oversubscribed secondary school. Tom Best is the current headteacher. Wembley High was assessed as 'Outstanding' by Ofsted and has achieved one of the top results in Brent. The Chair of Governors is Mr Alan McDougall, and the school's ward is located at Northwick Park.

The college has recently improved facilities, adding a new science block, maths block, 6th form block, several astroturf pitches, and a new hall. The school converted to academy status in August 2012 and joined Wembley Multi-Academy Trust in 2016.
