= Sudbury Hill =

Coordinates: 51.554°N 0.337°W

- Location within Greater London
- OS grid reference: TQ165852
- London borough: Harrow
- Ceremonial county: Greater London
- Region: London
- Country: England
- Sovereign state: United Kingdom
- Post town: HARROW
- Postcode district: HA1
- Dialling code: 020
- Police: Metropolitan
- Fire: London
- Ambulance: London
- UK Parliament: Harrow West
- London Assembly: Brent and Harrow

Sudbury Hill is a small locality of Sudbury in north-western London, England. It is in the London Borough of Harrow and lies by the border of the London Borough of Brent and London Borough of Ealing. It forms part of the HA1 postcode and Harrow post town.

Located immediately north of North Greenford and almost a mile from Sudbury, Sudbury Hill was originally an ancient link between Harrow on the Hill and Wembley, which survives today as the A4005. The area has two railway stations, Sudbury Hill Harrow railway station and Sudbury Hill tube station, which are both located on the Greenford Road (south of the Sudbury Hill A4005 road itself).

== Gallery ==
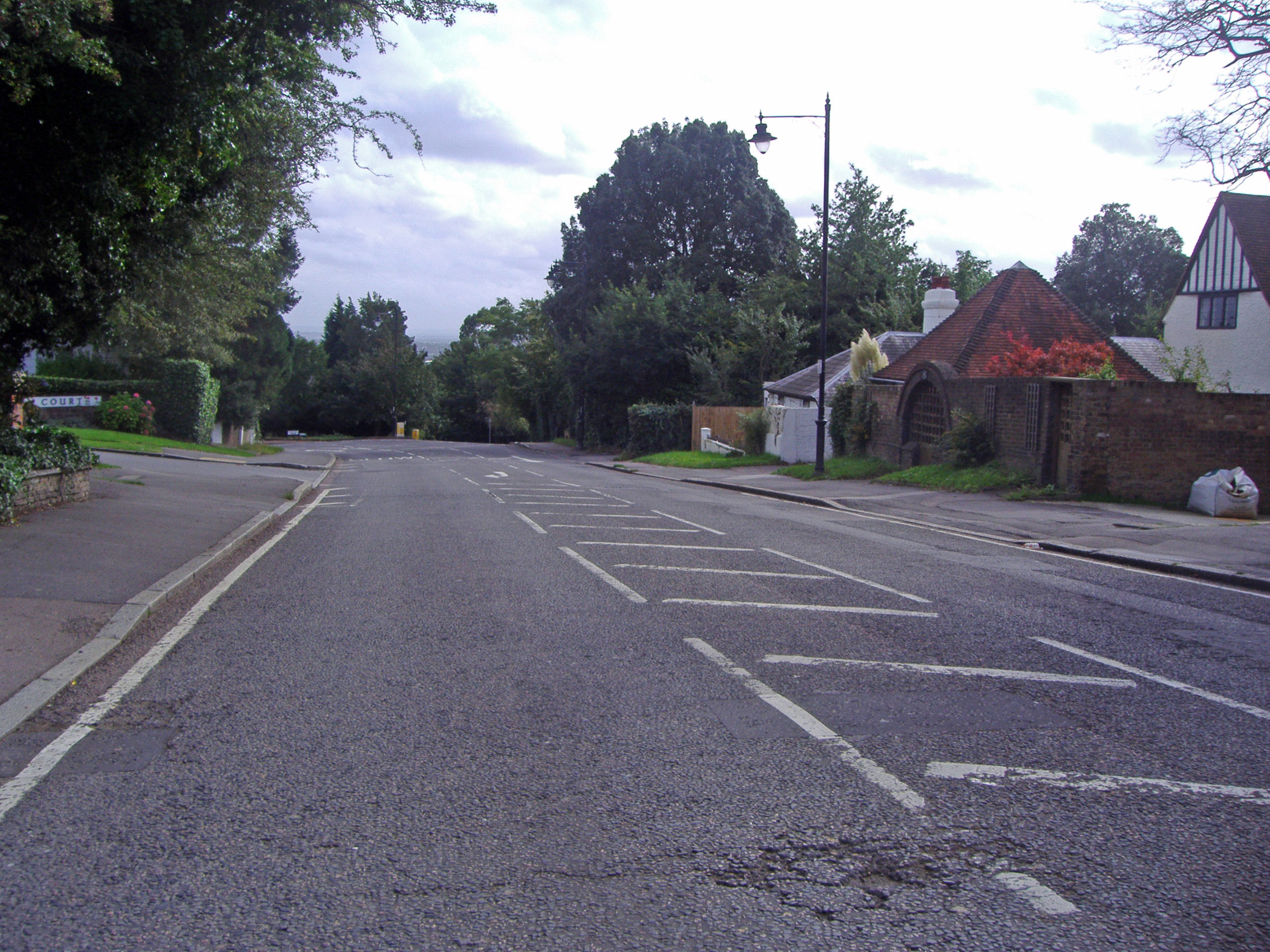
A4005 Sudbury Hill

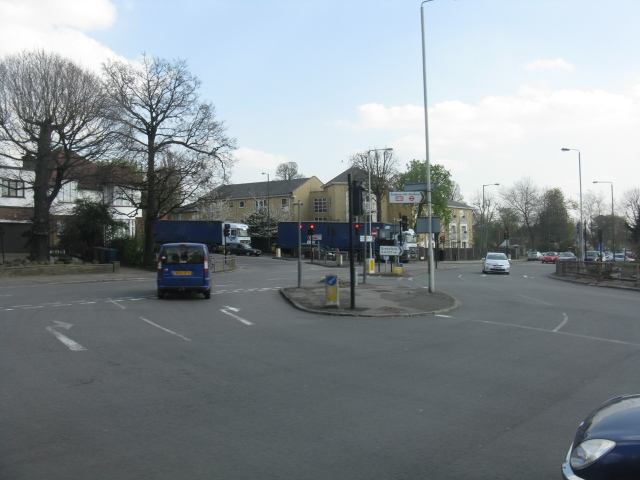
The crossroads of Sudbury Hill, Sudbury Court Drive, Harrow Road, Greenford Road

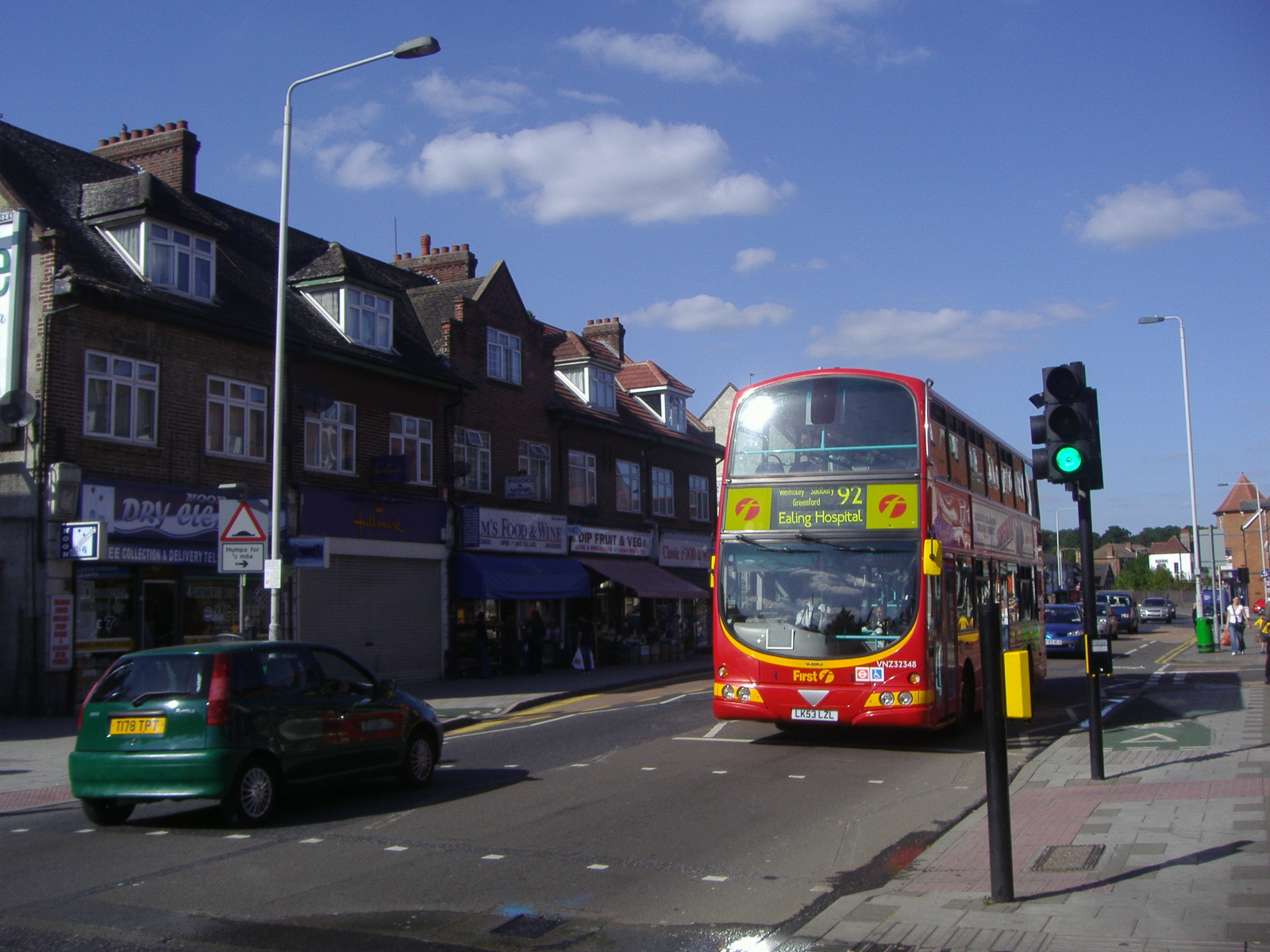
Greenford Road, near the two stations
