= Kenton station =

London Underground and railway station

Kenton
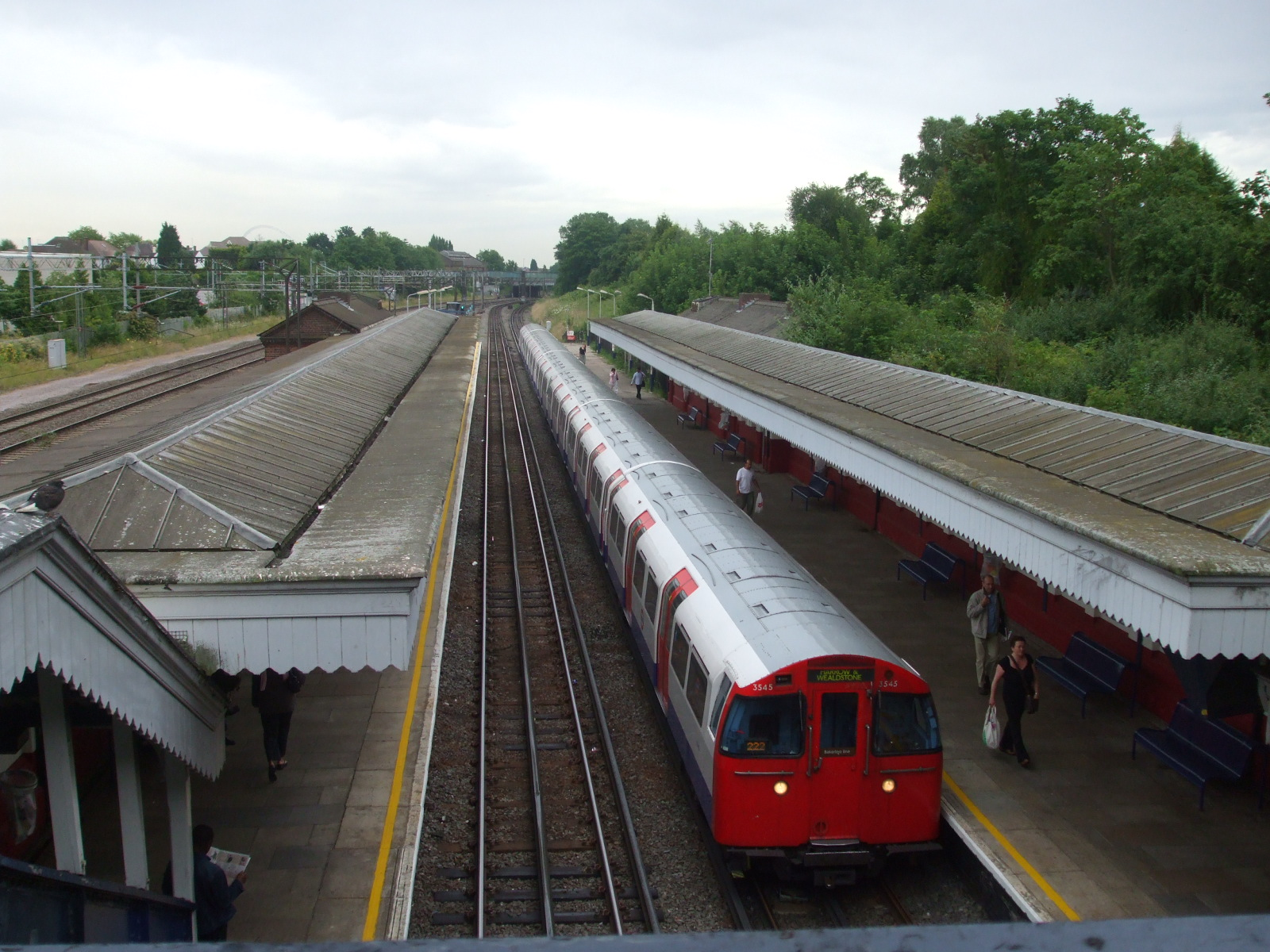
- Northbound Bakerloo line train to Harrow & Wealdstone at Kenton
- Interactive map of Kenton

General information
- Location: Kenton
- Local authority: London Borough of Brent
- Managed by: London Underground
- Owner: Network Rail
- Station code: KNT
- DfT category: E
- Number of platforms: 2
- Fare zone: 4
- OSI: Northwick Park

London Underground annual entry and exit
- 2020: ▼1.56 million
- 2021: ▼0.95 million
- 2022: ▲1.52 million
- 2023: 1.52 million
- 2024: ▲1.73 million

National Rail annual entry and exit
- 2020–21: ▼0.514 million
- 2021–22: ▲0.939 million
- 2022–23: ▲1.077 million
- 2023–24: ▲1.158 million
- 2024–25: ▲1.435 million

Key dates
- 15 June 1912: Opened

Other information
- External links: TfL station info page; Departures; Facilities
- Coordinates: 51.5821°N 0.3172°W

Kenton is an interchange station situated on Kenton Road in Kenton, north-west London. It is on the Bakerloo line of the London Underground and the Lioness line of the London Overground, between Harrow & Wealdstone and South Kenton stations. It also has an out-of-station interchange with Northwick Park tube station on the London Underground's Metropolitan line.

== History ==
The station was one of several built on the London and North Western Railway's New Line from Camden to Watford Junction which enabled local services from Watford Junction station to reach Euston station and Broad Street station in London. The New Line was mostly alongside main line of the London and Birmingham Railway in 1837.

Kenton station was opened on 15 June 1912. It has only ever had platforms on the New Line; parallel main line services call at Harrow and Wealdstone station, one stop to the north, with some also calling at Wembley Central station, three stops to the south.

Bakerloo line services began on 16 April 1917. On 24 September 1982, Bakerloo line services to Kenton ended when services north of Stonebridge Park were ended. The closure was short-lived, and the Bakerloo line service was reinstated on 4 June 1984.

The station's former coal yard on the east side of the railway, no longer needed for the trains, is now occupied by a Sainsbury's supermarket.

== Services ==
- London Overground (Lioness line) - four trains per hour in each direction.
- London Underground (Bakerloo line) - four trains per hour in each direction.

== Connections ==
London Buses routes 114, 183, 223, H9, H10, H18, H19 and SL10 serve the station.

Preceding station	London Overground	Following station
Harrow & Wealdstone towards Watford Junction	Lioness line Watford DC line	South Kenton towards Euston
Preceding station	London Underground	Following station
Harrow & Wealdstone Terminus	Bakerloo line	South Kenton towards Elephant & Castle
