= The Windermere, South Kenton =

Pub in South Kenton, London

Windermere
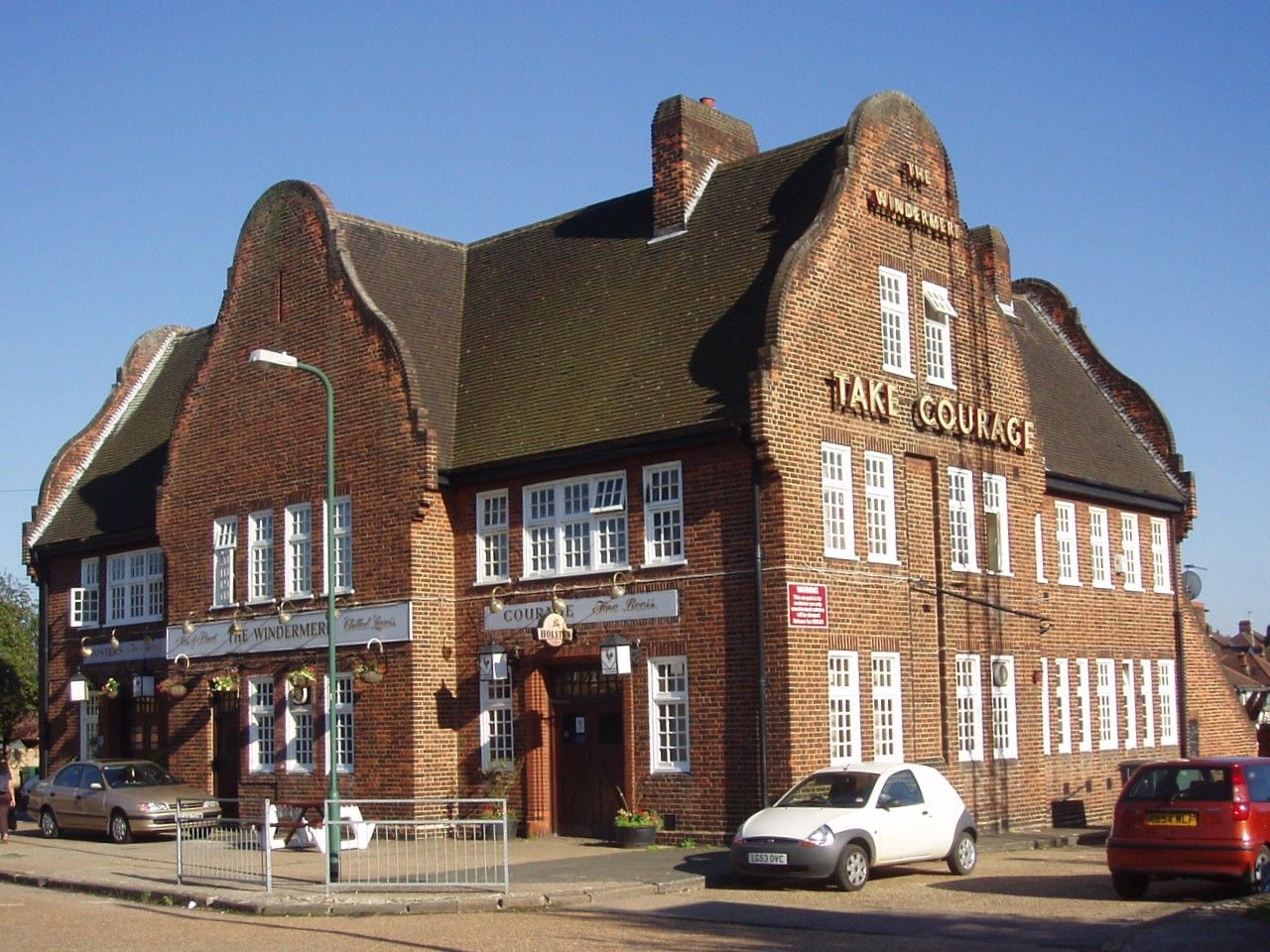
- The Windermere

- Location within London Borough of Brent Location within Greater London

General information
- Location: Windermere Avenue, South Kenton, London, England
- Coordinates: 51.5705°N 0.3078°W
- Completed: 1938

Design and construction
- Designations

Listed Building – Grade II
- Official name: Windermere Public House
- Designated: 15 May 2003
- Reference no.: 1350348

The Windermere is a Grade II listed public house located on Windermere Avenue, South Kenton, London. It was built in circa 1938 and gained Grade II status on 14 May 2003. The Windermere is on the Campaign for Real Ale's National Inventory of Historic Pub Interiors.
