= Silverlink =

Former British train operating company

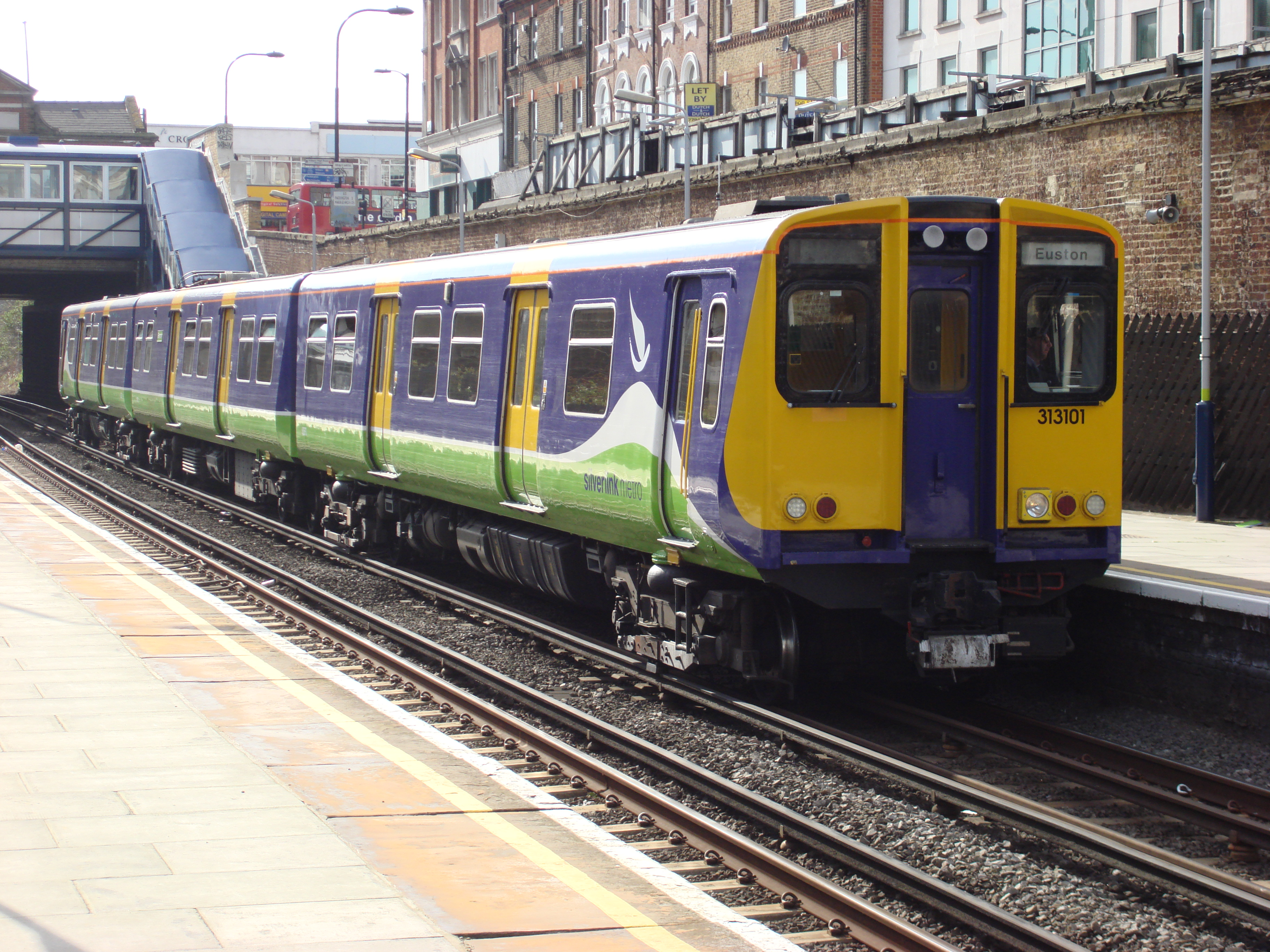
- Class 313 at Kilburn High Road in 2007

Overview
- Franchises: North London Railways; 2 March 1997 – 10 November 2007
- Main region: Greater London
- Other regions: Bedfordshire, Buckinghamshire, Hertfordshire, Northamptonshire
- Fleet: 67
- Stations called at: 88
- Parent company: National Express
- Reporting mark: SS
- Successors: London Overground; London Midland

Other
- Website: Archived website

Silverlink was a British train operating company owned by National Express that operated the North London Railways franchise from March 1997 until November 2007. At the end of 2007, Silverlink Metro services were taken over by London Overground and Silverlink County services were taken over by London Midland.

== History ==
The North London Railways franchise was awarded to National Express on 7 February 1997. National Express commenced operating the franchise on 3 March 1997.

After initially trading as North London Railways, in September 1997 the franchise was rebranded as Silverlink.

The franchise was due to finish on 15 October 2006, but on 11 August 2006 the Department for Transport granted an extension until 10 November 2007. Upon its closure, its London metro services were taken over by London Overground and the remainder were merged with Central Trains' western services to form London Midland.

== Branding ==
Silverlink had two sub-brands:

Silverlink Metro was used for services primarily within Greater London:

- North Woolwich – Richmond (the North London Line)
- Willesden Junction – Clapham Junction (the West London Line)
- London Euston – Watford Junction via Willesden Junction (the Watford DC line)
- Gospel Oak – Barking (the Gospel Oak to Barking Line)

Silverlink County was used for services beyond Greater London:

- London Euston – Northampton (Birmingham New Street until 2004)
- Watford Junction – St Albans Abbey (the St Albans Abbey Line)
- Bletchley – Bedford (the Marston Vale Line)

=== Silverlink Metro ===
Silverlink Metro operated these services.

Note: Changes during the franchise period are noted but changes to the lines before and after the franchise are not.

==== North London line ====
These services ran on the North London line:

Richmond (interchange for District line)
Kew Gardens (interchange for District line)
Gunnersbury (interchange for District line)
South Acton
Acton Central
Willesden Junction (interchange for Bakerloo line, West London line and Watford DC Line)
Kensal Rise
Brondesbury Park
Brondesbury
West Hampstead (interchange for Jubilee line and First Capital Connect)
Finchley Road & Frognal
Hampstead Heath
Gospel Oak (interchange for Gospel Oak to Barking line)
Kentish Town West
Camden Road
Caledonian Road & Barnsbury
Highbury & Islington (interchange for Victoria line)
Canonbury
Dalston Kingsland
Hackney Central
Homerton
Hackney Wick
Stratford (interchange for Central line, Jubilee line, Docklands Light Railway, c2c (limited services - early morning, late night and during engineering works only) and National Express East Anglia)
West Ham †
Canning Town †
Custom House †
Silvertown †
North Woolwich †

† At the end of service on Saturday 9 December 2006 the line between Stratford and North Woolwich closed, as much of the route was duplicated by the Docklands Light Railway and the Jubilee line, leaving Stratford as the eastern terminus of the North London Line.

==== West London line ====
These services ran via the West London line:

Willesden Junction (interchange for North London Line, Watford DC Line and Bakerloo line)
Kensington (Olympia) (interchange for District line and Southern)
West Brompton (interchange for District line and Southern)
Clapham Junction (interchange for South West Trains and Southern)

Shepherd's Bush on the West London Line was due to open under the franchise (with signage in Silverlink colours installed), but platform widening work meant that it finally opened in September 2008 under London Overground management, the signage being replaced with the London Overground roundels by that time.

==== Watford DC line ====
These services ran on the Watford DC line:

London Euston (interchange for Northern line, Victoria line and Virgin (West Coast Main Line)
South Hampstead
Kilburn High Road
Queen's Park †
Kensal Green †
Willesden Junction † (interchange for North London Line and West London Line)
Harlesden †
Stonebridge Park †
Wembley Central † (interchange for Southern during the peaks)
North Wembley †
South Kenton †
Kenton †
Harrow & Wealdstone † (interchange for Northampton Line and Southern)
Headstone Lane
Hatch End
Carpenders Park
Bushey
Watford High Street
Watford Junction (interchange for Northampton Line, St Albans Abbey Line, Virgin (West Coast Main Line), Southern)

† = also served by the Bakerloo line.

==== Gospel Oak to Barking line ====
These services ran on the Gospel Oak to Barking line:

Gospel Oak (interchange for North London Line)
Upper Holloway
Crouch Hill
Harringay Green Lanes
South Tottenham
Blackhorse Road (interchange for Victoria line)
Walthamstow Queens Road
Leyton Midland Road
Leytonstone High Road
Wanstead Park
Woodgrange Park
Barking (interchange for District line, Hammersmith & City line and c2c)

=== Silverlink County ===
==== Birmingham/Northampton ====
Birmingham Line services ran on the slow lines of the West Coast Main Line. The service was cut back to Northampton in September 2004, with services north of Northampton being transferred to partner operator Central Trains, and some through services remained. (Central Trains, like Silverlink, was a subsidiary of National Express and the operations shared rolling stock.)

London Euston (interchange for Watford DC Line and Virgin Trains West Coast and First ScotRail sleeper service)
Harrow & Wealdstone (interchange for Watford DC Line and Southern (via West London Line) )
Bushey
Watford Junction (interchange for Watford DC Line, St Albans Abbey Line, Virgin Trains and Southern)
Kings Langley
Apsley
Hemel Hempstead
Berkhamsted
Tring
Cheddington
Leighton Buzzard
Bletchley (interchange for Marston Vale Line)
Milton Keynes Central (interchange/terminus for Southern, interchange with Virgin Trains)
Wolverton
Northampton

Prior to 2004 the service also continued to Birmingham, calling at the following stations:

Long Buckby
Rugby
Coventry
Birmingham International
Birmingham New Street

==== Abbey Line ====
These services ran on the Abbey Line

Watford Junction (interchange for Northampton/Birmingham services, Virgin West Coast, Watford DC Line and Southern)
Watford North
Garston
Bricket Wood
How Wood
Park Street
St Albans Abbey

==== Marston Vale line ====
These services ran on the Marston Vale line between Bedford and Bletchley:

Bletchley (interchange for Northampton Line)
Fenny Stratford
Bow Brickhill
Woburn Sands
Aspley Guise
Ridgmont
Lidlington
Millbrook
Stewartby
Kempston Hardwick
Bedford St Johns
Bedford (interchange for First Capital Connect and Midland Mainline)

== Performance ==
Silverlink was categorised as a London and South East operator by the Office for Rail Regulation (ORR) and was one of the best performing TOCs in this sector with a PPM (Public Performance Measure) of 90.8% for the last quarter of the financial year 2006/7. Despite these figures, the Silverlink Metro franchise on the North London Line was regarded by frequent travellers as offering a poor service, with extremely congested trains and an unreliable service with some trains cancelled shortly before they were due to arrive. A London Assembly report said passengers found the service "shabby, unreliable, unsafe and overcrowded".

== Rolling stock ==
Silverlink inherited a fleet of Class 117 and Class 121 diesel multiple units, and Class 313 and Class 321 electric multiple units, from British Rail.

To replace the elderly Class 117s and 121s, which operated the Gospel Oak - Barking and Bletchley - Bedford services, seven Class 150 Sprinters were transferred from Central Trains in summer 1999; an eighth followed in 2006. Pending the Sprinters' arrival, Silverlink hired Class 31 locomotives from Fragonset to top and tail Mark 2 carriages on Bletchley - Bedford services in 1998/99.

The Class 313s operated Metro services on the electrified routes; they were joined on the Euston - Watford Junction service in 2003 by three Class 508s transferred from Merseyrail. The Class 321s operated County services to Northampton and Birmingham; they were joined in 2005 by new Class 350s. The Watford Junction - St Albans Abbey service was operated for many years by Class 313s, but latter was usually operated by Class 321s with Silverlink Metro drivers and Silverlink County guards.

On 16 July 2004, Virgin Trains announced that it was withdrawing most of its stops at Milton Keynes Central, which were used by up to 6,000 passengers a day. Commuters became unhappy at the prospect of switching to older Silverlink trains, and a longer journey. Silverlink countered this with the temporary usage of ex-Virgin stock, still in Virgin colours.

The Strategic Rail Authority decided to divert thirty four-carriage Siemens Desiro trains from an order placed by South West Trains to provide stock with faster acceleration for the West Coast Main Line operators. These trains, the Class 350s, were not allocated to a specific operator, but were instead used jointly by Silverlink and Central Trains, both owned by National Express.

Pending the arrival of these trains, from September 2004 Silverlink introduced two sets of Mark 3 carriages, formerly of Virgin Trains, hauled by Virgin Class 87 and EWS Class 90 electric locomotives on peak-hour Northampton services. Additionally, five Class 321s were hired from One, another National Express-owned operator.

=== Fleet ===
Class	Image	Type	Top speed		Number	Routes operated	Built	Period used	Notes
Class	Image	Type	mph	km/h	Number	Routes operated	Built	Period used	Notes
121 Bubble Car		DMU	70	112	4	Gospel Oak to Barking Line; Marston Vale Line	1960	1997–2001	Replaced by Class 150s.
150/1 Sprinter		DMU	75	120	8	Gospel Oak to Barking Line; Marston Vale Line	1984–1987	1999–2007	
313/1		EMU	75	120	23	Silverlink Metro: North London Line; West London Line; Watford DC Line	1976–1977	1997–2007	Refurbished between 1997 and 2001.
321/4		EMU	100	160	37	Silverlink County: Northampton Line; St Albans Abbey Line	1989–1990	1997–2007	
350/1 Desiro		EMU	100	160	30	Silverlink County: Northampton Line	2004–2005	2004–2007	Shared use by Central Trains and Silverlink on the southern section of the West Coast Main Line.
508/3		EMU	75	120	3	Silverlink Metro: Watford DC Line	1979–1980	2003–2007	Refurbished 2003.

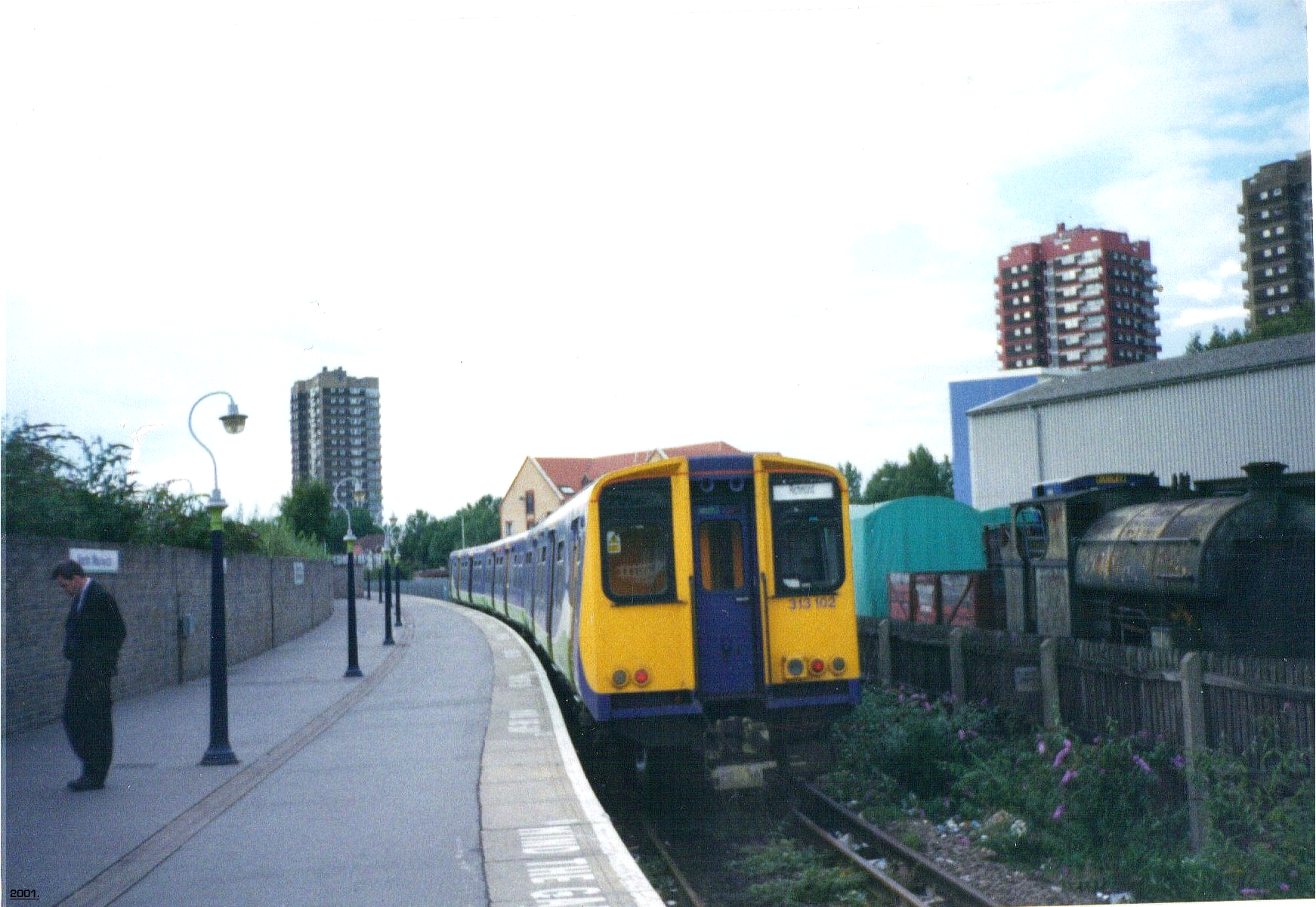
Class 313 at North Woolwich in 2001, closed in 2006.

== Depots ==
Silverlink's fleet was maintained at Bletchley Depot. Following Virgin Trains ceasing to operate electric locomotives, Silverlink's Metro fleet moved to Willesden Depot.

In 2006 Alstom proposed closing Willesden. The depot's closure would have meant the Class 508s would have had to relocate to another depot, and the Class 313s having to return to Bletchley Depot (which was also due to close). On 12 May 2007, Silverlink took over direct running of the depot and its staff for the final six months of its franchise.

== Demise ==
As part of a wider redrawing of the rail franchise map by the Department for Transport, the Silverlink network was to be broken up when it was renewed in November 2007.

The Silverlink Metro services were moved to the control of Transport for London under the banner of the London Overground. On 19 June 2007 Transport for London announced it had awarded the London Overground concession to a Laing Rail/MTR joint venture.

The Silverlink County services were merged with the Central Trains services around Birmingham to create a new West Midlands franchise. On 22 June 2007 the Department for Transport announced it had awarded the West Midlands franchise to Govia.

Silverlink's Metro and County services were transferred to London Overground Rail Operations and London Midland respectively on 11 November 2007.

Preceded by Network SouthEast; As part of British Rail	Operator of North London Railways franchise 1997–2007	Succeeded by London Midland; West Midlands franchise
Preceded by Network SouthEast; As part of British Rail	Operator of North London Railways franchise 1997–2007	Succeeded by London Overground; London Overground concession
