= Hatch End =

Area in London, England

Coordinates: 51.6010°N 0.3743°W

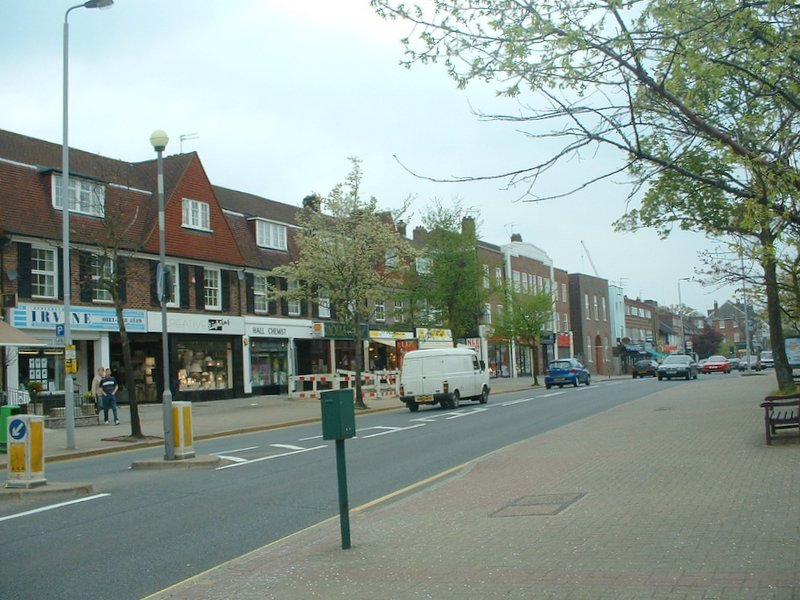
- Hatch End Broadway

- Location within Greater London
- Population: 9,822 (2021 Census. Ward)
- OS grid reference: TQ125915
- London borough: Harrow
- Ceremonial county: Greater London
- Region: London
- Country: England
- Sovereign state: United Kingdom
- Post town: PINNER
- Postcode district: HA5
- Dialling code: 020
- Police: Metropolitan
- Fire: London
- Ambulance: London
- UK Parliament: Ruislip, Northwood and Pinner
- London Assembly: Brent and Harrow

Hatch End is an area of North West London, situated within the London Borough of Harrow. It is located 12.2 miles (19.6 km) north west of Charing Cross.

== Attractions ==
Hatch End is home to Harrow Arts Centre, a complex which centres on the 404-seat Elliott Hall and a 120-seat studio theatre. Music, dance, theatre, film, comedy and literature events are all hosted here, along with many workshops and summer schemes run during the holidays.

The area also features several sports facilities, including Hatch End Swimming Pool, Hatch End Cricket Club and Hatch End Tennis Club. Additionally, the Bannister Stadium & Bannister Sports Centre (containing sports pitches and an athletics track) are located off the Uxbridge Road.

Also of interest is Letchford House on Headstone Lane, a Grade II listed building which was built in 1670.

== Geography ==
Harrow town centre is located to the southeast of Hatch End and is a regional centre for higher order goods, with two shopping malls and a nine-screen cinema, along with numerous restaurants, places of entertainment and bookshops. Pinner town centre, to the southwest, offers many additional amenities and is linked to the area by the frequent H12 bus service. Hatch End is also convenient for Watford, around 4 miles (6.4 km) to the north, which also serves as a regional retail centre. Watford and Hatch End are linked by regular rail services from Hatch End railway station on the London Overground.

== Demographics ==
Using data from the 2001 Census, 74.02% of the population of the Hatch End electoral ward identify as 'white', 18.94% as 'Asian', 3.12% as 'Black', 2.16% as 'mixed', 1.14% as 'Other ethnic group' and 0.61% as Chinese. Christians make up 52.98% of the population of Hatch End. In addition, in common with many other parts of North West London, the area is also home to a sizeable Jewish community; Jews make up 11.38% of the population and Hatch End has a synagogue (and a second in Pinner town centre). The suburb is also home to a Hindu community which represents 11.86% of the population.

The 2011 census showed that 57% of the population was white (48% British, 6% Other, 3% Irish), and 24% Indian.

== Notable residents ==
- David Baddiel, English comedian, novelist and television presenter, has lived in Hatch End.
- Mrs Beeton, the world's first celebrity chef, lived in Hatch End. Her former home site was a successful restaurant called Hatchets and is now a Turkish restaurant called Serrata. A Harrow Heritage Trust brown plaque installed in 1996 commemorates the site.
- George Henry Bolsover, director, School of Slavonic and East European Studies at the University of London from 1947 to 1976.
- Barry Cryer, comedy writer and author, lived in Hatch End.
- Roger Glover, bassist with Deep Purple, started his professional music career with Episode Six, based in Hatch End.
- Marc Haynes, broadcaster and podcaster, grew up in Hatch End.
- David Kemp, former English professional footballer and manager, was born in Hatch End.
- Jessie Matthews, English actress, dancer and singer, lived in Hatch End.
- Mark Ramprakash, cricketer, lived in Hatch End.
- Merlyn Rees, Welsh politician, taught in Harrow Weald Grammar School and lived in Hatch End.
- Dennis Spooner, TV writer, lived on The Avenue in Hatch End.
- Sheree Winton, actress, lived and died in Hatch End.
- Richard Wright, English pianist, keyboardist, singer and songwriter best known for his career with Pink Floyd grew up in Hatch End.

== Healthcare services ==
Hatch End is served by Northwick Park Hospital and specialists St Mark's Hospital and the Royal National Orthopaedic Hospital, which are run by the National Health Service. Due to the large and increasing elderly population in Harrow, and Hatch End in particular, there is also a large public and private provision of homecare services in Harrow.

== Transport and locale ==
=== Rail ===
Hatch End railway station was opened between 1842 and 1844 and is on the London Overground Watford DC Line in London fare zone 6. In normal off-peak conditions it roughly takes three quarters of an hour to Euston railway station and a quarter of an hour to Watford Junction railway station.

=== Main bus routes ===
Route	Start	End	Operator
H14	St. Thomas' Drive, Hatch End	Northwick Park Hospital	London Sovereign for Transport for London
H12	Stanmore Underground Station	South Harrow Bus Station	London Sovereign for Transport for London
R17	Hatch End Station	Carpenders Park Station	Uno for Hertfordshire County Council

=== Nearby places ===
- Harrow Weald
- Wealdstone
- Stanmore
- Northwood
- Pinner
- South Oxhey
