= Headstone Lane railway station =

London Overground station

Headstone Lane
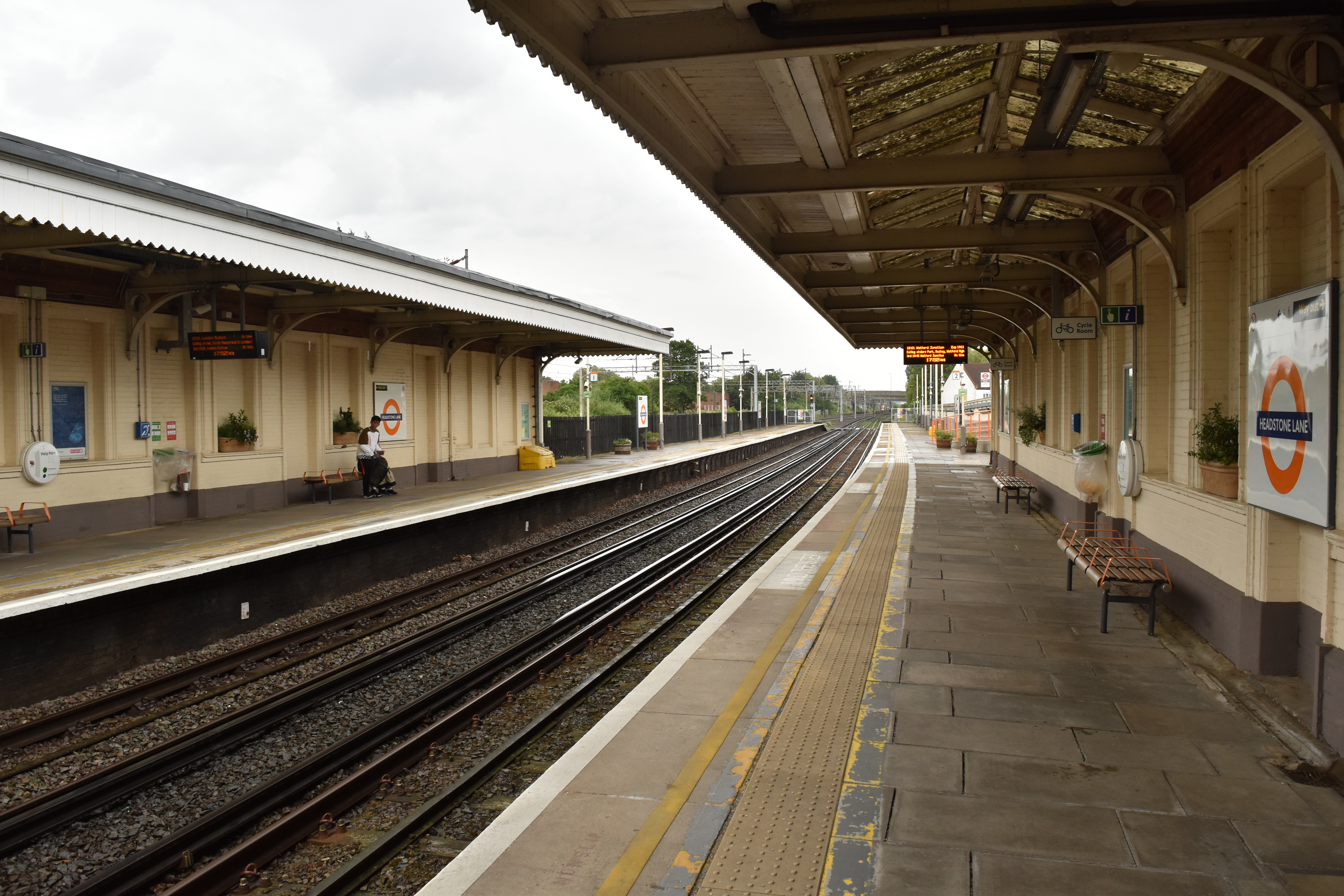
- View from platform 2
- Interactive map of Headstone Lane

General information
- Location: Headstone
- Local authority: London Borough of Harrow
- Managed by: London Overground
- Owner: Network Rail
- Station code: HDL
- DfT category: E
- Number of platforms: 2
- Tracks: 6
- Accessible: Yes (Northbound only)
- Fare zone: 5

National Rail annual entry and exit
- 2020–21: ▼0.173 million
- 2021–22: ▲0.346 million
- 2022–23: ▲0.386 million
- 2023–24: ▲0.437 million
- 2024–25: ▲0.517 million

Railway companies
- Original company: London and North Western Railway
- Pre-grouping: London and North Western Railway
- Post-grouping: London, Midland and Scottish Railway

Key dates
- 10 February 1913: Station opened

Other information
- External links: Departures; Facilities
- Coordinates: 51.6025°N 0.3568°W

Headstone Lane is a London Overground station on the Lioness line, located near Headstone in the London Borough of Harrow. The station is in London fare zone 5.

== Services ==
The typical off-peak service is four trains per hour to London Euston, and four trains to Watford Junction, calling at all stations. The trains to Watford Junction are northbound and are accessed through a gateway and by going down a flight of stairs, whereas the other platform is southbound and is directed towards London Euston. This is accessed by crossing over a bridge and also going down a flight of stairs to reach the platform. On the northbound platform, there is a gate exit which now has an Oyster reader, so passengers can exit through the gate without having to climb the stairs. There are also Oyster readers at the main entrance at the top of the bridge. During the Silverlink era, the gate was rarely opened – however in recent times, London Overground always leaves the gate open.

The station was previously also served by the Bakerloo line of the London Underground between 16 April 1917 and 24 September 1982.

Since the takeover of this station from Silverlink to London Overground the ticket office opening hours have significantly reduced to information only and two ticket machines were installed which has now been reduced to one and offer Oyster Cards facilities, card payments are also accepted.

Preceding station	London Overground	Following station
Hatch End towards Watford Junction	Lioness line Watford DC line	Harrow & Wealdstone towards Euston
Historical railways
Preceding station	London Underground	Following station
Hatch End towards Watford Junction	Bakerloo line (1917–1982)	Harrow & Wealdstone towards Elephant & Castle

== Connections ==
London Buses routes H18 and H19 serve the station.
