= Kensal Green station =

London Underground and London Overground station

Kensal Green
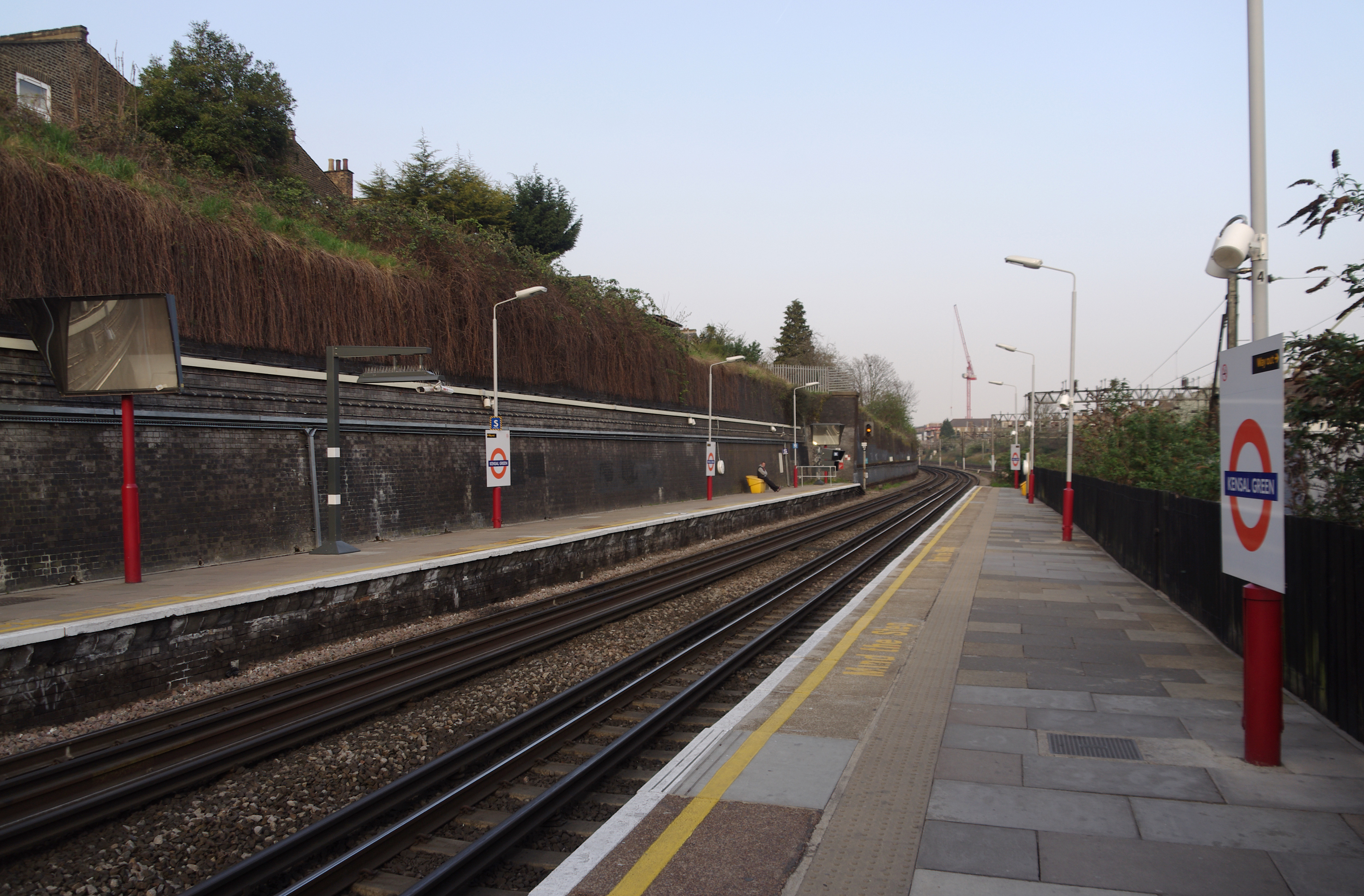
- Northbound platform at the station
- Interactive map of Kensal Green

General information
- Location: Kensal Green
- Local authority: London Borough of Brent
- Managed by: London Underground
- Owner: Network Rail
- Station code: KNL
- DfT category: E
- Number of platforms: 2
- Fare zone: 2

London Underground annual entry and exit
- 2020: ▼1.35 million
- 2021: ▼1.07 million
- 2022: ▲1.81 million
- 2023: ▲1.82 million
- 2024: ▲1.98 million

National Rail annual entry and exit
- 2020–21: ▼0.409 million
- 2021–22: ▲0.843 million
- 2022–23: ▲0.974 million
- 2023–24: ▲1.027 million
- 2024–25: ▼1.000 million

Key dates
- 1 October 1916: Opened (LNWR & Bakerloo)

Other information
- External links: TfL station info page; Departures; Facilities
- Coordinates: 51.530746°N 0.22479°W

Kensal Green is an interchange station in Kensal Green, London. It is on the Bakerloo line of the London Underground and the Lioness line of the London Overground, between Willesden Junction and Queen's Park stations. It is located in College Road, close to the junction with Harrow Road. The station is in a cutting with a tunnel at the western end. It is about 0.5 miles (750m) route distance from the older Kensal Rise station, located to the north east on the Mildmay line of the London Overground.

== History ==
The station opened on 1 October 1916 on the new electrified Watford DC line which runs parallel on the north side of the existing London and North Western Railway (LNWR) tracks from Euston to Watford.

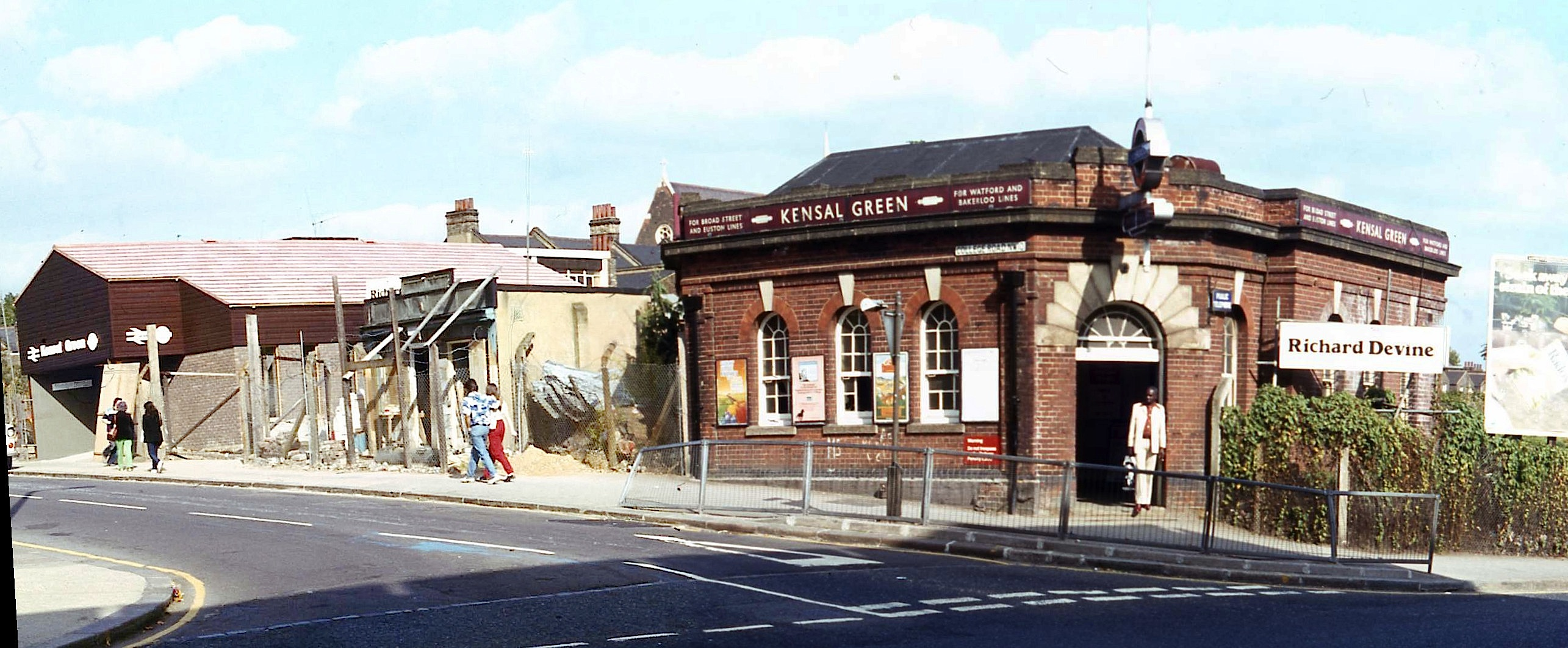
The 1980 station almost complete before closure of the original.

The original station was replaced in 1980.

Bakerloo line services had been running between Queen's Park and Willesden Junction since 10 May 1915.

Since November 2007, services serving Kensal Green have been operated by London Overground under contract to Transport for London; with the station managed by London Underground.

The station was in the news early in 2006, as it was the last station visited by Thomas ap Rhys Pryce before he was murdered in a robbery in Kensal Green. The two main suspects had also visited the station that same night, a short time before the murder, and mugged a man on the platform. A suspect also tried to use Pryce's Oyster card a day after the incident at the station, and was picked up on CCTV, aiding the police investigation.

This incident sparked a major public discussion on station safety and security, mainly because the station was un-staffed when the passenger was mugged. The only security present was CCTV cameras, and the ticket barriers were left open allowing the suspects to enter the station freely. Many high-profile politicians spoke on the issue of station safety and called on train companies to provide security or staff the station until the last train had left the station.

The Mayor of London at the time, Ken Livingstone, became personally involved in this, and publicly attacked Silverlink, the then operator of the station, for not providing staffing or security throughout the station's opening hours. He also stated that any company that wanted to bid for the subsidy to run the train line would have commit to staffing the station until the last train had left. Eventually, towards the last quarter of 2006, Silverlink hired a private security firm to patrol the station, and also had speakers installed in the ticket hall to deter gangs of youths from loitering.

== 1986 collision ==
On 16 October 1986, a London Underground 1959 Stock train operating service 2A18 was struck from the rear by British Rail service 2C38, a British Rail Class 313, just north of Kensal Green tunnel. The collision injured 23 passengers and caused severe damage to the rear cars of the Underground train. The Department of Transport investigation found that a faulty aspect displayed at signal KG8 caused the driver of 2C38 to proceed when it was unsafe.

== Connections ==
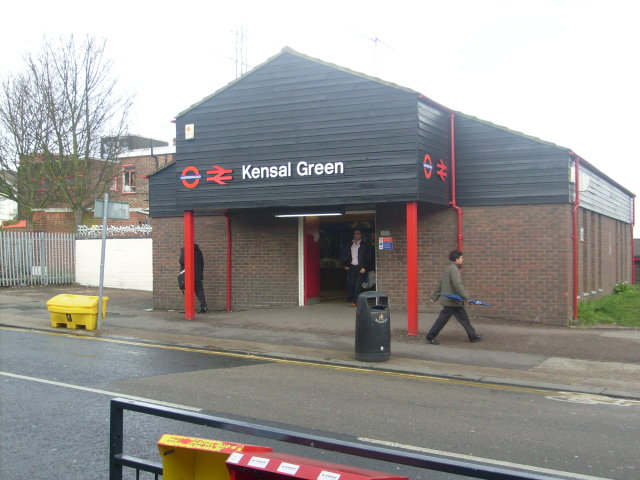
Kensal Green station

London Buses route 18 and night routes N18 and N118 serve the station.

== See also ==
- Kensal Rise railway station
- Murder of Tom ap Rhys Pryce

Preceding station	London Overground	Following station
Willesden Junction towards Watford Junction	Lioness line Watford DC line	Queen's Park towards Euston
Preceding station	London Underground	Following station
Willesden Junction towards Harrow & Wealdstone	Bakerloo line	Queen's Park towards Elephant & Castle
Future services
Preceding station	London Underground	Following station
Old Oak Common towards Harrow & Wealdstone	Bakerloo line	Queen's Park towards Elephant & Castle
