= Croxley Green Light Maintenance Depot =

Disused railway maintenance depot in Croxley, Watford

- Interactive map of Croxley Green Light Maintenance Depot

Location
- Location: Croxley, Watford
- Coordinates: 51.6467°N 0.3968°W
- OS grid: TQ110954

Characteristics
- Owner: British Rail
- Depot code: CG (1973 - 1985)
- Type: EMU

History
- Opened: 1917
- Closed: 1985

Croxley Green Light Maintenance Depot was a traction maintenance depot located in Croxley, Watford, England that provided storage and light maintenance for electric multiple units working the Watford DC line.

The depot was near the triangular junction where the line to the since closed Croxley Green station branch line branched off from the former Watford and Rickmansworth Railway, and both branches met the Watford DC line. The depot tracks left the depot in the westward direction, so empty stock workings from Watford and London would carry along a headshunt before reversing into the car shed. The River Colne flowed under the railway line on two bridges carrying the main line and the depot throat tracks.

== History ==
The depot opened in 1917, around the time of the DC electrification of the line to Watford, Rickmansworth and Croxley Green.

Before its closure in 1985, the depot's allocation consisted of Class 313 and Class 501 EMUs, and the depot was also used for stabling London Underground stock while the Bakerloo line ran to Watford Junction. These trains would run empty along the branch line to the depot.

The depot should not be confused with a proposal to build a depot for the Metropolitan line along the Grand Union Canal between Moor Park and Croxley stations, on a different site.
