= Kilburn High Road railway station =

London Overground station

Kilburn High Road
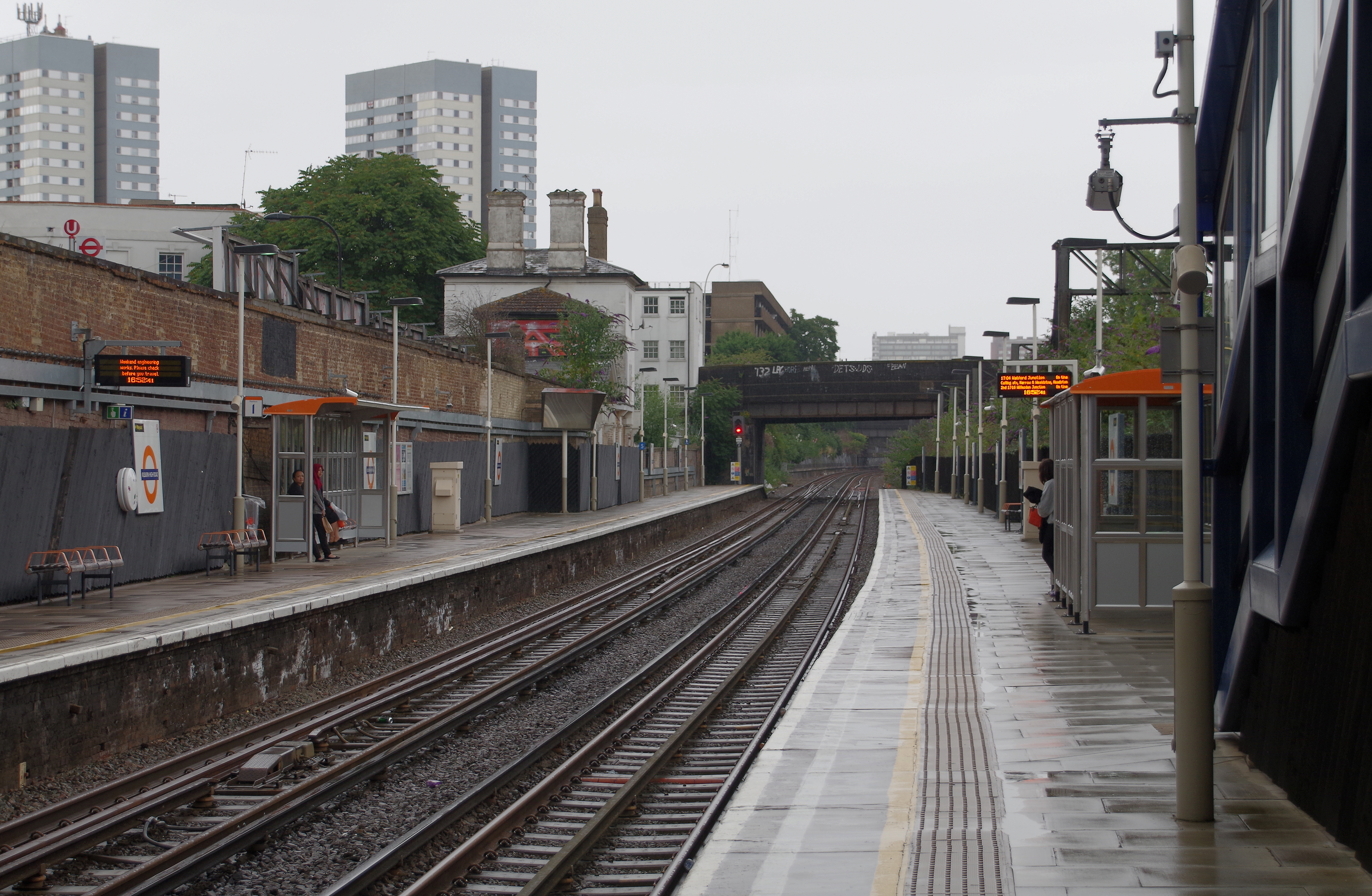
- Interactive map of Kilburn High Road

General information
- Location: Kilburn
- Local authority: London Borough of Camden
- Managed by: London Overground
- Owner: Network Rail
- Station code: KBN
- DfT category: E
- Number of platforms: 2
- Fare zone: 2

National Rail annual entry and exit
- 2020–21: ▼0.320 million
- 2021–22: ▲0.587 million
- 2022–23: ▲0.642 million
- 2023–24: ▲0.661 million
- 2024–25: ▲0.758 million

Key dates
- 1852: Opened

Other information
- External links: Departures; Facilities
- Coordinates: 51.5374°N 0.1919°W

Kilburn High Road is a London Overground station on the Lioness line, situated near the south end of the Kilburn High Road in the London Borough of Camden.

== History ==
Kilburn High Road railway station was opened in 1852 as Kilburn and Maida Vale station by the London and North Western Railway (LNWR) on its existing line out of Euston station, to serve the newly developed suburbs of Kilburn and Maida Vale to the south. In the Victorian era it became an important commuter station served by North London Railway trains running into Broad Street station.

At the beginning of the 20th century the station had platforms on all four lines of the West Coast Main Line out of Euston, but with the construction of the Watford DC line the local service took over the slow main line platforms, the slow (semi-fast) main line services were diverted through what had been the fast main line platforms and the fast main lines were moved southward.

In 1915 Kilburn Park tube station was opened a little to the south on the Bakerloo Line extension from Paddington, drawing its passengers from a similar catchment area to Kilburn High Road station and providing a quicker connection with the West End.

The slow (previously fast) main line platforms were almost entirely demolished during the electrification of the West Coast Main Line, with the last platform building disappearing in the 1980s when the LNWR platform canopies were removed. The current footbridge and street-level buildings are not so much the result of modernisation but of three or four major fires which have occurred here since the early 1970s.

== Services ==
The off-peak service on all days of the week in trains per hour is:

- 4 tph to London Euston
- 4 tph to Watford Junction

Preceding station	London Overground	Following station
Queen's Park towards Watford Junction	Lioness line Watford DC line	South Hampstead towards Euston

== Use by London Underground ==
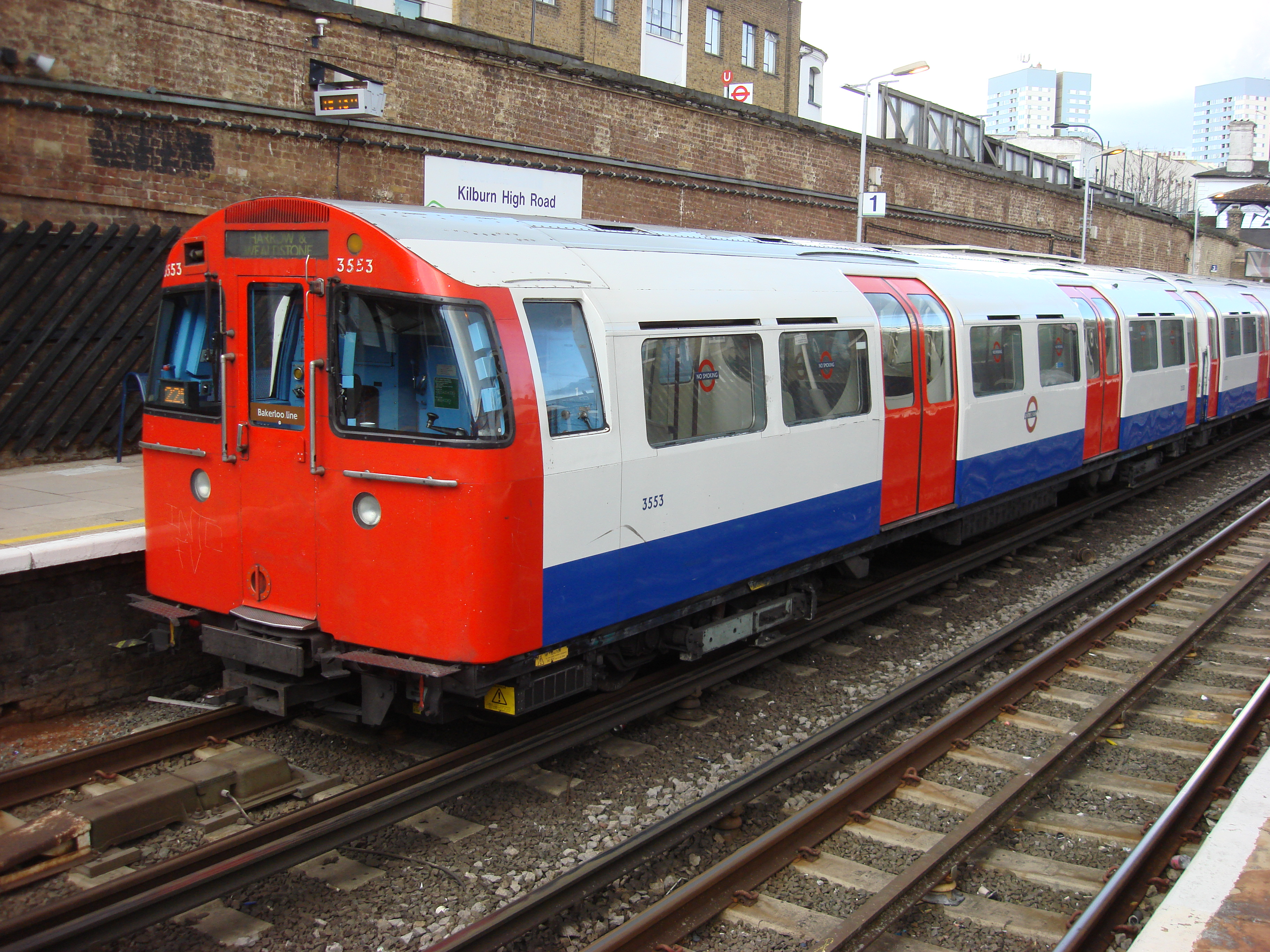
A Bakerloo line 1972 Stock train at Kilburn High Road station

The station is occasionally used as a reversing point on the London Underground (LU) network by out-of-service Bakerloo line trains when they cannot enter the LU platforms at Queens Park station due to planned engineering work or failures, and/or are prevented from reversing in the Up DC line platform there. The fourth rail (bonded to the traction current return rail) continues towards Kilburn High Road to permit these movements, but the carrying of passengers to Kilburn High Road by LU tube trains is not permitted as the platform height is matched to National Rail trains (platforms on this line north of Queens Park station are positioned at a "transition" height which is higher than that for normal LU platforms and lower than NR platforms). There are also one or two "rusty rail" journeys made by LU trains each day to keep the fourth rail clean for the relatively infrequent unscheduled diverted LU trains. Kilburn High Road appears on non-public internal LU maps and documents for this purpose.

== Connections ==
London Buses routes 16, 31, 32, 98, 206, 316, 328 and 632 and night routes N28, N31, N32 and N98 serve the station.
