= Watford DC line =

Railway in southern England

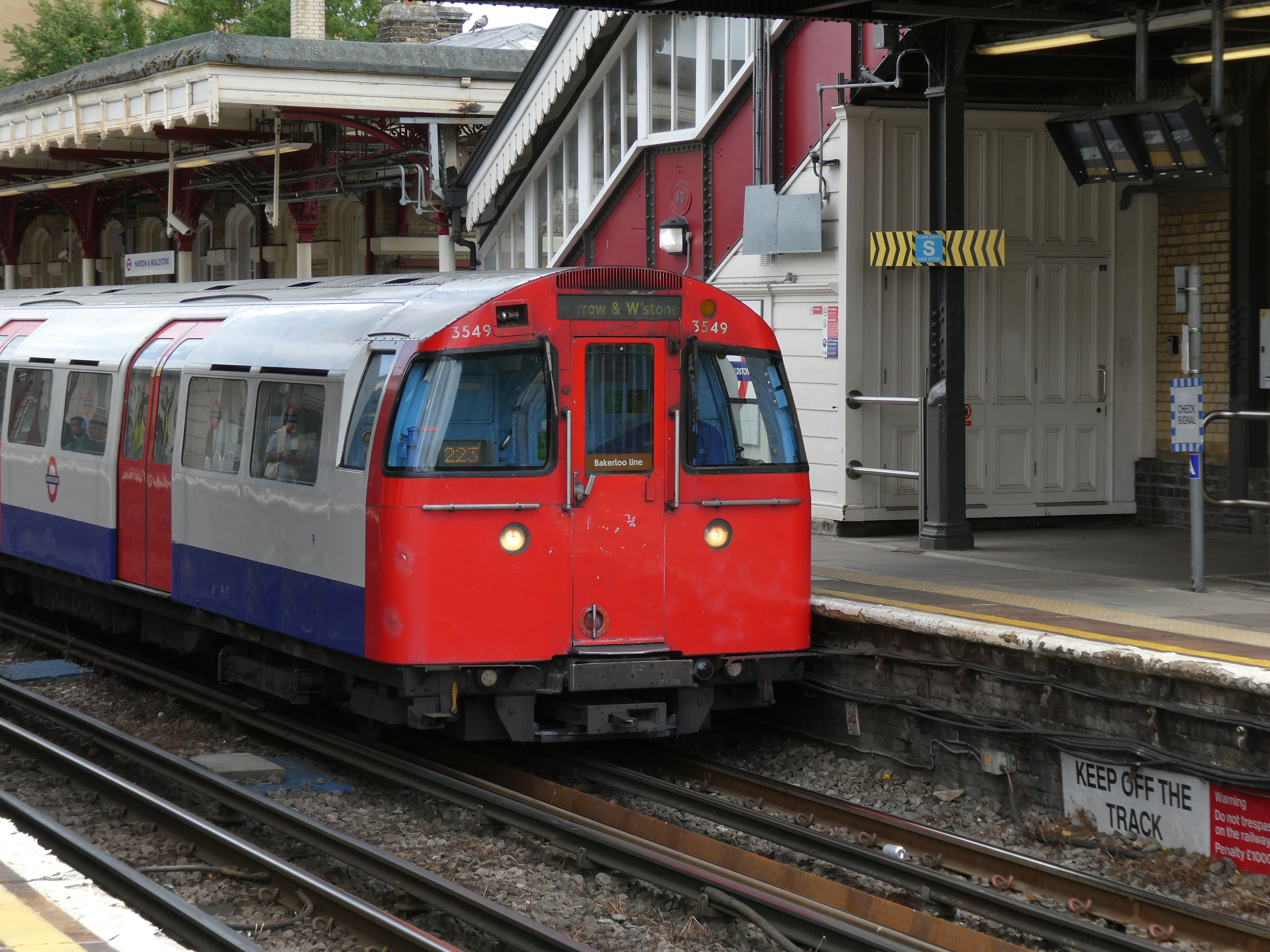
- 1972 Stock at Harrow and Wealdstone in 2025

Overview
- Status: Operational
- Owner: Network Rail
- Locale: Greater London; Hertfordshire
- Termini: London Euston; Watford Junction
- Stations: 19

Service
- Type: Rapid transit; suburban rail
- System: London Overground; London Underground
- Operator: Transport for London
- Depots: Stonebridge Park; Willesden
- Rolling stock: Overground: Class 378 / Class 710; Underground: 1972 Stock

Technical
- Number of tracks: Two
- Track gauge: 1,435 mm (4 ft 8 1/2 in) standard gauge
- Electrification: Third rail, 750 V DC; Fourth rail, 750 V DC (Bakerloo line)
Route map
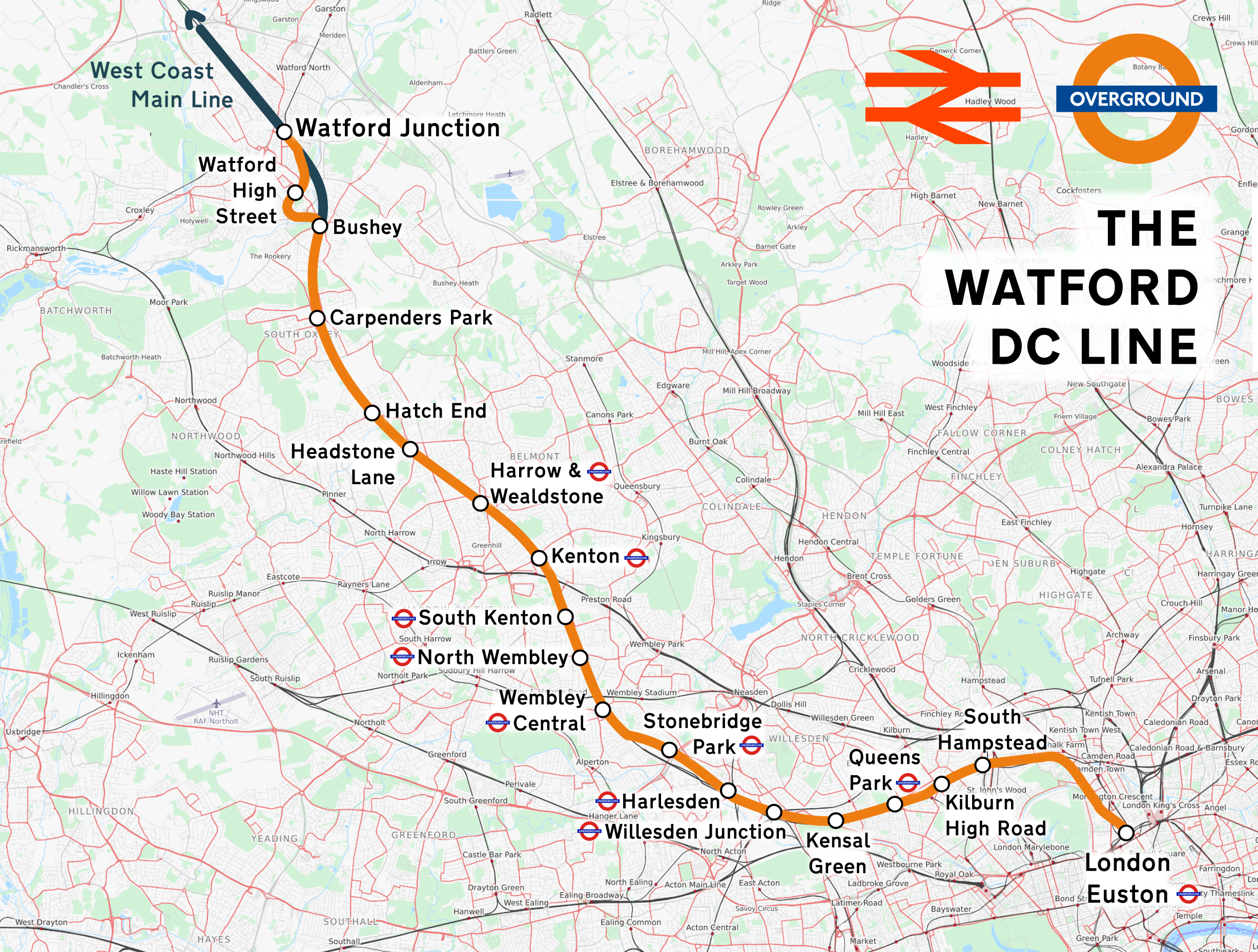
(Click to expand)

The Watford DC line is a suburban railway line in Greater London and Hertfordshire running between London Euston and Watford Junction. The line is shared by services on London Underground's above-ground section of the Bakerloo line between Harrow & Wealdstone and Queen's Park, and London Overground's Lioness line which runs over its entire length.

The line runs beside the West Coast Main Line (WCML) for most of its length. The rolling stock used on the line are the London Overground Class 710 "Aventras" made by Bombardier and the London Underground 1972 Stock.

The Watford New Line was opened in stages by the London and North Western Railway from 15 June 1912 as part of a wider scheme of suburban capacity improvement and electrification. Delayed by World War I, full electric service from Watford Junction to Euston commenced on 10 July 1922.

The "DC" in the title refers to line being electrified using direct current. This was done in the early 20th century with conductor rails to be compatible with the four-rail system used by the Underground and, at the time, the North London Line; currently, the line uses a third rail system, with a fourth rail available on the section shared with the Bakerloo line. By contrast, the WCML uses overhead alternating current.

== History ==
The London and North Western Railway (LNWR) drew up a plan in 1907 to widen their line between Watford and Kilburn and continue on to Euston in tube tunnel. This was superseded in 1911 by a more ambitious plan that included new lines on the surface from Watford to Chalk Farm, electrification of this and other lines and linking up with the Bakerloo line.

=== Local relief line ===
The Watford New Line was opened in phases. The section of double track between Willesden Junction and Harrow & Wealdstone opened on 15 June 1912 and was used for local steam train traffic. The new stations at Harlesden, Stonebridge Park, North Wembley and Kenton opened on 15 June 1912. (Note: New platforms were also provided on the new line at the existing Wembley station.)

The section of new line between Harrow & Wealdstone and Watford High Street opened on 10 February 1913, with a new station at Headstone Lane. Local steam trains were now able to use the new line between Watford Junction and Willesden Junction. (Note: The line between Watford High Street and Watford Junction used the Watford and Rickmansworth Railway tracks.) The existing station at Watford High Street received direct services to London for the first time. The opening of this section of line coincided with the beginning of service at Croxley Green and Watford West stations on the Croxley Green branch line.

=== Electric service ===
Queen's Park station became the northern terminus of the Bakerloo line on 11 February 1915. The station was due to open with Kilburn Park and Warwick Avenue stations on 31 January 1915 but was delayed because of World War I.

The Bakerloo line was extended from Queen's Park to Willesden Junction on 10 May 1915. Kensal Green station, between Queen's Park and Willesden Junction, opened on 1 October 1916 for Bakerloo line service.

On 10 December 1916, trial electric services were run between Willesden Junction and Watford Junction. The Bakerloo line service was extended from Willesden Junction to Watford Junction on Monday 16 April 1917. The service over this section initially ran every 15 minutes on Monday to Saturday with a skip-stop service at peak times. On Sunday trains terminated at Willesden.

The final section of new line was constructed between Queen's Park and Chalk Farm, with two platforms provided at Euston for electric trains. LNWR electric service from Broad Street and Euston to Watford Junction commenced on Monday 10 July 1922, following a trial service on 7 July 1922. Service that had been withdrawn in 1917 was reinstated at South Hampstead, Kilburn and Chalk Farm stations. The introduction of all electric service on the line decreased the journey time for Bakerloo trains by three minutes. Peak services ran every 15 minutes from Watford Junction to Euston, Watford Junction to Broad Street and Watford Junction to Elephant and Castle. At off-peak times the Euston and Broad Street services ran every half hour.

=== Signalling ===
The line opened with conventional semaphore signalling mechanically operated from signal boxes at each station, this system remained in use after electrification.

The London, Midland and Scottish Railway introduced an automatic electric signalling system in the early 1930s over most of the route and some signal boxes were abolished. A similar system was also used for a shorter period between Bromley-by-Bow and Upminster now part of the District line. The very closely spaced mix of automatic and semi-automatic signals, repeater signals, and auxiliary calling-on aspects was intended to let trains to proceed, after a set delay, at low speed past "failed" signals on track with no junctions without the need to contact a signalman, but this could lead to a nose-to-tail queue of trains as they all reached the location of a real line blockage.

Train stops were provided (except at repeater signals) to allow London Electric Railway (LER) trains to operate over the line without the special provision of a second man; this enabled the same practice to be continued with all other Underground and main line stock subsequently allocated to this line and which was provided with trip equipment.

Signal boxes remaining in use in the early 1970s included:

- Kilburn High Road (closed when the crossover moved to the down side of the station)
- Queen's Park No.3 (closed when control passed to Willesden)
- Willesden New Station
- Stonebridge Power House (abolished after LU Bakerloo line depot opened)
- Harrow No.2

Normally Kilburn High Road and Stonebridge Power House which controlled only plain track with crossovers were switched out and only Queen's Park, Willesden and Harrow boxes were staffed for at least part of the day, to deal with junction and siding traffic. In the early 1980s manual control of signalling was needed for a few months after dragging gear on a train destroyed many electric train-stops which were of a design almost confined to this line (LU train-stops are mostly electro-pneumatic). By this time the signal boxes at Stonebridge Power House and Kilburn High Road had been abolished. Emergency crossovers at other locations were controlled by ground frames enclosed in structures the size of a garden shed.

In 1988, the LMS system was replaced by a more standard system controlled from a new signal box, Willesden Suburban, and the remaining local boxes were abolished. The new system had solid state interlocking, but far fewer signals; as a consequence the maximum traffic capacity of the line was severely reduced. In the early 1960s, there were headways of less than two minutes between Harrow & Wealdstone and Willesden Junction stations, the section of line used by nearly all services.

In the early 2000s, Willesden Suburban was closed and control passed to Wembley Main Line Signalling Centre.

=== Electrification ===
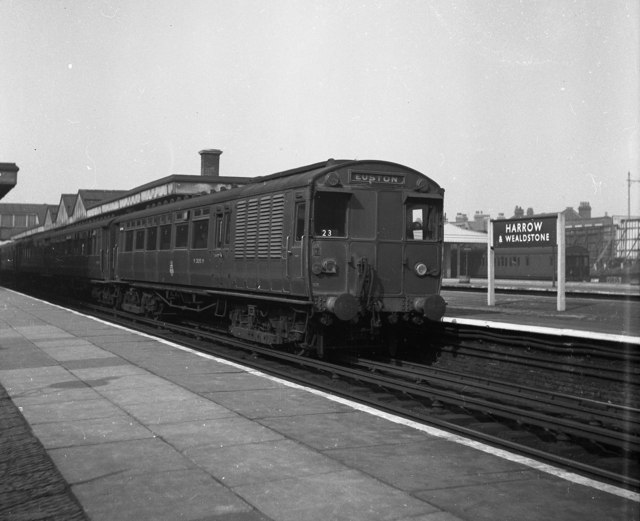
An Oerlikon electric train at Harrow and Wealdstone (1956)

The original electrification was on a fourth rail system, similar to that now used by London Underground, which allowed LER trains to use the new line. Power was supplied from the railway's own power station at Stonebridge Park until the 1960s when it was closed, after which it has been obtained from public supplies. As originally installed, there was provision for interconnection of the high voltage section of the power station to adjacent public supplies for output or intake but this ceased when national supplies were standardised at 50 Hz.

In the late 1950s, the original electric multiple units built for the line were replaced by new Class 501 rolling stock. These were in turn displaced in the mid 1980s by Class 313 units. The line is now operated by London Overground Class 710 "Aventra" units.

In the 1970s, the track and the rolling stock used on this line and the North London Line were changed to use a modified version of the BR standard third rail system, with the fourth rail (now bonded to the running rail used for returning traction current) left in place on the sections of line shared with LU Bakerloo line trains. North of Harrow & Wealdstone, now the limit of LU operation, the fourth rail has in most places been dropped onto the sleepers and remains bonded, thus leaving the resistance of the current return path unaltered. The fourth rail remains in the normal position from Queen's Park to Kilburn High Road up platform, where a trailing crossover between those two stations is maintained in use to allow reversal of Bakerloo line trains unable to gain access to London Underground at Queen's Park, due to planned work or other reasons. The line is currently electrified (like all shared lines) using the standard compromise voltage of 660 V DC. This falls comfortably within the lower permanent voltage limit for the Class 378 "Capitalstar" stock (500 V) and the upper permanent voltage limit for the 1972 tube stock (760 V). The line has now been converted to 750 V DC for the new Class 710 "Aventra".

A consequence of converting to third rail with the fourth rail provided only for LU use was that both planned and emergency use of the line by other third-rail-capable trains was possible. Ignoring recent use of Class 508 trains, this last took place when Class 416 trains were diverted to Willesden Junction Low Level station when part of the North London Line was closed for a number of weeks in the late 1980s.

The electricity grid Willesden substation in Acton Lane, Park Royal supplies 11 kV, three-phase power to ten substations on the line, located at Camden, South Hampstead, Queen's Park, Willesden, Harlesden, Wembley, Kenton, Harrow, Hatch End, Bushey and Watford.

=== Decline ===
Evening services between Queen's Park and Watford Junction were reduced from every 10 minutes to every 15 minutes from 17 June 1963, due to a drop in passengers.

During 1965, there was a significant reduction of services with off-peak Bakerloo line trains withdrawn north of Queen's Park and services to Broad Street cut in July.

=== Operators ===
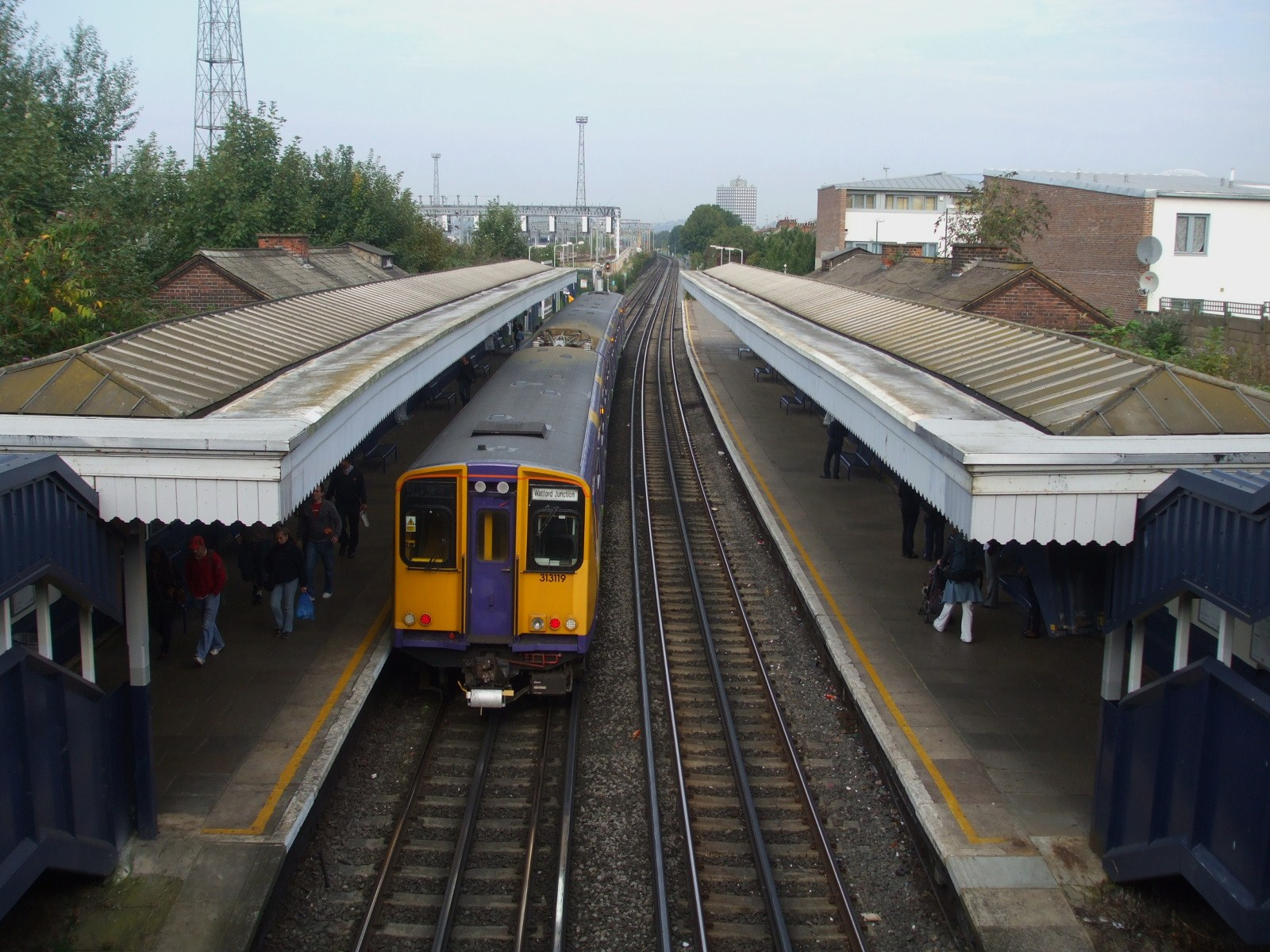
Silverlink Metro Class 313

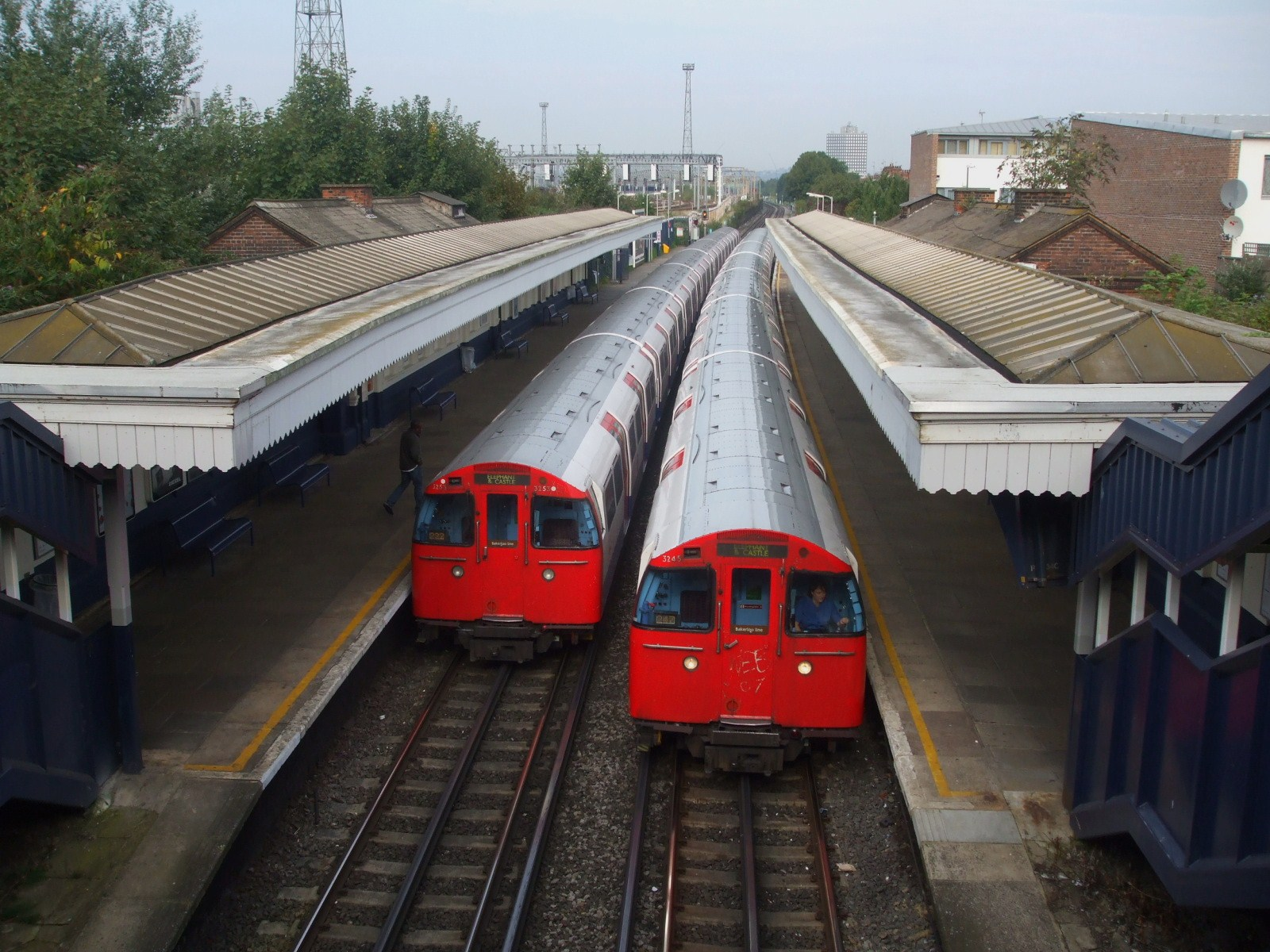
Bakerloo line 1972 Stock

The line is shared with the Bakerloo line, as shown in these 2008 photographs at Harlesden.

The line was operated by British Rail and was part of Network SouthEast from 1986. In June 1988 it was rebranded as the Harlequin line. The name was selected by a competition organised by British Rail. The winning entry, by a commuter from Pinner, was made up of a combination of Hatch End, Harlesden and Queen's Park stations. The rebrand cost £4,000,000 (equivalent to £11,947,378 in 2025) and was launched at Wembley Central station by Ed Stewart, Ian St John and Jimmy Greaves.

In April 1994, in preparation for rail privatisation, the line became part of the North London Railways train operating unit. From March 1997 until November 2007, the line was operated by Silverlink. In November 2007, Transport for London (TfL) took full management control of all the intermediate Watford DC line stations as part of the London Overground (LO) service with staffing during opening hours, automatic ticket gates and planned station refurbishment to the standard of the Tube network.

== Services ==
=== London Overground ===
London Overground operates over the full length of the line from Watford Junction to Euston. In July 2023, TfL announced that it would be giving each of its Overground services, including that on the Watford to Euston route, new names by the end of 2024. In February 2024, TfL announced that the London Overground service on the Watford DC line would be named the Lioness line (to honour the England women's national football team who became European champions at Wembley Stadium in 2022) and would be coloured yellow on the updated network map.

=== London Underground ===
The Bakerloo line of the London Underground operates over part of the line from Harrow & Wealdstone to Queen's Park. From Queen's Park the Bakerloo line branches onto dedicated tracks in tunnel via central London to Elephant and Castle.

=== List of stations ===
- Euston
- South Hampstead
- Kilburn High Road
- Queen's Park
- Kensal Green
- Willesden Junction
- Harlesden
- Stonebridge Park
- Wembley Central
- North Wembley
- South Kenton
- Kenton
- Harrow and Wealdstone
- Headstone Lane
- Hatch End
- Carpenders Park
- Bushey
- Watford High Street
- Watford Junction

=== Discontinued services ===
Past services have included:

- Watford Junction to Liverpool Street peak hours service ran from June 1986 to September 1992.
- Watford Junction (or Bushey & Oxhey or Harrow & Wealdstone) to Broad Street via Hampstead Heath or Primrose Hill
- Croxley Green to Euston or Broad Street
- Croxley Green to Watford Junction
- Watford Junction (or Bushey & Oxhey) to LU Bakerloo line via Queens Park

When the south curve of the triangular junction between Watford High Street and Bushey existed, a few trains used Croxley Depot (now demolished), which was shared by LU and BR trains.

An interchange with the Stanmore branch line once existed at Harrow & Wealdstone. This short branch line was closed in 1964 as part of the Beeching cuts; the empty trackbed is still visible at Harrow & Wealdstone adjacent to the eastern ticket office.

== Abandoned expansion proposals ==
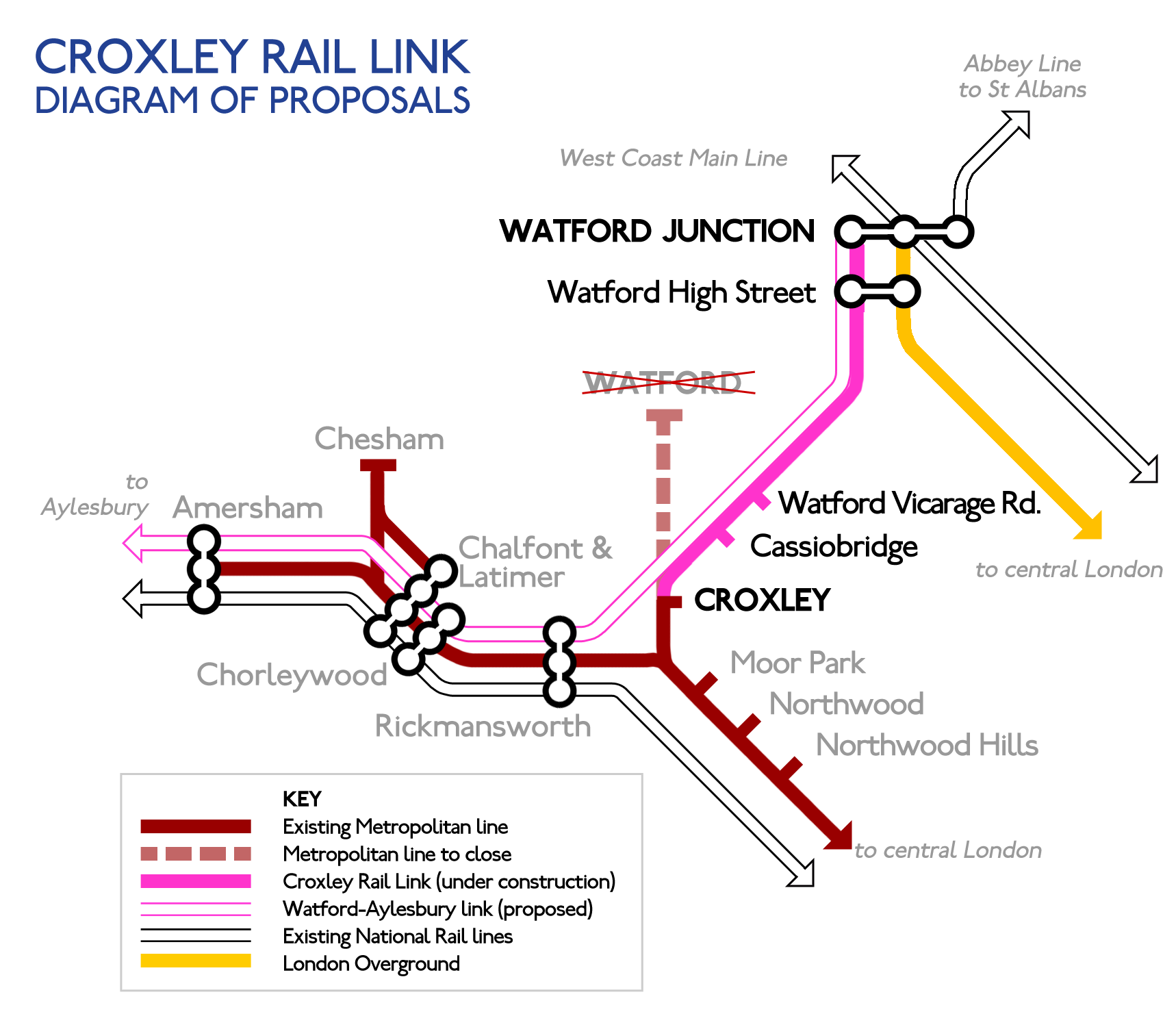
A diagram of the proposed rail services

Another proposal to bring London Underground service to Watford Junction was the Croxley Rail Link, which envisaged diverting the Watford branch of the Metropolitan line along a re-opened stretch of track to the west of Watford, effectively reinstating the former Croxley Green to Watford Junction service. Underground trains would then join the DC line at Watford High Street, potentially forming an interchange either with London Overground or the Bakerloo line, depending on the outcome of other projects. Funding for this project was agreed during November 2015, however after cost overruns and disagreements over funding sources, work on the project stopped in 2017, and it was confirmed in 2018 that the project would not be going ahead in its current form.
