= Bushey railway station =

Railway station in Hertfordshire, England

Bushey
- Interactive map of Bushey

General information
- Location: Oxhey
- Local authority: Borough of Watford
- Managed by: London Overground
- Owner: Network Rail
- Station code: BSH
- DfT category: E
- Number of platforms: 6
- Fare zone: 8

National Rail annual entry and exit
- 2020–21: ▼0.368 million
- 2021–22: ▲0.826 million
- 2022–23: ▲1.001 million
- 2023–24: ▲1.157 million
- 2024–25: ▲1.225 million

Key dates
- 1841: Opened
- 1982: Bakerloo Line discontinued
- 2007: London Overground started

Other information
- External links: Departures; Facilities
- Coordinates: 51.644°N 0.385°W

Bushey is an interchange station in Hertfordshire which serves Bushey and Oxhey. It is located on an embankment where the Watford DC line, operated as the Lioness line of the London Overground, diverges from the West Coast Main Line (WCML). National Rail services along the WCML are operated by London Northwestern Railway. It is in London fare zone 8. It is 15 miles 79 chains (25.7 km) from London Euston.

== History ==
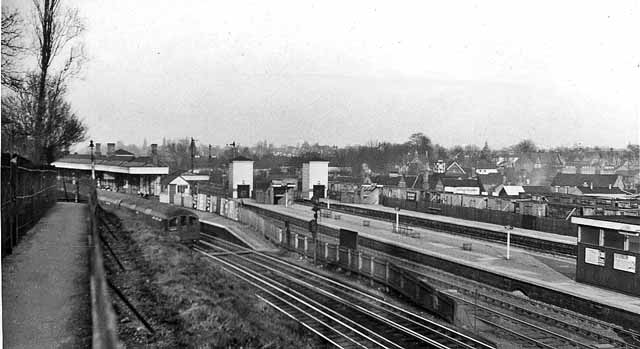
View northward, towards Watford Junction in 1962

The London and Birmingham Railway first ran through here on 20 July 1837. A station was not initially provided, as the area was then sparsely populated.

A station was first opened on 1 December 1841. However, the current buildings weren’t added until around 1912, the same year in which the station was renamed to 'Bushey & Oxhey'. The distinctive red brick design is similar to those along the route - larger than most - although smaller than that at Harrow & Wealdstone. London Underground's Bakerloo line trains served the station from 16 April 1917 until 27 September 1982.

During the war years of 1939–1945 the station was often known as "Ampersand" – this was due to a typically bureaucratic application of emergency regulations. To hinder enemy troops in the event of an invasion it was ordered that all station names should be painted out on station name-boards, and this was interpreted at Bushey & Oxhey to mean the words 'Bushey' and 'Oxhey' but not the '&'. For the duration of the war, therefore, the station bore the designation '&'.

The station was renamed from "Bushey & Oxhey" to "Bushey" on 6 May 1974, even though it is actually sited in the neighbouring town of Oxhey, and the nearest part of Bushey (Bushey Village) is over 1 mile (1.6 km) away.

=== Accidents and incidents ===
Accident at Bushey on 16 Feb 1980

On 16 February 1980, faulty trackwork caused nine coaches of an express London Euston to Manchester Piccadilly passenger train to derail as it passed through the station. Three coaches were overturned and 19 passengers were seriously injured. The track required extensive repairs and did not reopen fully until 25 February 1980. The little used platform 3 was extensively damaged in the accident and remained closed until 2011.

On 20 April 1980, a passenger train heading for Bletchley derailed immediately before Bushey station after hitting track maintenance machinery. The leading bogie of the Class 310 EMU derailed, but the train remained upright and damage was slight. One member of the track maintenance team sustained a broken pelvis.

On 8 August 1996, the Watford rail crash occurred around 1 mile (1.6 km) north of the station.

== Facilities ==
Bushey station and cycle store viewed from Eastbury Road entrance

The station is equipped with a ticket office, waiting rooms, ticket machines, a refreshment kiosk, help points, a car park, cycle storage and live departure screens. There is no step-free access.

Starting in December 2007, Transport for London began a significant upgrade programme at the station. During the following four years, the underpass was relined with plasterboard walls and corrugated steel ceilings and repainted. The doors and windows were repainted, and the orange railings replaced the old green and blue railings. A non-slip surface had been added to areas of the floor and all of the stairways. Extensive CCTV was installed throughout and signage was changed to London Overground standards, as at other Overground stations. The alleyway linking the entrance of the station to Kingsfield Road was upgraded, replacing the repeatedly vandalised wooden fences with metal palisade. The level access from Platform 1 to the Kingsfield Road footpath was closed permanently. The bicycle shed was moved from the front of the station on Pinner Road to the Eastbury Road entrance. The space at the front was converted to a shop and newsagents.

In May 2024, the Department for Transport announced that feasibility work would be carried out on 50 stations - including Bushey - as part of its Access for All programme to provide step-free access. A subsequent update in January 2026 stated that plans for Bushey station would not be taken forward.

== Platform layout ==
The local London Overground DC service that loops to the west to serve Watford High Street before Watford Junction makes platforms 1 & 2 curve away from the main line route. There are four main line platforms: one for the down (northbound) fast line (platform 3), two for the up (southbound) fast and the down (northbound) slow lines (platforms 4 & 5) which form an island platform; one serving the up (southbound) slow line (platform 6).

Platforms 3 and 4 are by far the least used, since these fast main line tracks are normally used by trains not stopping at Bushey. Platform 3 is accessed via the stairway for platform 2 and is fitted with a remotely operated gate to prevent access when the platform is not in operation. Platforms 3 and 4 were brought back into use for the December 2011 timetable, which marks some services as "front four coaches only for Bushey", allowing an improved late evening and weekend connection with London. Prior to this reinstatement, engineering works frequently meant that late-evening London Midland services could not stop at Bushey as a northbound platform was not available. It was overgrown after having fallen into disuse many years earlier and boarded off following its partial destruction during the crash of February 1980: the locomotive and leading two coaches passed through the station before coming to a stand having destroyed the platform face.

== Passenger volume ==
Passenger volume at Bushey
	2004–05	2005–06	2006–07	2007–08	2008–09	2009–10	2010–11	2011–12	2012–13	2013–14	2014–15	2015–16	2016–17	2017–18	2018–19	2019–20	2020–21	2021–22	2022–23	2023–24	2024–25
Entries and exits	563,255	620,562	737,058	723,486	491,710	533,866	881,958	964,610	1,059,704	1,136,518	1,240,946	1,457,950	1,472,746	1,490,134	1,520,068	1,478,460	367,978	825,582	1,000,848	1,157,470	1,225,400

The statistics cover twelve month periods that start in April.

== Services ==
The station is situated 5 miles (8 km) north of Harrow & Wealdstone along the WCML. Immediately north of the station, the WCML crosses Watford's Lower High Street over Bushey Arches Viaduct and shortly afterwards crosses the River Colne on another viaduct.

Services at Bushey are operated by London Overground on the Lioness line and London Northwestern Railway.

The typical off-peak service in trains per hour is:

- 6 tph to London Euston (4 of these call at all stations and 2 call at Harrow & Wealdstone only)
- 4 tph to Watford Junction
- 2 tph to Milton Keynes Central

During the peak hours, the station is served by an additional half-hourly service between London Euston and Tring, which usually passes through Bushey without stopping.

Preceding station	National Rail	Following station
Watford Junction towards Milton Keynes Central	London Northwestern Railway London–Milton Keynes	Harrow & Wealdstone towards London Euston
Preceding station	London Overground	Following station
Watford High Street towards Watford Junction	Lioness line Watford DC line	Carpenders Park towards Euston
Historical railways
Preceding station	London Underground	Following station
Watford High Street towards Watford Junction	Bakerloo line (1917-1982)	Carpenders Park towards Elephant & Castle
Preceding station	National Rail	Following station
Watford Junction	London and North Western Railway West Coast Main Line	Hatch End

== Connections ==
London Bus routes 142, 258, and London Service Permit route 8 also serve the station and non-London Bus Routes 306, 306B, 602 and W19 serve the station.

== Bibliography ==
- Quick, Michael (2023). Railway Passenger Stations in Great Britain: A Chronology (PDF) (5th ed.). London: Railway and Canal Historical Society.
