= Hatch End railway station =

London Overground station

Hatch End
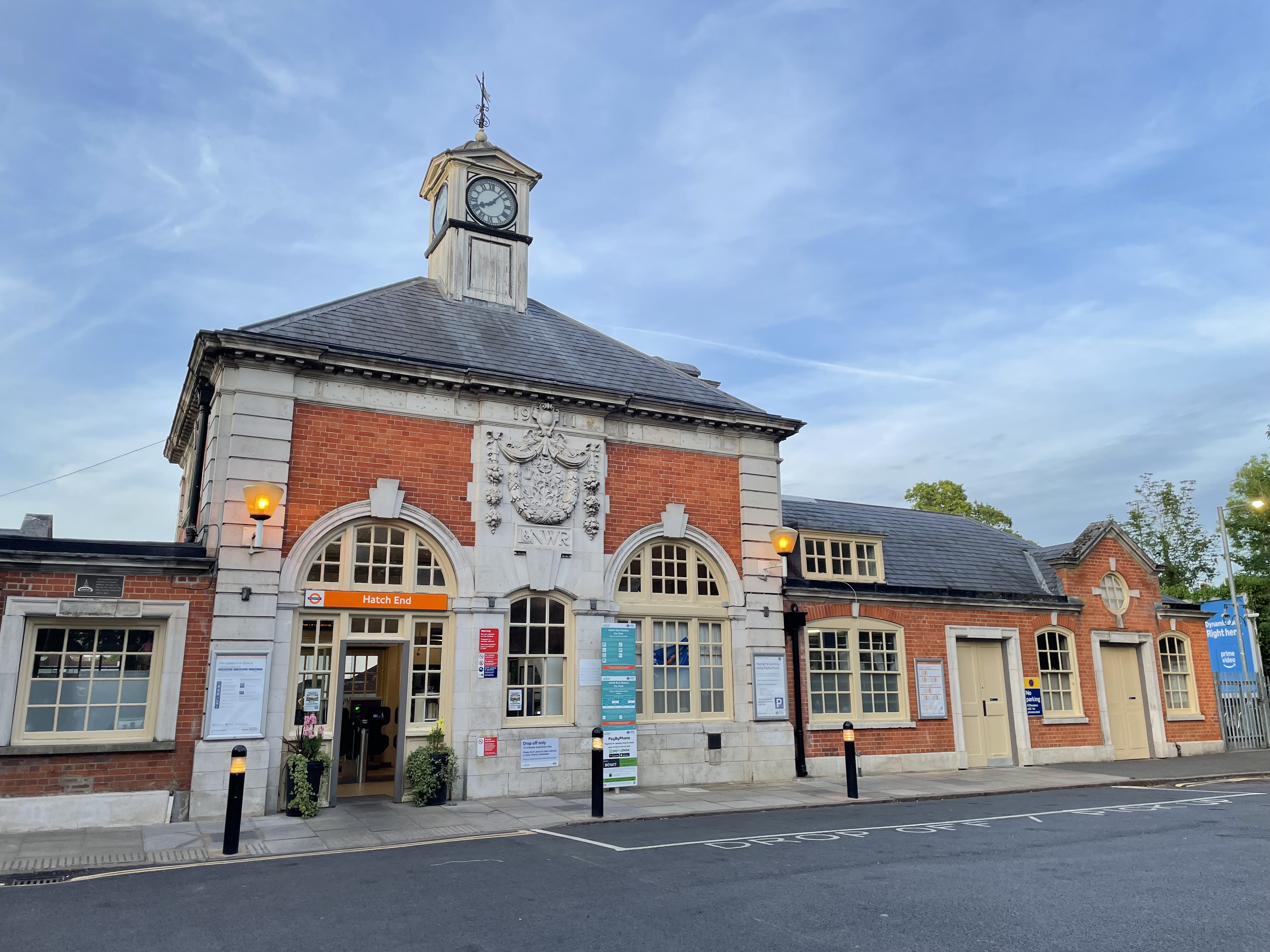
- Interactive map of Hatch End

General information
- Location: Hatch End
- Local authority: London Borough of Harrow
- Grid reference: TQ130913
- Managed by: London Overground
- Owner: Network Rail
- Station code: HTE
- DfT category: E
- Number of platforms: 2
- Tracks: 6
- Accessible: Yes (Northbound only)
- Fare zone: 6

National Rail annual entry and exit
- 2020–21: ▼0.215 million
- 2021–22: ▲0.486 million
- 2022–23: ▲0.544 million
- 2023–24: ▲0.595 million
- 2024–25: ▲0.696 million

Railway companies
- Original company: London and Birmingham Railway
- Pre-grouping: London and North Western Railway
- Post-grouping: London, Midland and Scottish Railway

Key dates
- 1842 or c. 1844: Opened as Pinner
- 1 January 1897: Renamed Pinner & Hatch End
- 16 April 1917: Bakerloo line service introduced
- 1 February 1920: Renamed Hatch End (For Pinner)
- 11 June 1956: Renamed Hatch End
- 1963: Main Lines Platforms Closed
- 24 September 1982: Bakerloo line service withdrawn

Other information
- External links: Departures; Facilities
- Coordinates: 51.6095°N 0.3681°W

Hatch End is a London Overground station on the Lioness line, situated in the London Borough of Harrow in north London. It is located in London fare zone 6. The station was formerly served by the Bakerloo line of the London Underground from 16 April 1917 until 24 September 1982.

== History ==
The original station opened as Pinner on the London and Birmingham Railway, either in 1842 or c. 1844. It was renamed Pinner and Hatch End on 1 January 1897. The present station was built in 1911 to a design by architect Gerald Horsley, son of the painter John Calcott Horsley. The station was served by the Baker Street and Waterloo Railway (Bakerloo) from 16 April 1917, when Bakerloo services were extended from Willesden Junction to Watford Junction. The station was again renamed Hatch End (for Pinner) on 1 February 1920, and finally Hatch End on 11 June 1956. Bakerloo line services were withdrawn on 24 September 1982.

It has two platforms. The northbound (down) platform is on the side of the ticket office and cafe. The southbound (up) platform is reached via a footbridge. This platform was originally an island platform with the other face on the adjacent down fast main line. There was another island platform serving the up fast and down semi-fast lines and a further platform for the up semi-fasts. These other platforms were closed in 1963. A general rebuilding of the access to the two remaining platforms in use was built in the 1980s and a fence built along to shield waiting passengers from the fast trains. Ticket barriers were installed in early 2010.

== Services ==
Hatch End station is located alongside the West Coast Main Line, but is served only by Lioness line commuter trains running on the parallel Watford DC line. Four trains per hour are operated by London Overground to London Euston (southbound) and Watford Junction (northbound). This is the standard service, seven days a week. The typical journey time to Euston is 38 minutes and to Watford Junction is 11 minutes.

Connections are available at Harrow & Wealdstone for a West Midlands Trains (London Northwestern Railway) fast service to London Euston or the Southern service to East Croydon, or the Bakerloo line calling at all stations to Elephant & Castle. Figures show that many change at Harrow & Wealdstone for the Southern train to alight at West Brompton or Kensington Olympia for the District line for central London. Also, those who have changed onto the Southern train have the option for other Southern services and South Western Railway at Clapham Junction.

In 2007, the station added to its facilities a cafe selling various beverages, snacks and newspapers; this on the northbound platform. The ticket office has improved opening hours and is more or less open when every train comes through. If not, there are several customer service assistants around if need be. There are also two ticket machines in the foyer where one can buy any national rail tickets, as well as travel cards, and oyster tickets. Under the new management of London Overground there has been significant improvement such as new signs, more CCTV and electronic departure boards in the foyer, both platforms and the southbound shelter.

In early 2010, Hatch End Station has had ticket barriers installed, in common with many other London Overground Stations. There are two barriers, and another barrier for luggage and wheelchair users. There are still two ticket machines, and the ticket office which is now open much more regularly.

Architectural critic and Poet Laureate Sir John Betjeman was an admirer of Hatch End railway station, and described it as "half-way between a bank and a medium-sized country house".

Preceding station	London Overground	Following station
Carpenders Park towards Watford Junction	Lioness line Watford DC line	Headstone Lane towards Euston
Historical railways
Preceding station	London Underground	Following station
Carpenders Park towards Watford Junction	Bakerloo line (1917–1982)	Headstone Lane towards Elephant & Castle
Preceding station	National Rail	Following station
Bushey	London and North Western Railway West Coast Main Line	Harrow & Wealdstone

== Connections ==
London Buses routes H12 & H14 serve the station.
