= Bakerloo line =

London Underground line

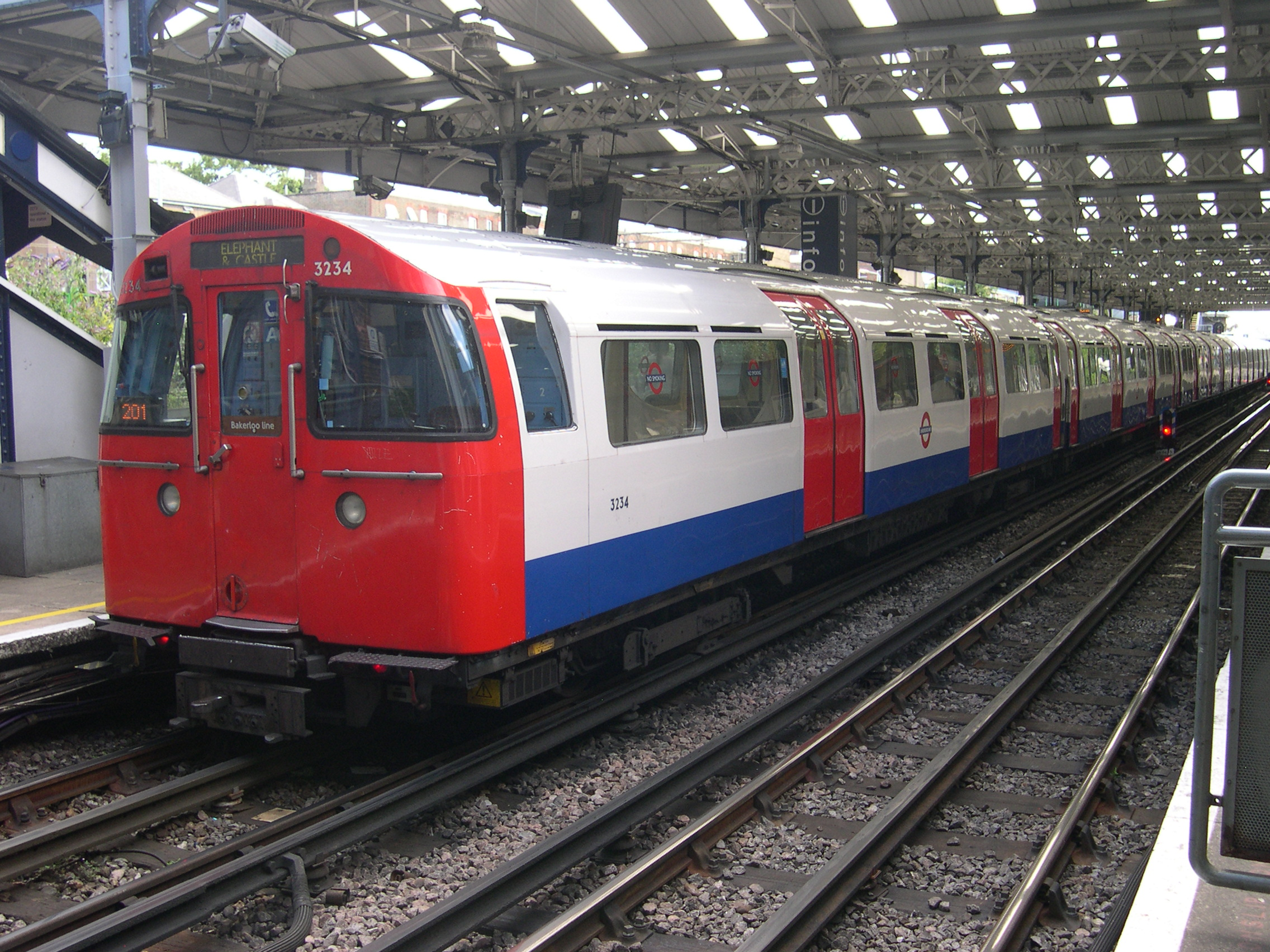
- A southbound 1972 Stock Bakerloo Line train to Elephant & Castle at Queen's Park

Overview
- Termini: Elephant & Castle; Harrow & Wealdstone
- Stations: 25
- Colour on map: Brown
- Website: tfl.gov.uk/tube/route/bakerloo/

Service
- Type: Rapid transit
- System: London Underground
- Depots: Stonebridge Park; London Road; Queen's Park
- Rolling stock: 1972 Stock
- Ridership: 125.662 million (2019) passenger journeys

History
- Opened: 10 March 1906; 120 years ago
- Last extension: 1917

Technical
- Line length: 23.2 km (14.4 mi)
- Character: Deep-level tube
- Track gauge: 1,435 mm (4 ft 8 1/2 in) standard gauge
Transport for London rail lines
London Underground
Bakerloo
Central
Circle
District
Hammersmith & City
Jubilee
Metropolitan
Northern
Piccadilly
Victoria
Waterloo & City
London Overground
Liberty
Lioness
Mildmay
Suffragette
Weaver
Windrush
Other TfL Modes
DLR
Elizabeth line
London Trams

The Bakerloo line (/ˌbeɪkərˈluː/) is a London Underground line which runs between Harrow & Wealdstone in suburban north-west London and Elephant & Castle in south London, via the West End. Printed in brown on the Tube map, it serves 25 stations, 15 of which are underground, over 23.2 kilometres (14.4 mi). It runs partly on the surface and partly through deep-level tube tunnels.

The line's name is a portmanteau of its original name, the Baker Street and Waterloo Railway; the variation caught on so quickly that the name was officially changed within four months of entering service. From Queen's Park to Harrow & Wealdstone (the section above ground), the line shares tracks with the London Overground Lioness line and runs parallel to the West Coast Main Line. There is, however, a short tunnel at the western end of Kensal Green.

Opened between 1906 and 1915, many of its stations retain elements of their design to a common standard: the stations below ground using Art Nouveau decorative tiling by Leslie Green, and the above-ground stations built in red brick with stone detailing in an Arts & Crafts style. It is the ninth-busiest line on the network, carrying more than 125 million passengers annually.

The line currently operates 1972 Stock trains, which at 54 years old, are the oldest electric multiple unit trains in regular passenger service in Britain. An extension to Lewisham has been proposed.

== History ==
The route had its origins in the failed projects of the pneumatic 1865 Waterloo and Whitehall Railway and the 1882 Charing Cross and Waterloo Electric Railway.

Originally called the Baker Street & Waterloo Railway, the line was constructed by the Underground Electric Railways Company of London (UERL) and opened between Lambeth North (at the time named Kennington Road) and Baker Street on 10 March 1906. It was extended eastward to Elephant & Castle five months later, on 5 August. In common usage, the contraction into "Bakerloo" rapidly caught on, and the official name was changed to match in July 1906.

When work on the line started in June 1898, it had been financed by the mining entrepreneur and company promoter Whitaker Wright, who fell foul of the law over the financial proceedings involved and dramatically committed suicide at the Royal Courts of Justice, after being convicted in 1904. As a result, work on the line was stopped for a few months and did not resume until Charles Yerkes and UERL stepped in and took over the project.

By 1913, the line had been extended westward from its original northern terminus at Baker Street, with interchange stations with the Great Central Railway at Marylebone and with the Great Western Railway at Paddington, and a new station at Edgware Road.

=== Watford branch ===
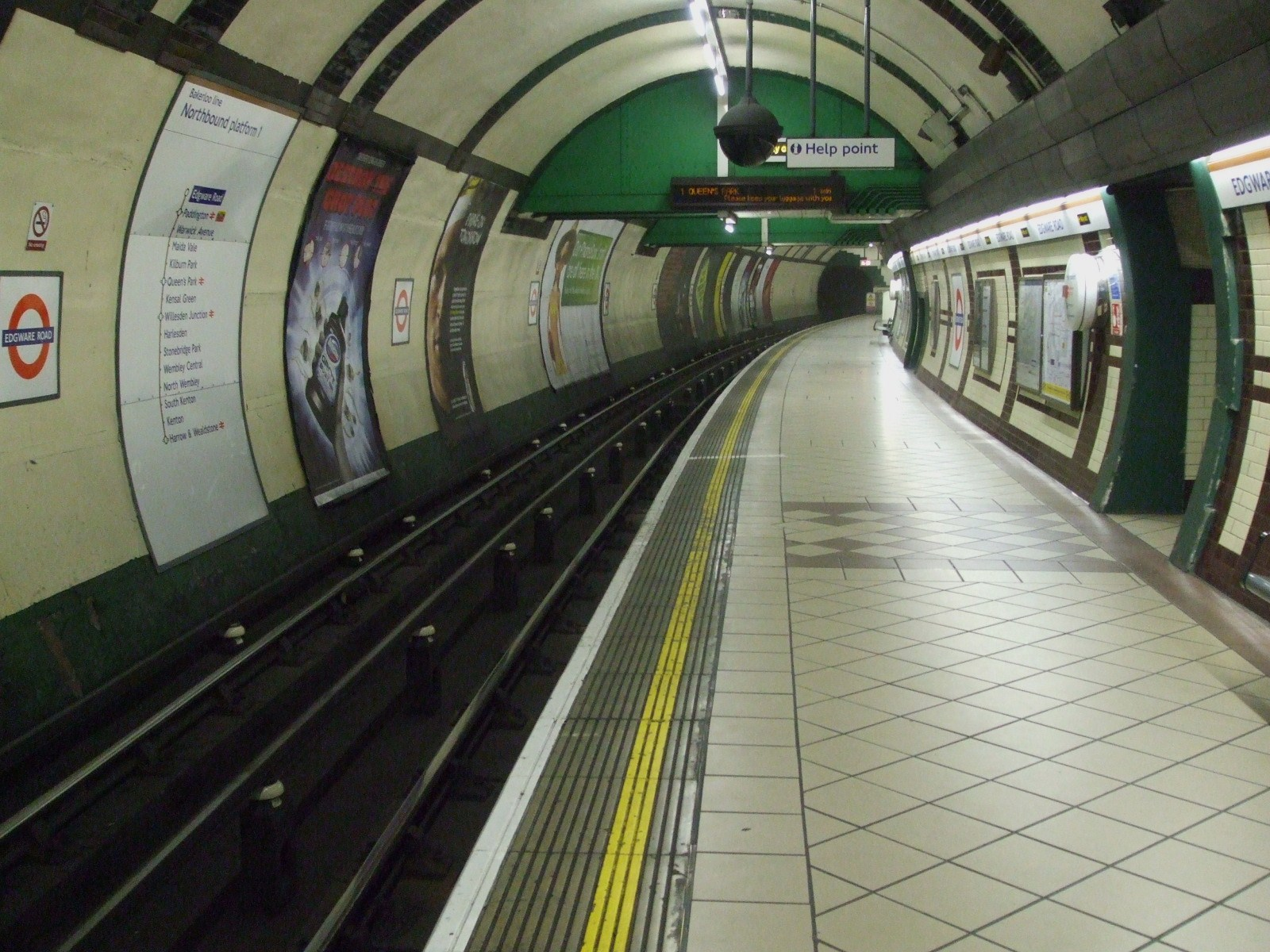
The northbound Bakerloo line platform at Edgware Road

In 1915, the line was extended to Queen's Park, where it joined the LNWR's Euston-Watford DC line (now part of London Overground) to Watford Junction . Bakerloo services to Watford Junction were reduced in the 1960s and cut back in 1982 to Stonebridge Park.

Services as far as Harrow & Wealdstone were gradually restored from 1984, and in 1989 the present all-day service was instituted.

=== Stanmore branch ===
By the mid-1930s, the Metropolitan line was suffering from congestion caused by the limited capacity of its tracks between Baker Street and Finchley Road stations. To relieve this pressure, the network-wide New Works Programme included the construction of new sections of tunnel between the Bakerloo line's platforms at Baker Street and Finchley Road and the replacement of three Metropolitan line stations (Lord's, Marlborough Road and Swiss Cottage) between those points with two new Bakerloo line stations (St John's Wood and Swiss Cottage). The Bakerloo line took over the Metropolitan line's service to Stanmore on 20 November 1939. The branch remained part of the Bakerloo line until 1 May 1979, when similar congestion problems for the Bakerloo line caused by two branches converging at Baker Street led to the creation of the Jubilee line, initially formed by connecting the Stanmore branch to new tunnels bored between Baker Street and Charing Cross.

When the Bakerloo line was extended to Watford in 1917, it acquired an interchange at Harrow & Wealdstone with another route to Stanmore, the Stanmore branch line. This branch line was operated by the LNWR and terminated at a separate Stanmore station (later renamed Stanmore Village). It was closed in 1964, partly due to the success of the rival Metropolitan/Bakerloo Underground line to Stanmore.

=== Camberwell extension ===
An extension at the southern end of the line to Camberwell and Denmark Hill was proposed and approved in 1931 as part of the London Electric Metropolitan District and Central London Railway Companies (Works) Act, 1931. In April 1937, the estimated cost of the proposed extension was £5,000,000 (approximately £371 million today) and the London Passenger Transport Board announced that, due to rising materials prices, the extension had been postponed until the Board's finances improved. Apart from the extension of the sidings south of Elephant & Castle, no work on the extension took place before the Second World War, but the powers were renewed by the government in 1947 under the Special Enactments (Extension of Time) Act, 1940. A projected extension as far as Camberwell was shown on a 1949 edition of the Underground map but the scheme was suspended in 1950 as costs had increased to £6.25 million. The train describers at Warwick Avenue station showed Camberwell as a destination until the 1990s. Further extensions of the line were considered, south to Peckham Rye in the 1970s, and east to London Docklands and Canary Wharf in the 1980s. Neither proposal was proceeded with.

=== Electricity supply ===
One oddity is that, almost from its opening until 1917, the Bakerloo operated with the polarity of the conductor rails reversed, the outside rail negative and the centre rail positive. This came about because the Bakerloo shared a power source with the District Railway. On the Bakerloo, the outside conductor rail tended to leak to the tunnel wall, whereas on the District Railway, the centre rail shared a similar problem. The solution was to reverse the polarity on the Bakerloo line, so that the negative rail leaked on both systems. In 1917, the two lines were separated when the LNWR began its 'New Line' service between Euston and Watford Junction, which the Bakerloo would share north of Queens Park. As a result, normal operation was restored.

=== Centenary ===
The line celebrated its centenary on 10 March 2006, when events were organised with actors and staff in Edwardian costume entertaining travellers.

=== 2017 fire ===
In 2017, a fire on a train at Oxford Circus station caused disruption on the Bakerloo line. A number of people were treated for the effects of smoke inhalation.

== Future developments ==
=== Re-extension to Watford Junction ===
Operation of the northern section of the line may be changed following the decision in February 2006 to transfer responsibility for Euston-Watford suburban services (on the Watford DC Line) from the Department for Transport to Transport for London (TfL). This was in conjunction with the reorganisation of a number of north London railways under London Overground.

In a former London Plan, it was projected that by 2026 the Bakerloo line would be re-extended from Harrow & Wealdstone to Watford Junction, restoring the pre-1982 service. The railway line from Queens Park to Watford Junction, currently shared with London Overground, would be shared with the Bakerloo line. In 2011, the Best And Final Bid documentation for the Croxley Rail Link project indicated that this Bakerloo line extension was "unlikely" because "TfL's plans to extend the Bakerloo line to Watford Junction are on hold indefinitely due to funding and business case constraints". As of late 2024, Transport for London confirmed in its answer to a FOI request the absence of plans for a re-extension of the line to Watford Junction, citing priority being assigned, among other projects, to the extension of the line to Lewisham and Hayes.

=== Extension to Lewisham and Hayes ===
Proposed Bakerloo line extension to Lewisham, safeguarded by TfL in 2021

Since the late 2000s, Transport for London (TfL) has been planning an extension of the line, with a route to Lewisham via Old Kent Road safeguarded in 2021. Four stations would be built, at Burgess Park, Old Kent Road, New Cross Gate and Lewisham, with provision for a further extension along the Mid-Kent line to Hayes and Beckenham Junction. This could occur following the completion of the extension to Lewisham. Estimated to cost between £4.7bn to £7.9bn (in 2017 prices), the extension would take around 7 years to construct. Due to TfL's poor finances following the COVID-19 pandemic, work to implement the extension is currently on hold.

As of 27 September 2025, the London Buses route BL1, also called the Bakerloop, runs a route from Waterloo station to Lewisham, similar to the projected route of the Lewisham extension of the Bakerloo line.

== Rolling stock ==
=== Current rolling stock ===
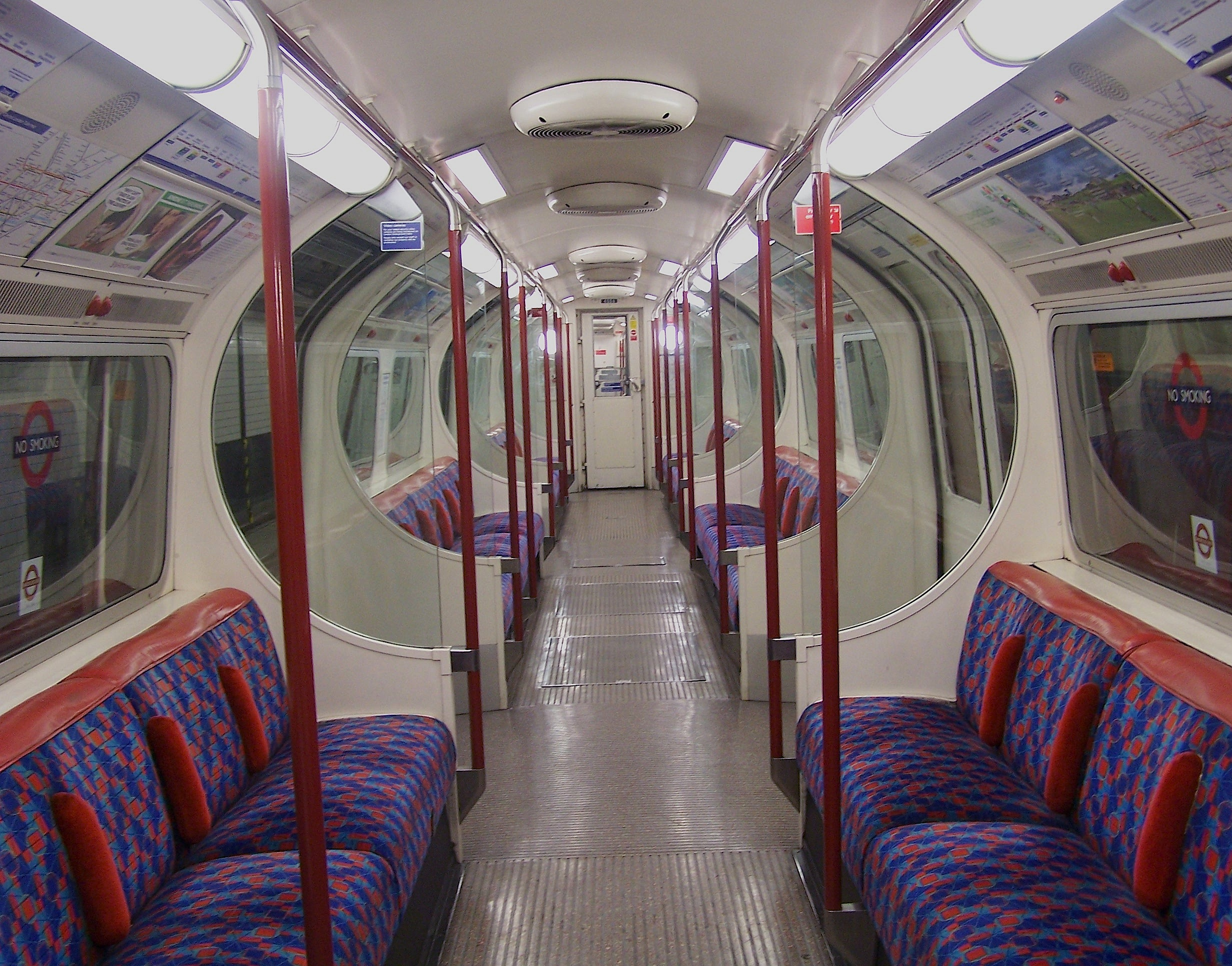
The interior of a Bakerloo line train

The Bakerloo line is operated entirely by 1972 Stock, displaced from the Jubilee line by 1983 stock. The trains are maintained at Stonebridge Park depot. All Bakerloo line trains are painted in the London Underground livery of red, white and blue, and are the smaller of the two train sizes used on the network, as the line runs deep underground in small-diameter tunnels.

In the early 2000s, the interiors of the trains were 'deep-cleaned' and the upholstery replaced with a blue moquette. The seating layouts are both longitudinal and transverse; some cars have longitudinal seating only. A TfL Finance and Policy Committee Paper dated 11 March 2015 revealed that the repair programme for the 1972 Stock would be more expensive than anticipated, due to the unexpectedly inferior condition of the fleet.

In early 2016, a four-year refurbishment programme began with the first of the new-look cars operating on the line in March. Each car's interior was cleaned, the seating moquette replaced with a variation of the Barman type seen on other lines, and handrails and lighting renewed. Each car was assessed and repair work carried out to ensure the stock can operate safely.

According to a November 2021 paper by the TfL Finance Committee, replacement of the current trains may not occur until the late 2030s or early 2040s, due to a lack of funding. In this case, the trains would be 60-70 years old at the time of replacement, around twice their design life. Since the withdrawal of the final Class 483 trains on the Isle of Wight, the 1972 Stock have become the oldest non-heritage trains running in the United Kingdom.

=== Future rolling stock ===
In the late 1990s, the Labour government initiated a public–private partnership (PPP) to reverse years of underinvestment in London Underground. Under the PPP contract, Metronet – the private consortium responsible for the Bakerloo line – would order new rolling stock for the line. This would take place following the delivery of 2009 Stock and S Stock trains, with an order for 24 new Bakerloo line trains. These would have entered service by 2019. However, Metronet collapsed in 2007 after cost overruns, and the PPP ended in 2010.

In the mid 2010s, TfL began a process of ordering new rolling stock to replace trains on the Piccadilly, Central, Bakerloo and Waterloo & City lines. A feasibility study into the new trains showed that new generation trains and re-signalling could increase capacity on the Bakerloo line by 25%, with 27 trains per hour.

In June 2018, the Siemens Mobility Inspiro design was selected. These trains would have an open gangway design, wider doorways, air conditioning and the ability to run automatically with a new signalling system. TfL could only afford to order Piccadilly line trains at a cost of £1.5bn. However, the contract with Siemens includes an option for 40 trains for the Bakerloo line in the future. This would take place after the delivery of the Piccadilly line trains in the late 2020s. In February 2026, TfL announced plans to replace the entire fleet by 2030.

=== Former rolling stock ===
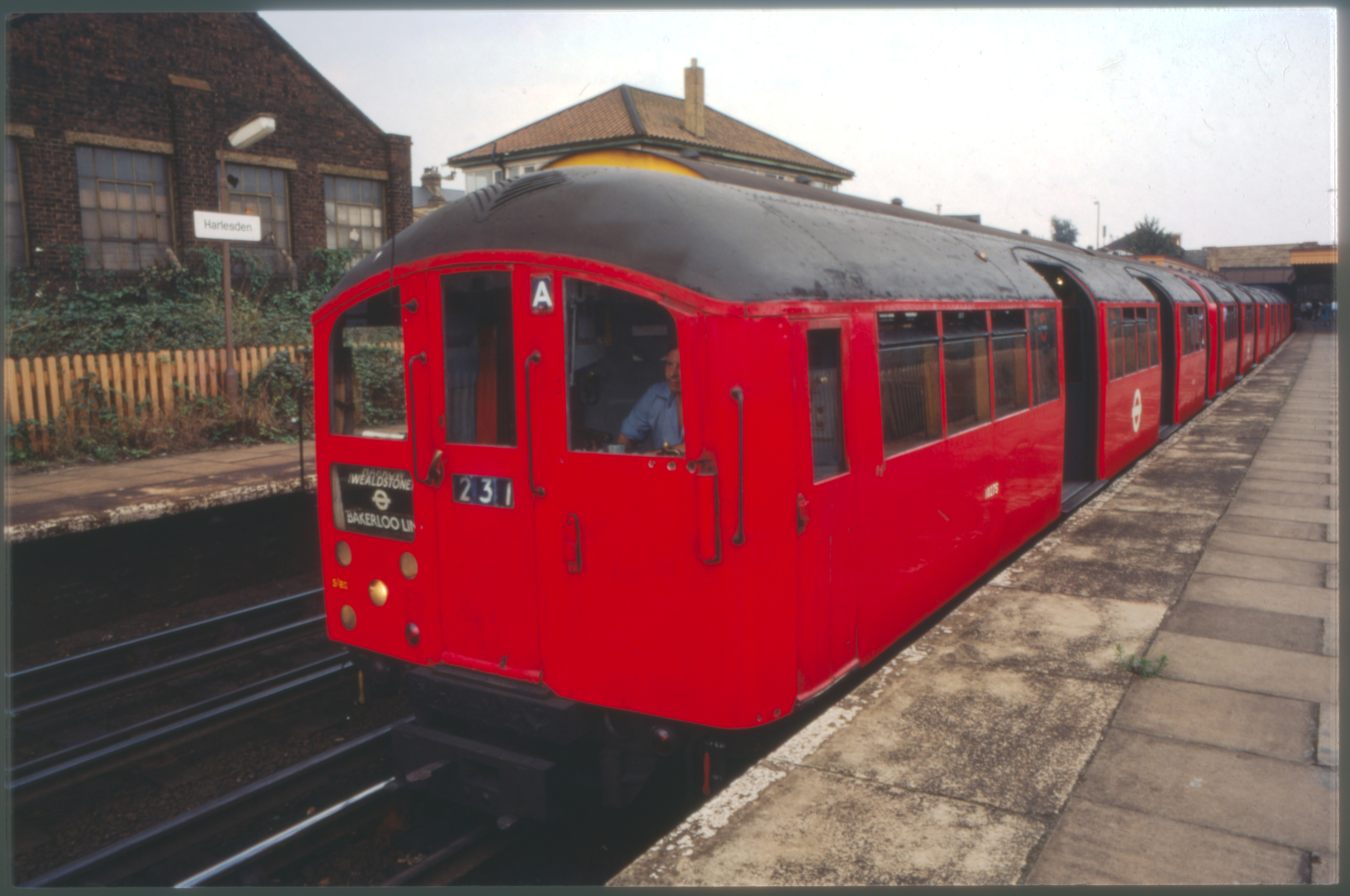
A northbound 1938 stock train at Harlesden station

When opened in 1906, the Bakerloo line was operated by Gate Stock trains, built at Trafford Park, Manchester. To cope with the extension to Queen's Park, 12 extra motor cars of the London Underground 1914 Stock were ordered, ten from Brush of Loughborough and two from the Leeds Forge Company.

To operate services north of Queen's Park, 72 additional cars were built by the Metropolitan Carriage, Waggon and Finance Company of Birmingham. These trains, known as the Watford Joint Stock, were partly owned by the Underground and partly by the London and North Western Railway (later London, Midland and Scottish Railway (LMS)). They were initially painted in LNWR livery. They were not equipped with air-operated doors and proved slow and unreliable, so they were replaced by new trains of Standard Stock by 1930 (although a few were retained by the LMS). For some years in the 1930s, Watford trains had a distinctive blue stripe at window level.

In 1932, some carriages built for the Piccadilly line by Cammell Laird in Nottingham in 1919 were transferred to the Bakerloo line. When built, these had been the first Tube trains to have air-operated doors. These were later replaced by more trains of Standard Stock, in turn being replaced by 1938 stock and 1949 stock.

Until the 1980s, the Bakerloo line was mainly worked by 1938 stock. 1972 stock operated briefly on the line during the late 1970s until it was transferred to the Jubilee line when it opened in 1979. From 1983, the 1938 stock began to be replaced by trains of 1959 stock from the Northern line, but this was a temporary measure until 1972 stock became available. The last 1938 stock train was withdrawn on 20 November 1985. From 1986, the 1959 stock was transferred back to the Northern line and was replaced by the current 1972 stock.

== Route ==
=== Map ===
The route of the Bakerloo line

== Services ==
As of May 2021, weekday off-peak and Sunday services on Bakerloo line in trains per hour (tph) are:

- 4 tph between Harrow & Wealdstone and Elephant & Castle
- 4 tph between Stonebridge Park and Elephant & Castle
- 8 tph between Queen's Park and Elephant & Castle

This forms a 16 trains per hour service (or a train approximately every 4 minutes) between Queen's Park and Elephant & Castle. A 20 trains per hour service runs on this section of the line during the weekday peak and all day on Saturdays.

== Stations ==
Note: For the former Stanmore branch of the Bakerloo line, see the Jubilee line article. For the stations past Harrow & Wealdstone no longer served by the Bakerloo Line but still served by Overground trains, see the Lioness line article.

Station	Image	Opened	Additional Information
Harrow & Wealdstone		16 April 1917	Connects with Lioness line and National Rail services. Service withdrawn 24 September 1982. Service restored 4 June 1984.^{map 1}
Kenton		16 April 1917	Service withdrawn 24 September 1982. Service restored 4 June 1984.^{map 2}
South Kenton		3 July 1933	Service withdrawn 24 September 1982. Service restored 4 June 1984.^{map 3}
North Wembley		16 April 1917	Service withdrawn 24 September 1982. Service restored 4 June 1984.^{map 4}
Wembley Central		16 April 1917	Connects with National Rail services. Opened as Wembley Central for Sudbury; renamed 5 July 1948. Service withdrawn 24 September 1982. Service restored 4 June 1984.^{map 5}
Stonebridge Park		1 August 1917	^{map 6}
Harlesden		16 April 1917	^{map 7}
Willesden Junction		10 May 1915	Connects with Mildmay line.^{map 8}
Kensal Green		1 October 1916	^{map 9}
Queen's Park		11 February 1915	Connects with Lioness line.^{map 10}
Kilburn Park		31 January 1915	^{map 11}
Maida Vale		6 June 1915	^{map 12}
Warwick Avenue		31 January 1915	^{map 13}
Paddington ( Trains to Heathrow)		1 December 1913	Connects with Circle, District and Hammersmith & City lines, Elizabeth line and National Rail services.^{map 14}
Edgware Road		15 June 1907	^{map 15}
Marylebone		27 March 1907	Connects with National Rail services. Opened as Great Central; renamed 15 April 1917.^{map 16}
Baker Street		10 March 1906	Connects with Circle, Hammersmith & City, Jubilee and Metropolitan lines.^{map 17}
Regent's Park		10 March 1906	^{map 18}
Oxford Circus		10 March 1906	Connects with Central and Victoria lines.^{map 19}
Piccadilly Circus		10 March 1906	Connects with Piccadilly line.^{map 20}
Charing Cross		10 March 1906	^{map 21}Connects with Northern line and National Rail services. Opened as Trafalgar Square; renamed 1 May 1979.
Embankment		10 March 1906	^{map 22} Connects with Circle, District and Northern lines. Opened as Charing Cross; renamed 12 September 1976.
Waterloo		10 March 1906	Connects with Jubilee, Northern and Waterloo & City lines, and National Rail services.^{map 23}
Lambeth North		10 March 1906	Opened as Kennington Road; renamed Westminster Bridge Road 5 August 1906, renamed Lambeth North 15 April 1917.^{map 24}
Elephant & Castle		5 August 1906	Connects with Northern line and National Rail services.^{map 25}

=== Former stations ===
==== Watford branch ====
Between 1917 and 1982, Bakerloo line trains continued along the DC line past Harrow & Wealdstone to Watford Junction. These stations continue to be served by Lioness line. Proposals have surfaced to re-extend the Bakerloo line to Watford Junction and service the following stations:

Station	Opened	Service withdrawn	Additional information
Watford Junction	16 April 1917	16 September 1982	
Watford High Street	16 April 1917	24 September 1982	
Bushey	16 April 1917	24 September 1982	Known as Bushey & Oxhey before 6 May 1974.
Carpenders Park	5 April 1919	24 September 1982	Closed 16 November 1952; re-opened on new site 17 November 1952.
Hatch End	16 April 1917	24 September 1982	Opened as Hatch End & Pinner; renamed Hatch End (for Pinner) 1 February 1920, renamed Hatch End 1956.
Headstone Lane	16 April 1917	24 September 1982	

==== Stanmore branch ====
The Stanmore branch was originally constructed by the Metropolitan Railway and was later designated as the Stanmore branch of the Bakerloo line in 1939. It was transferred to the Jubilee line on 1 May 1979. It connected to the main Bakerloo line at Baker Street.

- Stanmore
- Canons Park
- Queensbury
- Kingsbury
- Wembley Park
- Neasden
- Dollis Hill
- Willesden Green
- Kilburn
- West Hampstead
- Finchley Road
- Swiss Cottage
- St John's Wood
- Baker Street

== Depots ==
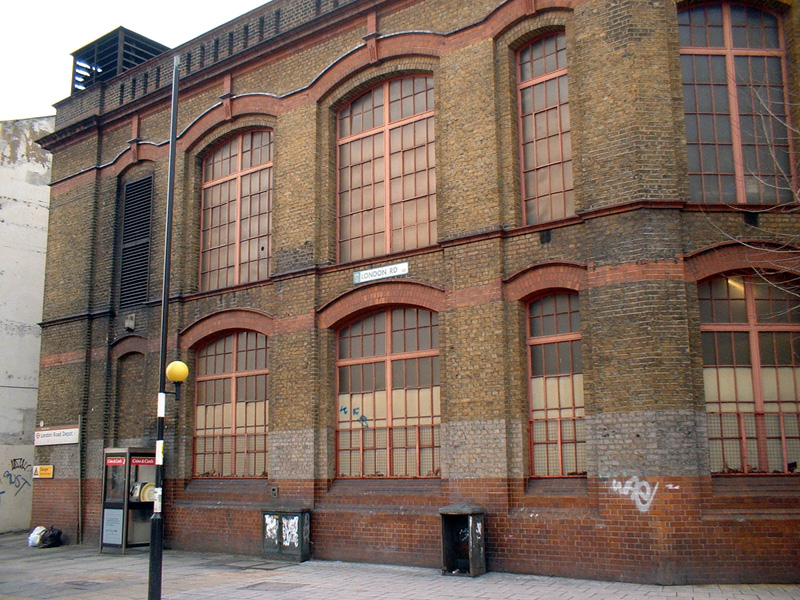
Bakerloo line depot at London Road

The Bakerloo line is currently served by three depots: a main depot at Stonebridge Park,^{map 26} opened on 9 April 1979 on the site of a former British Rail power station which contains the fleet's maintenance facilities; the original depot at London Road^{map 27} (between Elephant and Castle and Lambeth North, though connected to the line between Lambeth North and Waterloo); and a small depot at Queens Park station.

The Queen's Park depot has six tracks, all under cover and numbered 21–26, split between two buildings located at each end of the station, known as the North Shed and the South Shed. The South Shed has two terminal tracks (nos. 25 and 26) and is above the service tracks into the main Bakerloo line tunnels^{map 28} built in 1915. The North Shed has two terminal tracks (nos. 22 and 23) and two through tracks (nos. 21 and 24), and is unique on the London Underground network in that trains in passenger service run through it. Tracks 22 and 23 are used by trains from the south terminating at Queen's Park during service. All four tracks in the north shed are also used for stabling trains overnight.

When Bakerloo line services ran to Watford, there was also an additional depot, Croxley Green Light Maintenance Depot at Croxley Green; this depot closed in November 1985 following the withdrawal of services.

When the Bakerloo had two branches at its northern end, to Queens Park (as currently) and to Stanmore (now taken over by the Jubilee line), the depot at Neasden on the Stanmore branch was the principal one on the line. The Jubilee taking over this branch from 1979 was the reason behind building the new Stonebridge Park depot.

The London Road depot is unusual in that, although the depot is on the surface, the line passes nearby in tunnel, connected by a short and sharply graded branch tunnel.

== See also ==
- Leslie Green, architect of the Baker Street & Waterloo Railway's early stations
- Stanley Heaps, architect of the extension stations from Warwick Avenue to Kilburn Park
- List of crossings of the River Thames
- Tunnels underneath the River Thames

== Maps ==
- ^map 1Harrow & Wealdstone – 51°35′33″N 000°20′08″W
- ^map 2Kenton – 51°34′56″N 000°19′02″W
- ^map 3South Kenton – 51°34′15″N 000°18′31″W
- ^map 4North Wembley – 51°33′46″N 000°18′14″W
- ^map 5Wembley Central – 51°33′09″N 000°17′48″W
- ^map 6Stonebridge Park – 51°32′39″N 000°16′31″W
- ^map 7Harlesden – 51°32′11″N 000°15′28″W
- ^map 8Willesden Junction – 51°31′58″N 000°14′44″W
- ^map 9Kensal Green – 51°31′51″N 000°13′29″W
- ^map 10Queen's Park – 51°32′02″N 000°12′23″W
- ^map 11Kilburn Park – 51°32′06″N 000°11′39″W
- ^map 12Maida Vale – 51°31′47″N 000°11′08″W
- ^map 13Warwick Avenue – 51°31′24″N 000°11′01″W
- ^map 14Paddington (Bakerloo line) – 51°30′56″N 000°10′31″W
- ^map 15Edgware Road (Bakerloo line) – 51°31′13″N 000°10′13″W
- ^map 16Marylebone – 51°31′20″N 000°09′48″W
- ^map 17Baker Street – 51°31′19″N 000°09′25″W
- ^map 18Regent's Park – 51°31′25″N 000°08′47″W
- ^map 19Oxford Circus – 51°30′55″N 000°08′30″W
- ^map 20Piccadilly Circus – 51°30′36″N 000°08′02″W
- ^map 21Charing Cross – 51°30′29″N 000°07′29″W
- ^map 22Embankment – 51°30′25″N 000°07′19″W
- ^map 23Waterloo – 51°30′09″N 000°06′47″W
- ^map 24Lambeth North – 51°29′56″N 000°06′42″W
- ^map 25Elephant & Castle – 51°29′40″N 000°05′59″W
- ^map 26Stonebridge Park Depot – 51°32′52″N 000°17′13″W
- ^map 27London Road Depot – 51°29′54″N 000°06′17″W
- ^map 28Queens Park Depot – 51°32′04.5″N 000°12′09″W
