= Carpenders Park railway station =

London Overground station

Carpenders Park
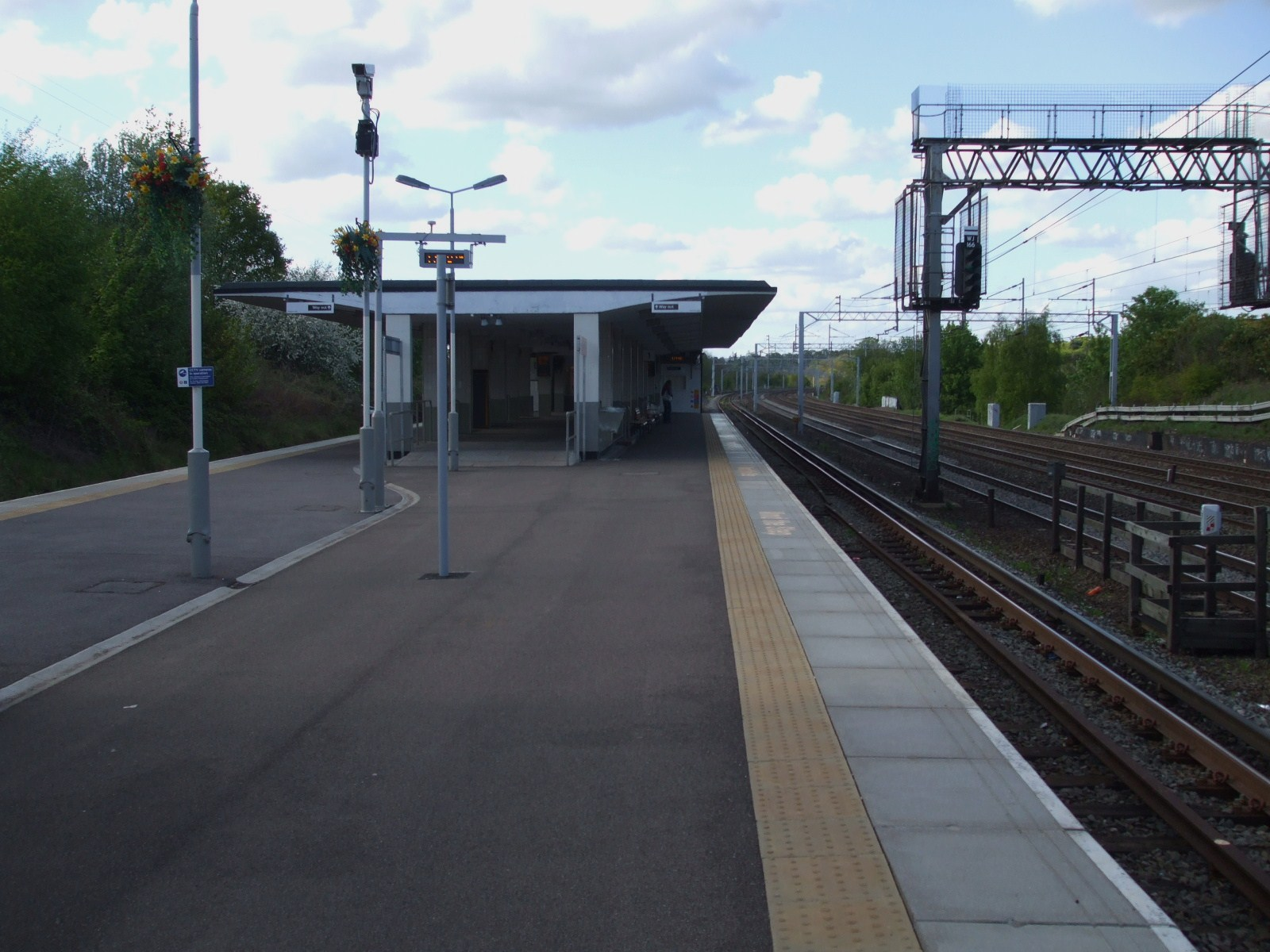
- Island platforms
- Interactive map of Carpenders Park

General information
- Location: Carpenders Park/South Oxhey
- Local authority: District of Three Rivers
- Managed by: London Overground
- Owner: Network Rail
- Station code: CPK
- DfT category: E
- Number of platforms: 2
- Tracks: 6
- Accessible: Yes
- Fare zone: 7

National Rail annual entry and exit
- 2020–21: ▼0.466 million
- 2021–22: ▲0.863 million
- 2022–23: ▲0.975 million
- 2023–24: ▲1.074 million
- 2024–25: ▲1.225 million

Other information
- External links: Departures; Facilities
- Coordinates: 51.629°N 0.386°W

Carpenders Park is a London Overground station on the Lioness line, located between the Hertfordshire suburb of Carpenders Park and the South Oxhey housing estate, 3 km (1.9 mi) south of Watford Junction. The station is an island platform reached by a subway. This has exits to both the Carpenders Park (east) and South Oxhey (west) estates. It is in London fare zone 7.

== History ==
The first station was opened by the London & North Western Railway on 1 April 1914 only to close on 1 January 1917. It reopened 5 May 1919 served only by London Electric Railway (later became London Underground) trains. L&NWR electric trains were reinstated from 10 July 1922. London Underground trains served the station until 24 September 1982. The original station was built to serve the nearby golf course. It was 230 yards (210 m) further north than the current site and was a wooden two platform structure with a footbridge. It was closed on 17 November 1952 when the present station opened.

Ticket barriers were installed in early 2010.

== Services ==
The general frequency is one train every fifteen minutes in each direction. The average journey time to Watford Junction is eight minutes and to London Euston is 44 minutes.

| Preceding station | London Overground | Following station |
|---|---|---|
| Bushey towards Watford Junction | Lioness line Watford DC line | Hatch End towards Euston |
Historical railways
| Preceding station | London Underground | Following station |
| Bushey towards Watford Junction | Bakerloo line (1917–1982) | Hatch End towards Elephant & Castle |
