= Maida Vale tube station =

London Underground station

Maida Vale
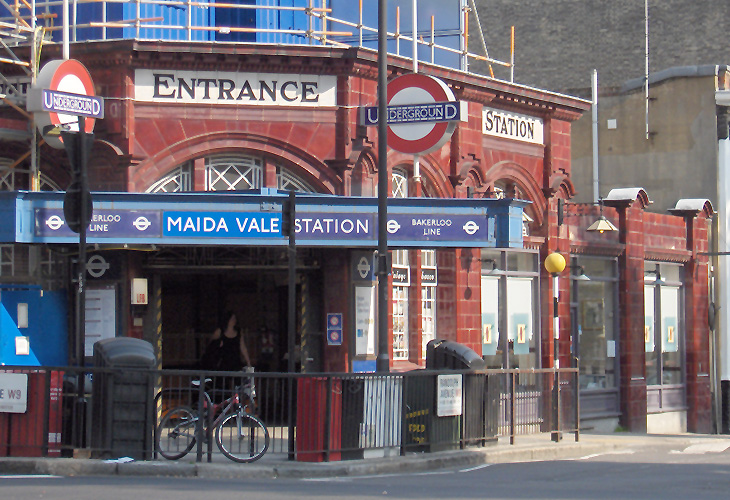
- Station entrance
- Interactive map of Maida Vale

General information
- Location: Maida Vale
- Local authority: City of Westminster
- Managed by: London Underground
- Number of platforms: 2
- Fare zone: 2

London Underground annual entry and exit
- 2020: ▼1.54 million
- 2021: ▼1.43 million
- 2022: ▲2.50 million
- 2023: ▲2.68 million
- 2024: ▲2.87 million

Railway companies
- Original company: London Electric Railway

Key dates
- 6 June 1915: Opened

Listed status
- Listing grade: II
- Entry number: 1066834
- Added to list: 26 March 1987

Other information
- External links: TfL station info page
- Coordinates: 51.5298°N 0.1856°W

Maida Vale (/ˈmeɪdə ˈveɪl/) is a London Underground station in Maida Vale, in the City of Westminster, London. It is on the Bakerloo line, between Kilburn Park and Warwick Avenue stations. It is in London fare zone 2.

The station is a Grade II listed building being of architectural and historic interest. In 2009 the station won a National Railway Heritage Award, in the London Regional category, for the successful modernisation of a historic station.

== History ==
A proposed 1908 extension of the Bakerloo Line had envisaged a stop at nearby Abercorn Place but this route was rejected. Maida Vale opened on 6 June 1915 on Bakerloo tube's extension from Paddington to Queen's Park five months after the extension. At the time, it was the first station to be entirely staffed by women. The women continued to work at the Maida Vale station until 1919 when servicemen returning from the war displaced them. The outbreak of World War II again opened up jobs for women. On 6 June 2015, the station celebrated its 100th anniversary as part of the 100 years of women in transport campaign.

== Location and layout ==
The station is located at the junction of Randolph Avenue and Elgin Avenue and has a surface building designed by Underground Electric Railways Company of London's architect Stanley Heaps. He used a standardized design that appears in many station buildings under control of UERL whilst Maida Vale was provided with buildings in the style of the earlier Leslie Green stations but without the upper storey, which was no longer required for housing lift gear. It was one of the first London Underground stations built specifically to use escalators rather than lifts.

== Transport links ==
Bus routes 16 and 98, and Night Bus routes N32 and N98 serve Maida Vale road, a short distance to the north-east.

Preceding station	London Underground	Following station
Kilburn Park towards Harrow & Wealdstone	Bakerloo line	Warwick Avenue towards Elephant & Castle
