= Kilburn Park tube station =

London Underground station

Kilburn Park
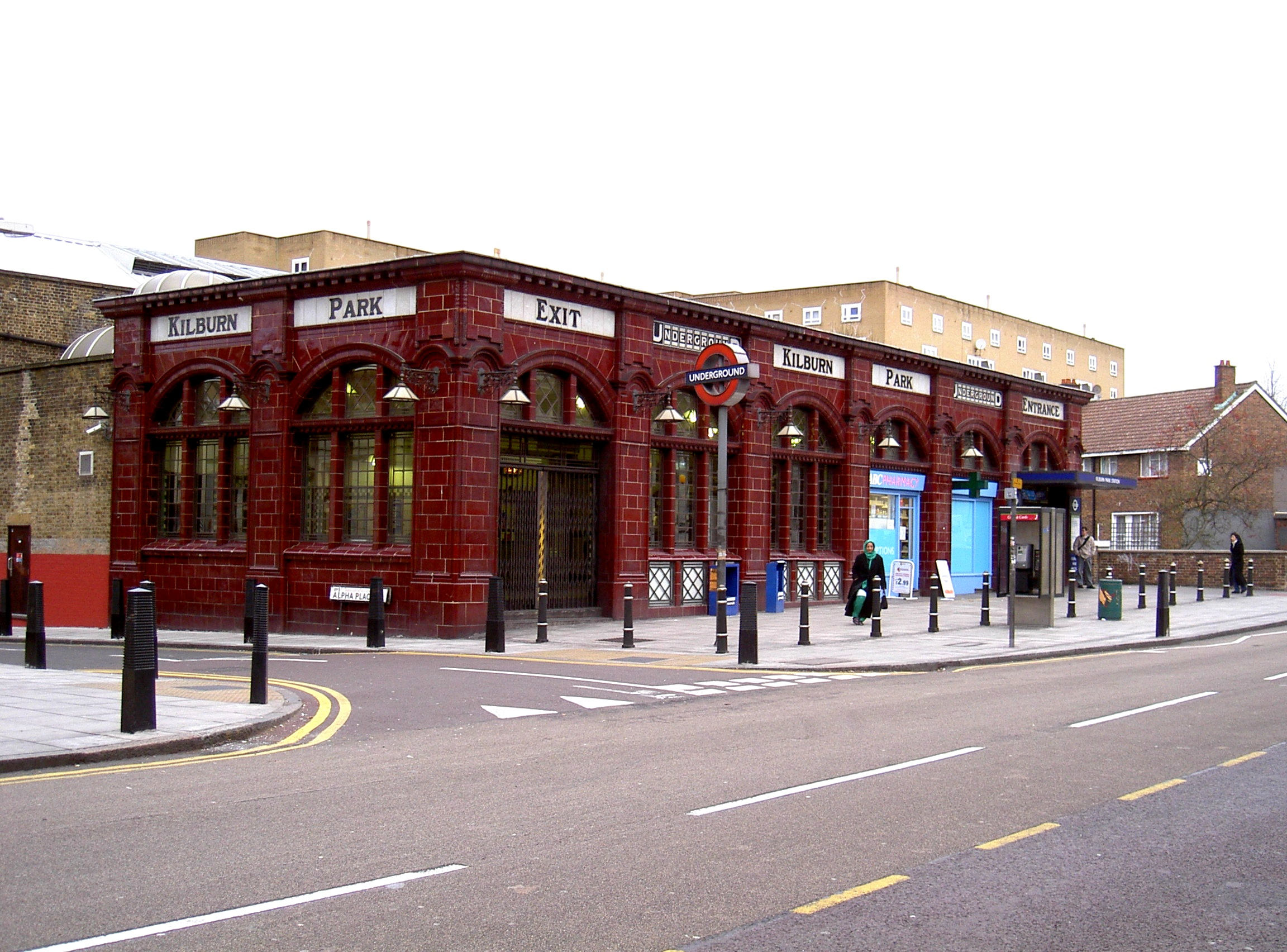
- Kilburn Park station
- Interactive map of Kilburn Park

General information
- Location: Kilburn
- Local authority: London Borough of Brent
- Managed by: London Underground
- Number of platforms: 2
- Fare zone: 2

London Underground annual entry and exit
- 2020: ▼1.48 million
- 2021: ▼1.38 million
- 2022: ▲2.43 million
- 2023: ▲2.62 million
- 2024: ▲2.74 million

Key dates
- 31 January 1915: Opened

Listed status
- Listing grade: II
- Entry number: 1078871
- Added to list: 15 March 1979; 47 years ago

Other information
- External links: TfL station info page
- Coordinates: 51.53512°N 0.19406°W

Kilburn Park is a London Underground station, located at Kilburn in the London Borough of Brent. It is on the Bakerloo line, between Queen's Park and Maida Vale stations. It is in London fare zone 2.

The station is situated on Cambridge Avenue approximately 100 metres (300 ft) west of Kilburn High Road, shortly before it becomes Maida Vale, (A5). It is Grade II listed.

== History ==
Kilburn Park was opened on 31 January 1915 as the temporary terminus of the Bakerloo line's extension from Paddington station towards Queen's Park. Services were extended to Queen's Park on 11 February 1915. At the extension's opening, Maida Vale station was not complete and the previous station was Warwick Avenue until 6 June 1915. The station building was designed by Stanley Heaps in a modified version of the earlier Leslie Green designed Bakerloo line stations with glazed terra cotta façades but without the large semi-circular windows at first floor level. It was one of the first London Underground stations built specifically to use escalators rather than lifts. (Note: The first escalator on the Underground was installed at Earl's Court in 1911. The first station built specifically for escalators was the new Central line station at Liverpool Street in 1912. All deep-tube stations built after 1913 were built with escalators.)

== Transport links ==
Bus routes 31, 32, 206, 316, 328, school route 632 and night routes N28 and N31 serve the station. Also, it is only a short walk from Kilburn High Road Station (London Overground) on the Lioness line.

== Notes ==
Preceding station	London Underground	Following station
Queen's Park towards Harrow & Wealdstone	Bakerloo line	Maida Vale towards Elephant & Castle
