= London Underground 1914 Stock =

- Stock type: Deep-level tube
- Manufacturers: Brush; Leeds Forge Company
- Line served: Bakerloo line

The 1914 Tube Stock was 12 motor coaches that were built for the Baker Street and Waterloo Railway (BS&WR, today's Bakerloo line).

== History ==
New trains were required for extensions of the BS&WR that were under construction.

Twelve motor cars were built, two by the Leeds Forge Company (numbered 38 and 39), and ten by Brush in Loughborough (numbers 40–49).These motor cars were the first built new with doors located in the centre of the body. These were hand operated with an electric lock to keep them closed. Trailer cars were transferred from the Piccadilly line where they had been surplus.

They were phased out circa 1935.
