= London Underground Watford Joint Stock =

- Stock type: Deep-level tube
- Manufacturer: Metropolitan Carriage and Wagon
- Lines served: Bakerloo line

The Watford Joint Tube Stock was built for the service to Watford along both the Bakerloo tube and the London North Western Railway (LNWR). As a result, the cars were owned by both the Underground and the LNWR. To be able to operate on both lines, the car floors were 4 1/2 inches (110 mm) higher than other tube cars. This was a compromise height between the platform heights on the two lines.

The cars were ordered in 1914, but construction was delayed by World War I. As a result, the first cars were not delivered until early 1920.

A total of 72 cars were built by Metropolitan Carriage and Wagon: 36 motor cars, 24 trailers, and 12 driving trailers. They were formed into six-car trains, and for the first time a motor car was used in the middle of the train. For this to happen, there had to be a passageway by the switch compartment as required by the Board of Trade.

These cars were built with hinged doors to the passenger compartments, an arrangement that caused delays during station stops, as each door had to be manually checked before the train departed.
