= 100 Years of Women in Transport =

Campaign

The 100 years of women in transport campaign (YOWIT) is a celebration of the significant role that women have played in the transport industry over the past 100 years in the United Kingdom, following the centennial anniversary of the First World War, when 100,000 women entered the transport industry to take on the responsibilities held by men who enlisted for military service.

The programme is a partnership between Transport for London, the Department for Transport (DfT), Crossrail, Network Rail, Women's Engineering Society (WES) and the Women’s Transportation Seminar London Chapter (WTS) now known as Women in Transport.

In 2015, the campaign raised awareness to the low representation of females in this industry by commemorating the 100 years of Maida Vale tube station (the first to be fully staffed by women), and holding a debate competition between year 9 students from 30 schools across the UK with engineering and construction company, Bechtel. The winning team was composed by four girls from St Marylebone School.

The programme also profiled several women that are currently in the industry to showcase the variety of careers available within transport.

In November 2015, the campaign celebrated 100 years since the first female bus conductor, Ms G. Duncan, started to work in London on 1 November 1915.
