= Warwick Avenue tube station =

London Underground station

Warwick Avenue
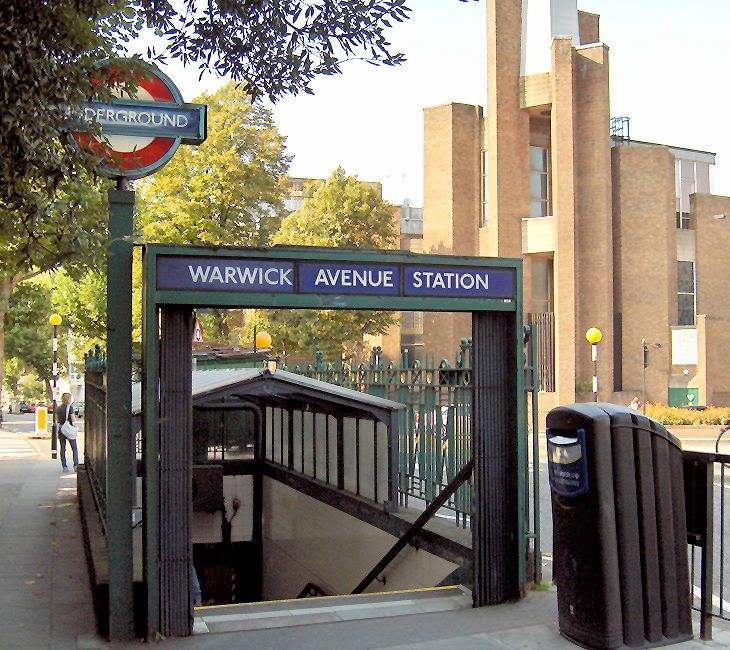
- Station entrance
- Interactive map of Warwick Avenue

General information
- Location: Little Venice
- Local authority: City of Westminster
- Managed by: London Underground
- Number of platforms: 2
- Fare zone: 2

London Underground annual entry and exit
- 2021: ▼1.67 million
- 2022: ▲2.87 million
- 2023: ▲3.02 million
- 2024: ▼3.00 million
- 2025: 3.00 million

Railway companies
- Original company: London Electric Railway

Key dates
- 31 January 1915: Opened

Other information
- External links: TfL station info page
- Coordinates: 51.523270°N 0.183677°W

Warwick Avenue (/ˈwɒrɪk ˈævənjuː/) is a London Underground station, located in Little Venice in the City of Westminster, north-west London. It is on the Bakerloo line, between Maida Vale and Paddington stations. It is in London fare zone 2.

== History ==
Warwick Avenue opened on 31 January 1915 on the Bakerloo line's extension from Paddington to Queen's Park.

The ticket hall and its ticket machines were destroyed by fire overnight on 17 September 1985, causing the station to be closed for the day.

== Design ==
There is no surface building and the station is accessed by two sets of steps to a sub-surface ticket hall. It was one of the first London Underground stations built specifically to use escalators rather than lifts.

== Location ==
The station is located at the junction of Warwick Avenue, Warrington Crescent and Clifton Gardens. For a time prior to its opening, the proposed name for the station was Warrington Crescent.

London Bus Routes 6, 46 and 187 serve the station.

== In popular culture ==
The song "Warwick Avenue" by British singer Duffy makes reference to the station.

Preceding station	London Underground	Following station
Maida Vale towards Harrow & Wealdstone	Bakerloo line	Paddington towards Elephant & Castle
