= Paddington tube station (Bakerloo, Circle and District lines) =

London Underground station

Paddington
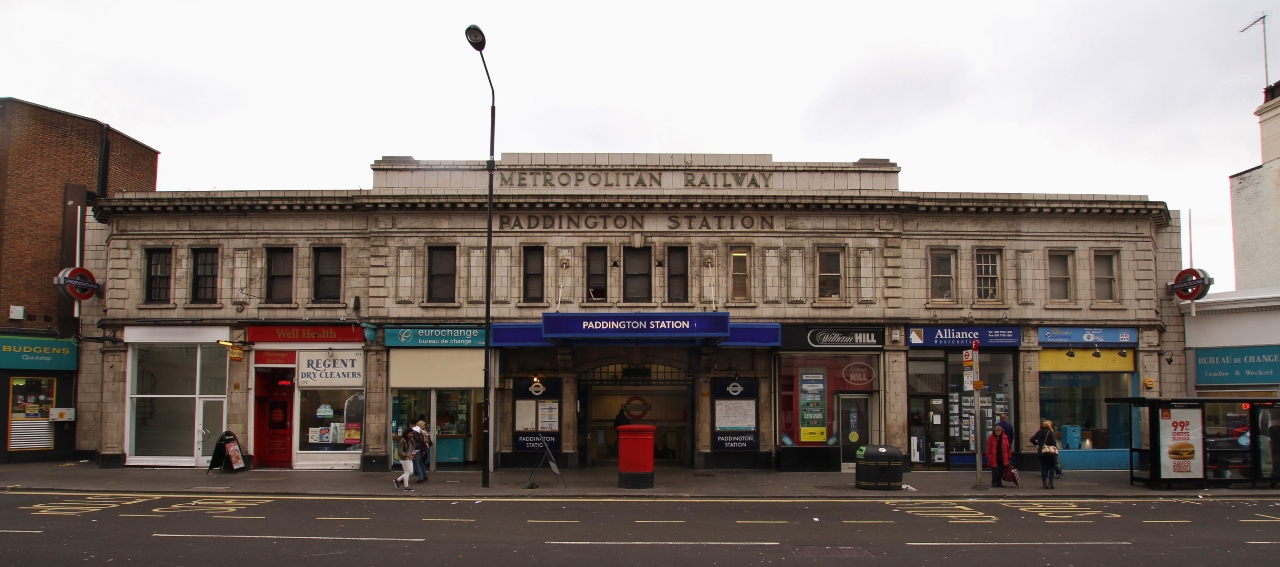
- Entrance on Praed Street
- Interactive map of Paddington

General information
- Location: Paddington
- Local authority: City of Westminster
- Managed by: London Underground
- Number of platforms: 4
- Accessible: Yes (change between Circle and District lines)
- Fare zone: 1
- OSI: Paddington; Paddington Circle and Hammersmith & City lines station

London Underground annual entry and exit
- 2021: ▲20.44 million
- 2022: ▲46.65 million
- 2023: ▲48.55 million
- 2024: ▲54.01 million
- 2025: ▲57.97 million

Key dates
- 1868: Opened (MR)
- 1913: Opened (BS&WR, as terminus)
- 1915: Extension (BS&WR)
- 1926: Started (District line)
- 1949: Started (Circle line)

Listed status
- Listed feature: Circle and District line Station
- Listing grade: II
- Entry number: 1392020
- Added to list: 11 August 2003

Other information
- External links: TfL station info page
- Coordinates: 51.5154°N 0.1754°W

Paddington is a London Underground station in Paddington. It is located on Praed Street to the south of Paddington mainline station and has entrances from Praed Street and from within the mainline station. This station is served by three lines: Bakerloo, Circle and District. On the Bakerloo line, the station is between Warwick Avenue and Edgware Road stations. On the Circle line and the Edgware Road branch of the District line, it is between Bayswater and Edgware Road stations. It is in London fare zone 1.

The station is in two parts: sub-surface platforms, opened in 1868, and deep-level platforms, opened in 1913. It is one of two separate Underground stations of the same name. The other station, to the north of the mainline station, is served by the Circle and Hammersmith & City lines. Although shown on the London Underground map as a single station, the two stations are not directly linked and interchange between them is via the concourse of the mainline station.

== History ==
=== Sub-surface station ===
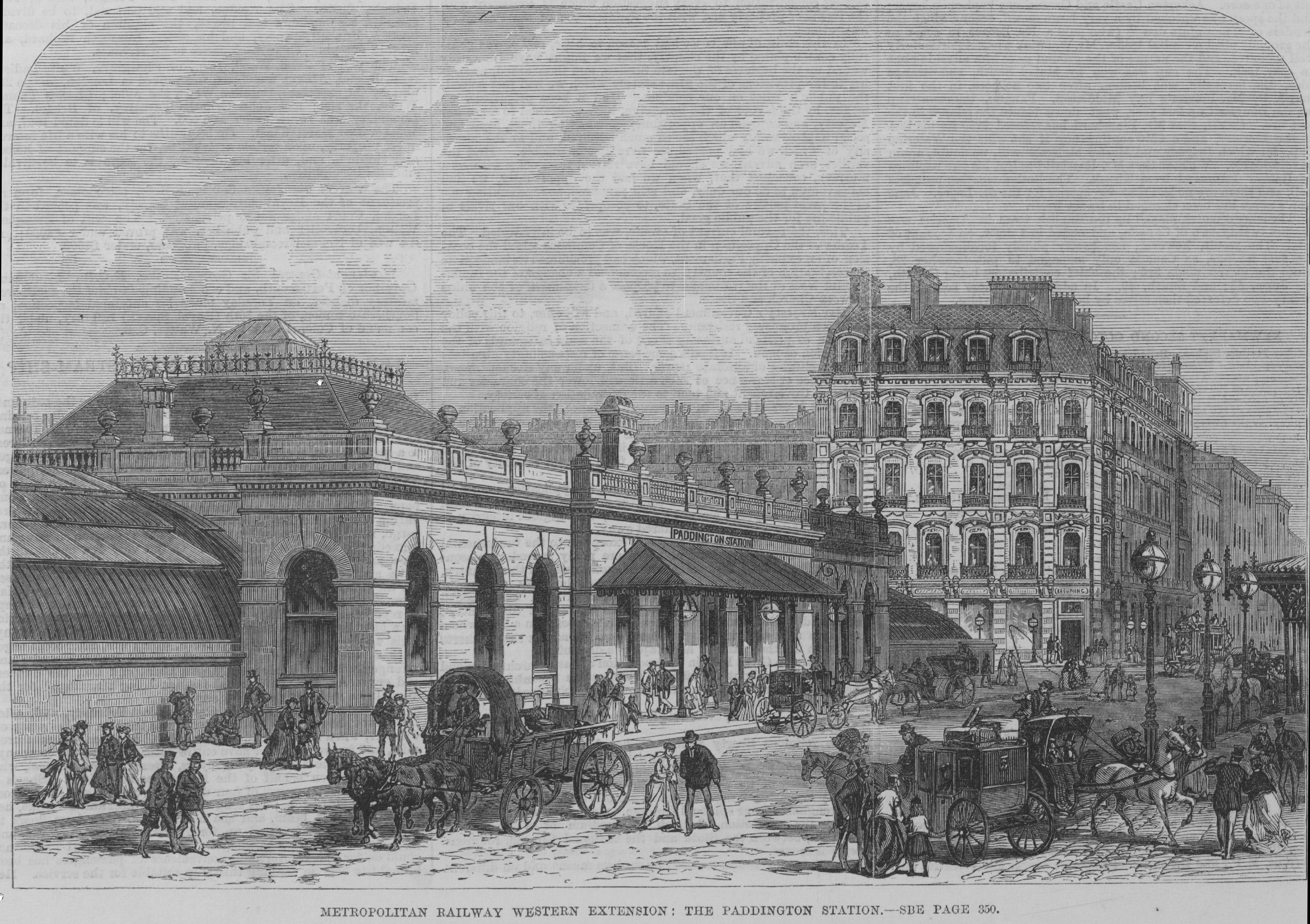
Exterior, 1868

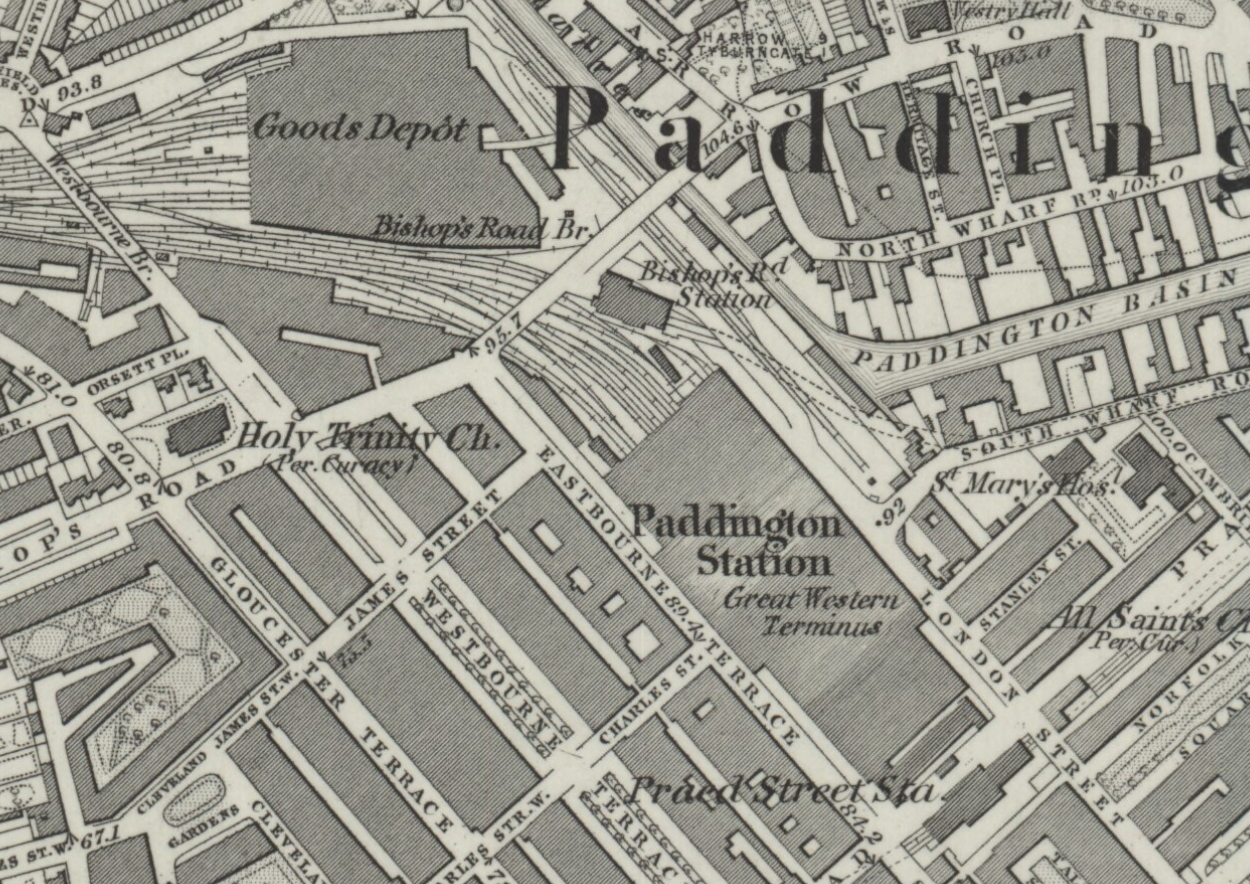
Metropolitan Railway station south of Paddington GWR passenger station, 1874

The Circle line and District line share tracks in the sub-surface station. It was opened as Paddington (Praed Street) by the Metropolitan Railway (MR, later the Metropolitan line) on 1 October 1868 when the company opened a branch from its main route between Hammersmith and Moorgate Street. The branch ran southwards to Gloucester Road and was planned as part of the Inner Circle, a circuitous route being constructed in conjunction with the District Railway (DR, now the District line) that was intended to link most of the capital's mainline stations. (Note: The extension had been approved by the Metropolitan Railway (Notting Hill and Brompton Extension) Act which received royal assent on 29 July 1864. A second act, the Metropolitan Railway (Tower Hill Extension) Act, received royal assent on the same day permitting the MR to extend its line eastwards from Moorgate to Tower of London.) The extension was constructed mostly in shallow tunnels using the cut-and-cover technique. (Note: Two months after opening the extension to Gloucester Road, The MR was extended again to South Kensington to connect to the DR when it opened on 24 December 1868 between South Kensington and Westminster Bridge.) Services were provided by both the MR and the DR, with each company running Inner Circle trains over the other's tracks.

The station has two platforms positioned in a cutting partially covered with a glazed roof and partially exposed to the atmosphere. It was designed by John Fowler, the MR's chief engineer. The brick-built street-level entrance building featured a balustrade along the edge of the roof decoratively topped with urns. Fowler's building was demolished and reconstructed to a design by the MR's architect Charles W Clark in 1914 with a cladding of white faïence blocks. The building is listed Grade II by Historic England. The brickwork of the platform retaining walls was restored in 1986 during a renovation of the station.

The station was the second opened by the MR at Paddington. The earlier station, named Paddington (Bishop's Road), opened on 10 January 1863. It is north of the mainline station and is served by trains on the Hammersmith branch.

From 1 November 1926, the MR provided all Inner Circle services. DR services on the west side of the circular route terminated at Edgware Road using two platforms that had been constructed by the MR for an abandoned plan for a new route between Edgware Road and Finchley Road. "Praed Street" was dropped from the name of the sub-surface station on 11 July 1947 to match the name used for the deep-level platforms. From 1949, the Circle line was identified on tube maps as a separate line replacing the Metropolitan line service.

The sub-surface station has twice been damaged by explosions. On 30 October 1883, a bomb planted by Fenians campaigning for an independent Irish Republic exploded on a train near the station. The bomb damaged the train it was on and a passing train along with part of the station and the signal box. Sixty-two passengers were injured. (Note: A few minutes after the Praed Street explosion, a bomb exploded in the tunnel between Charing Cross (now Embankment) and Westminster stations, though no trains were damaged or passengers injured in this incident.) On the night of 13 October 1940, the station was hit by German bombs dropped during the Blitz, killing five people in the station; four more subsequently died of injuries.

=== Deep-level station ===
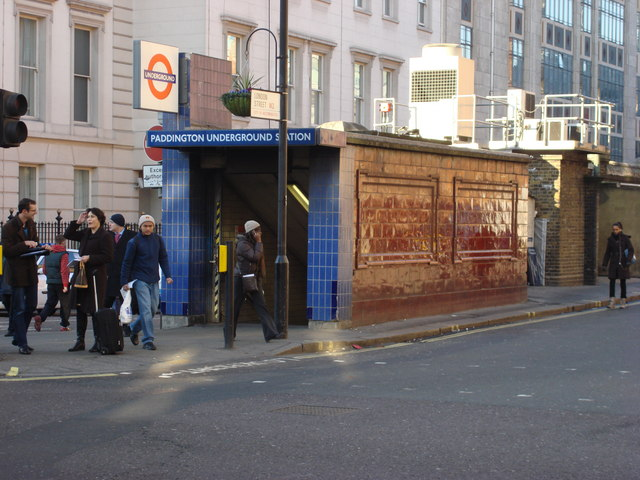
Former pedestrian entrance to Bakerloo line on the corner of London Street and Praed Street

The deep-level station was opened by the Baker Street and Waterloo Railway (BS&WR, later the Bakerloo line) on 1 December 1913 as the temporary terminus of its extension from Edgware Road. To enable the BS&WR to continue its route to the north-west of Paddington, the station platforms were constructed in a tight curve. A cross-over between tracks and reversing tunnels were provided beyond the new station. Construction work continued beyond the station to extend the line further to Queen's Park where it met the mainline tracks of the London and North Western Railway. The extension opened in stages, with the first trains running to and from Warwick Avenue on 31 January 1915.

Unlike most previous BS&WR stations, a separate station building was not constructed at Paddington. A small pedestrian entrance on the north-west corner of the junction of London Street and Praed Street provides access to the below-ground ticket hall. Following their successful introduction at Earl's Court in 1911, the station was the first on the line to be designed to use escalators instead of lifts.

=== 1980s refurbishment ===
The ticket hall and platforms are decorated with tiling designs by David Hamilton installed during a £6 million refurbishment of the station between 1984 and 1987 incorporating elements of technical drawings by Marc Isambard Brunel and other engineers.

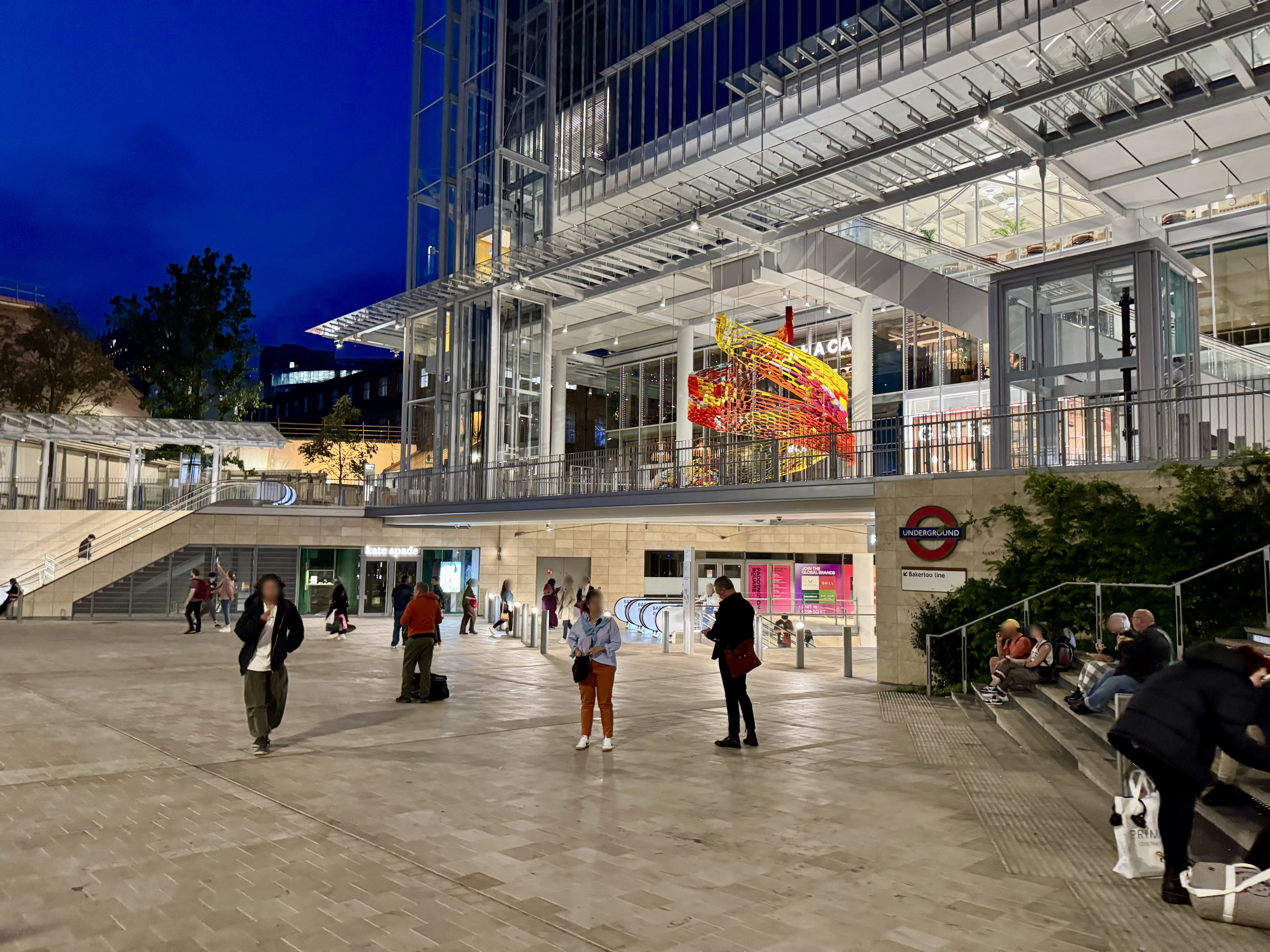
Entrance to the Paddington Square shopping mall, which contains the new Bakerloo line ticket hall on its lower level.

=== New Bakerloo line ticket hall ===
In December 2016, Westminster City Council approved proposals to construct a new mixed-use development called Paddington Square on a site adjacent to the mainline station. The plans include reconstruction of parts of the Bakerloo line station, providing a new ticket hall – four times larger than the current ticket hall, and twice the number of ticket barriers – as well as step free access between the Bakerloo line platforms and street level via two lifts. The new ticket hall opened in September 2024.

=== Connection to Elizabeth line ===
As part of the construction of the Crossrail project, a new 170m long pedestrian tunnel was dug from the Bakerloo line platforms to the new Paddington Elizabeth line station at a cost of £40m. To achieve this, the Bakerloo line station was closed for 5 months in 2016 to allow for construction to take place, as well as the replacement of escalators. The new link will include 2 escalators, as well as lifts allowing the Bakerloo line platforms to become accessible for the first time – albeit via the Elizabeth line station entrances.

== Arrangement ==
The station has three ticket halls: one for the Circle and District lines above the platforms of the sub-surface station, one below ground for the Bakerloo line station and one under the mainline station. The sub-surface station and the deep-level station ticket halls are linked via the ticket hall under the mainline station, but not to each other directly. Entrances are on Praed Street and from within the mainline station. On the tube map the station is shown jointly with the other separate Underground station and passenger usage data for both is combined. Interchange with the other station is through the mainline station concourse without extra charge if the change is made within the permitted time. (Note: Although the two Paddington Underground stations are only about 400 metres (440 yd) apart geographically, the distance by rail on the Circle line without changing trains is 20.84 kilometres (12.95 mi) around almost the whole of the line's loop section.)

== Services ==
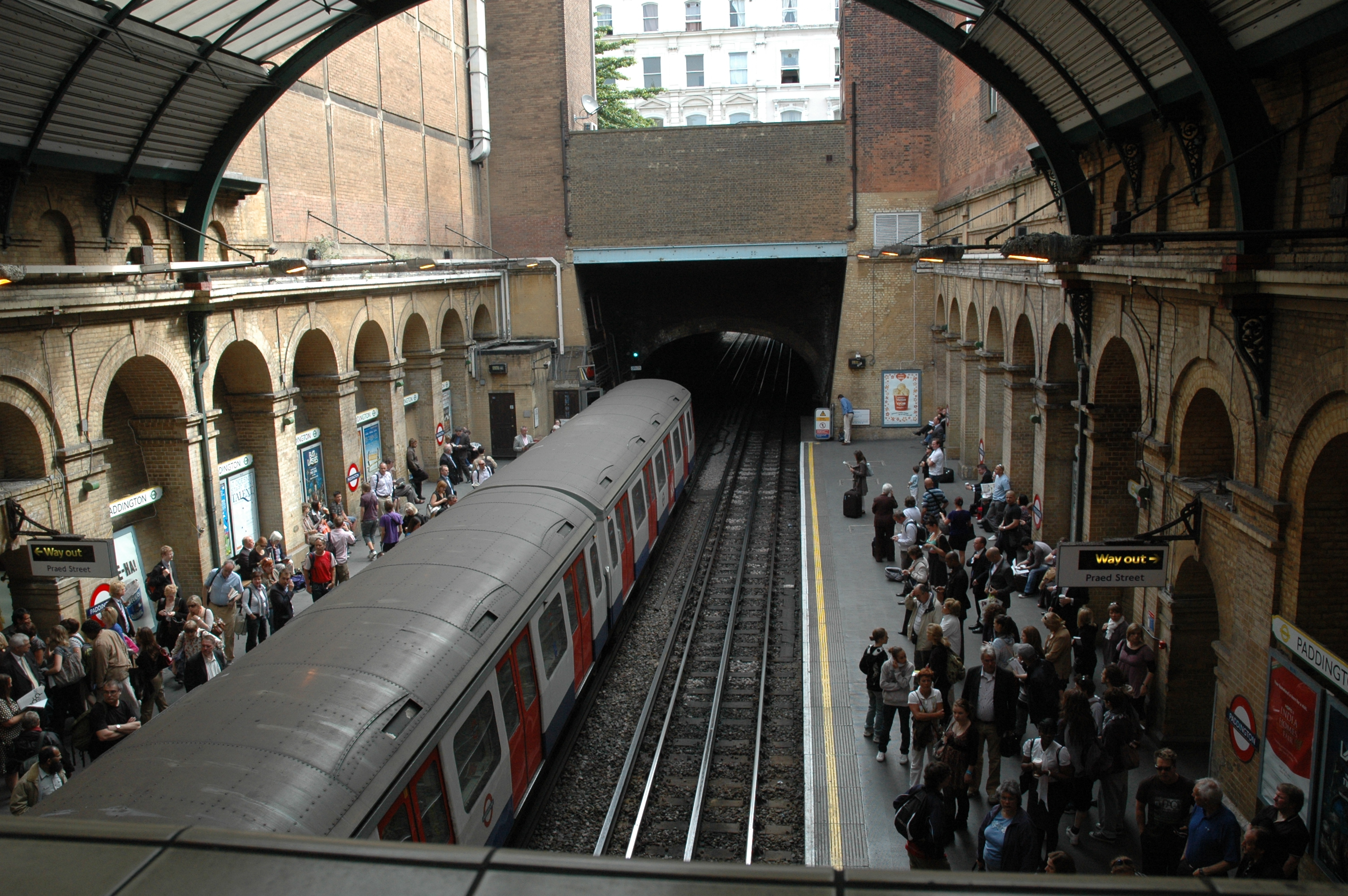
Circle and District line platforms looking east towards Edgware Road station

Paddington station is on the Bakerloo, Circle and District lines in London fare zone 1. On the Bakerloo line, the station is between Warwick Avenue and Edgware Road (Bakerloo line). On the Circle line and the Edgware Road branch of the District line, it is between Bayswater and Edgware Road (Circle, District and Hammersmith & City lines).

Train frequencies vary throughout the day, but, generally, Circle line trains run every 10 minutes from approximately 05:31 to 00:39 eastbound and 05:07 to 00:45 westbound; they are supplemented by District line trains that operate every 10 minutes from approximately 05:44 to 00:06 eastbound and 05:57 to 00:22 westbound. Some late night Circle line trains continue beyond Edgware Road. Bakerloo line trains generally operate every 3 minutes from approximately 05:45 to 00:22 southbound and 05:55 to 00:41 northbound.

Preceding station	London Underground	Following station
Warwick Avenue towards Harrow & Wealdstone	Bakerloo line	Edgware Road towards Elephant & Castle
Bayswater towards Hammersmith via Tower Hill	Circle line	Edgware Road Terminus
Bayswater towards Wimbledon	District line Edgware Road branch	Edgware Road Terminus

== Connections ==
The station is served by London Buses day and night via multiple routes running on Praed Street.
