= Queen's Park station (England) =

London Underground and London Overground station

Queen's Park
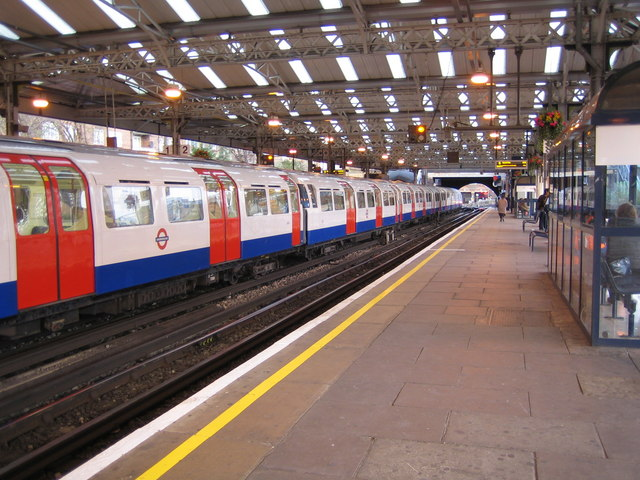
- A Bakerloo line train at the station
- Interactive map of Queen's Park

General information
- Location: Queen's Park
- Local authority: London Borough of Brent
- Grid reference: TQ245832
- Managed by: London Underground
- Owner: Network Rail
- Station code: QPW
- DfT category: C2
- Number of platforms: 6 (4 operational) (Note: Platforms 5 and 6 at Queen's Park have no regular service.)
- Fare zone: 2

London Underground annual entry and exit
- 2021: ▼2.38 million
- 2022: ▲4.15 million
- 2023: ▲4.37 million
- 2024: ▲4.55 million
- 2025: ▲4.70 million

National Rail annual entry and exit
- 2020–21: ▼1.674 million
- 2021–22: ▲3.378 million
- 2022–23: ▲3.854 million
- 2023–24: ▲4.183 million
- 2024–25: ▲4.882 million

Railway companies
- Original company: London and North Western Railway
- Pre-grouping: London and North Western Railway
- Post-grouping: London, Midland and Scottish Railway

Key dates
- 2 June 1879: Opened as Queen's Park (West Kilburn)
- 11 February 1915: Bakerloo line service introduced
- December 1954: Renamed Queen's Park

Other information
- External links: Departures; Facilities
- Coordinates: 51.5339°N 0.2063°W

Queen's Park is an interchange station in London. It is on the Bakerloo line of the London Underground and the Lioness line of the London Overground. On the Bakerloo line, the station is between Kensal Green and Kilburn Park stations. On the Lioness line, it is between Kensal Green and Kilburn High Road stations.

The station lies at the southern end of Salusbury Road, near the south-east corner of the public park from which the area now known as Queen's Park has taken its modern name. It is in London fare zone 2.

== History ==
The station was first opened by the London and North Western Railway (LNWR) on 2 June 1879, on the main line from London to Birmingham.

Services on the Bakerloo line were extended from Kilburn Park to Queen's Park on 11 February 1915. On 10 May 1915, Bakerloo services began to operate north of Queen's Park as far as Willesden Junction over the recently built Watford DC line tracks shared with the LNWR.

London Midland previously made three operational calls daily, which were not found in public timetables. As of the December 2013 timetable these stops no longer exist, with no main line services calling at the station.

== Station layout ==
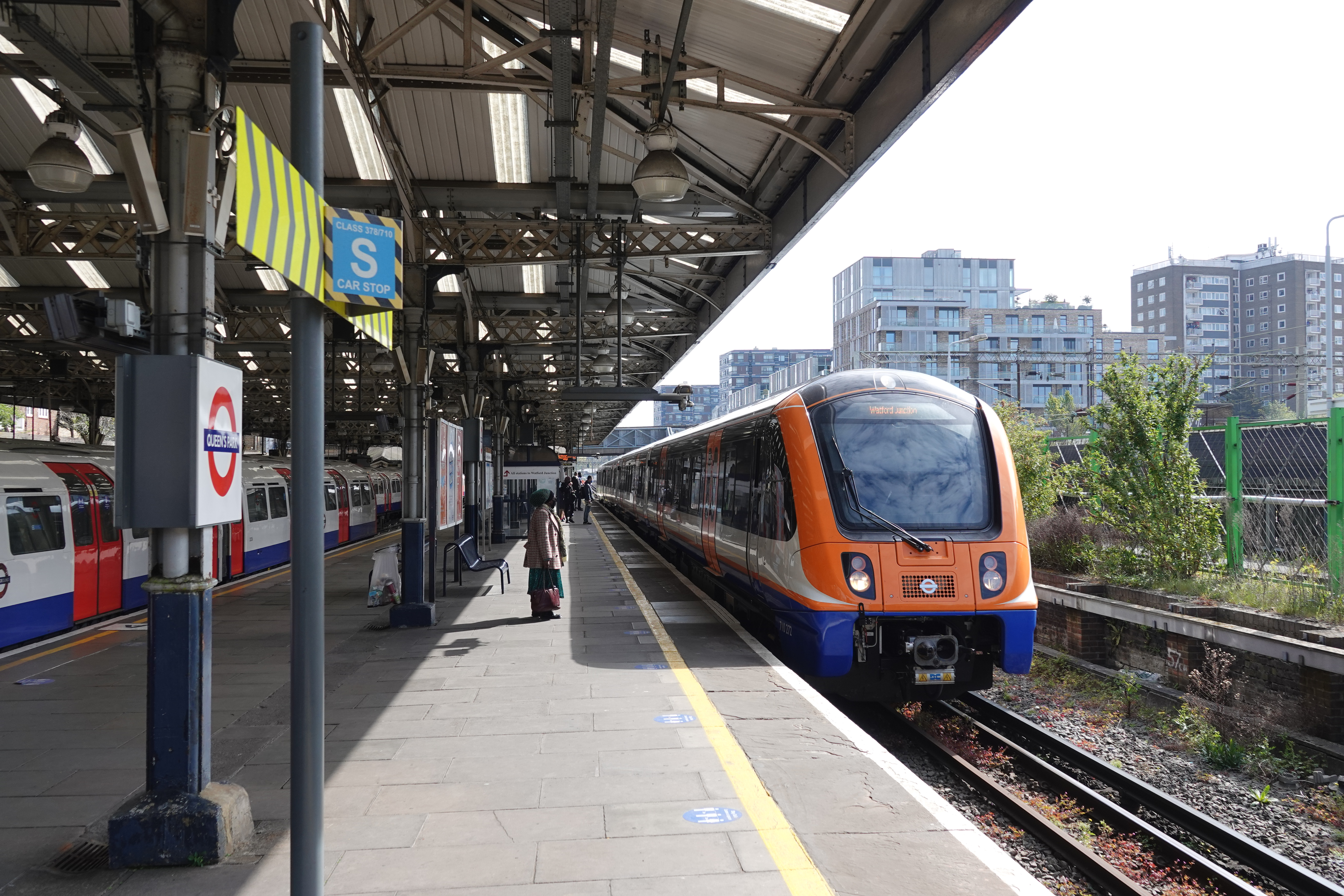
Cross-platform interchange of the Bakerloo and Lioness lines at Queen's Park station

All platforms at Queen's Park station are on the surface, the station being covered by a glazed roof. The slow main line platforms (platforms 5 and 6) are reserved for use during engineering work or partial line closures. The Bakerloo line tunnel portals are about 300 metres (980 ft) to the east of the station. The two inner station tracks, platforms 3 (westbound) and 2 (eastbound), split into four tracks in a carriage shed to the west of the station. Bakerloo line services starting or ending at Queen's Park normally do so in the two centre tracks of the four-track carriage shed. Bakerloo line trains joining or leaving the Watford DC line tracks (also used by the Lioness line) do so by passing through the carriage shed on one of the two outer tracks, which merge into the Watford DC line, the latter of which becomes the station's outer tracks. Around a third of Bakerloo line trains terminate at Queen's Park with others continuing onward to Harrow & Wealdstone.

All platforms are accessed by stairs and although there is local pressure for step-free access there are no firm plans for lifts or escalators to be installed. The stairs are all behind the ticket barriers.

== Services ==
Queen's Park is served by the Bakerloo line of the London Underground and the Lioness line of the London Overground. The current off-peak service is:

=== London Underground (Bakerloo line) ===
- 16 tph to Elephant & Castle
- 4 tph to Stonebridge Park
- 4 tph to Harrow & Wealdstone

8 tph from Elephant & Castle terminate at Queen's Park.

=== London Overground (Lioness line) ===
- 4 tph to Euston
- 4 tph to Watford Junction

Preceding station	London Underground	Following station
Kensal Green towards Harrow & Wealdstone	Bakerloo line	Kilburn Park towards Elephant & Castle
Preceding station	London Overground	Following station
Kensal Green towards Watford Junction	Lioness line Watford DC line	Kilburn High Road towards Euston
Historical railways
Willesden Junction	London and North Western Railway West Coast Main Line	Kilburn High Road

== Connections ==
London Buses routes 6, 36, 187, 206, and 316 serve the station.

== Future improvements ==
Great North Western Railway was given permission to run six trains per day from London to Blackpool North stopping at Queen's Park from 2018, but these plans have yet to come to fruition. Queen's Park may be the service's terminus, as stopping patterns including permission to run the service beyond Queen's Park to London Euston are dependent upon future infrastructural work to the West Coast Main Line.

New stabling sidings and reversing facility, as well as realignment of the tracks, could take place in preparation for new Siemens rolling stock for the Bakerloo line.
