= Fuel Juice Bars =

British chain of juice bars

Fuel Juice Bars Ltd
- Industry: juice bars
- Headquarters: Glasgow, UK
- Number of locations: 28 (April 2016)
- Area served: UK
- Products: juice

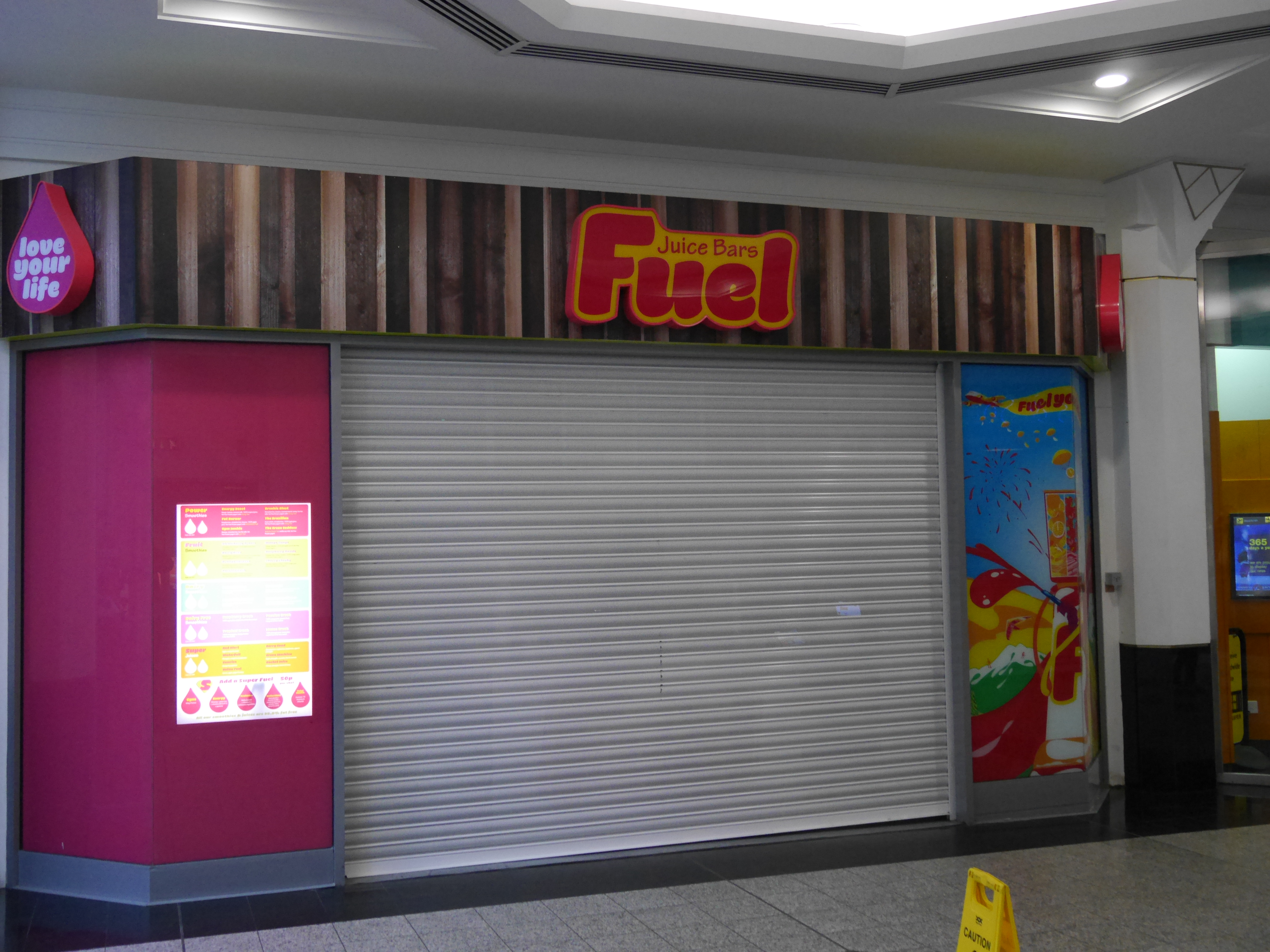
Fuel Juice, Putney Exchange, London

Fuel Juice Bars is a British company that operates a chain of juice bars, with 23 outlets in the UK. It is headquartered in Glasgow, Scotland, and was incorporated in 2004. It was previously named Skykirk Ltd.

In February 2015, Fuel topped the analysts Horizon's list of the fastest-growing "Ones to Watch" - restaurants or fast service concepts with from five to 25 outlets and an annual growth rate in outlet numbers of at least 20% over the past three years. Fuel Juice Bars have grown from eight units in 2011 to 23 in 2023.

Following investment by Kings Park Capital, Fuel Juice Bars agreed a restructuring plan with its creditors in 2018. Following the Company Voluntary Arrangement (CVA), Jamie Weston previous MD took over control of the company from Kings Park.
