= London General =

Bus operator in London, England

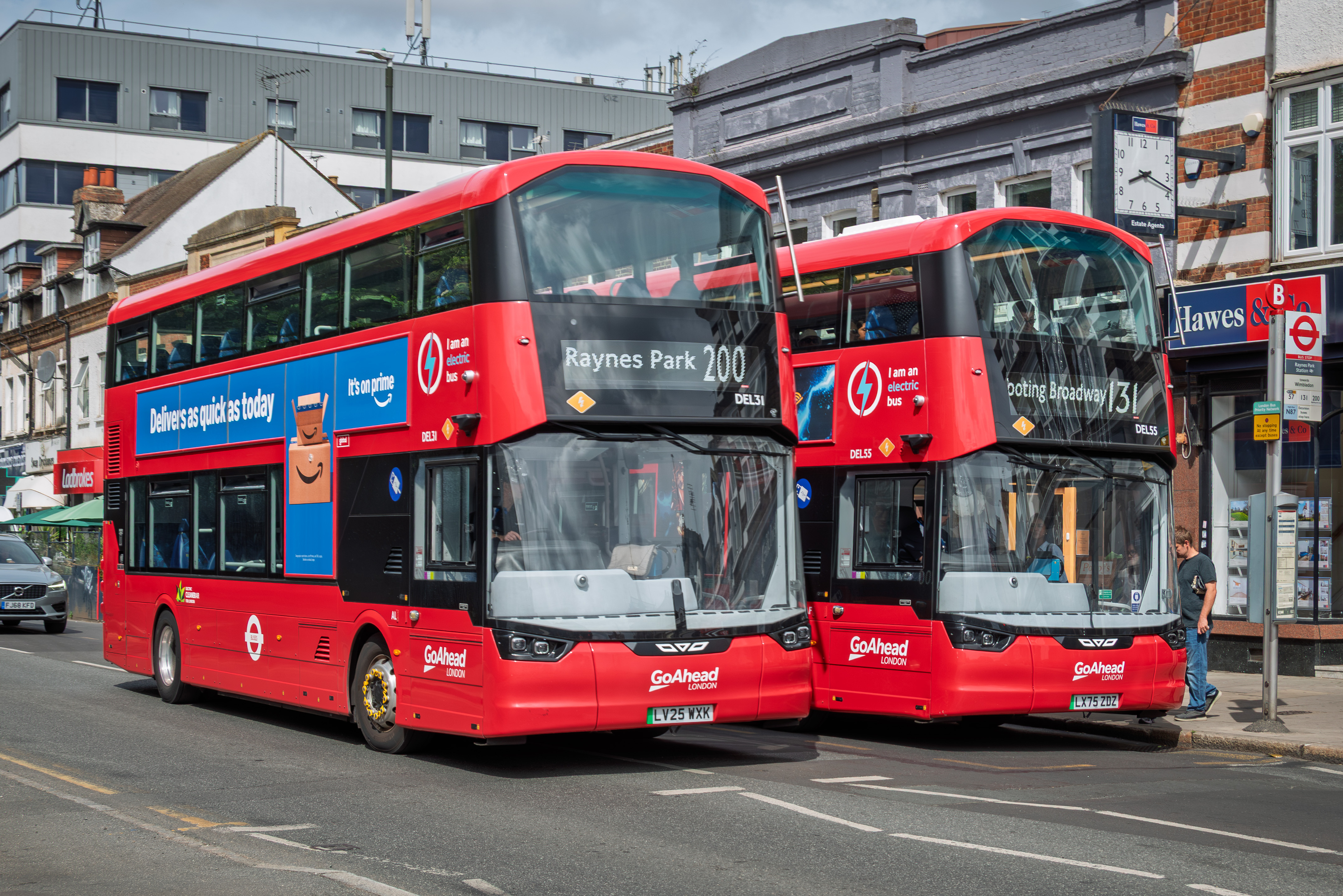
- Wright StreetDeck Electroliner buses at Raynes Park in May 2026
- Parent: Go-Ahead London
- Founded: 1 April 1989; 37 years ago
- Headquarters: Merton
- Service area: Greater London
- Service type: Bus services
- Depots: 7
- Website: www.goaheadlondon.com

London General is a bus operator brand under London General Transport Services Limited, trading as Go-Ahead London. It is a subsidiary of Go-Ahead London and operates services in Greater London under contract to Transport for London. The company is named after the London General Omnibus Company, the principal operator of buses in London between 1855 and 1933.

== History ==
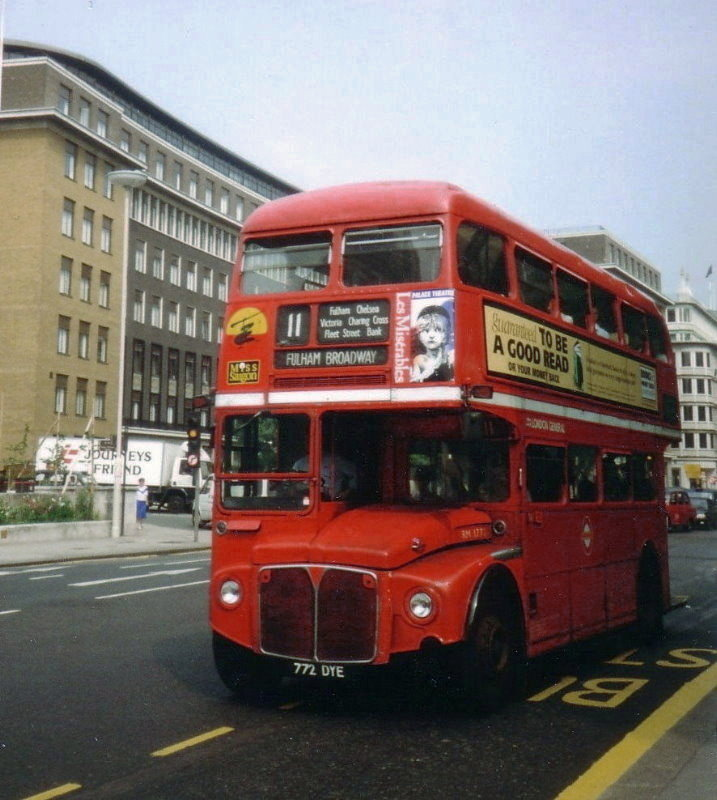
AEC Routemaster operating route 11 in June 1993

In April 1989, London Buses was divided into 11 separate business units, one of which revived the London General Omnibus Company name as London General Transport Services; the new London General's original logo featured a representation of a LGOC B-type bus in reflection of the name's history.

In November 1994, London General was sold in a management buyout for £28 million (equivalent to £60,257,000 in 2025), before being sold to the Go-Ahead Group for £46 million (equivalent to £97,059,000 in 2025) in May 1996.

Having previously been based at London General House in Mitcham, Surrey, the company moved its offices to an address in Merton, adjacent to the Merton bus garage. In August 2008, Go-Ahead's London bus operations all adopted the Go-Ahead London trading name, although the individual company names are still applied beneath the logo on most buses.

In August 2009, Go-Ahead purchased East Thames Buses from Transport for London for £5 million, incorporating the business, consisting of two small bus garages, 133 buses and 460 employees, into London General. Although Transport for London's normal practice is to put routes out for tender, London General began a new five-year contract for all East Thames Buses routes without going through the tendering process.

In March 2012, First London's Northumberland Park garage was purchased by the Go-Ahead Group for £14 million and integrated into London General's operations.

== Garages ==
London General operates seven bus garages.

=== Ellis Road (GM) ===
Ellis Road garage operates routes 80 and 470.

==== History ====
Goat Road (now Ellis Road) was opened on 25 March 2023 as a replacement for Waterside Way (PL) garage, with routes, staff and vehicles transferring from Waterside Way after London General's lease on the site expired. The depot uses the code 'GM', last used for the operator's Victoria garage on Gillingham Street.

=== Merton (AL) ===
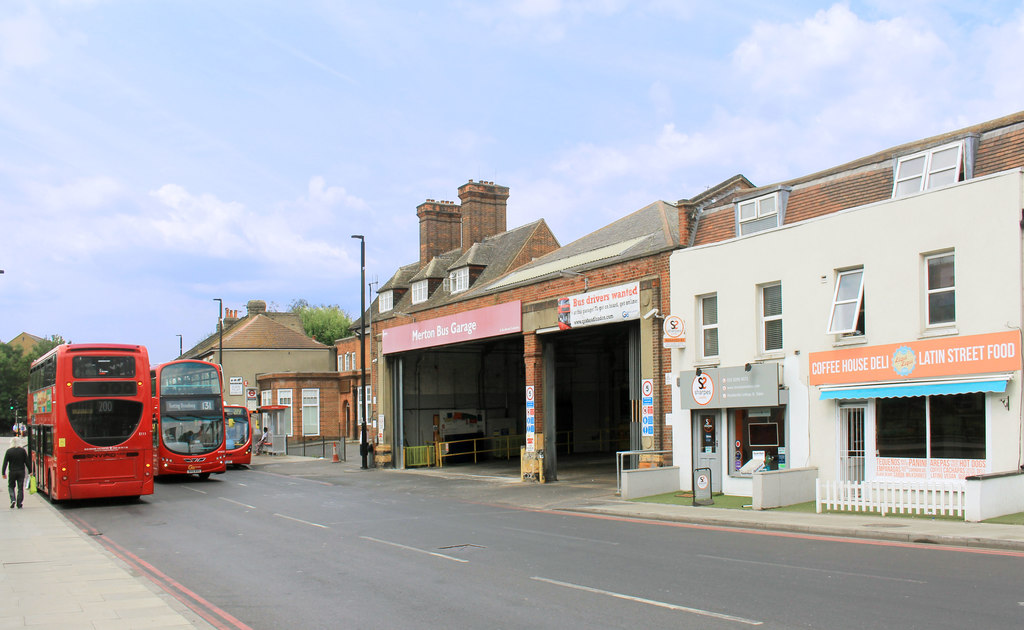
Merton bus garage entrance from Merton High Street, July 2018

Merton garage operates routes 57, 131, 152, 163, 164, 200, 219, 280 and 413.

==== History ====
Merton was, for many years, the largest of the London General Omnibus Company's garages and continued to boast high allocations in the early days of London Transport. The garage was modernised in 1960, and again in 1991 when a new roof was fitted and various stores and welfare areas were moved to provide a larger, unobstructed parking area, which had previously been long and narrow.

Merton garage was responsible for the maintenance of vehicles for route 200 between 1988 and 1989 after the withdrawal of the Cityrama sightseeing company, whilst the route was operated from Sutton garage.

The garage has become Go-Ahead London's head office, following the sale of Raleigh House, Mitcham and the acquisition of the former pub (King's Head, Merton) next door.

=== Northumberland Park (NP) ===
Northumberland Park garage operates routes 91, 106, 123, 144, 184, 212, 230, 232, 299, 318, 357, 389, 399, 444, 456, 476, 677, N91 and W15.

==== History ====
Located adjacent to the Northumberland Park railway station and the Victoria line depot, Northumberland Park bus garage was opened in 1991 to house the Walthamstow Citybus operation, a subsidiary of Capital Citybus formed when the operator acquired tenders for routes operated by the collapsed London Forest LRT business unit. Capital Citybus was bought out by a management team in late 1995, and subsequently by FirstGroup in 1998, becoming First Capital.

In March 2012, the FirstGroup sold Northumberland Park garage, together with its 13 Transport for London route contracts, fleet of 130 buses vehicles and around 400 staff members, to the Go-Ahead Group for £12 million, with the garage's operations integrated into London General.

=== Putney (AF) ===
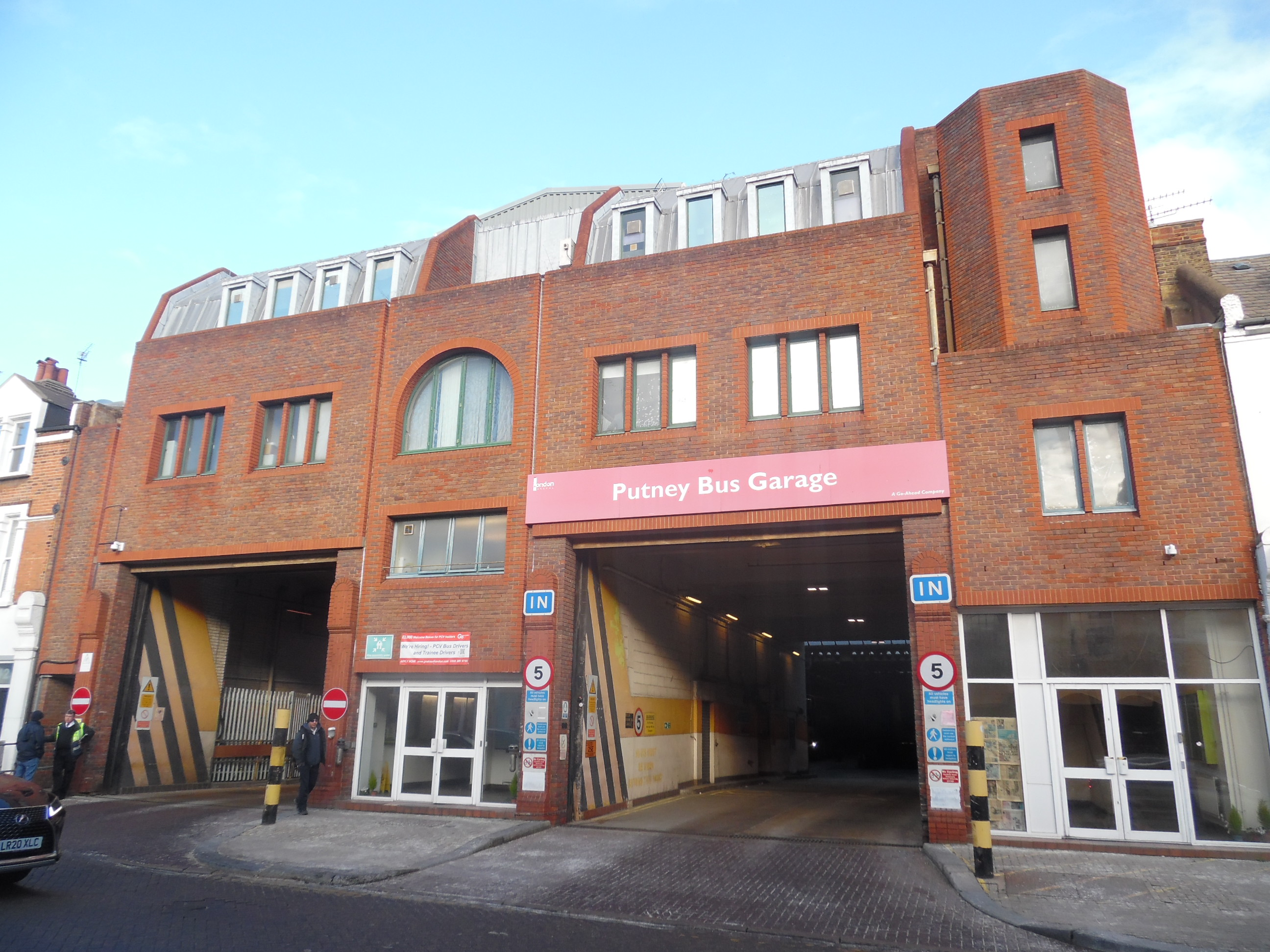
Forecourt of Putney bus garage from Chelverton Road, January 2023

Putney garage operates routes 14, 22, 39, 74, 265, 430, N22, N74 and N97.

==== History ====
With its ancestry going back to the horse-drawn omnibus days of the 1880s, Chelverton Road Garage was converted to a motor-bus garage in 1912. The garage is well hidden in a side road with a modest frontage, yet it has an allocation of 112. It has been modernised twice, firstly in 1935 and then again in 1985. The garage was well known for being allocated the pre-war RTs in 1940, which displaced the STLs. During the war the garage was under-utilised and was used to store de-licensed buses. Renamed Putney, in 1963, after the closure of Putney Bridge Garage (F), it started to receive both short and long wheelbase AEC Routemasters for its Central London routes. The Routemasters remained at the garage until July 2005, when both the 14 and 22 were converted to low floor one-person-operated buses.

=== Stockwell (SW) ===
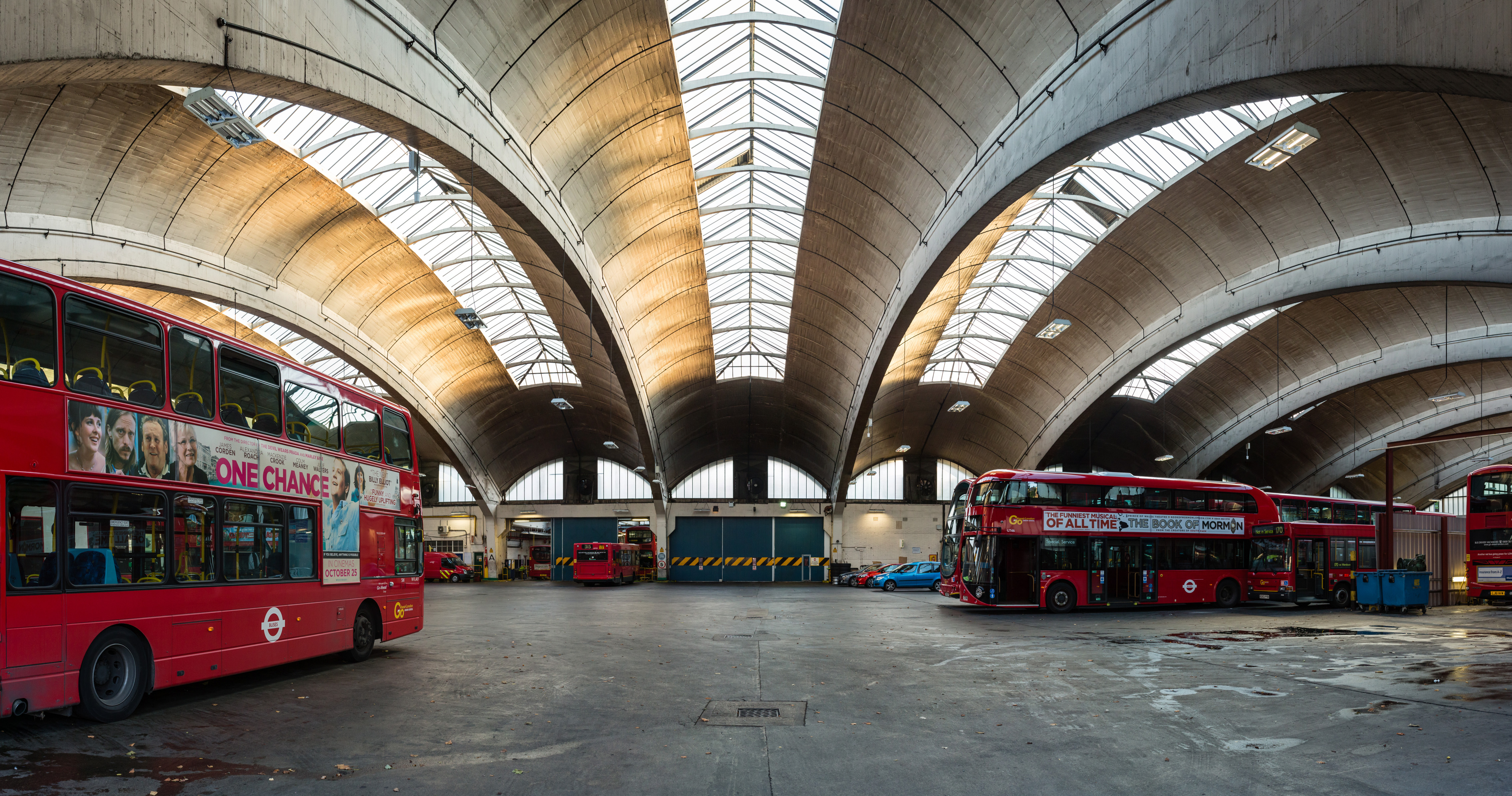
A panoramic view of the interior of Stockwell garage, October 2013

Stockwell garage operates routes 11, 44, 77, 87, 88, 155, 170, 333, 424, N11, N44, N87 and N155.

==== History ====
Stockwell garage opened in 1952 as part of London Transport's tram replacement programme after nearly four years of planning and building, with many construction materials short of supply in the aftermath of World War II and problems rehousing residents of the houses that stood on the site. Stockwell garage is a Grade II listed building, and when built was a masterpiece of architectural design incorporating a new roof structure that did not need supports which enabled for a 73,350-square-foot (6,814 m^{2}) unobstructed parking space. The offices and workshops are on the edges of the garage but do not take up any of the parking spaces.

In the first few days of operation, Stockwell garage ran just 11 buses on route 178 which had moved from Rye Lane (Peckham), but then gained more work from the next stage of the tram replacement programme for which it had been designed, but it was still well short of capacity. More work arrived in late 1953 and early 1954 when routes 77 and 77A (now 87) moved from Victoria garage due to recruitment problems, and the closure of Nunhead garage which increased the peak vehicle requirement of Stockwell to 110 buses. In the early 1970s, the Round London Sightseeing Tours moved to Stockwell.

Between spring 1984 and August 1986, Stockwell operated a varied fleet of double-decker buses on route 170 as part of London Transport's Alternative Vehicle Evaluation comparative trial, aimed at finding a new standard double-decker bus type. The vehicles trialled included a pair of MCW Metrobus Mk2s, one of which was built with a Maxwell transmission while the other had a Cummins L10 transmission, three ECW-bodied Leyland Olympians, three Northern Counties-bodied Dennis Dominators and three Alexander-bodied Volvo Ailsas, the latter being the first front-engined buses delivered to London Transport since the last Routemasters were delivered in 1968. The trial ultimately concluded in favour of the ECW-bodied Leyland Olympian, with London Transport taking delivery of a further 260 between 1986 and 1987.

=== Sutton (A) ===
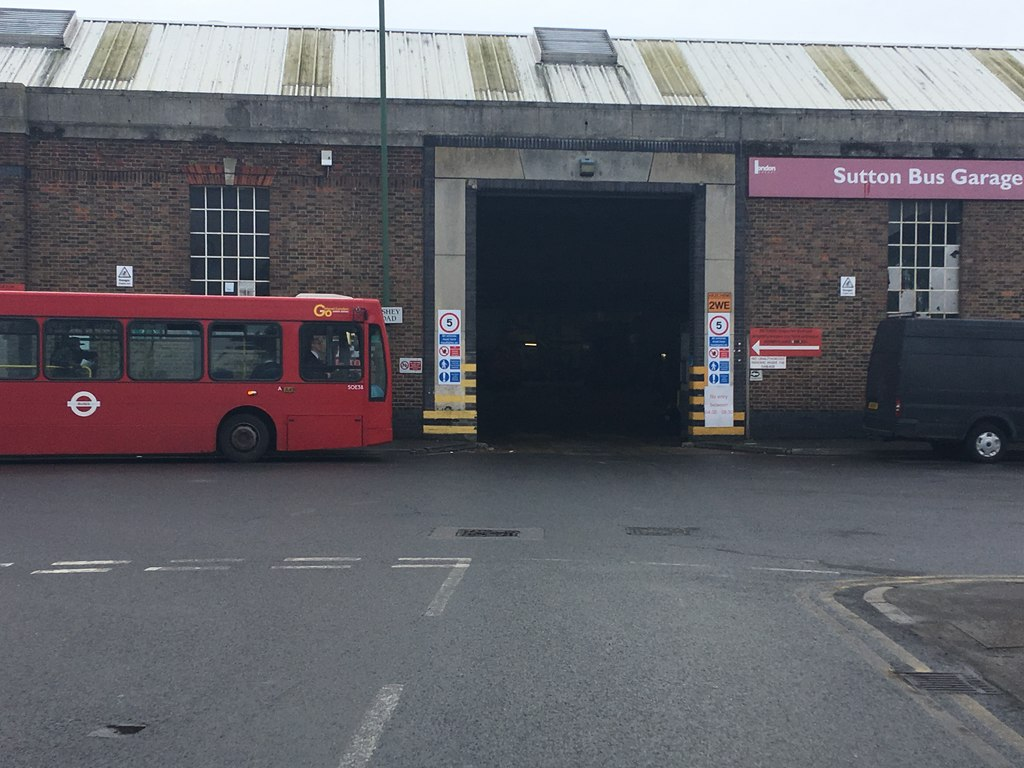
Sutton bus garage from Bushey Road, April 2018

Sutton garage operates routes 80, 93, 151, 154, 213 and S2.

==== History ====
Opened by the London General Omnibus Company in January 1924 at cost of £30,000, Sutton garage had a capacity for 100 buses. During its early years, less than half of the garage was put to use, holding only 40 buses by 1926. This would change somewhat by the extension of the Underground to Morden and major house-building projects in the area.

Between 1945 and 1953, it had an allocation of exactly 100 relaxed-Utility Daimlers (classed as Ds) numbered from D182 - D281. By 1952, the garage had 128 buses allocated, achieved mainly by parking buses in surrounding streets. However, this would soon fall again, to 100 in 1966, 82 in 1976 and 62 in 1987.

The garage passed to the reborn London General bus company in the run-up to privatisation in 1985. Sutton Garage also partly took control of route 200 at a yard in Colliers Wood (AA) in 1989, after Cityrama withdrew from their contract. Sutton was responsible for providing drivers for the service, whilst Merton garage were contracted to do the maintenance. By 1994, the garage allocation had grown to 85 buses and again to 92 in 2001.

=== Waterloo (RA) ===
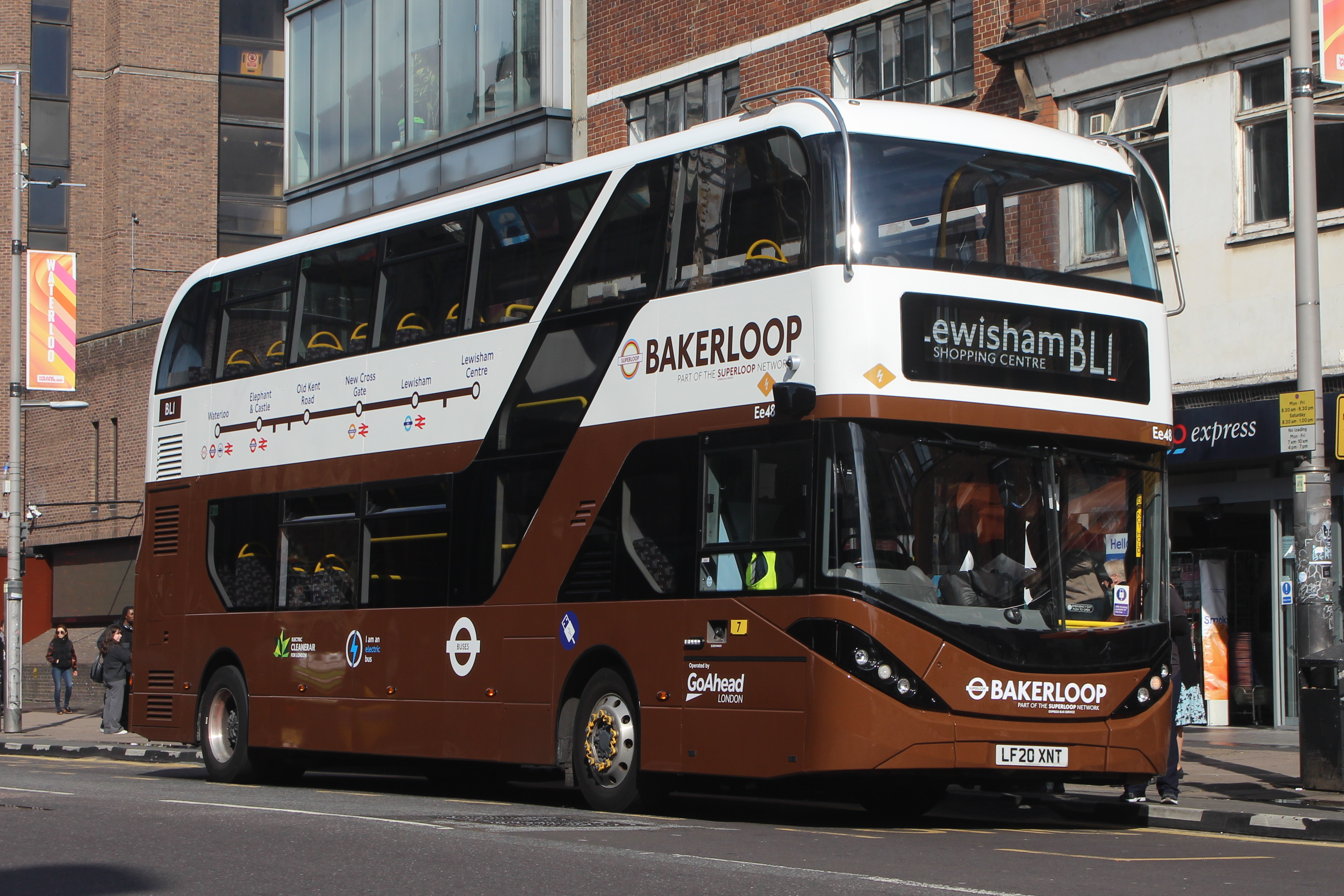
BYD Alexander Dennis Enviro400EV on route BL1 at Waterloo station in September 2025

Waterloo garage operates routes 14, 214 and BL1.

==== History ====
The site was first used as a storage and servicing location for buses attending the Festival of Britain in 1951. The garage opened in the early 1980s as a Red Arrow garage (hence the RA code) and in the 1990s had an allocation of AEC Routemasters for route 11. In June 2002, the Red Arrow Leyland Nationals were replaced by London's first fleet of Mercedes-Benz Citaro articulated buses. Because of the extra space required to stable these, the route 11 Routemasters were transferred to Stockwell garage. In September 2009 the articulated fleet was replaced by Mercedes-Benz O530 Citaros. In 2016, the garage was converted to become fully electric, the first bus depot in Europe to do so. On 29 April 2023, routes 507 and 521 were withdrawn. On 27 September 2025, route BL1 was launched and operate for the areas covered by the proposed Bakerloo line extension.

== Former garages ==
=== Battersea Base (BB) ===
Battersea Base was located adjacent to the former London Transport Battersea Garage on Hester Road, Battersea. The base opened in June 1993 to accommodate midibus services displaced from the closure of Victoria garage. The small base was closed in June 1998, with services being moved to Putney & Stockwell garages.

=== Belvedere (BV) ===
Belvedere bus garage was located at Burt's Wharf on Crabtree Manorway North in Lower Belvedere. The garage had been opened by Harris Bus in February 1998 to replace their base at Crayford. Harris Bus was later to enter administration, resulting in London Regional Transport forming East Thames Buses in 1999 to take over the vehicles and routes; including the site at Belvedere. East Thames Buses was later sold to London General in October 2009. Given the site's distance from London General's other garages, maintenance would often be carried out at London Central's Bexleyheath garage located nearby, with vehicle allocations frequently being swapped when necessary. The garage closed in December 2017 with routes being transferred to London Central's Bexleyheath & Morden Wharf garages.

=== Mandela Way (MW) ===
Mandela Way bus garage, located on Mandela Way in Southwark, opened on 15 October 2005 as a training depot and was located adjacent to the East Thames Buses garage of the same name. From November 2007, the allocation for route 133 was moved from Stockwell to Mandela Way, followed by an allocation of articulated buses for route 453 from February 2008 after London General won the contract from Selkent. Later acquisitions included routes 1, 100, 507, 521 & N1. The garage closed on 28 July 2017 following a decision by the freeholder to not renew the lease for the site. The routes, vehicles and staff were transferred to London Central's New Cross & Camberwell garages, and Docklands Buses' Silvertown garage.

=== Victoria (GM) ===
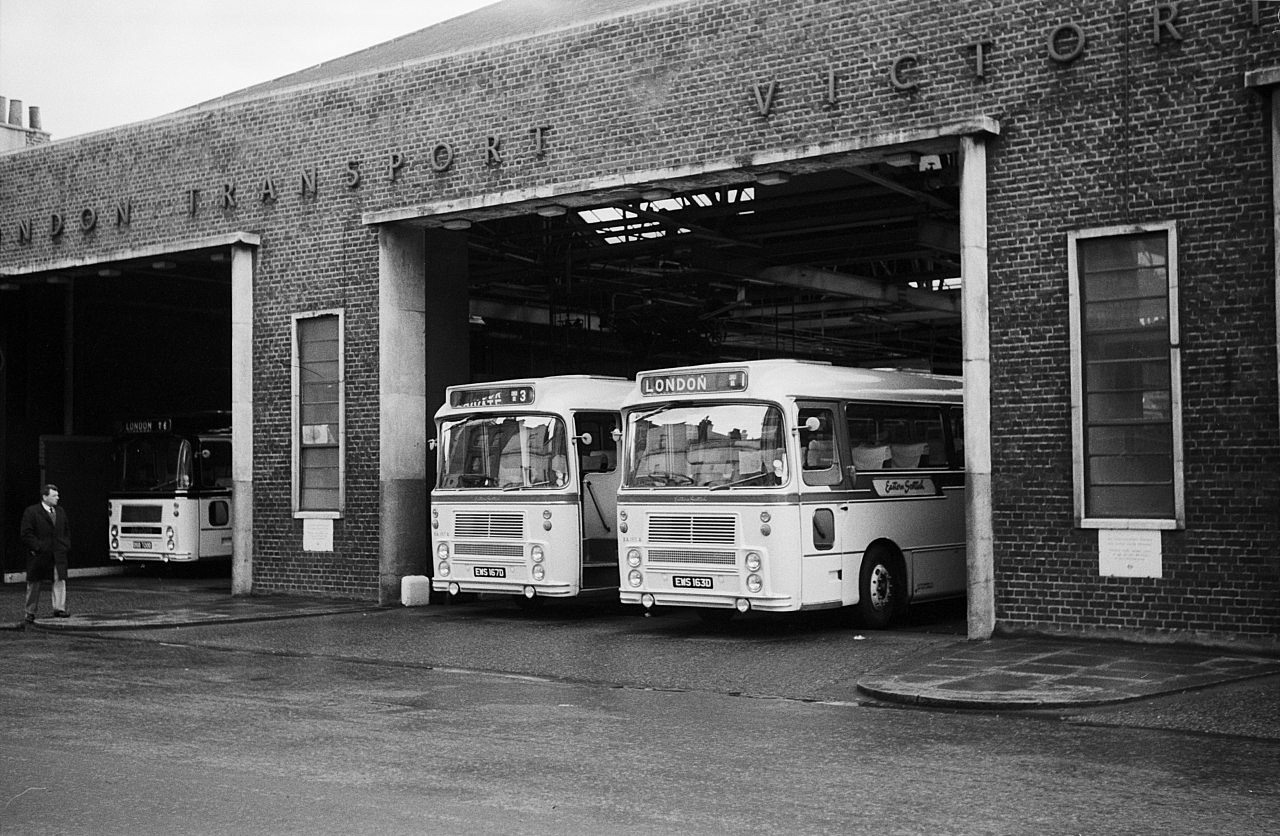
Eastern Scottish express coaches parked at Victoria garage, April 1966

Victoria bus garage, located on Gillingham Street, opened in March 1940. As well as being used for regular bus services by London Transport and successor London General, serving as the only bus garage in central London, Victoria garage was also used by several express coach operators from across the United Kingdom to store their vehicles between services to and from the nearby Victoria Coach Station.

In May 1993, London General announced it was closing Victoria garage due to the financial impact of the loss of routes at the garage. At the time, Victoria garage operated routes 11, 22, 52, 344, N11 and N19 with a fleet of 65 buses, having recently lost tenders for routes 19 and C2. The garage was eventually demolished for redevelopment in 1999.

=== Victoria Basement (VB) ===
The basement level of Victoria bus garage had been long used for storage and parking of single decker buses, but became a separate garage of its own right in 1986 to house the Central London Midibus Unit to operate route C1. It later also operated routes 239, C1, C2 & C3. Along with the main Victoria bus garage upstairs, the garage closed in June 1993; replaced by the new Battersea Base (BB).

=== Waterside Way (PL) ===
Waterside Way garage was located on Waterside Way, Tooting, and opened in 2003 as a base for London General's training and private hire vehicles. The garage also began operating TfL services in January 2007 with routes 39 & 485 moving from Putney Garage. The garage closed on 24 March 2023 when the lease expired; being replaced by a new garage on Goat Road (coded GM) in Mitcham, which was resited in 2025 to be located on Ellis Road.

== See also ==
- List of bus operators of the United Kingdom
