= BL1 =

BL1 could refer to:

- BL1, a postcode district in the BL postcode area
- Biosafety Level 1
- The EMD BL1, predecessor to the EMD BL2 locomotive
- London Buses route BL1, commonly known as the Bakerloop
