= Bakerloo line extension =

Proposed southern extension of the London Underground

- Proposed route, safeguarded by TfL in 2021

Overview
- Status: Proposed
- Locale: London, England
- Stations: 4
- Website: TfL Bakerloo line extension

Service
- Type: Rapid transit
- System: London Underground
- Operator: London Underground Ltd

Technical
- Line length: 7.5 km
- Track gauge: 1,435 mm (4 ft 8 1/2 in) standard gauge

The Bakerloo line extension is a proposed extension of the London Underground's Bakerloo line in south-east London from Elephant & Castle to Lewisham.

An extension southwards from Elephant & Castle was considered as early as 1913, with a formal proposal to extend to Camberwell in the late 1940s. Since the late 2000s, Transport for London (TfL) has been planning an extension of the line, with a route to Lewisham via Old Kent Road safeguarded in 2021. TfL has also proposed taking over services on the Hayes line to Hayes and Beckenham Junction, which could occur following the completion of the extension to Lewisham.

The extension would serve areas of south-east London with low levels of public transport availability, improving accessibility and reducing journey times. The extension would also support regeneration and housing development in the area. Estimated to cost between £4.7 and £7.9 billion (in 2017 prices), the extension would take around seven years to construct. Due to financial impacts of the COVID-19 pandemic, work to implement the extension is currently on hold.

== Background ==
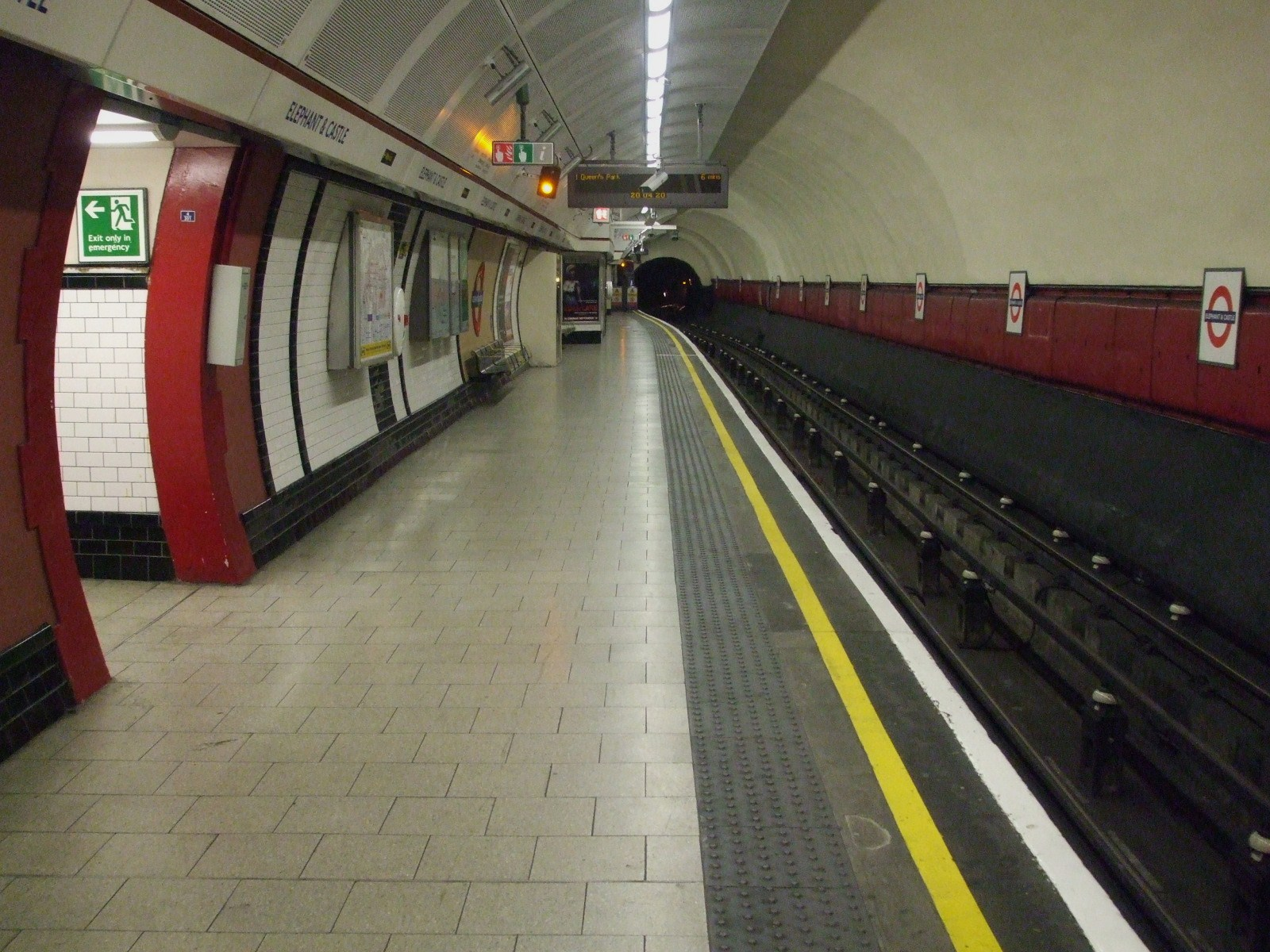
Elephant & Castle, the southern terminus of the Bakerloo line

Most of the London Underground network lies north of the River Thames, public transport in South London generally being provided by lower-frequency National Rail suburban services and London Buses.

A large area of South-east London has no rail or tube links, and low public transport accessibility levels. This includes places such as Camberwell, Walworth, Burgess Park and the Old Kent Road. Existing railway lines through the area – the South Eastern Main Line and the Holborn Viaduct–Herne Hill line – are already very crowded and at full capacity. There are also no intermediate stations on main lines through this area. Furthermore, TfL states that the bus network along the Old Kent Road operates at "close to capacity" with over 60 buses an hour in some sections.

Unlike most Underground lines, the Bakerloo line terminates in Zone 1 of London. The line is underused compared to other Underground lines. In 2017, around 110 million journeys were made on it, less than half of those on the Central, Northern, Jubilee or Victoria lines, and passenger growth levels have been lower than on other lines. TfL believes that the low level of demand on the line is due to its limited connectivity at the southern end, a lower frequency of service compared to other lines (20 trains per hour versus 30+ trains per hour on the Victoria line), and the oldest trains on the Underground network.

== History ==
=== Prior proposals ===
Before the Baker Street and Waterloo Railway (now the Bakerloo line) opened between Baker Street and Elephant & Castle in 1906, several alternative schemes were proposed for extending the line at both ends. One failed scheme, the New Cross & Waterloo Railway Bill of 1898, had proposed the construction of a line as far south as Old Kent Road, but it was not considered by parliament before it was dropped.

The possibility of building a line through Camberwell first emerged in 1913, when the Lord Mayor of London announced a proposal for the Bakerloo Tube to be extended to the Crystal Palace via Camberwell Green, Dulwich and Sydenham Hill. In 1921, the Underground Electric Railways Company of London costed an extension to Camberwell, Dulwich and Sydenham, and in 1922, plans for an extension to Orpington via Loughborough Junction and Catford were considered. No action was taken to move any of these proposals forward. In 1928, a route to Rushey Green via Dulwich was suggested. Again, no action was taken, although the London and Home Counties Traffic Advisory Committee supported the idea of an extension to Camberwell in 1926.

==== 1931 and 1947 extension proposals ====
In 1931, an extension to Camberwell was approved as part of the London Electric Metropolitan District and Central London Railway Companies (Works) Act, 1931. The route was to follow Walworth Road and Camberwell Road south from Elephant & Castle, with stations at Albany Road and under Denmark Hill at Camberwell. Elephant & Castle was also to be reconstructed with a third platform to provide the additional turn-round capacity, a new ticket hall and escalators. The need to prioritise the extension from Baker Street to Finchley Road to provide relief for the Metropolitan line, financial constraints and the outbreak of the Second World War prevented any work from starting.

The 1931 enabling powers were renewed by the Government in 1947 under the Special Enactments (Extension of Time) Act, 1940, and the projected extension as far as Camberwell even appeared on a 1949 edition of the Underground map, but no further work was done. Train indication signs showing Camberwell as a destination were created in anticipation of the southern extension and erected in some Tube stations; these signs were still visible at Warwick Avenue until the 1990s. Also, the order for 1949 Stock – built to augment the 1938 stock fleet – included sufficient cars to provide extra trains for the Camberwell extension.

Eventually the proposal faded away. Extensions and new stations were not in favour post-war, as road use increased massively. However, the problem of inadequate turn-round capacity at Elephant & Castle remained. The plan was briefly revived in the 1950s with the intermediate station now to be at Walworth and the terminus under Camberwell Green. Elephant & Castle would not be altered and the additional turn-round capacity would be provided by making Camberwell a three-platform terminus.

The original intention to extend to Camberwell was driven by the wish to serve the area, but in the later scheme operational issues were a major consideration. By the time the Bakerloo line branches to Watford Junction and Stanmore had opened, the line was running at full capacity, limited by the need to terminate trains at Elephant & Castle. By extending to Camberwell, where there would be three platforms, the whole line would have benefited from an improved frequency. However, "stepping back" made the best use of the terminal capacity at Elephant & Castle, and this weakened the case for an extension from Elephant & Castle.

By 1950, post-war austerity, the levelling-off of demand, and above all the disproportionately high cost of the project with a three-platform deep-level terminus and the need to purchase 14 further trains and build a new depot for them, meant that the project became unaffordable and it was cancelled. Demand on the Bakerloo line was relieved following construction of the Jubilee line in the 1970s, as the Stanmore branch now solely served the new Jubilee line.

==== 1970s and 1980s extension proposals ====
In the 1970s, the Greater London Council considered extending the line to Peckham Rye, however this proposal was not taken forward due to high costs, low ridership projections and subsequent poor value for money.

In the late 1980s, following overcrowding in Central London and proposed growth in Docklands, the Central London Rail Study (a joint report of Network SouthEast, London Underground, London Regional Transport and the Department for Transport) was commissioned. Within the report, two extensions of the Bakerloo line were considered – an extension to Lewisham along the Old Kent Road, and an extension to Canary Wharf and Docklands. Neither proposal was taken forward. Subsequently, the Jubilee line was extended to serve Canary Wharf and the Docklands as part of the Jubilee Line Extension, which opened in 1999.

==== 2000s ====
In the early 2000s, Transport for London (TfL) under Mayor Ken Livingstone proposed the Cross River Tram, a new light rail system running south from Kings Cross, Camden and Euston through Central London to Waterloo, with two branches serving Brixton and Peckham. The line would serve areas such as Walworth or Peckham not served by Underground or National Rail stations, provide fully accessible journeys thanks to low floor trams, and provide faster journeys than existing bus services. Consultation on the proposed tram took place in 2006–7, with the tram line proposed to open in 2016 at a cost of around £1.3bn.

Throughout the early 2000s, no Bakerloo line extensions were being considered by TfL, as the Public Private Partnership (PPP) to upgrade the Underground did not include provision for line extensions within the PPP contracts. However, it was noted that there could be demand for a Bakerloo line extension in future decades. Following the election of Mayor Boris Johnson, the Cross River Tram was cancelled in 2008 due to lack of funding.

In November 2006, TfL published a transport strategic report for London, Transport 2025: transport challenges for a growing city. The report considered a variety of long-term transport improvements in London, with a Bakerloo extension considered as the most beneficial option for extending the Tube in South London. It considered three route options for the Bakerloo line; from Elephant & Castle, the proposed routes were either south to Camberwell and Streatham, or east to Beckenham and Hayes:

Option 1: via Burgess Park, east to Peckham Rye and Catford Bridge, with the option of taking over the Hayes Line to terminate at Hayes

Option 2: south to Camberwell Green, and then on to Herne Hill and Streatham Hill, with a branch at Tulse Hill which would take over the National Rail line to Beckenham Junction

Option 3: a similar route to option 1, but after Burgess Park running via the Old Kent Road and New Cross before joining the Hayes line at Lewisham and terminating at Hayes.

Alternative proposed routes for the southern extension of the Bakerloo line
Option 1

Option 2

Option 3

A subsequent feasibility report into an extension of the Bakerloo line from Elephant & Castle was commissioned by TfL in 2007, with potential routes south to Camberwell and Streatham, or east to Beckenham and Hayes. However, the Mayor stated that the immediate focus of TfL was on renewing and upgrading existing lines, and that further work on an extension of the line would not begin until the mid 2010s in the subsequent Business Plan.

=== Current project ===
==== 2010s ====
In May 2010, Mayor Boris Johnson published the Mayor's Transport Strategy (MTS), which outlined the Mayor's plans for public transport in the capital. The MTS specifically supported a southern extension of the Bakerloo line, noting that it would utilise spare Bakerloo line capacity, serve areas with low transport connectivity, and relieve congested National Rail lines into central London. The proposal was noted, however, to be a long-term project, requiring further study by TfL.

A consultant's report for Lewisham Council in 2010 analysed the costs and benefits of a variety of different routes for a Bakerloo extension, with costs between £1.6bn and £3.6bn, depending on the destination and the route option chosen. The report also stated that the Northern line extension to Battersea and the Piccadilly line upgrade were "ahead in the investment queue", and therefore work was unlikely to begin until the 2020s. TfL's view was that "A key advantage of the Hayes option is that [it] releases train paths into London Bridge".

In July 2011, Network Rail published a long-term planning document for London and the South East – the Route Utilisation Strategy (RUS). This recommended an extension of the Bakerloo line from Elephant & Castle to Lewisham, where it would take over the line to Hayes and thus release capacity on National Rail lines into Charing Cross. In January 2012, Network Rail published a summary of its London & South East RUS recommendations, which stated that further feasibility work on an extension was required. In March 2012, Lewisham Council's consultant on the Bakerloo extension advised: "There is a good to strong, but not overwhelming case for a Bakerloo extension", explaining many other rail projects in the London area were competing for funding – including Crossrail 2 and Tube upgrades.

In early 2013, Mayor Johnson confirmed that detailed feasibility work into the extension by TfL was underway, and that Southwark Council was working out the level of development required to justify the economic case for the extension. In early 2014, Mayor Johnson stated that the Old Kent Road would be designated as an Opportunity Area, causing concern that this could cause TfL to prefer a route via Old Kent Road rather than Camberwell. In July 2014, the London Infrastructure Plan 2050 further supported the Bakerloo line extension as a long term transport project for London.

===== 2014: Initial route consultation =====
In September 2014, TfL launched an initial public consultation into the Bakerloo line extension. The proposal included a new tunnel from Elephant & Castle to Lewisham, before a further extension using existing rail lines south of Lewisham to Beckenham Junction and Hayes. The cost of the extension would be in the region of £2–3bn and construction was proposed to start in the mid 2020s, with a completion date of the early to mid 2030s. As part of the consultation, feedback was sought on various route options:

- Option 1a: a direct south-east route via the Old Kent Road, with 2 stations or
- Option 1b: a southern route, via Camberwell and Peckham Rye stations
- Option 2: Extending the line further east from Beckenham Junction to Bromley.

The consultation was met with wide support from the public, London Assembly members, local MPs, and local boroughs such as Southwark, Lewisham and Greenwich publicly supporting the proposal. However, Bromley Council called the extension "unacceptable", due to the potential loss of fast trains to London Bridge. Subsequently, some Lewisham councillors accused their counterparts in Bromley of being against the extension. Other boroughs lobbied for alternative routes: Croydon Council suggested in July 2015 that the extension should go to Croydon instead of Bromley.

Following the consultation, TfL analysed the various responses received, and assessed various routes options suggested. Destinations of routes assessed included Streatham, Crystal Palace, Croydon, Orpington & Bromley, Woolwich Arsenal via Deptford, as well as the original proposed route to Hayes & Beckenham Junction.

In December 2015, TfL published the results of the consultation, noting that it had received over 15,000 responses, of which 96 per cent were in favour of an extension. It concluded that an extension towards Lewisham via the Old Kent Road was favoured, as it had the potential of 25,000 new homes along the route – as well as a construction cost £480 million less than Option 1b (via Camberwell and Peckham Rye). An extension to Lewisham would be built as a first phase, as it would be easier, cheaper and less disruptive to build. A further extension to Hayes and Beckenham or Bromley would now be considered in a separate phase in the more distant future. Campaigners in Camberwell were "very disappointed" by the preferred route announcement, noting that they would push for the construction of a Camberwell railway station instead. In Southwark, campaigners welcomed the news, suggesting they would push for both the Camberwell and Old Kent Road branches to be built. TfL stated that it would now begin detailed technical work on the extension, with a further consultation to follow in 2016.

Following the election of Sadiq Khan as Mayor of London in 2016, detailed technical and feasibility work on the extension continued, with the TfL Business Plan noting the completion date of the extension could be brought forward to 2028/9.

===== 2017: Station options consultation =====
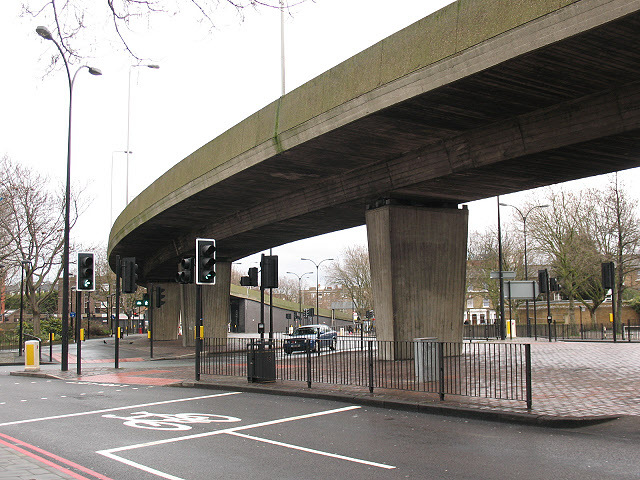
TfL initially proposed a ventilation shaft at Bricklayers Arms

In February 2017, TfL opened a detailed consultation to examine potential sites for stations and ventilation shafts along the proposed route to Lewisham. The consultation proposed two new stations on the Old Kent Road (each with two location options), and interchange stations at New Cross Gate and Lewisham. The consultation also stated that expansion and improvement work would be required at the existing Elephant & Castle station, to provide better connections to the Northern line and National Rail services. Local campaigners broadly welcomed the consultation, with criticism of the proposed ventilation shafts at Faraday Gardens (a local park) and Bricklayers Arms, where an additional station was requested. Sainsbury's criticised the proposed location of the New Cross Gate station, stating it preferred another location for the station, so that it could build 1,500 homes and a new supermarket on the New Cross Gate Retail Park instead.

In July 2017, the initial response to the consultation was published by TfL, noting that over 4,800 responses had been received. Further work to analyse the responses, and detailed technical & feasibility work would continue.

In March 2018, the Royal Borough of Greenwich and the Canary Wharf Group announced that they had an alternative extension proposal via Surrey Quays, Canary Wharf, North Greenwich and Charlton Riverside, crossing the River Thames twice. This extension would serve development sites along the route, as well as relieving the overcrowded Jubilee line between Canary Wharf and Canada Water. The alternative proposal was criticised by Back the Bakerloo – a cross-party campaign group of businesses, developers and local councils set up by Southwark and Lewisham Council to push for the extension.

In September 2018, TfL published its detailed responses to issues raised in the 2017 consultation. As well as confirming proposed locations at the two Old Kent Road stations, the report proposed a new integrated ticket hall at Elephant & Castle underneath the new shopping centre, and a more direct route reducing the need for ventilation shafts. This would rule out a station at Bricklayers Arms. An additional station was also estimated to cost around £200 million, whereas the more direct route reduced the costs by around £100 million – as well as reducing journey times. Further technical work would take place before a final detailed consultation in 2019, prior to permission to build the extension being sought. The confirmation of the extension was welcomed by local councils and campaigners, but some residents were disappointed by the lack of a proposed station at Bricklayers Arms.

===== 2019: Detailed consultation =====
In October 2019, TfL announced a further consultation, seeking views on the finalised extension proposal. As well as seeking name suggestions for the two Old Kent Road stations, the consultation included:

- details on new Bakerloo line platforms and an integrated station entrance at Elephant & Castle tube station, to be built as part of the new shopping centre development.
- proposed alignment of the tunnels from Lambeth North to Lewisham.
- location of tunnelling worksites to build the extension – with a primary work site proposed at New Cross Gate.
- details regarding a further extension beyond Lewisham in future to Hayes and Beckenham Junction.

As with previous consultations, local campaign groups, developers and several local councils supported the extension, with Back the Bakerloo urging Prime Minister Boris Johnson to support the extension and contribute to its construction cost. TfL had warned that only 9,000 of 25,000 homes could be built on the Old Kent Road if the extension was not built.

Bromley Council welcomed the confirmation of the extension to Lewisham, but claimed that an extension to Hayes had been "resoundingly rejected" in 2014, and that it would challenge the proposed extension in its response. It added that it would prefer investment to serve Bromley town centre and that Bromley residents preferred fast trains to London Bridge rather than the Underground. Opposition councillors criticised this as ignoring the opinions of local residents, stating that 68% of Bromley residents supported the extension to Hayes in the 2014 TfL consultation.

In September 2019, Sainsbury's and Mount Anvil had submitted a planning application to build 1,161 homes and a new supermarket on the site of the current New Cross Gate Retail Park. The October 2019 TfL consultation explained that the site was required for construction of the extension, and that other suggested worksite locations were too small or would damage the environment. After negative feedback from the local community, campaign groups and TfL, Sainsbury's and Mount Anvil subsequently withdrew their application in February 2020, stating that the extension had "blighted the site", making their development unfeasible.

==== 2020s ====
In January 2020, Southwark Council and TfL both agreed to contribute £7.5 million each towards the construction of a new ticket hall at Elephant & Castle, as part of the redevelopment of the shopping centre. This new ticket hall – to be built by developer Delancey – would serve both the Northern line and the future Bakerloo line platforms, bringing escalators and step-free access to the station. It would also reduce the need to take land to build the station, saving on future construction. The ticket hall will open in 2028/9.

It was reported that TfL was considering a land value capture tax on developers along the route to pay for the extension. This was previously used to fund part of the Crossrail project, raising £4.1bn.

In November 2020, TfL released the report of the 2019 consultation. Over 8,700 responses had been received, with 89% support. A further 20,600 identical positive responses were received via the Back the Bakerloo campaign. There was also strong support (82%) for a possible further extension to Hayes and Beckenham Junction. TfL also confirmed the names for the two Old Kent Road stations – Burgess Park and Old Kent Road. TfL stated that the next step was safeguarding the route, and applying for permission to build the extension via a Transport and Works Act Order, subject to funding being available.

===== 2021–2025: Route safeguarded, project on hold =====
In 2021, the route from Elephant & Castle to Lewisham was safeguarded by the Department for Transport, protecting land above and below ground for future construction of the extension. This was welcomed by Mayor Sadiq Khan, TfL and local councils.

Due to the financial situations resulting from the COVID-19 pandemic, work to implement the extension was put on hold, with TfL's Comprehensive Spending Review submission stating "we are being realistic about what is affordable over the next decade". In March 2021, TfL's finance chief stated that the extension would not be seen in the next decade.

In April 2021, Southwark Council agreed to consider whether a tram down the Old Kent Road to serve development sites along the corridor might be an alternative if the Bakerloo Line extension did not proceed, as this could be delivered faster and cheaper than the Bakerloo line extension. The council is limited to around 9,500 homes on the corridor if the extension is not built.

In October 2024, contracts were awarded for feasibility studies, with the four new stations expected to open by 2040. In 2025, property developers along the Old Kent Road stated that the government’s spending review had “killed” the project by not providing funding for the project.

===== 2026: New funding methods =====
On 28 October 2026, the 2026 UK Budget provided the mayor of London, Sadiq Khan, greater funding powers by retaining 20% of business rates, a land value capture tax on developers along the route to pay for the extension and have greater freedom to borrow against future revenues from 2027. This means mayors will be able to use the new funding streams to fund infrastructure projects which includes the Bakerloo line extension.

== Proposed route ==
The proposed extension of the Bakerloo line comprises 7.5 km (4.7 miles) of twin tunnels, with four new stations (Burgess Park, Old Kent Road, New Cross Gate and Lewisham), one ventilation shaft and a depot at Wearside Road, Lewisham. All stations would be fully accessible. The extension is estimated to cost between £4.7bn and £7.9bn (in 2017 prices), and would take around seven years to construct. The route was safeguarded by the Department for Transport in 2021, protecting the alignment from development.

=== Elephant & Castle to Lewisham ===
The route of the extension would begin between Lambeth North and Elephant & Castle, as a branch off the existing Bakerloo line tunnels. The new tunnels would allow for a faster and more direct route, as the end of the existing Bakerloo line tunnels point south towards Camberwell. Consequently, new platforms would have been built at Elephant & Castle, underneath the Shopping Centre. The tunnels would then continue south east, generally following the Old Kent Road. Burgess Park station would be located on the site of the Old Kent Road Tesco, adjacent to Burgess Park. During construction, the site would be used to launch tunnel boring machines (TBMs) to dig the running tunnels towards Lambeth North. The line would then continue south-east underneath the Old Kent Road. Old Kent Road station would be located on the site of an existing Lidl supermarket, adjacent to Asylum Road. The line would continue south-east, along the Old Kent Road and New Cross Road. New Cross Gate station would be located on the New Cross Gate Retail Park (Sainsbury's), just west of the existing station. This site would be the main construction work site of the extension, launching TBMs east and west as well as taking away the tunnelling spoil by rail, reducing the need for lorry journeys. The tunnels would continue south-east, passing beneath Goldsmiths' College. A ventilation shaft would be located between New Cross Gate and Lewisham at Alexandra Cottages. The shaft would provide ventilation for the tunnels, as well as emergency access in the unlikely event of fire/other incidents. Lewisham station would be located south-west of the existing railway and DLR station, on the site of the current bus station. The route would then turn south towards Wearside Road, the site of a Lewisham Council maintenance depot. Wearside Road would be used to help build the extension, as well as store and turn around trains when the extension is operational. It would also permit access to the Hayes line for a future extension to Hayes and Beckenham Junction.

Proposed station	London Borough	Proposed location	Coordinates	Proposed Infrastructure	Notes
Elephant & Castle	Southwark	Underneath the Michael Faraday Memorial and the shopping centre redevelopment	51°29′39.84″N 0°5′58.92″W	New platforms and running tunnels to be built, connected to new ticket hall built as part of the shopping centre redevelopment	Connects to Northern line and National Rail services
Burgess Park	Southwark	Site of Old Kent Road Tesco superstore, Old Kent Road and Humphrey Street	51°29′19.51″N 0°4′36.12″W	New station with deep-level platforms	
Old Kent Road	Southwark	Site of Lidl supermarket, at Old Kent Road and Asylum Road	51°28′48.44″N 0°3′32.33″W	New station with deep-level platforms	
New Cross Gate	Lewisham	Site of the New Cross Retail Park (Sainsbury's)	51°28′31.8″N 0°2′24.72″W	New ticket hall and new deep-level platforms	Would connect to London Overground and National Rail services
Lewisham	Lewisham	Located at the existing Lewisham bus stands on Thurston Road	51°27′56.47″N 0°0′53.71″W	New ticket hall and new deep-level platforms, new bus stand	Would connect to Docklands Light Railway and National Rail services

=== Future extension to Hayes and Beckenham Junction ===
Following completion of the Lewisham extension, TfL proposes extending the service over the existing National Rail line to Hayes and Beckenham Junction, adding an additional ten stations to the line. The line would have to be converted for the Bakerloo line, with TfL stating that all stations along the line would be made step-free from street to train.

=== Interim bus service ===
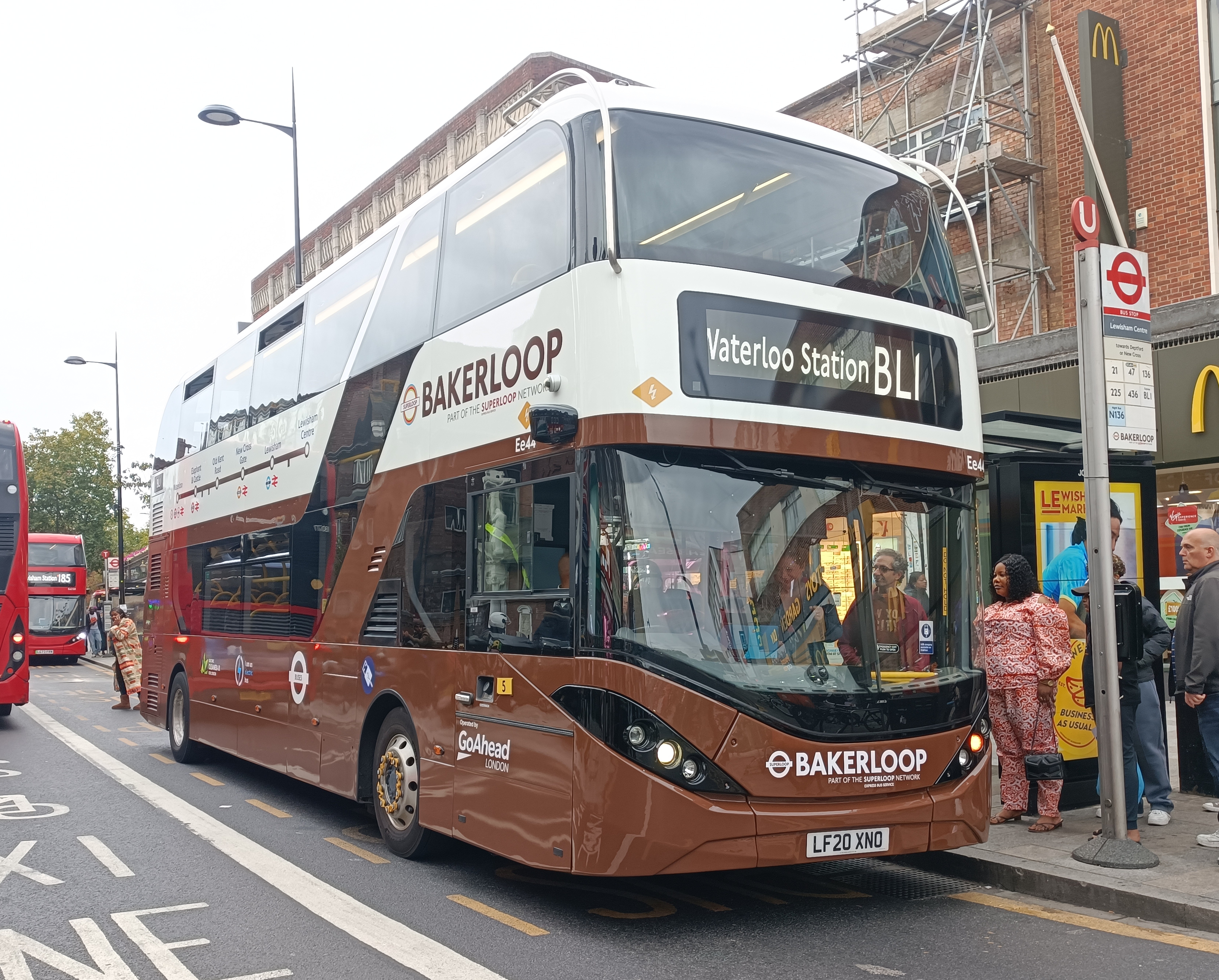
Superloop route BL1, branded as 'Bakerloop', was introduced on 27 September 2025 as a 'bus version' of the extension

A Superloop route, "BL1" was introduced on 27 September 2025, to provide a service until the Bakerloo line extension is completed. The BL1 Bakerloop service runs seven days a week in the daytime and evenings. The bus was free to use during its first week in operation, after which normal TfL bus fares became applicable.

== Expected benefits ==
TfL, local councils and campaign groups have outlined a wide range of benefits of the extension including:

- Providing access to high quality rapid transit to areas of south east London with poor transport accessibility
- Support the regeneration of the area, with Southwark and Lewisham Council estimating that around 25,000 new homes could be built along the corridor
- Relieving congestion and reducing poor air quality on main roads such as the A2 (Old Kent Road) and A20 (Lewisham Way)
- Reducing journey times from Lewisham to Central London by 9 minutes
- More frequent trains than existing London Overground or National Rail services
- Reducing overcrowding on local bus services, as well as on the Jubilee line, DLR, London Overground East London line and National Rail services into London Bridge
- Increase the number of step-free Underground stations, making it easier for all to travel

TfL is also planning to replace the current 1970s rolling stock on the line with the New Tube for London in the late 2020s, and install new signalling allowing for a faster and more frequent service. This would increase capacity on the line by over 25%, as well as speeding up journey times on the existing line.

As with the Northern line extension to Battersea, TfL proposes to use their property development arm (Places for London) to build on top of station sites when construction of the extension is completed. This would recoup some of the costs of building the extension, as well as providing long term income for TfL.

== Perspectives ==
The line is supported by major political parties, local councils and property developers along the route. Bromley Council are supportive of the extension to Lewisham, but do not support a further extension to Hayes and Beckenham Junction.

Several businesses that would have to relocate if the extension was built do not support the extension. Tesco and Sainsbury's – both of which have supermarkets currently located on proposed station sites – have stated that they support the extension, but do not support the loss of their stores due to construction.

== See also ==
- Baker Street and Waterloo Railway – history of the line extension plans
- Edgware Road Tube schemes – abandoned projects in North London, including a Bakerloo extension to Cricklewood
