= London Buses route BL1 =

London Superloop express bus route

BL1
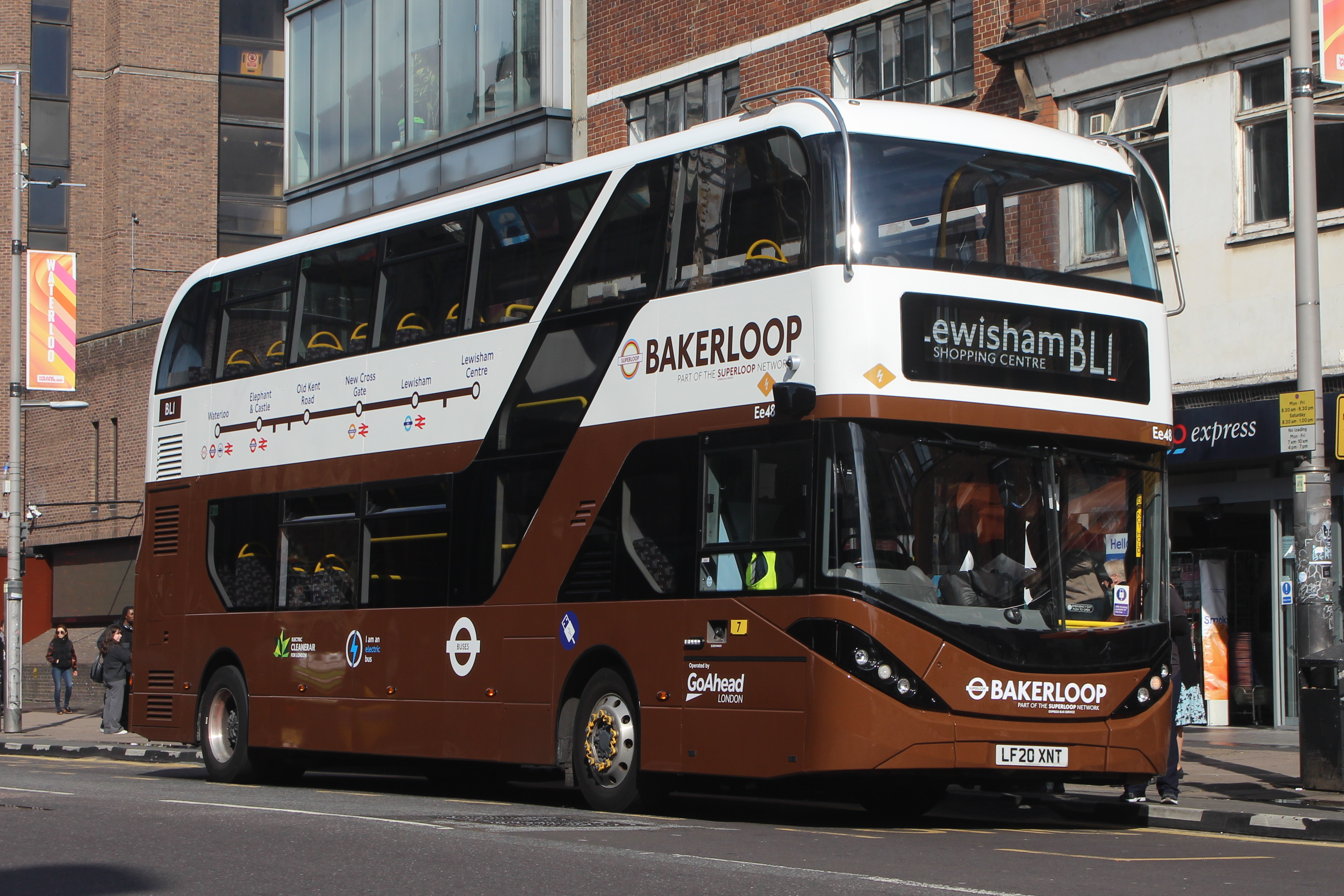
- London General BYD Alexander Dennis Enviro400EV at Waterloo station in September 2025

Overview
- Operator: London General (Go-Ahead London)
- Garage: Waterloo
- Vehicle: BYD Alexander Dennis Enviro400EV
- Peak vehicle requirement: 10
- Began service: 27 September 2025
- Night-time: No night service

Route
- Start: Waterloo station
- Via: Elephant and Castle; Burgess Park; Old Kent Road; New Cross Gate
- End: Lewisham Shopping Centre
- Length: 6 miles (9.7 km)

Service
- Level: Daily
- Frequency: Every 12-15 minutes
- Journey time: 25-43 minutes
- Operates: 05:00 until 00:30

London Buses route BL1, also known as the Bakerloop, is a Transport for London contracted Superloop express bus route in London, England. Running between Waterloo station and Lewisham Shopping Centre, it is operated by Go-Ahead London subsidiary London General.

== History ==
In November 2006, TfL published a transport strategic report for London, Transport 2025: transport challenges for a growing city. The report considered a variety of long-term transport improvements in London, with an extension to the Bakerloo line considered as the most beneficial option for extending the Tube in South London.

During the 2024 London mayoral election, Mayor of London Sadiq Khan proposed an additional 10 Superloop routes across London, including an express bus route via Old Kent Road, prior to construction of the Bakerloo line extension if elected.

Route BL1 began service on 27 September 2025 with free fares for the first week of operation, to incentivise usership.

== Current route ==
Route BL1 operates via these primary locations:

- Waterloo station
- Elephant & Castle station
- Burgess Park
- Old Kent Road
- New Cross Gate station
- Lewisham station
- Lewisham Shopping Centre
