= King's Head, Merton =

Listed house

Coordinates: 51.41661°N 0.18140°W

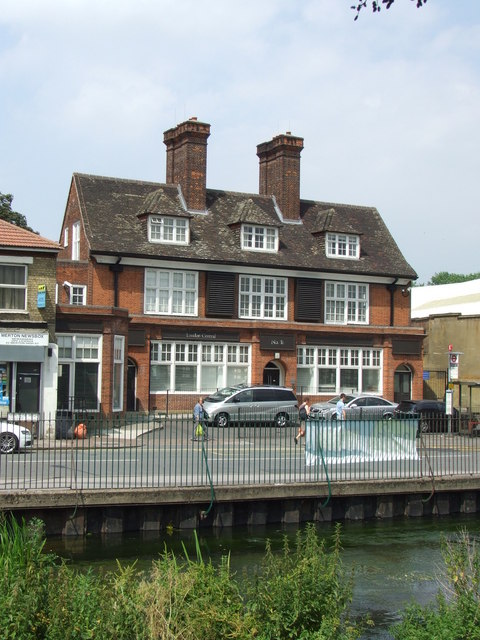
The pub building in 2010

The King's Head was a public house in Merton High Street. An inn existed on the site from the 16th century, and served as a post house in the 17th century. The modern building was constructed in 1933, and is Grade II listed. It closed as a pub in 2004, and later became offices for London General Buses.

== History ==
An inn was known to stand on the area in the year 1594, but the present building was only from 1933. It is, however, listed as a local Grade II building.

In 1684, the daily post service to Epsom was started. The King's Head became the Post House for Merton. Young & Bainbridge purchased the building in 1831 and when the character of Merton changed, seven years later with the arrival of the railway, it became a typical pub. After being rebuilt 1933, was a larger pub, with five bars and many associated activities.

It finally closed as a pub in 2004, and stayed empty for three years. The building was then bought by London General Buses, and the internal structure rebuilt as a headquarter office, keeping the listed exterior in its original appearance.
