= London Buses route 14 =

London bus route

14
- London General Wright Eclipse Gemini 2 bodied Volvo B5LH on Putney Bridge in July 2026

Overview
- Operator: London General (Go-Ahead London)
- Garage: Putney; Waterloo
- Vehicle: Alexander Dennis Enviro400H MMC; Volvo B5LH Wright Eclipse Gemini 2
- Peak vehicle requirement: Day: 28; Night: 8
- Night-time: 24-hour service

Route
- Start: Putney Heath
- Via: Fulham Road; South Kensington; Piccadilly Circus
- End: Russell Square
- Length: 7 miles (11 km)

Service
- Level: Daily

London Buses route 14 is a Transport for London contracted bus route in London, England. Running between Putney Heath and Russell Square, it is operated by Go-Ahead London subsidiary London General.

== History ==
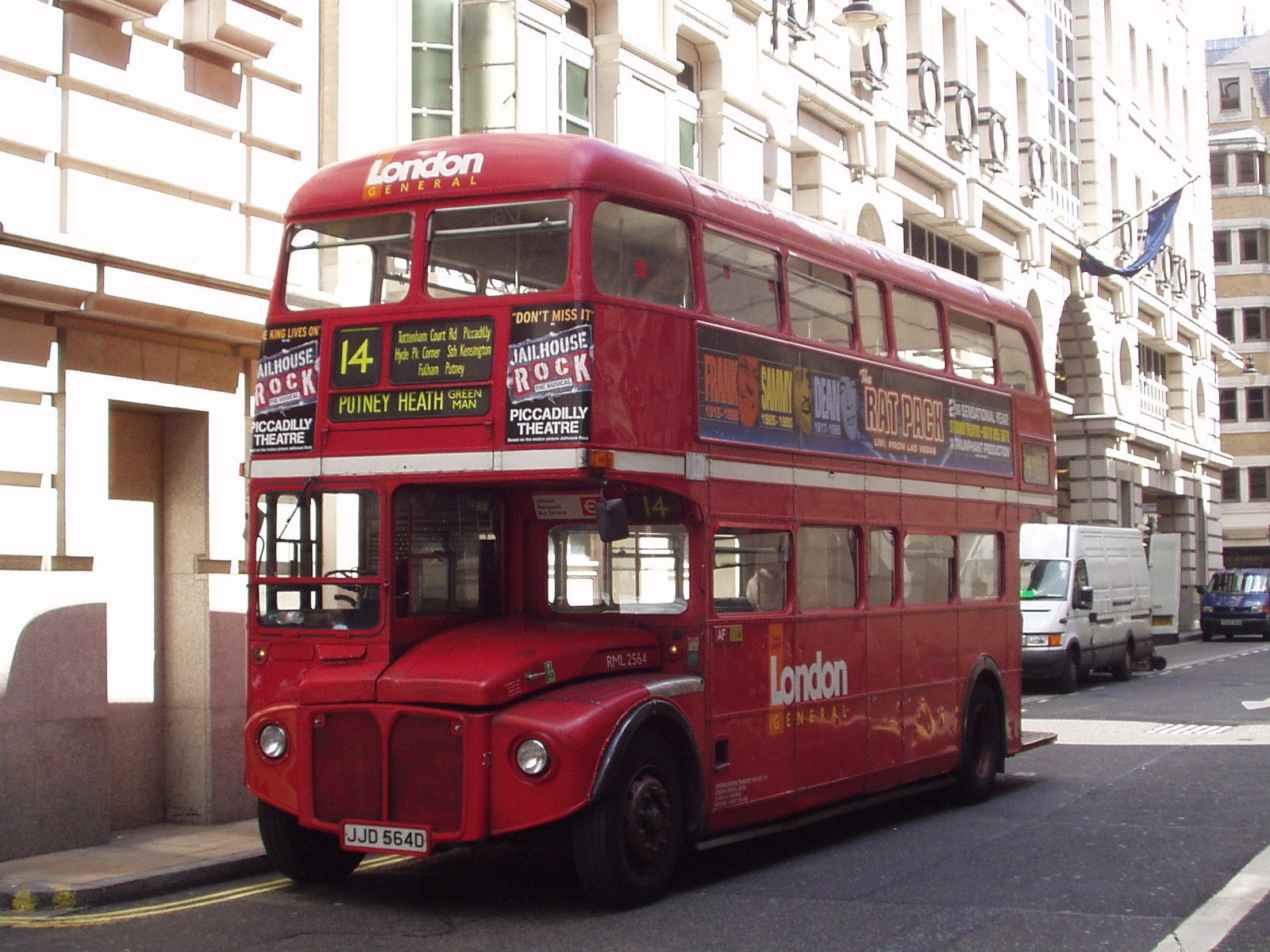
London General AEC Routemaster in Jermyn Street in January 2003

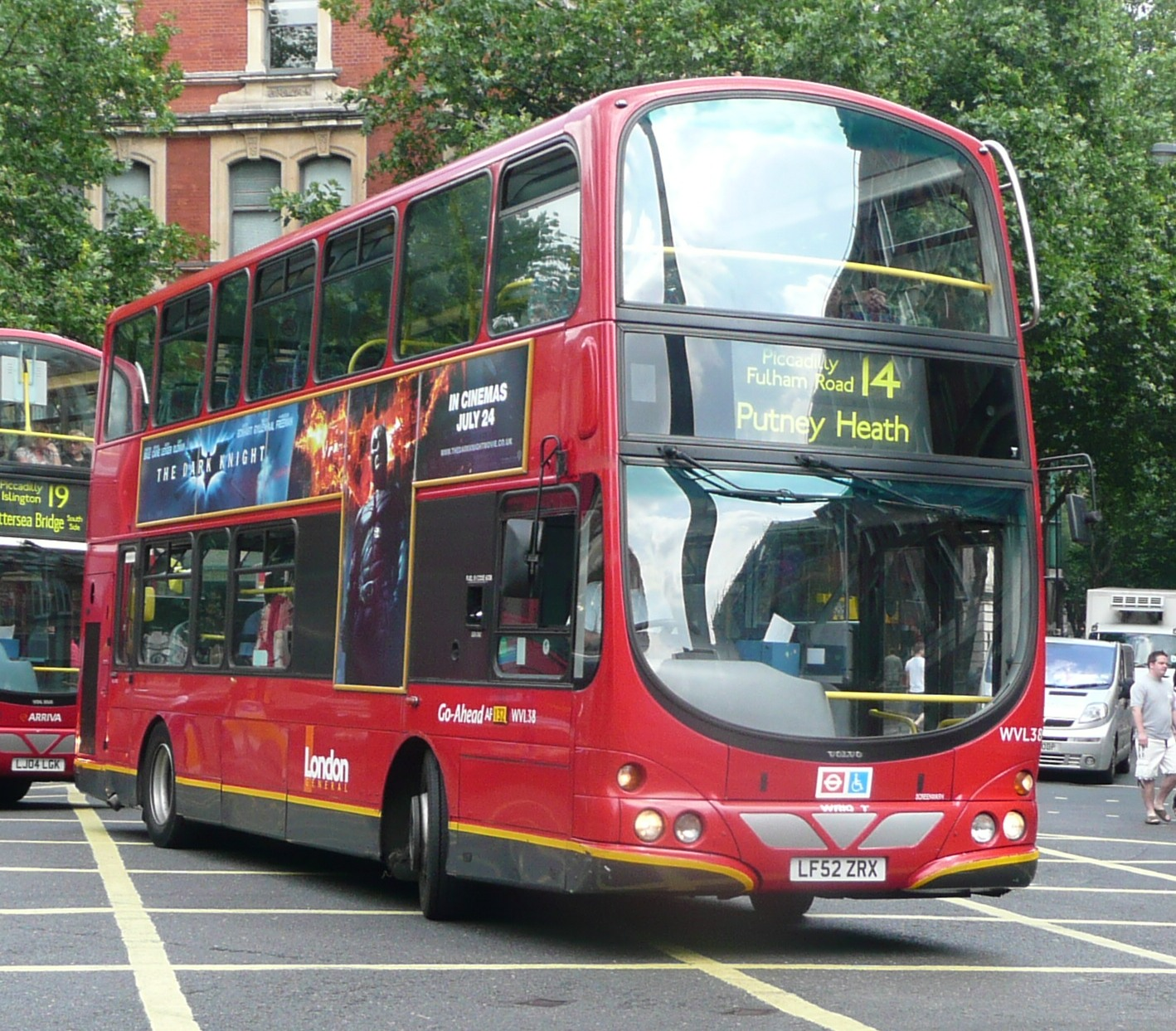
London General Wright Eclipse Gemini bodied Volvo B7TL at the intersection of Tottenham Court Road & Shaftesbury Avenue in July 2008

From 1949 to the late 1980s, route 14 ran from Hornsey Rise to Putney (Monday to Friday) and to Kingston on weekends with a joint allocation between Putney Bridge garage and the original Holloway (Holloway Road) Garage (J) using RT type buses. The route number had previously been used for a service to Putney in the 1920s prior to the formation of the London Passenger Transport Board.

In 1957, the route was used as the basis for a New Scientist magazine study into congestion on London streets. Vehicles on the central section of the route between Euston and Hyde Park Corner were found to spend 68% of their time in motion, and only 11% on loading and unloading passengers.

The late 1980s saw revisions to the Northern end of the route. On 7 February 1987, the main route was cut back to run between Putney Heath Green Man and Euston (or Tottenham Court Road station Monday to Saturday evenings). The Sunday services consisted of a morning extension to Hornsey Rise, and a further extension to Turnpike Lane station, via Crouch End, on Sunday afternoons, with meal relief journeys running to Wood Green Garage. The withdrawn Euston to Hornsey Rise section was replaced by a new route 14A (now route 91). On 26 September the off peak Monday to Friday service was withdrawn between Tottenham Court Road and Euston. The Sunday afternoon service was withdrawn between Crouch End and Turnpike Lane on 26 March 1988.

Upon being re-tendered, London General commenced a new five-year contract from 23 November 2002. Midway through, on 23 July 2005, the AEC Routemasters were replaced by Volvo B7TL Wright Eclipse Gemini buses and on 13 January 2007, it was extended from Tottenham Court Road to Warren Street. London General commenced more contracts on 14 November 2009 and 19 November 2016; each of them is a 7-year contract.

On 15 June 2019, the route was withdrawn between Tottenham Court Road station and Warren Street and rerouted to Russell Square.

== Current route ==
Route 14 operates via these primary locations:

- Putney Heath
- Putney station
- Putney Exchange
- Putney Bridge station
- Fulham High Street
- Fulham Broadway station
- Chelsea and Westminster Hospital
- Royal Brompton Hospital
- South Kensington station
- Knightsbridge station
- Hyde Park Corner station
- Green Park station
- Piccadilly Circus
- Russell Square
