= Chronicle Tower =

Coordinates: 51.5300°N 0.0970°W

Chronicle Tower (Lexicon Tower)
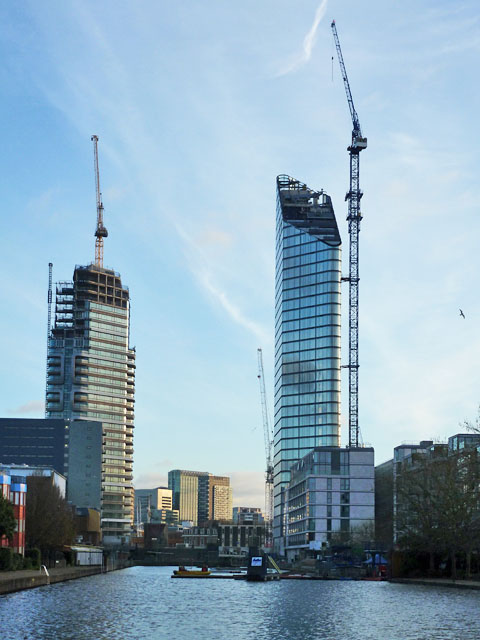

General information
- Status: Completed
- Location: London, EC1; United Kingdom
- Completed: May 2016

Height
- Roof: 115 m (377 ft)

Technical details
- Floor count: 36

Design and construction
- Architect(s): Skidmore Owings & Merrill
- Developer: Mount Anvil

Website
- [www.mountanvil.com/our-london-homes/lexicon/]

The Chronicle Tower (aka Lexicon Tower) is a 36-storey 115m tall residential building in City Road, London, on the west side of the City Road Basin, part of the Regent's Canal. The closest underground station is Angel.

The building includes 146 apartments and is close to the "Square Mile" (London financial city) and "Silicon Roundabout".

The architects were Skidmore Owings & Merrill.

== Gallery ==
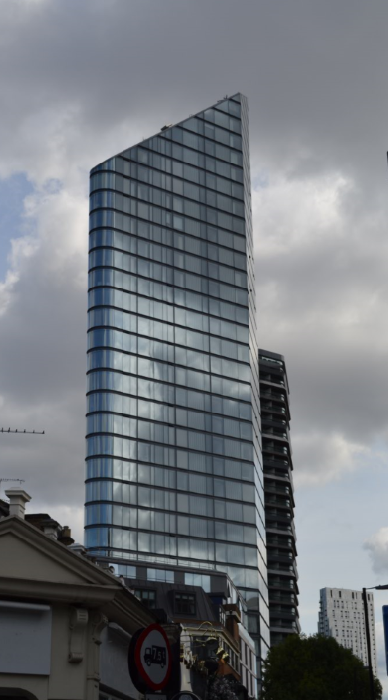
September 2020

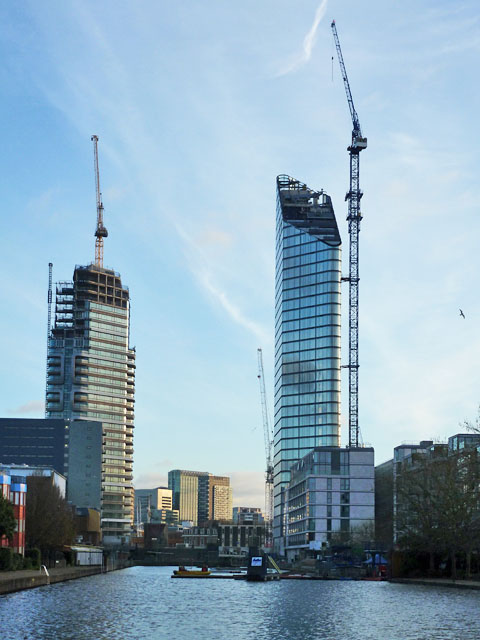
November 2015
