= London Buses route 74 =

London bus route

74
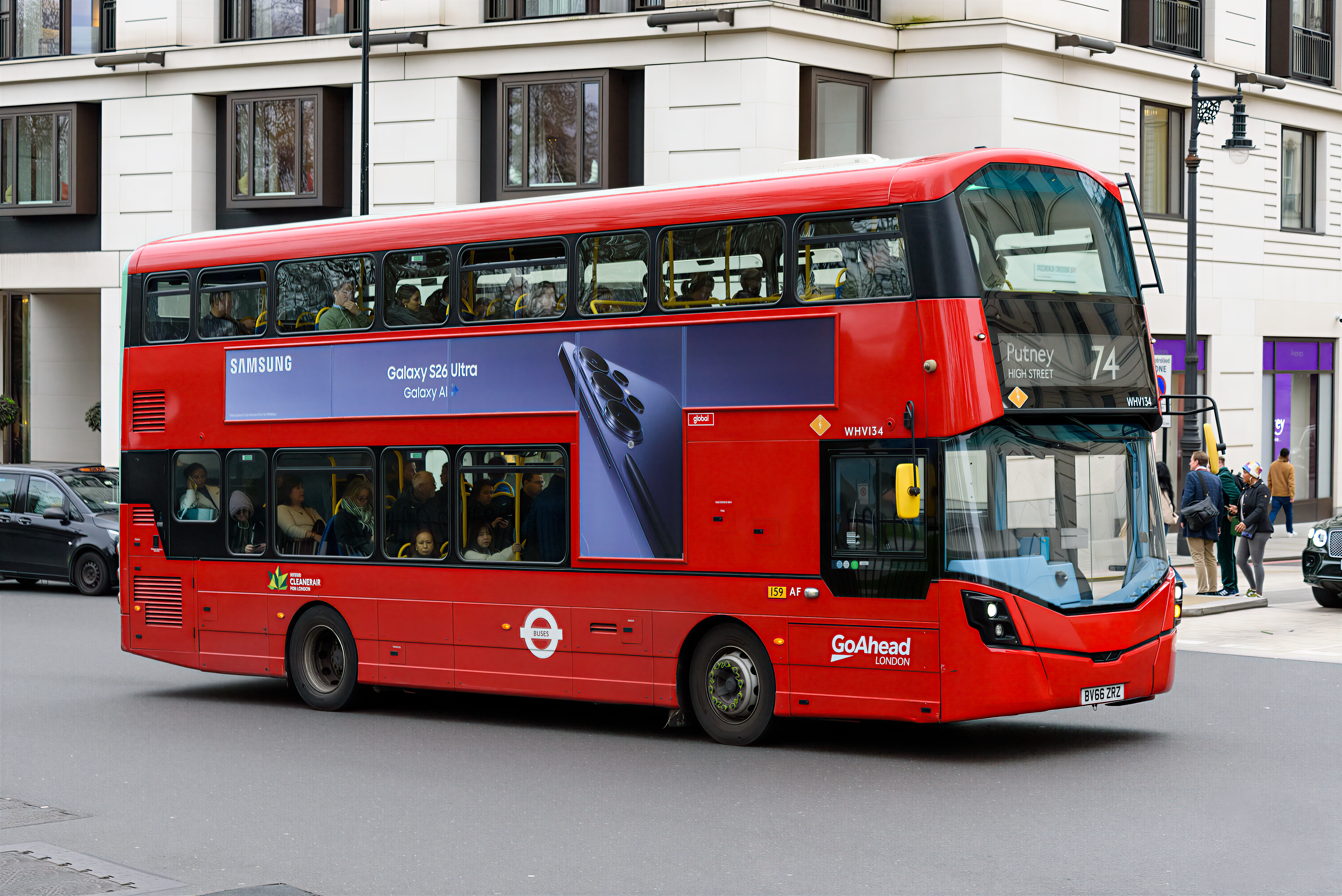
- London General Wright Gemini 3 bodied Volvo B5LH at Hyde Park Corner in March 2026

Overview
- Operator: London General (Go-Ahead London)
- Garage: Putney
- Vehicle: Volvo B5LH Wright Gemini 3
- Peak vehicle requirement: 18
- Night-time: Night Bus N74

Route
- Start: Baker Street station
- Via: Portman Square; Marble Arch; South Kensington; Gloucester Road; Earl's Court; Putney Bridge
- End: Putney Exchange
- Length: 7 miles (11 km)

Service
- Level: Daily
- Frequency: About every 8-10 minutes
- Journey time: 37-71 minutes
- Operates: 05:15 until 01:30
- Annual patronage: 4.38 million (2024/25)

London Buses route 74 is a Transport for London contracted bus route in London, England. Running between Baker Street station and Putney Exchange, it is operated by Go-Ahead London subsidiary London General.

== Proposed withdrawal ==
In June 2022, TfL launched a consultation on a range of bus cuts which included the proposed merger of route 74 and 430, but it would be shortened to South Kensington to reduce duplication with services 2 and 13. With the merger, the affected portion from West Brompton, via Warwick Road, Creswell Gardens and Onslow Gardens would no longer run. On 23 November 2022, it was announced that these changes would not be going ahead.

== Ridership ==
The route carried 4.38 million passengers in the 2024/25 year.

== Current route ==
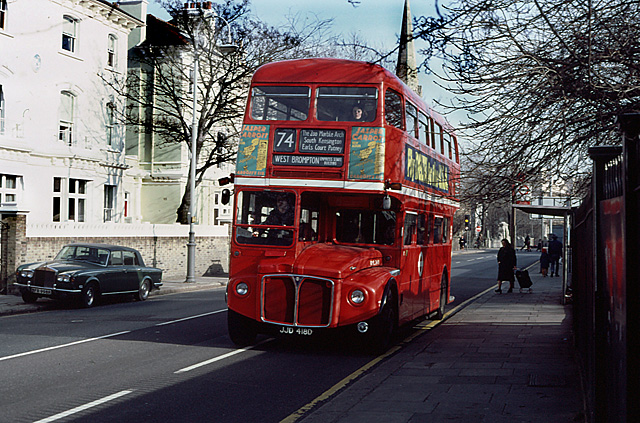
AEC Routemaster in Primrose Hill in February 1983

Route 74 operates via these primary locations:

- Putney Exchange
- Putney Bridge station
- Fulham High Street
- Charing Cross Hospital
- West Brompton station
- Earl's Court station
- Gloucester Road station
- South Kensington station
- Knightsbridge station
- Hyde Park Corner station
- Marble Arch station
- Baker Street station
