= Mount Anvil =

British property development company

Mount Anvil is a London-based property developer, established in 1991.

Killian Hurley is the co-founder and CEO.

London projects include the redevelopment of Riverside Studios in Hammersmith, The Landau in Fulham, and the 36-storey 116m Lexicon Tower in Islington.
