= Elephant & Castle tube station =

London Underground station

Elephant & Castle
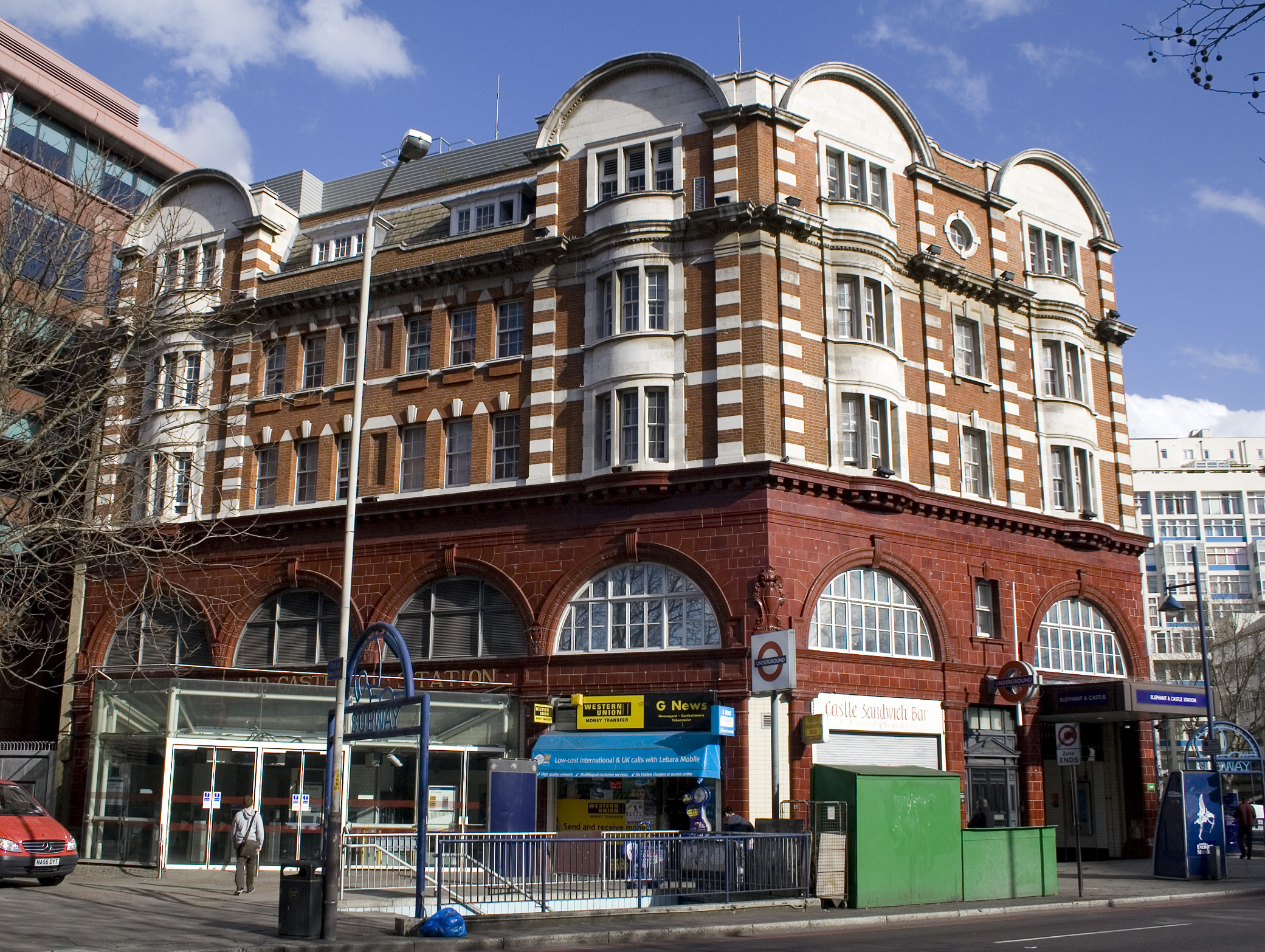
- The Bakerloo line entrance, showing its design features with shops and the entrance to the far right
- Interactive map of Elephant & Castle

General information
- Location: Elephant and Castle, Newington
- Local authority: London Borough of Southwark
- Managed by: London Underground
- Owner: London Underground
- Number of platforms: 4
- Accessible: Yes (Northern line southbound only)
- Fare zone: 1 and 2
- OSI: Elephant & Castle

London Underground annual entry and exit
- 2021: ▼7.88 million
- 2022: ▲13.30 million
- 2023: ▲14.24 million
- 2024: ▼13.54 million
- 2025: ▼12.99 million

Key dates
- 18 December 1890: Opened (C&SLR)
- 5 August 1906: Opened (BS&WR)

Other information
- External links: TfL station info page
- Coordinates: 51.4944°N 0.0997°W

Elephant & Castle is a London Underground station in the London Borough of Southwark in Central London. It is on the Bank branch of the Northern line, between Borough and Kennington stations. It is also the southern terminus of the Bakerloo line and the next station towards the north is Lambeth North. The station is in both London fare zone 1 and zone 2. The Northern line station was opened in 1890 by the City and South London Railway (C&SLR) while the Bakerloo line station was opened sixteen years later by the Baker Street and Waterloo Railway (BS&WR). There is an out-of-station interchange with the nearby Elephant & Castle National Rail station.

A girl born at the station in 1924 was the first baby to be born on the network. The Bakerloo line building remains much as originally constructed and is a typical Leslie Green structure. The Northern line building was designed by Thomas Phillips Figgis, and was rebuilt several times until the current structure opened in 2003. Transport for London (TfL) is currently planning a major upgrade to the station. A Bakerloo line extension south to Camberwell was planned and approved in 1931 but construction never started. Similar proposals have been revived on several occasions; in 2014 TfL ran a consultation on an extension to Hayes and Beckenham Junction, which is still under consideration.

== The station today ==
=== Geography ===
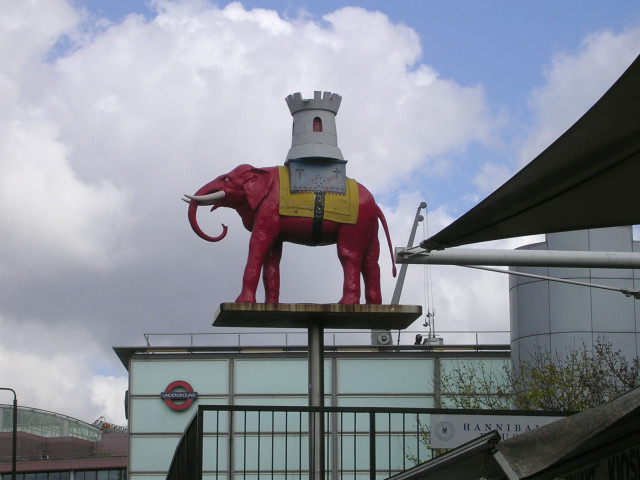
The statue depicting the name 'Elephant & Castle' next to the Northern line entrance (now at Elephant Park)

Elephant & Castle is located in the Elephant and Castle area of Newington in the London Borough of Southwark in central London. The station is in both London fare zone 1 and 2 and is on the Bank branch of the Northern line between Kennington and Borough stations, and is the southern terminus of the Bakerloo line, the next station being Lambeth North. The station has two surface buildings, separated by a large traffic intersection. (Note: The two lines were owned by separate companies at first and not integrated until an underground passageway opened on 10 August 1906.) The northern building provides the most direct access to the Bakerloo line, while the southern one is linked more directly to the Northern line.

=== Station buildings ===
Access to the more northerly (Bakerloo) part of the station is via the original building, while the exit is via a new extension next to Skipton House. Between the entrance and two shops is the entrance to South London House, an office block above the station. The BS&WR station building remains much as originally constructed and is a typical Leslie Green structure. The main alteration is a modern glass-sided and glass-topped flat-roofed extension abutting the original western elevation, giving access to three of the six arches. These arches, in a classic deep-red faience style, formed the original perimeter: two are infilled with street-facing shops. As the station also functions as a drivers' depot, London Underground uses the offices above the station for administration and drivers' accommodation.

The C&SLR station was designed by Thomas Phillips Figgis in a similar style to Kennington station. It was partially rebuilt in the 1920s when the C&SLR tunnels were modernised, and was rebuilt during the construction of the Elephant & Castle shopping centre and roundabout in the 1960s. This Northern line ticket hall was rebuilt at the start of the 21st century, reopening on 12 December 2003 following 2 years of upgrade work.

Neither the Northern line nor Bakerloo line ticket halls have escalators. To get from either ticket hall to the platforms it is necessary to use the lifts or spiral stairs. (Note: There are 117 steps to the Bakerloo line platforms (though the signs incorrectly state 124) and 111 to the Northern line. The northern building has three lifts while the southern has only two.) The southern (Northern line) building has lifts from street level down to the level of the southbound Northern line platform, the only step-free platform at the station. From inside the station, the northern exit is labelled "London South Bank University" and emerges at the southern tip of the triangular campus. (Note: Some but not all exit signs also mention the Imperial War Museum.) The southern exit is labelled "Shopping Centre" and also leads to the National Rail station where there is an out-of-station interchange, allowing Oyster card and contactless payment card users to interchange while paying a single fare for their journey.

=== Heritage feature and refurbishment ===
The multi-coloured platform tiles on the Northern line were reconstructed in the 1920s in conjunction with an extension to Morden station. The tiles were carefully replicated in 2006 to replace the originals, which were in poor condition. The original C&SLR tiles dating from 1890 remain on the tunnel roofs of the Northern line platforms, albeit now covered over by the new cable-management system. (Note: Rarer still are the last surviving pattern tiles still in place on the walls of the Northern line's spiral staircase.) The station was refurbished in 2007. The original maroon and cream tiling on the Bakerloo line platforms has been covered over. Because of the arrangement of the lighting, cabling and public address loudspeakers, it was not possible to arrange the new roundels at alternate 'low' and 'high' positions, all being at the lower level. (Note: The replicated multi-coloured tiles also resulted in the realignment of the roundels.)

== Services ==
=== Bakerloo line ===
Elephant & Castle station is the southern terminus of the Bakerloo line and the next station is Lambeth North to the north. Trains heading northbound terminate at either Queen's Park, Stonebridge Park or Harrow & Wealdstone.

The typical service pattern in trains per hour (tph) is:

- 4tph to Harrow & Wealdstone
- 4tph to Stonebridge Park
- 8tph to Queen's Park

=== Northern line ===
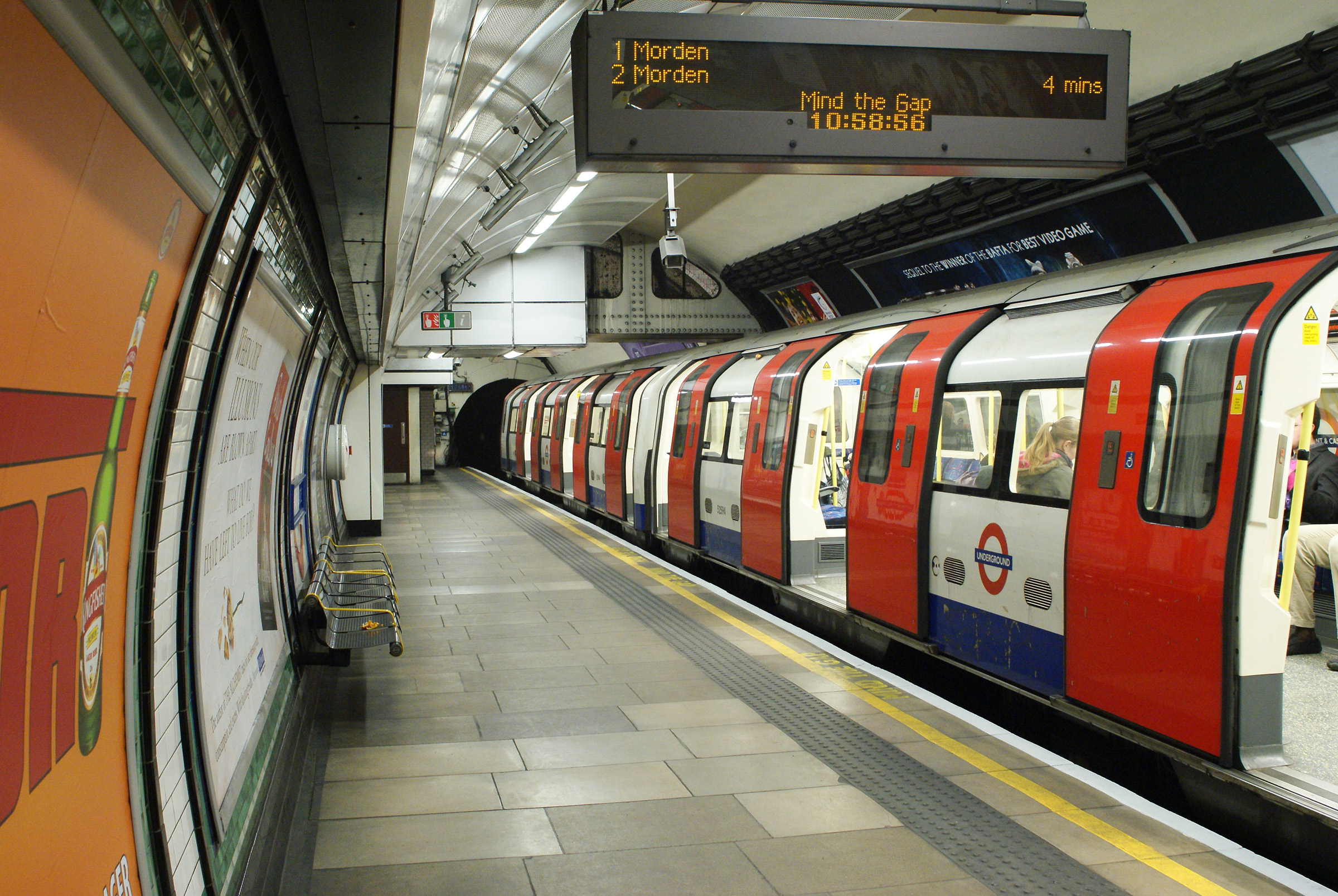
A Northern line train to Morden at the southbound platform looking south

On the Bank or City branch of the Northern line, Elephant & Castle station is between Borough to the north and Kennington to the south.

The typical off-peak service (as of November 2025) in trains per hour (tph) is:

- 2 tph to Mill Hill East (northbound)
- 8 tph to High Barnet (northbound)
- 10 tph to Edgware (northbound)
- 20 tph to Morden (southbound)

Preceding station	London Underground	Following station
Lambeth North towards Harrow & Wealdstone	Bakerloo line	Terminus
Borough towards Edgware, Mill Hill East or High Barnet	Northern line Bank branch	Kennington towards Morden

== Connections ==
A large number of London Buses routes serve the station day and night, stopping outside the station at either Newington Butts (Northern line entrance) or London Road (Bakerloo line entrance).

== History ==
=== Northern line ===
Between 1883 and 1886, a route was planned by the City and South London Railway (C&SLR), then known as the City of London & Southwark Subway (CL&SS), from King William Street via Elephant & Castle to Stockwell and Clapham Common. The entire route was approved on 25 July 1890 (Note: The act was published on 25 July 1890 as the City and South London Railway Act, 1890. At the same time, the company's name was changed from CL&SS to C&SLR.) and the station opened on 18 December 1890 as part of the first successful deep-level tube railway. It ran between King William Street and Stockwell.

In November 1891, the C&SLR recognised the deficiencies of the section between Borough station and King William Street. A new route was chosen with a different pair of tunnels, avoiding this section. Near Borough, the new tunnels would branch off to London Bridge to form an interchange with the mainline station and then north through the City of London to Angel. The plan was approved on 24 August 1893 following a delay. The Act also incorporated another bill of 1893 to grant more time to build the southern extension to Clapham. (Note: The new tunnels permitted by the 1895 Act enabled the track layout at King William Street station to be modified to a single central platform with a track each side. This was opened as a temporary measure while funds for the extensions were raised.) The new route and the first section of the northern extension from Borough to Moorgate opened on 25 February 1900, and the King William Street diversion was closed. The southern extension to Clapham Common opened on 3 June 1900. Work continued on the rest of the northern extension and it opened on 17 November 1901.

In 1912, the C&SLR submitted another bill to increase its capacity by enlarging its tunnels to the larger diameter used for the tunnels of the more recently built railways to allow larger, more modern rolling stock to be used. (Note: A separate bill was published at the same time by the London Electric Railway (a company formed by the UERL in 1910 through a merger of the BS&WR, Great Northern, Piccadilly and Brompton Railway and CCE&HR), which included plans to construct tunnels to connect the C&SLR at Euston to the CCE&HR's station at Camden Town.) Together, the works proposed in these bills would enable the Charing Cross, Euston and Hampstead Railway (CCE&HR)'s trains to run over the C&SLR's route and vice versa, effectively combining the two separate railways. Tunnel enlargement works only restarted after World War I when an extension of time was granted in February 1919. (Note: The work involved expanding the tunnel rings by removing several of the cast iron segments from each tunnel ring, excavating a void behind to the required new diameter and reinstalling the segments with additional packing spacers. The section between Euston and Moorgate was closed from 8 August 1922, but the rest of the line remained open with enlargement works taking place at night.) The Moorgate to Clapham Common section reopened on 1 December 1924, approximately eight months after the rest of the line. (Note: The Euston to Moorgate section reopened on 20 April 1924, along with the new tunnels linking Euston to Camden Town. A train collision on 27 November 1923 caused the Moorgate to Clapham Common section to close.)

=== Bakerloo line ===
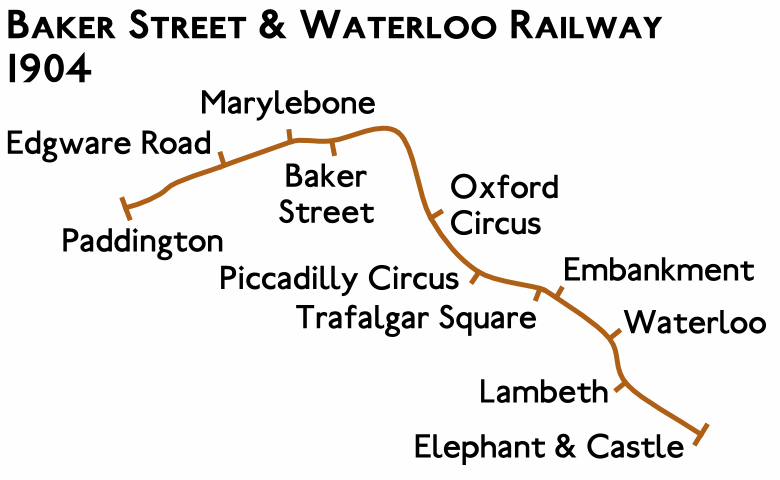
Diagram of the original route of the Bakerloo line from Paddington to Elephant & Castle via Baker Street and Waterloo

In November 1891, a private bill was presented to Parliament for the construction of the Baker Street and Waterloo Railway (BS&WR). The railway was planned to run entirely underground from Marylebone to Elephant & Castle via Baker Street and Waterloo and was approved in 1900. Construction commenced in August 1898 under the direction of Sir Benjamin Baker, W.R. Galbraith and R.F. Church with building work by Perry & Company of Tredegar Works, Bow. (Note: By November 1899, the northbound tunnel reached Trafalgar Square and work on some of the station sites was started, but the collapse of the L&GFC in 1900 led to works gradually coming to a halt. When the UERL was formed in April 1902, 50 per cent of the tunnelling and 25 per cent of the station work was completed. With funds in place, work restarted and proceeded at a rate of 73 feet (22.25 m) per week,. By February 1904, most of the tunnels and underground parts of the stations between Elephant & Castle and Marylebone were complete and works on the station buildings were in progress. The additional stations were incorporated as work continued elsewhere.) Test trains began running in 1905. The first section of the BS&WR was between Baker Street and Lambeth North. The BS&WR station opened on 5 August 1906, almost five months after the rest of the line.

=== Incidents ===
On the morning of 27 November 1923, a slight misjudgement at the end of the tunnel enlargement work left the tunnel unstable near Borough. A collapse on the same day, caused when a train hit temporary shoring near Elephant & Castle, filled the tunnel with wet gravel. Later a gas main exploded, causing a water main to break and leaving a water-filled crater in the middle of the street. The line was briefly split in two, but was completely closed on 28 November 1923.

A girl born at the station on 13 May 1924 was the first baby to be born on the Underground network. According to initial press reports, she had been named Thelma Ursula Beatrice Eleanor (so that her initials would be T.U.B.E.) but this later proved false: her actual name was Mary Ashfield Eleanor Hammond. Her second name Ashfield was from Lord Ashfield, chairman of the railway, who agreed to be the baby's godfather, but said that "it would not do to encourage this sort of thing as I am a busy man."

== Station upgrade and expansion ==
The interchange between the Bakerloo and Northern lines has long been criticised by local residents for its lack of escalators, its winding passageways and its two separate station entrances. Given the increased demand on the Underground station from proposed and under-construction residential development, Southwark Council has called for the expansion and redevelopment of the station, noting in 2008 that it was the "final hurdle" of a deal to redevelop the Shopping Centre. In 2018, the redevelopment of the Elephant and Castle Shopping Centre was approved, with a new station entrance as part of the proposal.

The upgrade and expansion work will include a new station entrance and ticket hall facing Elephant Square, three new escalators, and lifts providing step-free access to the Northern line platforms. The new entrance would also improve the interchange between the Underground and Elephant & Castle railway station, with a more direct route through the new development. The shell of the new ticket hall will be constructed by the developer Delancey; TfL and Southwark Council will share the £15m cost of connecting the shell to the existing platforms and to "fit out" the new ticket hall with escalators and lifts. The Shopping Centre closed in September 2020, allowing construction work to begin. The new ticket hall is scheduled to open in 2028/9.

The new ticket hall has been designed to accommodate the proposed Bakerloo line extension. New Bakerloo tunnels would be dug along with new platforms to accommodate the increase in demand if the Bakerloo line extension comes into service.

== Proposals for the future ==
=== Bakerloo line extension to southeast London ===
An extension to Camberwell from Elephant & Castle was planned and approved in 1931. Elephant & Castle was also to be reconstructed with a third platform to provide the additional reversing capacity, along with a new ticket hall and escalators. Due to the need to prioritise the extension from Baker Street to Finchley Road, to relieve congestion on the Metropolitan line, as well as financial constraints and the outbreak of the Second World War, no work was carried out on the extension. (Note: The 1931 enabling powers were renewed by the Government in 1947 under the Special Enactments (Extension of Time) Act, 1940, and the projected extension as far as Camberwell even appeared on a 1949 edition of the Underground map, but no further work was done. Train indication signs showing Camberwell as a destination were created in anticipation of the southern extension and erected in some Tube stations; these signs were still visible at Warwick Avenue station until the 1990s.) In the 1950s there was a brief revival of the plan, in which it was proposed that Elephant & Castle would not be altered and the additional turn-round capacity would be provided by making Camberwell a three-platform terminus. The project was ultimately unaffordable owing to post-war austerity, reduced demand, and the disproportionately high cost of the project with a three-platform deep-level terminus and the requirement for new trains and a depot.

During 2005–06, a Bakerloo extension was proposed with three route options. The options were extensions to Hayes via Peckham Rye, Beckenham Junction via Camberwell, or Hayes via New Cross. In July 2011, Network Rail recommended an extension of the Bakerloo line from Elephant & Castle to Lewisham, where it would take over the line to Hayes. (Note: This recommendation was noted as requiring further work, and to be delivered on a timescale to be determined. In March 2012 Lewisham Council's consultant on the Bakerloo extension advised: "There is a good to strong, but not overwhelming case for a Bakerloo extension", explaining that many other rail projects in the London area were higher priority, and there was a lack of clarity on the best value route for a Bakerloo extension.) In September 2014, Transport for London ran a consultation on the Bakerloo extension to Hayes and Beckenham Junction with options via Lewisham and Camberwell or Old Kent Road, taking over Network Rail's Hayes line. The cost of the extension is estimated at £2–3 billion with construction expected to take place between the mid-2020s and early 2030s. (Note: The results of this consultation are planned for release during Spring 2015, but the London Boroughs of Southwark, Lewisham and Greenwich, local MPs and London Assembly members have signed a letter supporting this extension.) A February 2017 consultation indicates that the line could extend to Lewisham via Old Kent Road with future extension options later on.
