= Putney Exchange =

Shopping Centre London, United Kingdom

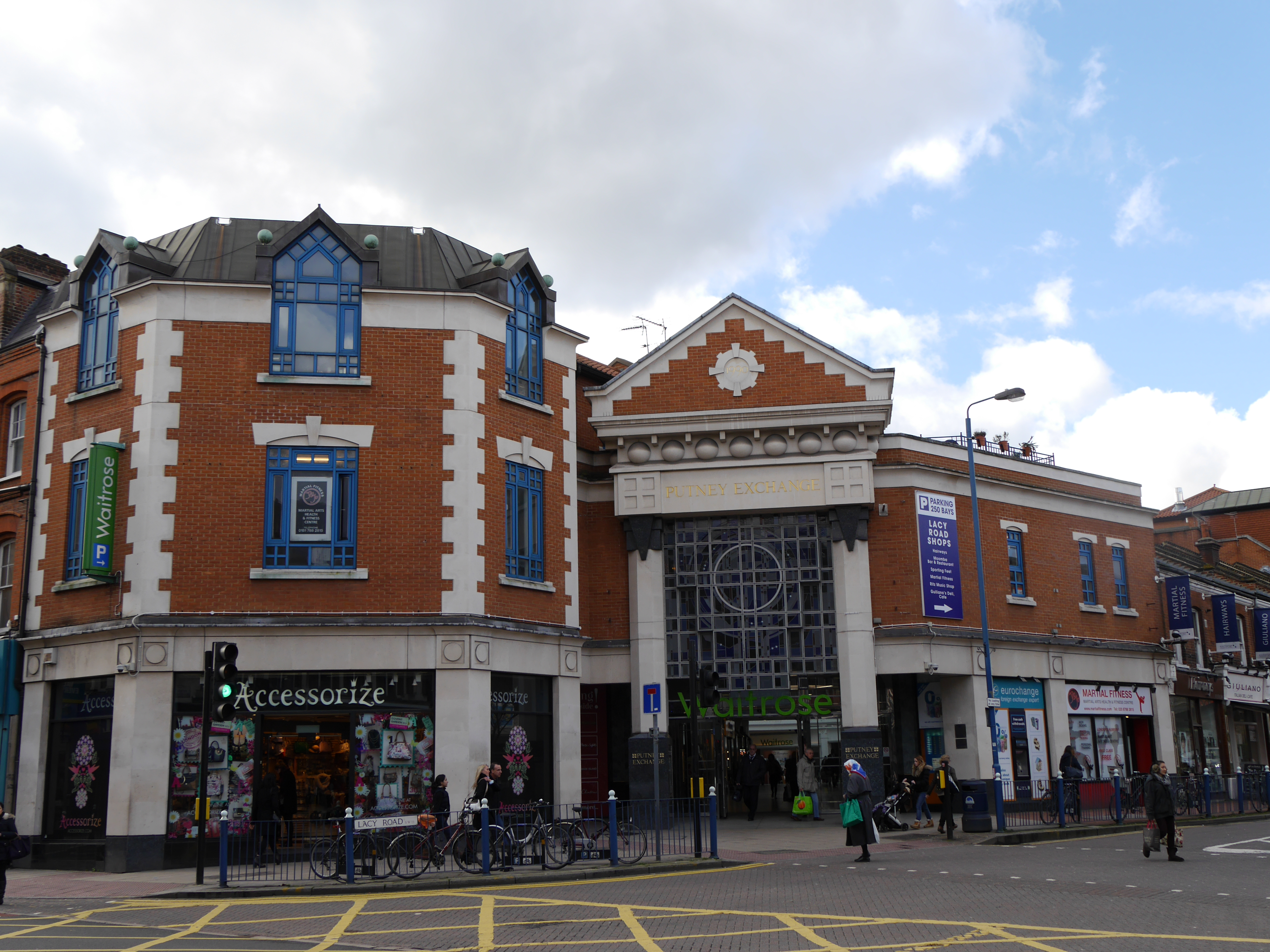
- Location: Putney, London, England
- Coordinates: 51.4636°N 0.2164°W
- Opened: 1990
- Owner: BlackRock
- Num. of stores: 44
- Num. of anchor tenants: 1 - Waitrose
- Floors: 2
- Website: putneyexchange.co.uk

Putney Exchange is an indoor shopping centre in Putney, in the London Borough of Wandsworth. It was built in 1990, revamped in 2014, and is owned by BlackRock.

== Building ==
The building has an area of 140,000 sq ft and features 44 shops, with the anchor tenant being a large Waitrose & Partners supermarket. There are two entrances on Putney High street: at number 98 and at number 72 on the corner with Lacy road.

== History ==
The centre was built in 1990 and is owned by BlackRock, the Waitrose & Partners branch opened in 1996.

In 2012, designs were proposed for a £10 million revamp of the building, the work was completed in May 2014. The centre was awarded Loo of the year in 2013 and in 2017 the escalator and lift area were redesigned.

In 2018 & 2019, plans were submitted by Incipio for the Palmtree rooftop bar, which were met with complaints from local residents

== Transport ==
The Exchange is served by Transport for London buses 14, 39, 74, 85, 93, 424, 430 which stop on Putney High Street. Putney Bridge tube station (District line) is a 9-minute walk away and Putney railway station (Southwestern Railway) is a 5-minute walk.

The centre has a car park on the roof with 290 spaces with an entrance on Lacy road. It includes six electric car charging spaces.
