= Park Street, Hertfordshire =

Village in Hertfordshire, England

Coordinates: 51.722°N 0.339°W

Park Street
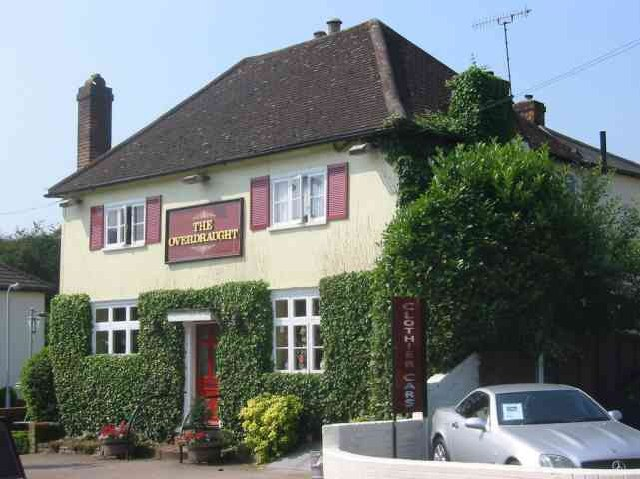
- One of the two remaining public houses

- Location within Hertfordshire
- Population: 6,781 (2001 census – whole ward)
- OS grid reference: TL148040
- Civil parish: St Stephen
- District: St Albans
- Shire county: Hertfordshire
- Region: East
- Country: England
- Sovereign state: United Kingdom
- Post town: ST ALBANS
- Postcode district: AL2
- Dialling code: 01727
- Police: Hertfordshire
- Fire: Hertfordshire
- Ambulance: East of England
- UK Parliament: St Albans

Park Street is a small village (Note: The population relates to all of the local government ward; see ward map for population at statistics.neighbourhood.gov.uk) in Hertfordshire, England. It is on the southern outskirts of St Albans, around 2 miles (3.2 km) south of the city centre, and is separated from the rest of the city's contiguous built-up area by a buffer to the north.

Park Street has a petrol station, several tyre and automotive service businesses and two food-serving public houses; it is of late and initially disparate medieval origin. The village is also home to the penultimate station on the Abbey Line from Watford Junction, which opened in 1858.

Park Street is also a larger local government ward (the largest settlement of which is How Wood and which includes part of Bricket Wood). The area falls within the Metropolitan Green Belt. Residents are mainly employed in nearby cities; east of the street in Frogmore is a substantial business centre and light industrial estate.

== Location ==
Park Street is approximately 2 1/2 miles by road from St Albans via Watling Street (the old Roman road from London to Chester and Holyhead) and then a post-Roman offshoot, St Stephen's Hill, into the medieval city centre.

Just south of the A405/A414 North Orbital Road, Hertfordshire which has a direct spur to the M25 (J21A) and Watford, the A405, road links and rail links are within the village boundaries.

The A405, A414, A5183 (formerly A5, Watling Street) and the former M10 motorway (now numbered as part of the A414 as of 1 May 2009), join at Park Street Roundabout.

To the east and south-east of the village lies the disused Handley Page aerodrome.

== Origin of the name ==
It is thought unlikely the name 'Park' comes from the usual meaning of an enclosure of land for the purpose of hunting but rather simply designates an enclosure of some kind, derived from the Saxon word for enclosure which is ‘pearroc’.

The village lies on the Roman Road of Watling Street which forms the main street and continued as a trunk route for travellers going to and from the north from London during Saxon and Norman times.

== History ==
The immediate village has fourteen heritage-listed buildings, one of which on Watling Street is half-timbered – the majority of the rest being brick built early Victorian buildings – although Toll Cottage on Bury Dell just to the east is 17th century. Most significant to this area would have been the passing trade for villagers to sell ale and produce along Watling Street, and easy access to the markets in St Albans.

Queen Elizabeth I's spy master Sir Francis Walsingham lived at nearby Old Parkbury, south of the village which was the manor house.

There used to be a Sub Post-Office and more shops, however many of these have closed as both How Wood and St Albans provide a larger range of shops.

== Landmarks ==
The main landmark in the village is a mill, which was converted into offices in 1984. During the conversion, a World War II bomb was found in the "Old Smithy's" garden.

There is a village hall, accessed from the A5183. Opened in 1936, it operates as the polling station when required.

Park Street Baptist Church is in Penn Road.

== Railway station ==
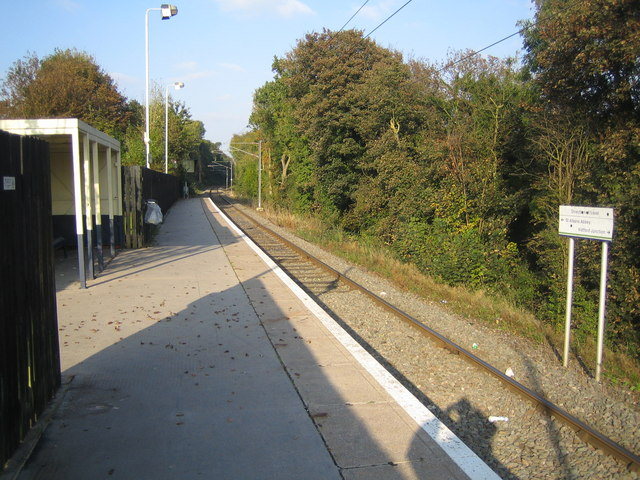
Park Street railway station

Park Street railway station is the first station after St Albans Abbey on the Abbey Line. The railway was built in 1858 as a branch line from the London & Birmingham Railway, and Park Street station has been on its current site since 1890. Before being moved to its current position, on Watling Street, it was situated just near Hyde Lane off Park Street Lane, near the current How Wood station.

There was another railway line, built in 1866, which linked the above London & North Western Railway branch line to St Albans, to the newly constructed Midland Main Line from Bedford to St Pancras at Napsbury. It was a goods line in brief use but closed by 1910, called the Park Street Branch and was operated by the Midland Railway. The railway bridge near Sycamore Drive was demolished around 1948 after being damaged by a giant propeller being delivered to the Handley Page aircraft works. It is still possible to see some of the bridge brickwork here which is just by The Overdraught pub. Another, over the River Ver at the back of Sycamore Drive, still survives. Beyond the bridge over the River Ver this line crossed what became the Handley Page aircraft factory runway. This runway was in use until the mid-1960s for the maintenance and testing of the V bomber fleet.

A 1960s metal bridge carries the Abbey Line trains, sometimes affectionately dubbed the Abbey Flyer, over the main road, replacing a previous brick one.

== Schools ==
Park Street has two primary schools: Park Street Church of England Primary School, and How Wood Primary School.

The nearest secondary school is Marlborough Science Academy .

== Parks and sport ==
Park Street has three parks:

- Recreation Ground by sports fields on Park Street Lane: Park Street Football Club and the cricket (sport) ground and pavilion.
- Mayflower Road Park
- Frogmore Lakes Park, to the south of the village just past the gravel pits, popular for fishing.

There was also a large park along Burydell/ Bury Dell Lane; replaced by the vegetable allotments, this was in use at least until 1900.
