= How Wood =

Village in Hertfordshire, England

Coordinates: 51.71956°N 0.35026°W

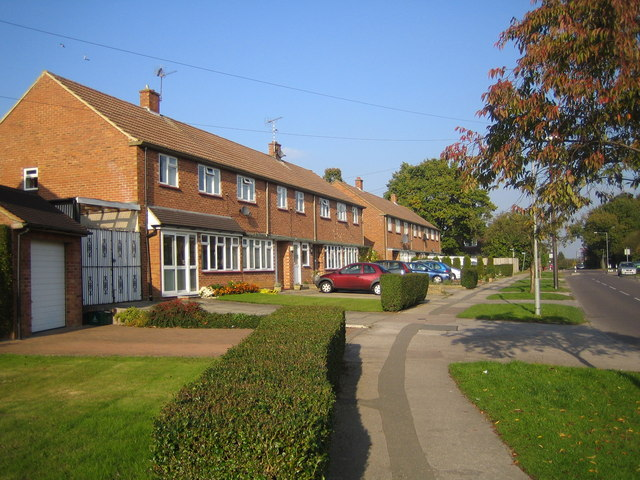
- Average housing stock in How Wood

- Location within Hertfordshire
- Population: 3,542 (2001 census)
- OS grid reference: TL141036
- Civil parish: St Stephen
- District: St Albans
- Shire county: Hertfordshire
- Region: East
- Country: England
- Sovereign state: United Kingdom
- Post town: ST ALBANS
- Postcode district: AL2
- Dialling code: 01727
- Police: Hertfordshire
- Fire: Hertfordshire
- Ambulance: East of England
- UK Parliament: St Albans

How Wood is a residential village, south of Park Street village between the centres of Watford and St Albans in St Stephen civil parish, Hertfordshire, England.

The district council (in this instance, mid-tier of local government) is the City and District of St Albans, named after the homonymous historic cathedral city, whose boundaries are contiguous with the village via neighbouring villages and hamlets.

Although the area was once part of Park Street, development took place in most of the agricultural fields around Park Street Lane. Park Street joined the City Council rather than St Stephen civil parish. How Wood has grown to a sizeable residential area: its population in 2001 was 3,542. The area has the physical divide from Park Street of a railway line bridge adjoining two fields and a wood leading down to increasingly riverside woodland in Park Street, which sits on the river Ver in the northwest.

== Amenities ==
There is a row of shops in How Wood, including a co-op, an off-licence, a stationery shop and a bakery that is well known in Hertfordshire (Simmons). Park Street Lane leads under the railway line and then is immediately in the edge of the village centre of Park Street; in the centre are a barber's and two pubs.

There are two schools, one outlying and one on the main street. How Wood has its own primary school, How Wood Primary School and Nursery.

The main street is a by-road to St Albans as it is from Bricket Wood only.The main street has three listed buildings, at Grade II: Park Cottage, The Homestead and Orchard Cottage. Burstone Manor Farm has mainly plant nurseries and some fisheries between the village and Chiswell Green - it is at the higher Grade II* and is a much older timber frame building, some of it 12th-century, the remainder of it 15th- and 17th-century, with new casements and a moat. Between the housing estates and Burstone Manor Farm are the smaller remains of How Wood and the larger Birch Wood.

Park Street and St Albans offer nearby eateries and bars, several adjoining the River Ver which is opposite Park Street Village and has the closest watercress beds to London.

== Transport ==
The village is served by How Wood railway station on the Abbey Line, linking it with St Albans Abbey and Watford Junction.

== Site of Special Scientific Interest ==
Moor Mill Quarry, West, a geological Site of Special Scientific Interest, is located on the other side of the railway line.
