= Moor Mill Quarry, West =

Site of Special Scientific Interest in Hertfordshire

Coordinates: 51.711814°N 0.35057670°W

- Site of Special Scientific Interest
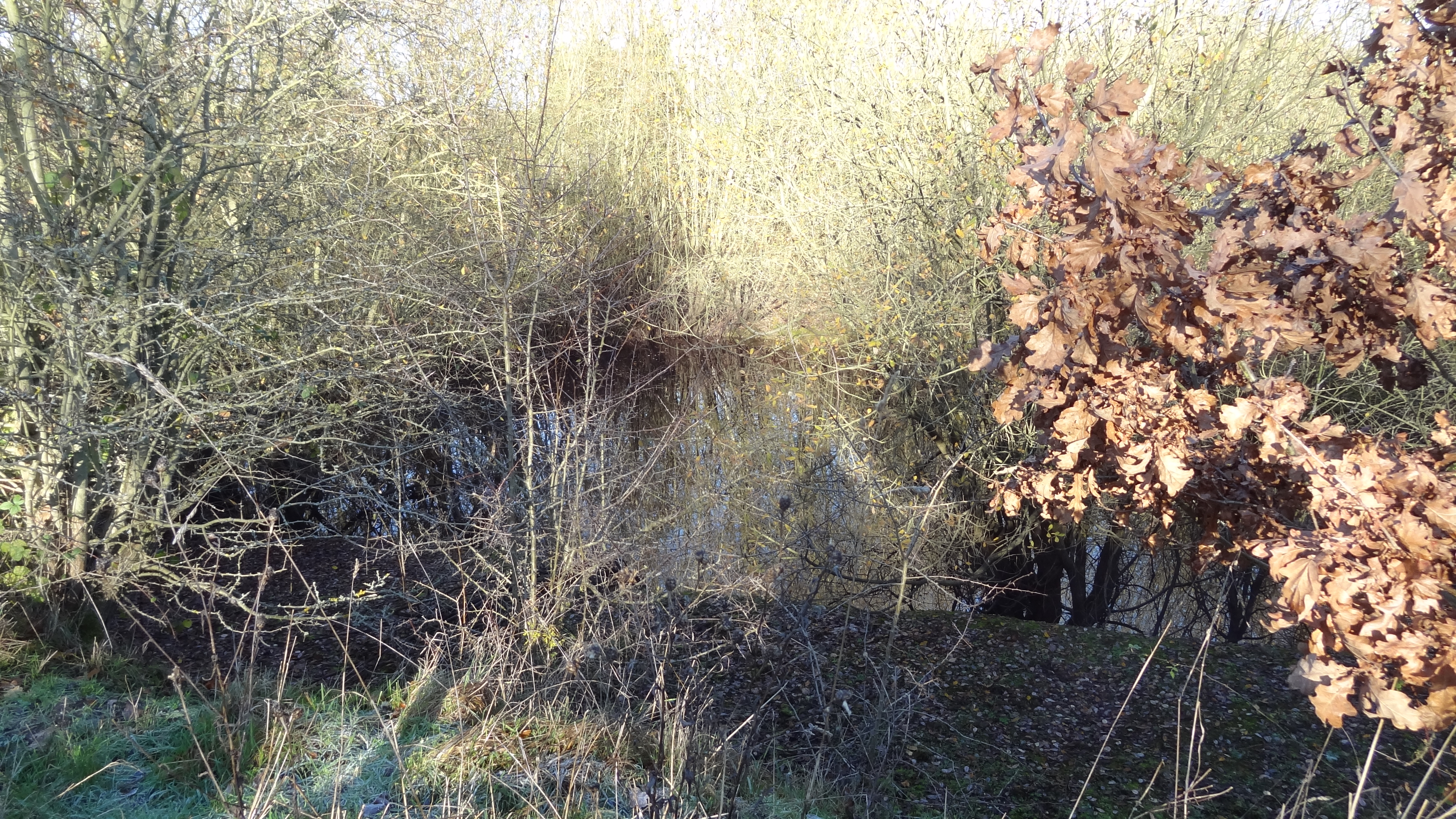
- The water at the bottom of the quarry is just visible
- Location of Moor Mill Quarry, West.
- Area of search: Hertfordshire
- Grid reference: TL141027
- Interest: Geological
- Area: 0.16 ha (0.40 acres)
- Notification date: 1992
- Location map: Magic Map

Moor Mill Quarry, West is a 0.16-hectare (0.40-acre) geological Site of Special Scientific Interest in How Wood in Hertfordshire. The local planning authority is St Albans City and District Council. It was notified in 1992 as representing the former Moor Mill Quarry SSSI, which was lost to landfill operations. It is listed by the Geological Conservation Review.

The pit shows a sequence of Pleistocene Anglian and pre-Anglian deposits. It displays an early blocking of the pre-Anglian Thames Valley, at a time when the River Thames followed a more northerly course, resulting in the formation of a lake. This was overrun by a second advance of ice during the Anglian glaciation around 450,000 years ago, which diverted the Thames to its present course and initiated Colne drainage in the area. The site is regarded by Natural England as of fundamental importance as the only one which demonstrates the diversion of the Thames from its pre-Anglian course.

There is no access to the deep quarry, which is partly filled with water, but it can be viewed by crossing the railway line at How Wood station and turning south to follow the east side of the Abbey Line.

== See also ==
- List of Sites of Special Scientific Interest in Hertfordshire
