= Watford station =

Watford station may refer to:

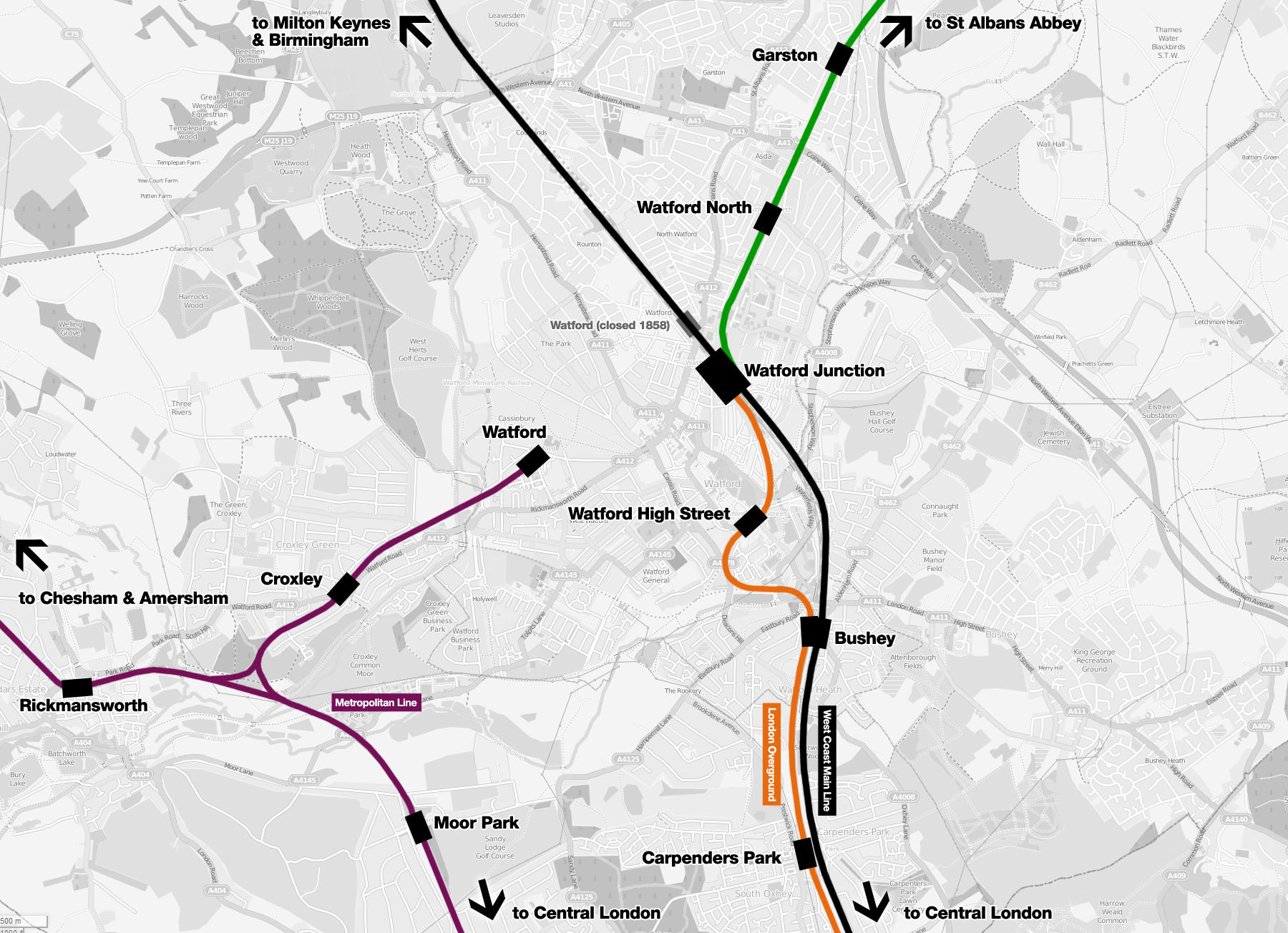
Map of railway stations in Watford

Existing stations

- Watford tube station
- Watford High Street railway station
- Watford Junction railway station
- Watford North railway station

Stations not in use

- Watford railway station (1837–1858) (closed)
- Watford Central tube station (planned but never built)
- Watford West railway station (closed)
- Watford Stadium railway station (closed)

== See also ==
- Category:Railway stations in Watford
