= Park Street railway station (England) =

Railway station in Hertfordshire, England

Park Street
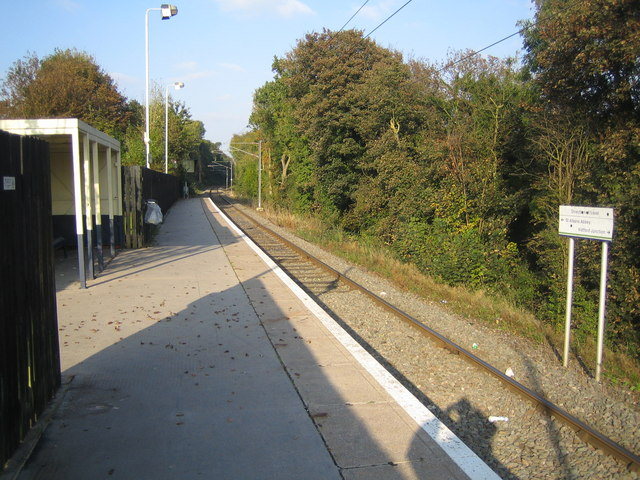

General information
- Location: Park Street, St Albans; England
- Coordinates: 51.7249°N 0.3402°W
- Grid reference: TL147042
- Manager: London Northwestern Railway
- Platforms: 1

Other information
- Station code: PKT
- Classification: DfT category F2

Key dates
- 1858: Opened
- 1859: Station closed
- 1861: Station re-opened

Passengers
- 2021/22: ▲9,394
- 2022/23: ▲16,842
- 2023/24: ▲16,980
- 2024/25: ▲22,170
- 2025/26: ▲28,762
Location
Notes
- Passenger statistics from the Office of Rail and Road

Park Street railway station serves the village of Park Street, Hertfordshire, England. It is the penultimate station on the Abbey Line. The station and all trains serving it are operated by London Northwestern Railway.

== History ==
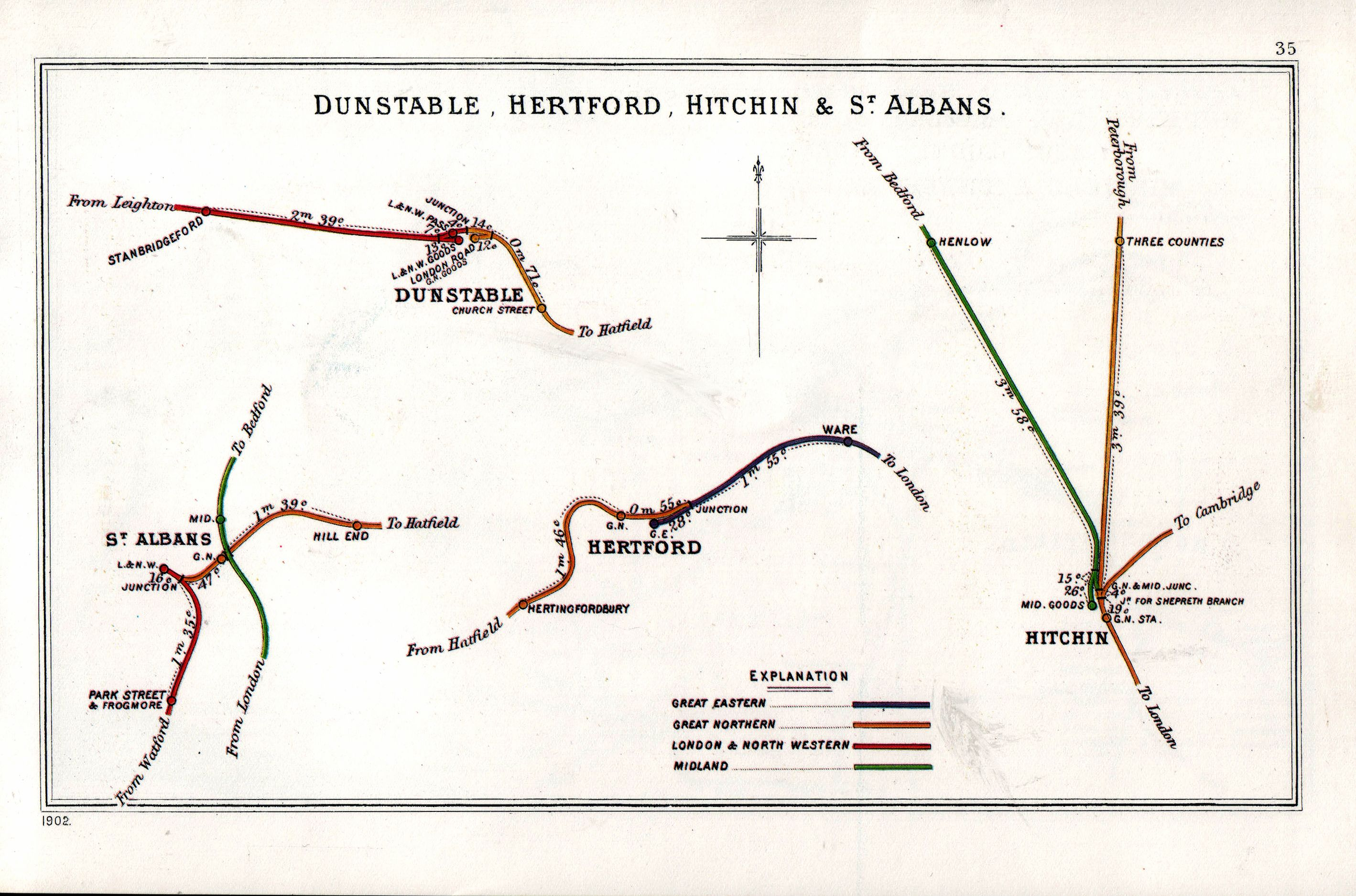
A 1902 Railway Clearing House map of railways in the vicinity of Park Street & Frogmore (bottom left)

The station opened as Park Street & Frogmore in 1858, when the London and North Western Railway built its branch line from Watford Junction to St Albans. It was not an immediate success, and was closed from 1859 until 1861. It had been relocated to its present position by the 1890s. The station was renamed Park Street on 6 May 1974. In 1988, How Wood railway station was built on the station's original site.

It is now a simple unstaffed halt, like all the other stations on the line, with the exception of Watford Junction.

== Services ==
All services at Park Street are operated by London Northwestern Railway using Class 350 EMUs.

The typical off-peak service on all days of the week is one train per hour in each direction between Watford Junction and St Albans Abbey. This is increased to a train approximately every 45 minutes in each direction during the peak hours.

Preceding station	National Rail	Following station
How Wood towards Watford Junction	London Northwestern Railway Abbey Line	St Albans Abbey Terminus

== Future ==
In December 2017 responsibility for the branch line passed from London Midland to London Northwestern Railway. Installation of Oyster Card readers on the stations along the branch is a possibility, although there are other ticketing options too.

Restoration of the crossing loop at Bricket Wood is being considered by the local authorities and Network Rail, which would facilitate trains running every 30 minutes.
