= Garston railway station =

Garston railway station may refer to:

- Garston railway station (Hertfordshire)
- Garston railway station (Merseyside)
