= Watford railway station (1837–1858) =

Former railway station in England

Watford station
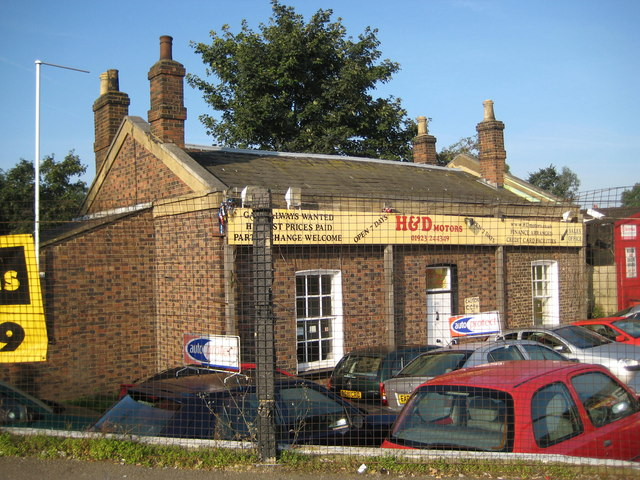
- The original 1837 Watford railway station

General information
- Location: Watford; England
- Coordinates: 51.6663548°N 0.3996396°W

Other information
- Status: Disused

History
- Original company: London and Birmingham Railway

Key dates
- 1837: Station opened
- 5 May 1858: Station closed
Location

Watford railway station was a railway station in Watford, Hertfordshire in the UK. It was opened by the London and Birmingham Railway (L&BR) and it was the first railway station to open in Watford. It closed in 1858 when it was replaced by Watford Junction railway station. Today the small ticket office is still standing and it is a Grade II listed building.

== History ==
Watford station was situated on the north side of St Albans Road, approximately 300 metres (330 yd) further down the line from London than the present-day Watford Junction station. This small, single-storey red-brick building was built in 1836–37 when the first section of the London and Birmingham Railway (L&BR) was opened between London and Boxmoor. It was designed by the architect George Aitchison. The station provided first and second-class waiting rooms, a departure yard, a carriage shed and engine house. The platforms were situated in a deep cutting which was accessed via a staircase.

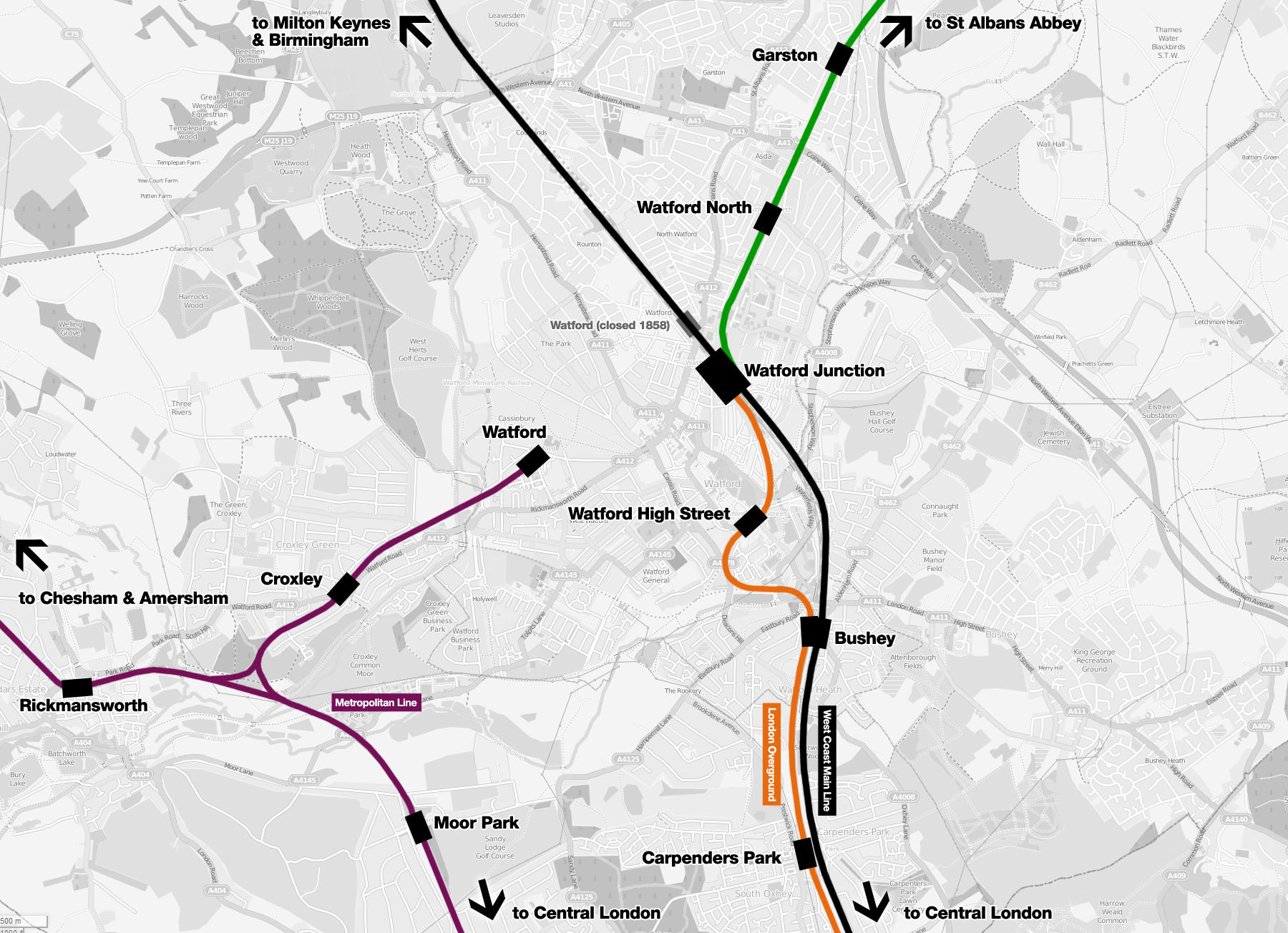
Map of railways in Watford, showing the old and new Watford stations

By 1839, the station is recorded in the Bucks Herald as having a corrugated iron roof, an engine shed and stationary pumping house with a tall chimney, and a footbridge.

In its 21 years of operation it also served as a station for royalty; in the short period when the Dowager Queen Adelaide was resident at Cassiobury House (c. 1846–1849), this station was remodelled to provide her with a royal waiting room, and it was also reportedly used by Queen Victoria and Prince Albert on a trip to visit Sir Robert Peel in November 1843, when they travelled by road from Windsor Castle to take a train from Watford to Tamworth.

From 1846, the L&BR was absorbed into the London and North Western Railway (LNWR). The old Watford station closed when it was replaced by the larger Watford Junction station, which opened on 5 May 1858. The new station was located south of St Albans Road in order to accommodate the newly constructed branch line to St Albans and later, the Watford and Rickmansworth Railway and the Watford DC Line. The junction station was rebuilt in 1909, and was extensively redeveloped in the 1980s.

== The building today ==
The Grade-II-listed Old Station House still stands at 147A St Albans Road, a rare surviving example of architecture from the beginning of the railway age. It is one of two surviving intermediate station buildings in Britain from the early railways, the other being the original Hampton-in-Arden station building, built by the Birmingham and Derby Junction Railway in 1837. Until 2018, the building was occupied by a second-hand car dealership. As of 2021 it stands in the middle of the Watford Cross property development and plans have been announced to convert the building into a craft beer tap room.

Preceding station	Historical railways	Following station
Kings Langley (Note: Prior to 1839, the next station was Boxmoor, now called Hemel Hempstead); Line and station open	London and Birmingham Railway	Harrow (Note: Now called Harrow & Wealdstone.); Line and station open

== See also ==
- Watford station – a list of stations past and present
