= St Stephen, Hertfordshire =

Civil parish in Hertfordshire, England

Coordinates: 51.735°N 0.360°W

St Stephen
- Location within Hertfordshire
- Area: 8.99 sq mi (23.3 km^{2})
- Population: 13,865 (2011)
  - Density: 1,542/sq mi (595/km^{2})
- OS grid reference: TL132053
  - London: 17 mi (27 km) SSE
- Civil parish: St Stephen
- District: St Albans
- Shire county: Hertfordshire
- Region: East
- Country: England
- Sovereign state: United Kingdom
- Post town: ST ALBANS
- Postcode district: AL2
- Post town: ABBOTS LANGLEY
- Postcode district: WD5
- Post town: RADLETT
- Postcode district: WD7
- Police: Hertfordshire
- Fire: Hertfordshire
- Ambulance: East of England
- Website: St Stephen Parish Council

St Stephen is a civil parish in the St Albans City and District in Hertfordshire, England. It is located approximately 17 miles (27 km) north-northwest of central London, straddling the M25 motorway and immediately adjacent to the southern boundary of St Albans. St Stephen is a partly urbanised parish with multiple centres of activity and open land that forms part of the Metropolitan Green Belt. The local council is St Stephen Parish Council. The parish covers Bricket Wood, Chiswell Green, Frogmore, Colney Street, How Wood and Park Street. It is an ancient parish, and sections of it were transferred to St Albans progressively up to 1935. At the 2011 census it had a population of 13,865.

== History ==
St Stephen is an ancient parish named after the 10th century St Stephen's Church in St Albans. Part of the parish was within the Municipal Borough of St Albans from 1835 until 1894. The part within the borough was transferred to the parish of St Albans in 1894.

The remaining part of the parish became part of St Albans Rural District in 1894 and the St Stephen Parish Council was created.

335 acres of the parish were transferred to St Albans in 1913 and 712 acres in 1935.

== Government ==
St Stephen Parish Council is elected from wards as follows:

- Bricket Wood (4 councillors)
- Chiswell Green (3 councillors)
- Park Street (5 councillors)

The parish council offices are in Bricket Wood.

== Geography ==
The parish is located to the southwest of St Albans and includes the areas of Bricket Wood, Chiswell Green, Colney Street, Frogmore, How Wood and Park Street.
