= Bricket Wood railway station =

Railway station in Hertfordshire, England

Coordinates: 51.7058°N 0.359°W

Bricket Wood
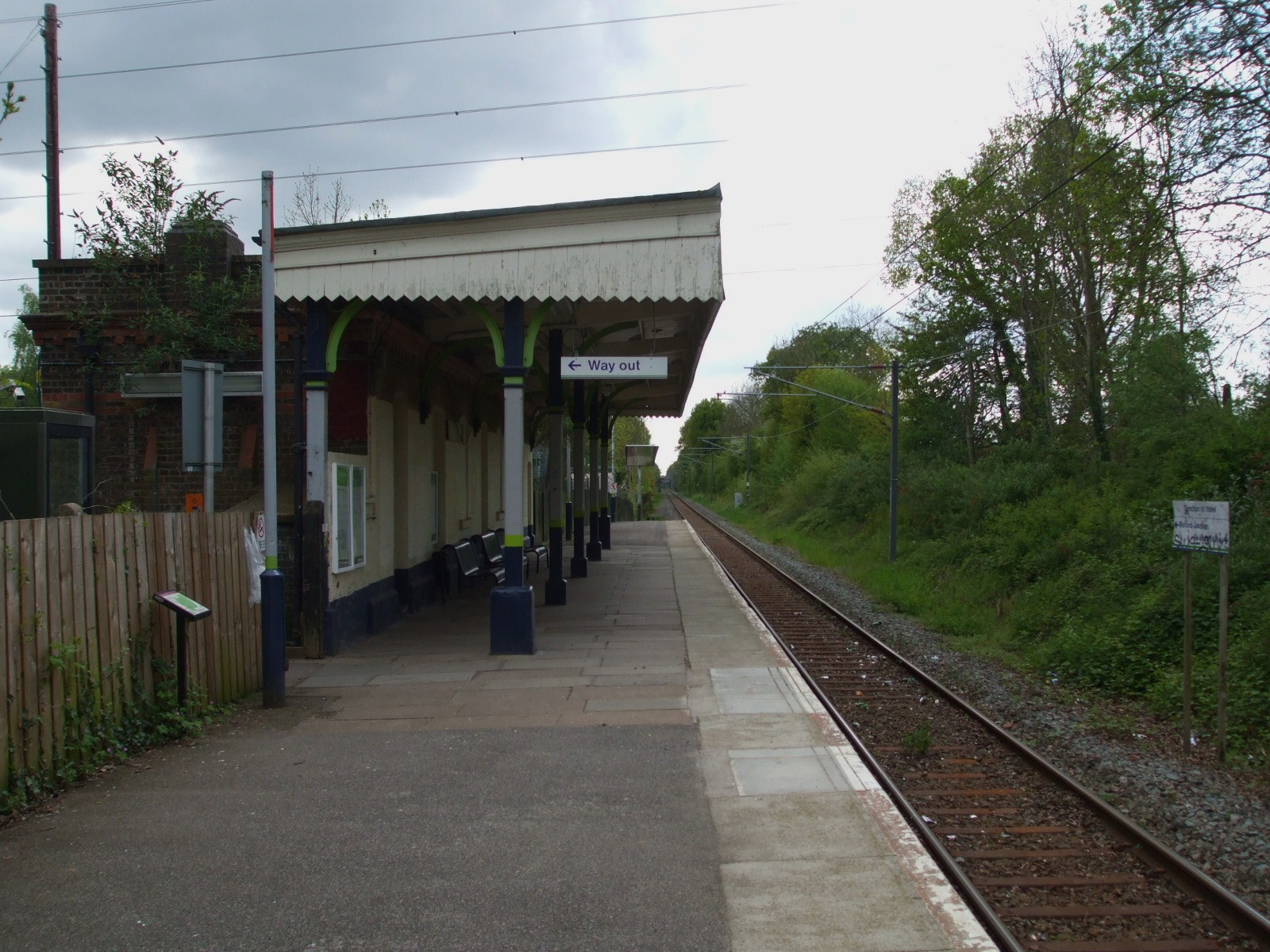

General information
- Location: Bricket Wood, St Albans; England
- Grid reference: TL134020
- Manager: London Northwestern Railway
- Platforms: 1

Other information
- Station code: BWO
- Classification: DfT category F2

History
- Opened: 1858

Key dates
- 5 May 1858: Station opened
- 1859: Station closed
- 1861: Station re-opened
- 1913: Installation of 2nd platform and crossing loop
- 1966: Demolition of 2nd platform and loop

Passengers
- 2021/22: ▲13,060
- 2022/23: ▲21,708
- 2023/24: ▲23,234
- 2024/25: ▲27,058
- 2025/26: ▲34,152
Location
Notes
- Passenger statistics from the Office of Rail and Road

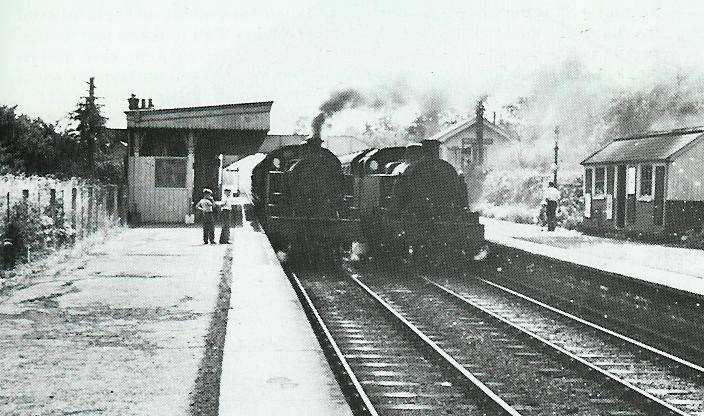
The old passing loop at Bricket Wood station in the 1960s

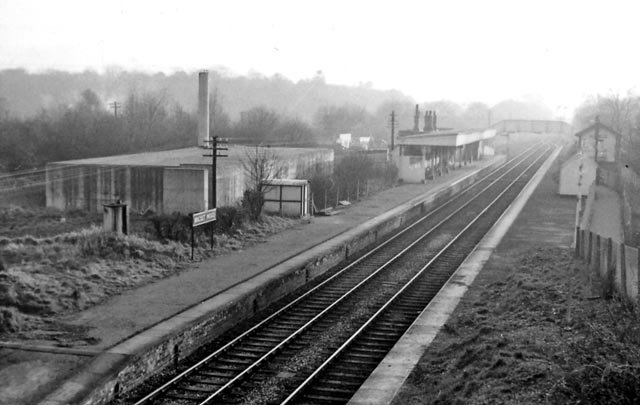
View southwest toward Watford Junction in 1961

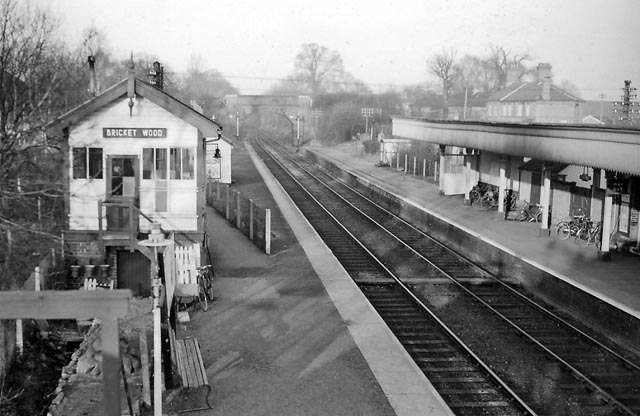
View northeast toward St Albans Abbey in 1961

Bricket Wood railway station is in the village of Bricket Wood, Hertfordshire, England, on the Abbey Line 3 1/4 miles (5 km) east of Watford Junction. The station and all trains serving it are operated by London Northwestern Railway.

== History ==
The station once had a crossing loop and a second platform that could accommodate long excursion trains. Many Edwardian families from London came here to enjoy the fresh air, woodland, and two large funfairs that once stood nearby.

The station building is the only surviving original building on the line. Long disused, the building has been restored and turned into a tea room and cafe. Responsibility for the line, including Bricket Wood, passed in November 2007 from Silverlink to London Midland.

The station was used in the films The Cuckoo Patrol, Victoria the Great, Poison Pen, Double Confession, Night of the Demon, Impact and She'll Have to Go.

=== Emergency Railway Control Centre ===
In the 1950s, in response to fears of Soviet military action, plans were prepared for the construction of twenty-five atom-bomb-proof control bunkers away from expected target areas. Only five were completed; the one at Bricket Wood is situated in the trees between the station and Railway Cottages. It was built c. 1954 in order, in the event of war, to take over the running of the railway network from the London Euston control room.

As of 2014, only two remained in England. The control centre built at Bricket Wood is a postwar Standard District Control Building Type L built, measuring roughly 11m x 29m. Of reinforced concrete construction, it has a single protected doorway in each of the shorter walls. This would appear to be the sole surviving example of this type in England; one other survives in Scotland, at Burntisland, Fife.

== Services ==
All services at Bricket Wood are operated by London Northwestern Railway using Class 350 EMUs.

The typical off-peak service on all days of the week is one train per hour in each direction between Watford Junction and St Albans Abbey. This is increased to a train approximately every 45 minutes in each direction during the peak hours.

| Preceding station | National Rail | Following station |
|---|---|---|
| Garston towards Watford Junction | London Northwestern Railway Abbey Line | How Wood towards St Albans Abbey |

== Future ==
Installation of Oyster card readers on the stations along the branch is a possibility, although other ticketing options exist.

Restoration of the crossing loop, which would facilitate trains running every 30 minutes, is being considered by the local authorities and Network Rail.
