= Watford North railway station =

Railway station in Hertfordshire, England

Coordinates: 51.676°N 0.390°W

Watford North
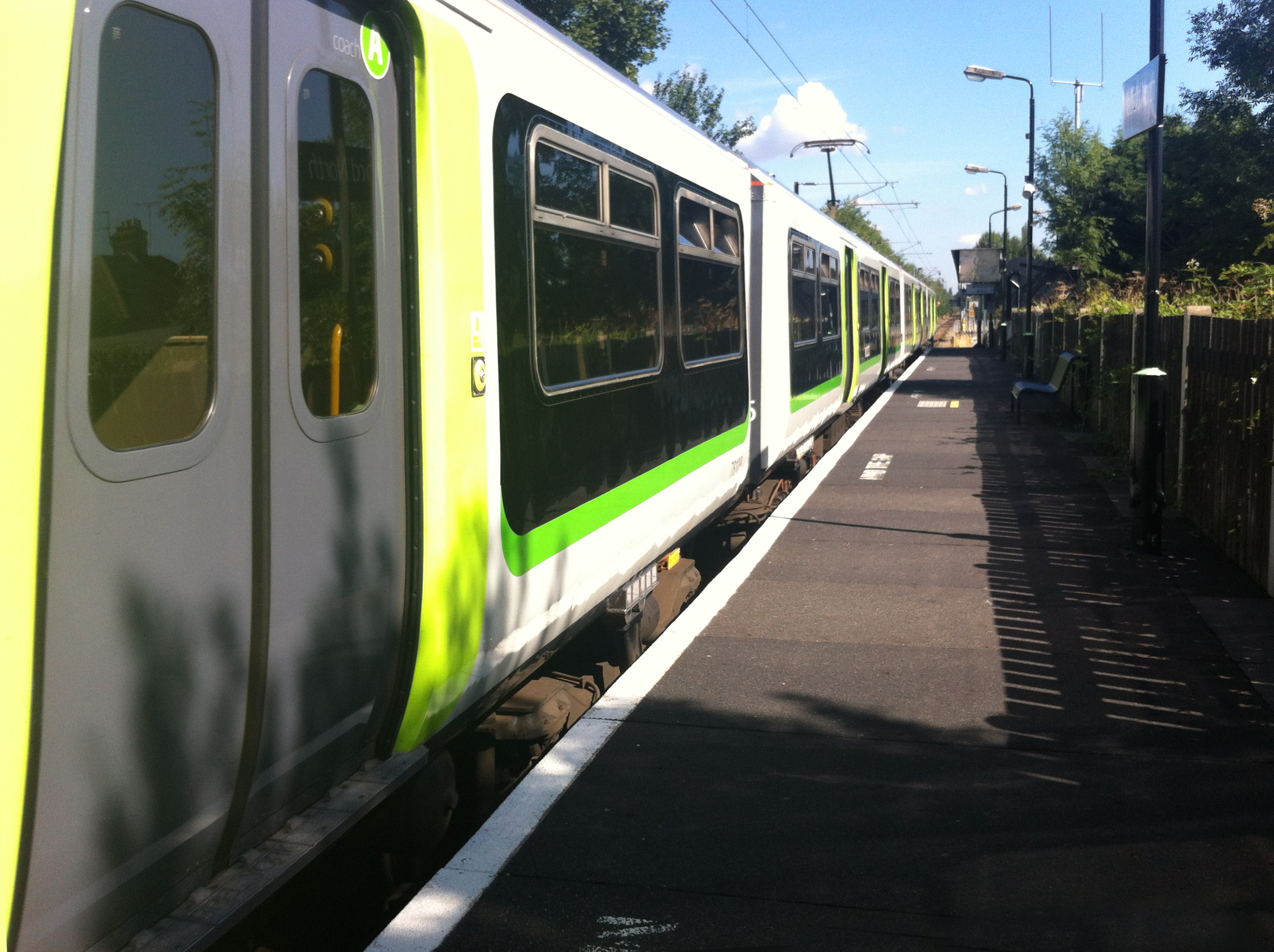

General information
- Location: North Watford, Watford; England
- Grid reference: TQ114986
- Managed by: London Northwestern Railway
- Platforms: 1

Other information
- Station code: WFN
- Classification: DfT category F2

History
- Opened: October 1910

Passengers
- 2020/21: ▼14,274
- 2021/22: ▲30,930
- 2022/23: ▲53,728
- 2023/24: ▼53,412
- 2024/25: ▲64,798
Location
Notes
- Passenger statistics from the Office of Rail and Road

Watford North railway station is a National Rail station which serves the North Watford area in Hertfordshire, England in the United Kingdom. It is the first station on the Abbey Line, a single-track branch line which runs from Watford Junction to St Albans Abbey and is located approximately 3/4 mile (1.2 km) north east of Watford Junction. It is adjacent to a level crossing where the Abbey Line crosses Bushey Mill Lane.

Watford North is one of three railway stations in the central Watford area and is operated as an unstaffed railway halt. The Abbey Line service is known locally as the "Abbey Flyer".

== History ==
The branch line to St Albans was opened in 1858 by the London and North Western Railway (LNWR). Watford North station opened 52 years later, in October 1910. Originally named Callowland, the station was built to serve a developing residential and industrial area which still thrives today. It was renamed Watford North in 1927. After the nationalisation of Britain's railways in 1948, the line was run by British Rail (from 1986 under its Network SouthEast brand).

As passenger and goods usage dwindled in the 1950s and 60s, the stations on the line were downgraded to unstaffed halts.

In 1963, Watford North and the Abbey line were threatened with closure as part of the Beeching cuts, but the line was kept in service. In 1995, a proposal was made to run a reduced service on the Abbey line with diesel trains instead of electric trains. An advocacy group, known as Abfly, was formed to campaign for the line to be maintained and continues to lobby for improvements to the service today. After the privatisation of British Rail the franchise for the Abbey Line was taken over by National Express who ran the line under its Silverlink Metro name until November 2007, when Govia, operating as London Midland, took over the franchise.

The Community Rail Partnership for the Abbey Line, established in 2005, works to improve the Abbey Line and inspects stations such as Watford North at least once a week.

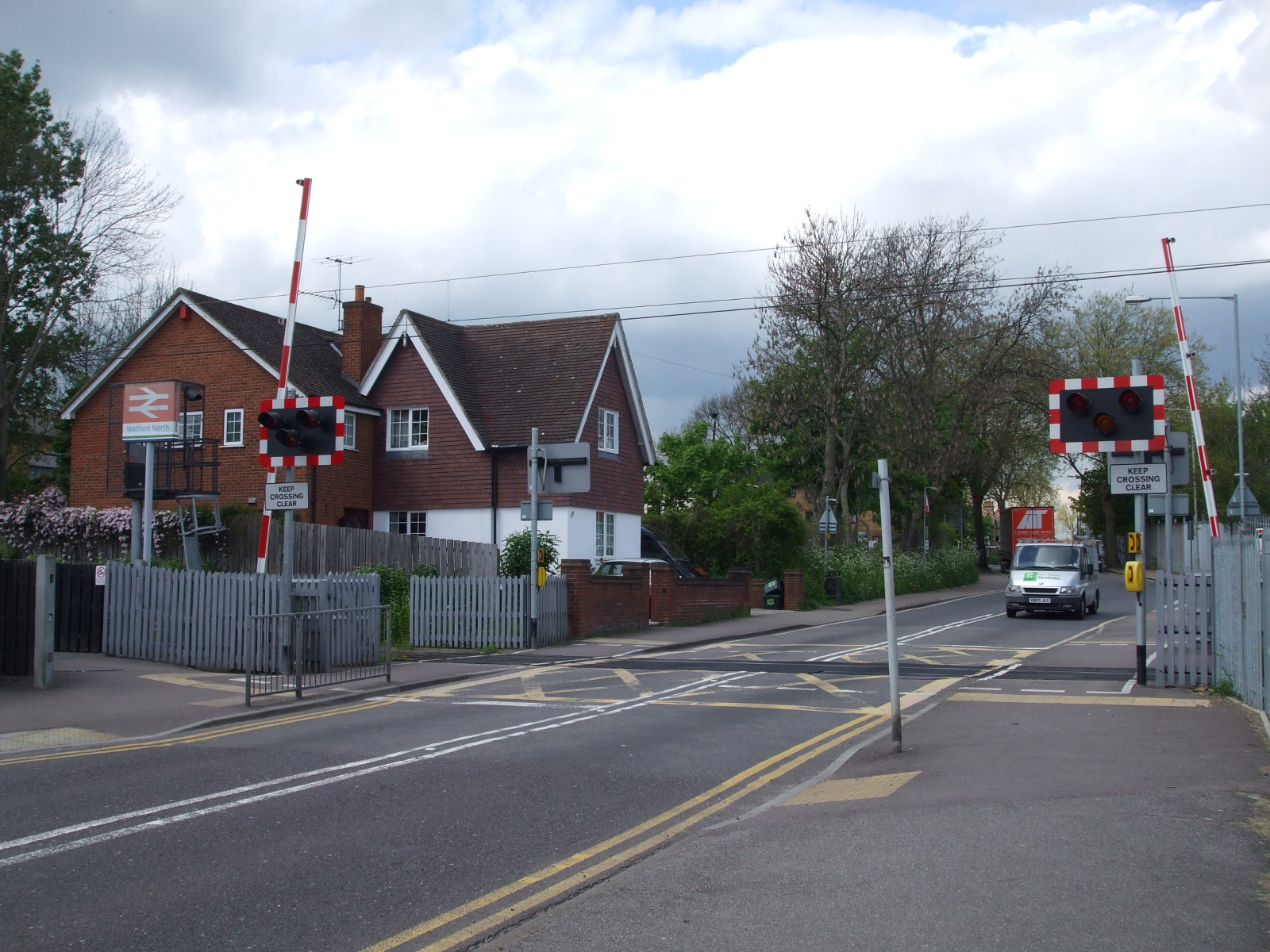
The level crossing next to Watford North

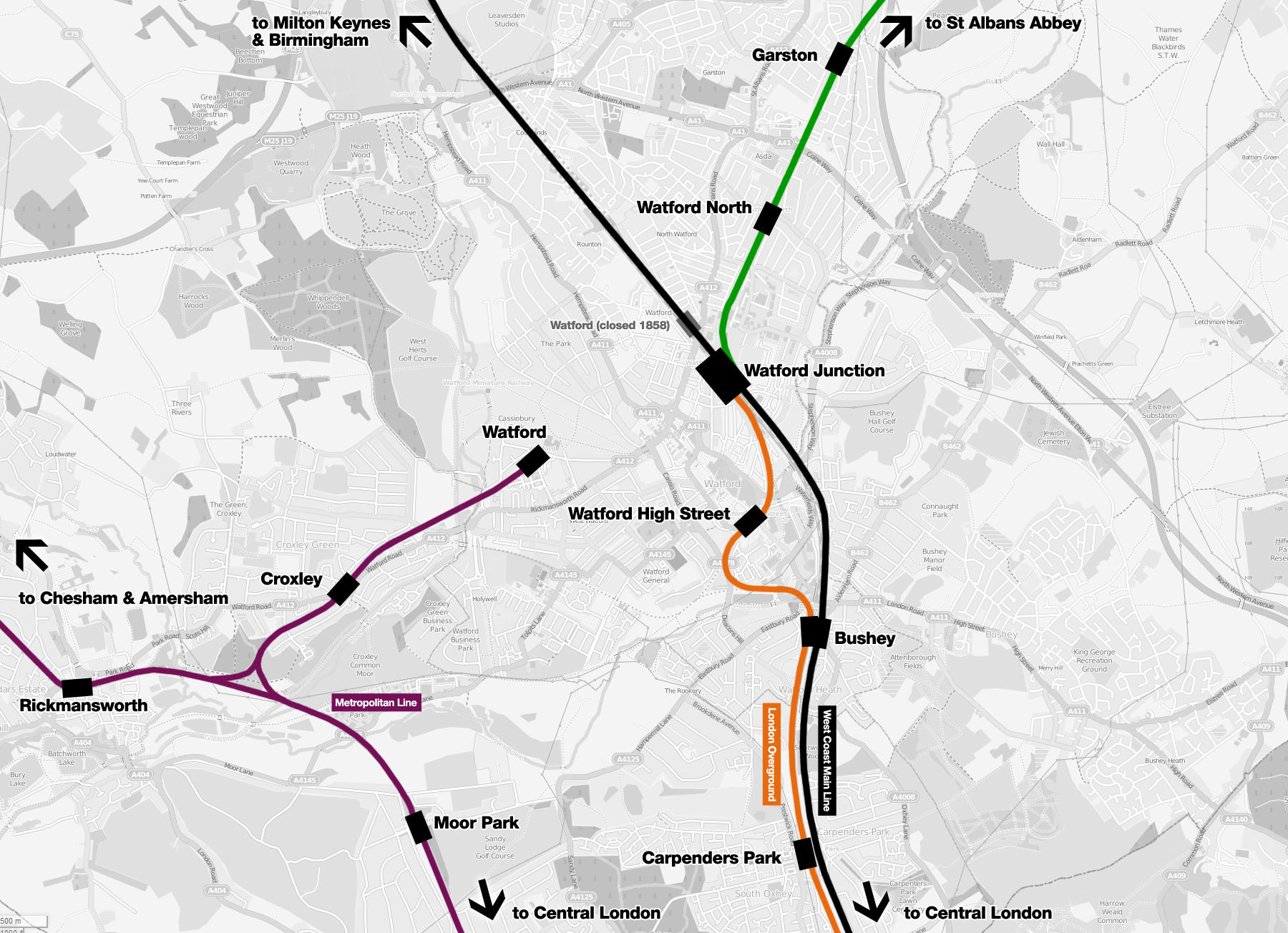
Map of railways around Watford town centre, showing Watford North

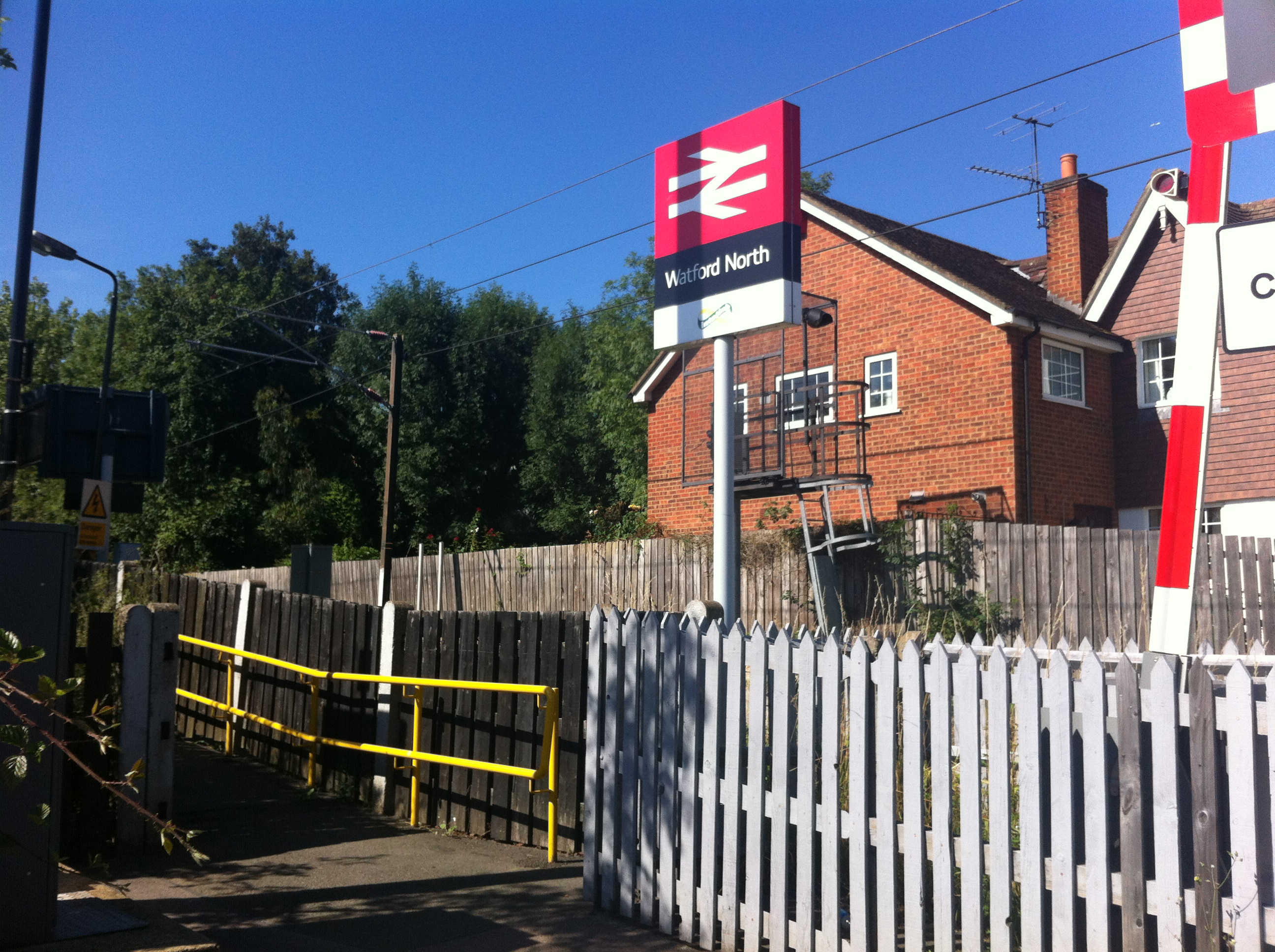
Entrance to the station

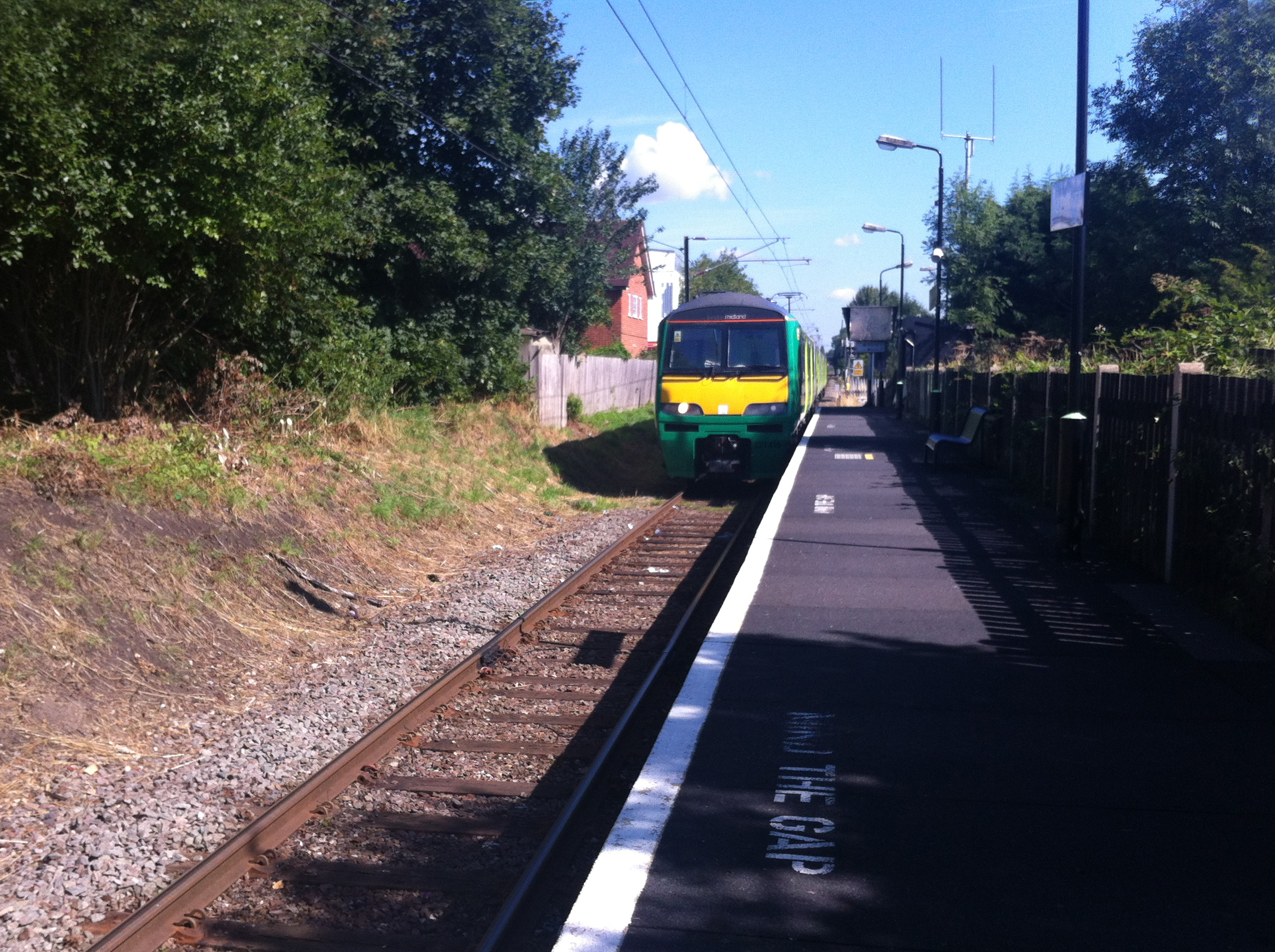
London Midland operates the "Abbey flyer" service through Watford North

== Services ==
All services at Watford North are operated by London Northwestern Railway using Class 350 EMUs.

The typical off-peak service on all days of the week is one train per hour in each direction between Watford Junction and St Albans Abbey. This is increased to a train approximately every 45 minutes in each direction during the peak hours.

Preceding station	National Rail	Following station
Watford Junction Terminus	London Northwestern Railway Abbey Line	Garston towards St Albans Abbey

== Future ==
A number of possible changes to the line have been proposed, including new means of buying tickets, and the restoration of a passing loop at Bricket Wood, which would facilitate a 30-minute service.

Plans were announced in October 2009 for the line to be converted to light rail. The line and stations were to be leased to Hertfordshire County Council who would run a tram-train service from Watford Junction to St Albans Abbey. Longer-term proposals envisaged extension into St Albans city centre, possibly to St Albans City railway station. It was estimated that the tram line would be in operation by 2012, but the project was cancelled due to the complications and expense of transferring the line from National Rail to the county council. For the foreseeable future, Watford North will continue to be served by heavy rail trains.
