= Bricket Wood =

Village in Hertfordshire, England

Coordinates: 51.7067°N 0.3686°W

- Village
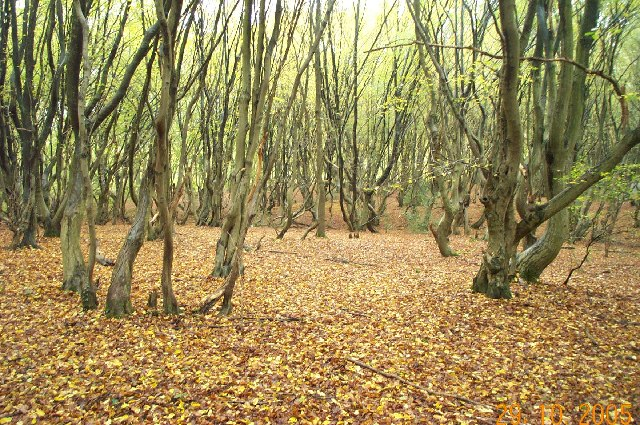
- Bricket Wood Common south of the village

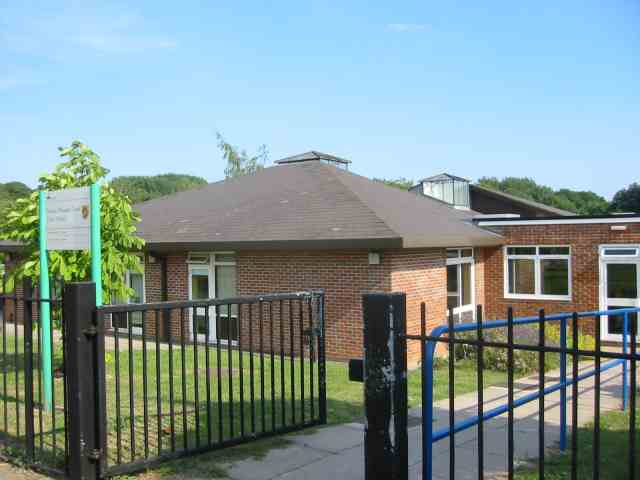
- Mount Pleasant Lane JMI School

- Location within Hertfordshire
- Population: 4,095 (2001)
- OS grid reference: TL135025
- Civil parish: St Stephen
- District: St Albans
- Shire county: Hertfordshire
- Region: East
- Country: England
- Sovereign state: United Kingdom
- Post town: ST ALBANS
- Postcode district: AL2
- Dialling code: 01923
- Police: Hertfordshire
- Fire: Hertfordshire
- Ambulance: East of England
- UK Parliament: St Albans

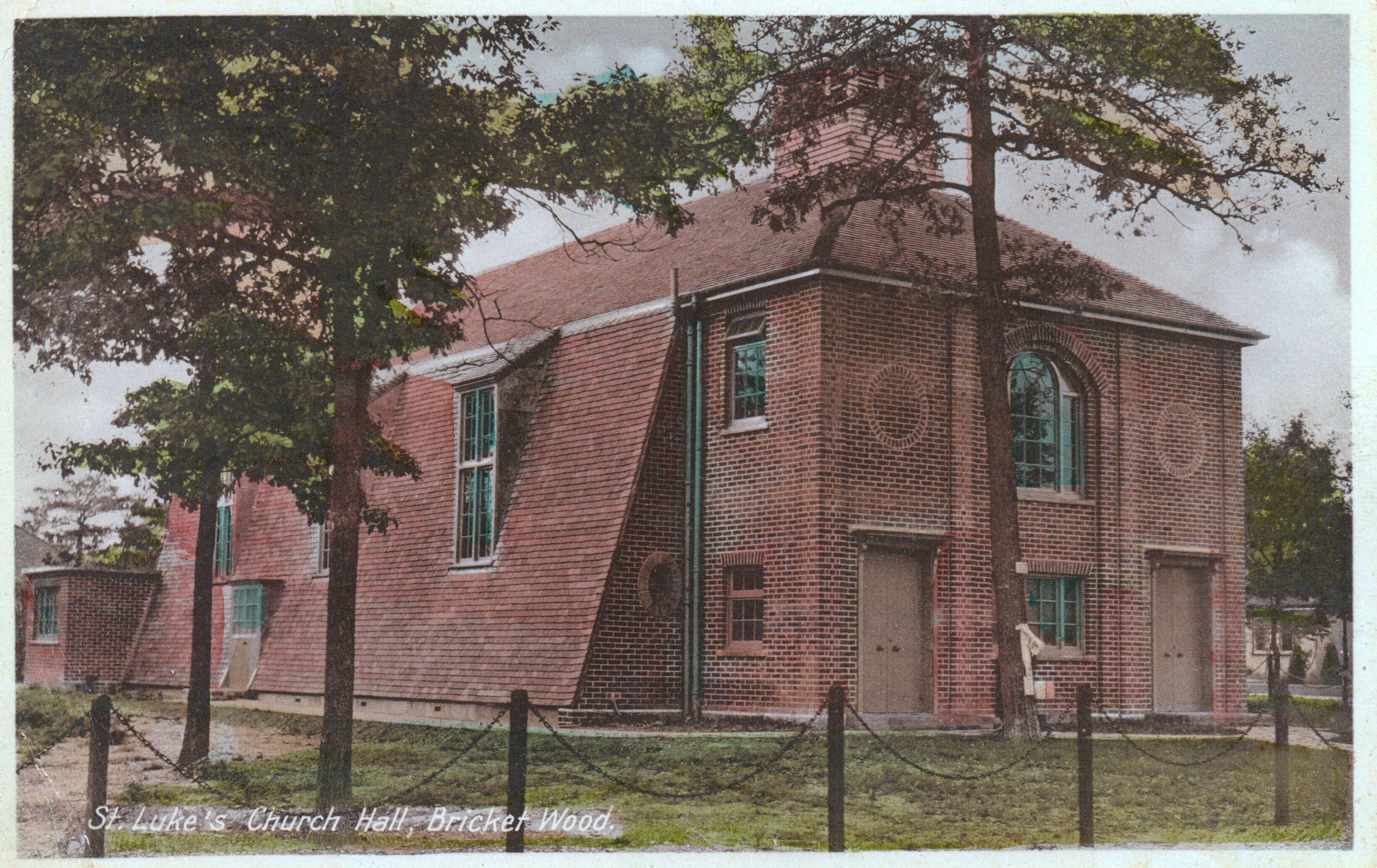
St Luke's Church, modelled on an upside down Noah's Ark

Bricket Wood is a village in the county of Hertfordshire, England, 4.2 miles (6.8 km) south of St Albans city centre (though in the city's contiguous built-up area) and 4.2 miles (6.8 km) north-northeast of Watford.

== History ==
The area of Bricket Wood was mostly occupied by farmers until Bricket Wood railway station was built in 1861. In 1889, brothers Henry Gray and William Gray bought up land in the area and built Woodside Retreat Fairground. The fairground attracted hordes of visitors to the area from London and nearby towns and a small village developed around the station. In 1923, a rival fairground named Joyland was built nearby by R.B Christmas. Both resorts were closed in 1929, and Christmas used his leftover land for building bungalows.

During the 1930s, the area became popular with naturists after Charles Macaskie set up the naturist camp Spielplatz on the outskirts of the village. Naturists bought up plots of land on the edge of the village and built their own communities, which at first did not have electricity or running water. The village also began to attract Wiccans after Gerald Gardner set up the Bricket Wood coven.

During the 1950s, housing estates were built for employees of aviation company Handley Page, who had a plant at nearby Radlett. More estates then followed, aimed at commuters desiring housing near the Green Belt with convenient access to London.

== Civil organisation and notable buildings ==
Bricket Wood is in the civil parish of St. Stephen, part of the St Albans district which shares provision of local government services with Hertfordshire County Council.

St Luke's Church is the Anglican place of worship. The local primary school is Mount Pleasant Lane, situated in grounds that include a small pond.

Close to the village stands Hanstead House, built by Sir David Yule in 1925, who is buried in the grounds. It formerly operated as the Hanstead Stud, breeding Arab horses, as the UK campus of the Worldwide Church of God's Ambassador College, and as a corporate training centre. In 2022 it was converted into luxury apartments.

== Transport ==
Bricket Wood railway station is served by a West Midlands Trains stopping service on the Abbey Line that runs between St Albans Abbey and Watford Junction; both towns are three stops away with a frequent service. The station building was taken into private ownership in 2018, and is being developed into a sympathetic recreation of its original appearance. It will be a village hub and meeting room, as well as a station.

== Morris Dancing ==
The village is home to the Morris Dancing team, Wicket Brood Border Morris.

== Common ==
Bricket Wood Common is a 70-hectare (170-acre) Site of Special Scientific Interest.

== Notable residents ==
- Frank Turner (1922–2010), three-time Olympic gymnast, died at his home in the village.
- Ralph Coates, footballer who played for England and Tottenham Hotspur, lived in the village until his death in December 2010.
