= Garston railway station (Hertfordshire) =

Railway station in Hertfordshire, England

Coordinates: 51.687°N 0.382°W

Garston
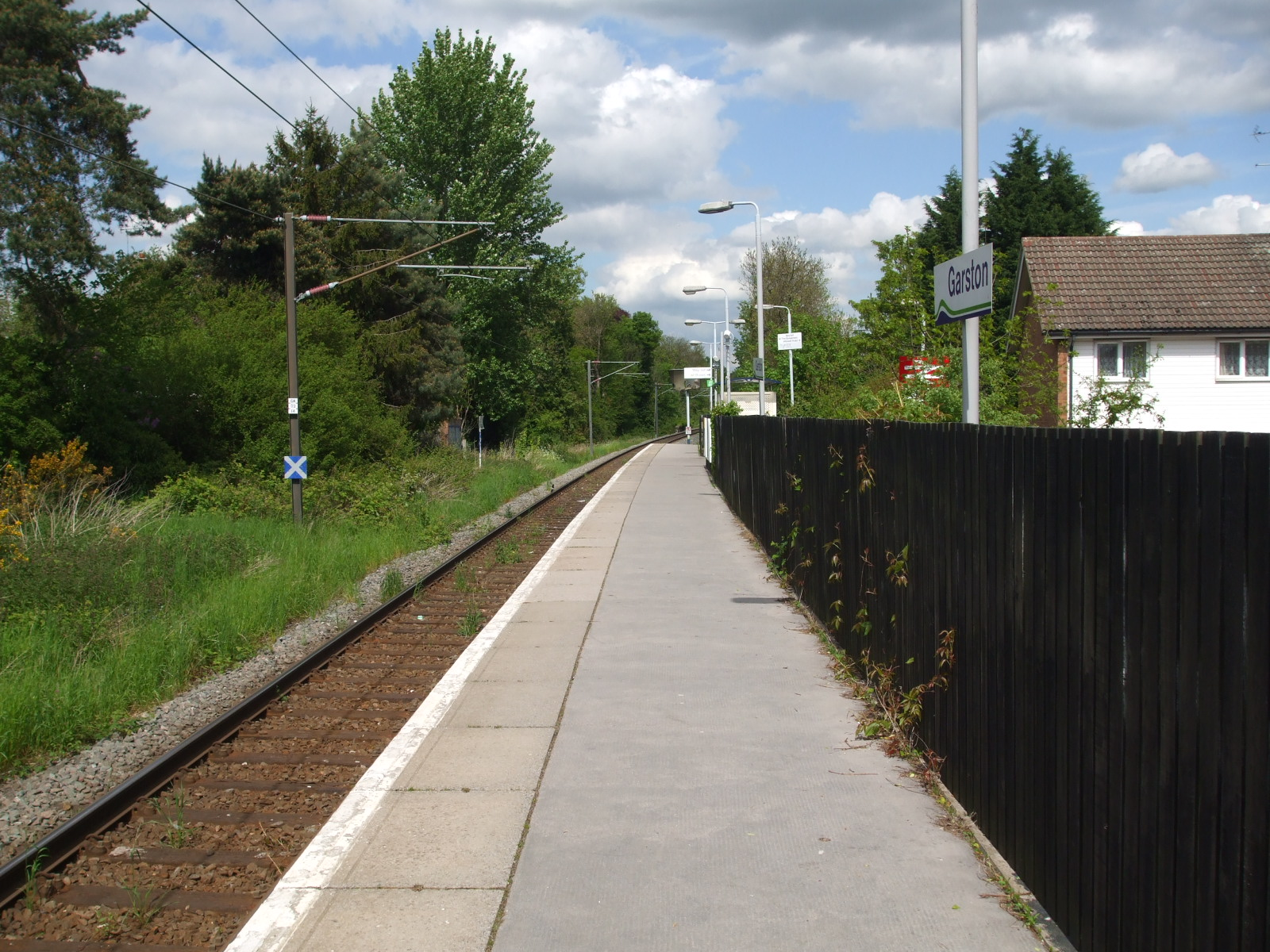

General information
- Location: Garston, Watford; England
- Grid reference: TQ119999
- Managed by: London Northwestern Railway
- Platforms: 1

Other information
- Station code: GSN
- Classification: DfT category F2

Key dates
- 7 February 1966: Opened

Passengers
- 2020/21: ▼8,796
- 2021/22: ▲18,412
- 2022/23: ▲41,946
- 2023/24: ▲45,030
- 2024/25: ▲53,142
Location
Notes
- Passenger statistics from the Office of Rail and Road

Garston railway station serves the Garston area of Watford in Hertfordshire, England. It is the third station on the Abbey Line after Watford Junction and Watford North. The station and all trains serving it are operated by London Northwestern Railway.

Like all the other stations on the branch, Garston is an unstaffed railway halt. At opening by British Rail in 1966 it was a welcome addition to a branch which was otherwise being heavily rationalised.

== History ==
The station was opened by the Mayor of Watford on 7 February 1966. It consisted of just a short wooden platform, and was probably the first new station (as opposed to a relocation) in Great Britain following the Beeching Report of 1963, which led to the closure of many stations.

In 2010 the station was improved with new signage, a new shelter, new lighting & artwork by children from Berry Grove Primary School (now The Grove Academy) - a local school located at the end of Fourth Avenue.

== Services ==
All services at Garston are operated by London Northwestern Railway using Class 350 EMUs.

The typical off-peak service on all days of the week is one train per hour in each direction between Watford Junction and St Albans Abbey. This is increased to a train approximately every 45 minutes in each direction during the peak hours.

Preceding station	National Rail	Following station
Watford North towards Watford Junction	London Northwestern Railway Abbey Line	Bricket Wood towards St Albans Abbey

== Connections ==
The station is served by the Uno route 635 which provides connections to Watford, Hatfield, Stevenage and Hitchin.

== Future ==
Possible changes on the line include new means of buying tickets, and the restoration of a passing loop at Bricket Wood, which would facilitate a 30-minute train service. In October 2009 the Department for Transport announced plans to convert the line to light rail.
