= How Wood railway station =

Railway station in Hertfordshire, England

Coordinates: 51.7175°N 0.3448°W

How Wood
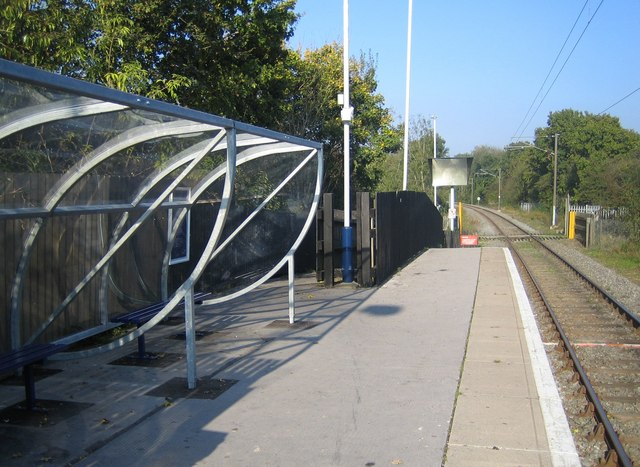

General information
- Location: How Wood, St. Albans; England
- Grid reference: TL144033
- Manager: London Northwestern Railway
- Platforms: 1

Other information
- Station code: HWW
- Classification: DfT category F2

History
- Opened: 22 October 1988
- Original company: British Rail

Passengers
- 2021/22: ▲10,246
- 2022/23: ▲20,046
- 2023/24: ▲25,150
- 2024/25: ▲29,104
- 2025/26: ▲39,450
Location
Notes
- Passenger statistics from the Office of Rail and Road

How Wood railway station is in the village of How Wood, Hertfordshire, England. It is the fourth station on the Abbey Line, 4 1/2 miles (7.2 km) from Watford Junction. Like all the other stations on the branch (except Watford Junction), it is a simple unstaffed halt.

The station was opened by British Rail in October 1988, to coincide with the overhead electrification of the line, but lies on the original site of Park Street & Frogmore railway station which opened in 1858 and relocated from the site sometime before the 1890s.

== Services ==
All services at How Wood are operated by London Northwestern Railway using Class 350 EMUs.

The typical off-peak service on all days of the week is one train per hour in each direction between Watford Junction and St Albans Abbey. This is increased to a train approximately every 45 minutes in each direction during the peak hours.

Preceding station	National Rail	Following station
Bricket Wood towards Watford Junction	London Northwestern Railway Abbey Line	Park Street towards St Albans Abbey

== Future ==
In November 2007 responsibility for the branch line, including How Wood, passed from Silverlink trains to Govia London Midland trains. Installation of Oyster Card readers on the stations along the branch is a possibility, although there are other ticketing options too.

Restoration of the crossing loop at Bricket Wood is being considered by the local authorities and Network Rail, which would facilitate trains running every 30 minutes.
