= Abbey Line =

Railway line in Hertfordshire, England

Coordinates: 51.704°N 0.361°W

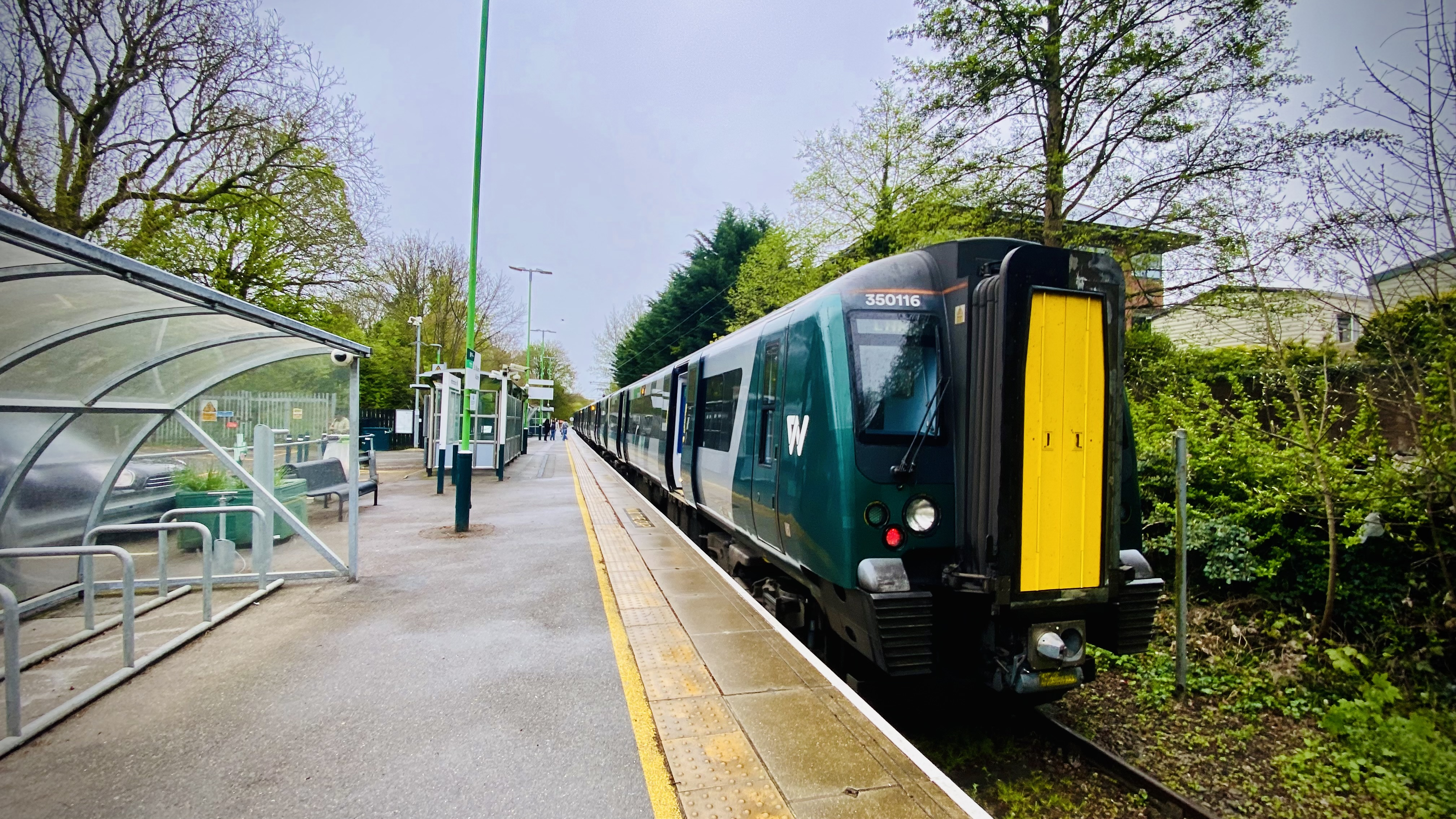
- A London Northwestern Railway EMU at St Albans Abbey in 2026

Overview
- Status: Operational
- Owner: Network Rail
- Locale: Hertfordshire
- Termini: Watford Junction; St Albans Abbey
- Stations: 7

Service
- Type: Heavy rail
- System: National Rail
- Operator: London Northwestern Railway
- Rolling stock: Class 350

History
- Opened: 5 May 1858

Technical
- Line length: 6 mi 45 ch (10.6 km)
- Track gauge: 4 ft 8 1/2 in (1,435 mm) standard gauge
- Electrification: 25 kV AC OHLE
- Operating speed: 50 mph (80 km/h) maximum
Route map
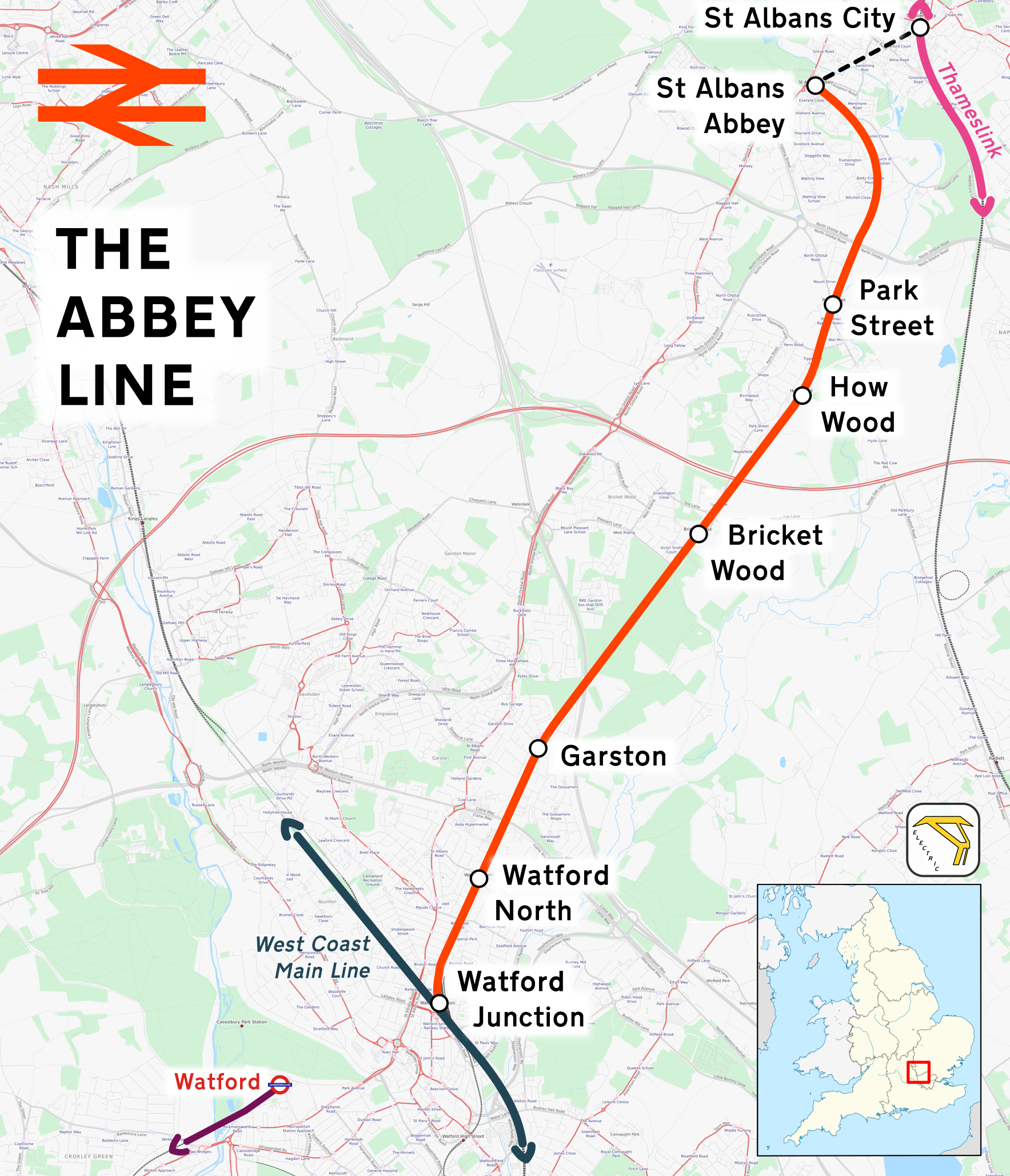
(Click to expand)

The Abbey Line, also known as the St Albans Abbey branch line, informally the Abbey Flyer, is a railway line from Watford Junction to St Albans Abbey. The 6 1/2-mile (10.5 km) route passes through town and countryside in the county of Hertfordshire, just outside the boundaries of the Oyster Card and London fare zones. Its northern terminus, St Albans Abbey, is located in the south of the city, around 3/4 mile (1.2 km) away from the larger St Albans City station on the Midland Main Line. It is a semi-rural line and, due to its single-track operation, service frequencies are limited. The service is sometimes referred to locally as the Abbey Flyer.

== History ==
London and North Western Railway (St. Alban's, Luton and Dunstable Branch) Act 1847
- Act of Parliament
- Parliament of the United Kingdom
- Long title: An Act to empower the London and North-western Railway Company to make a Railway from the London and North-western Railway near Watford to St. Albans, Luton, and Dunstable.
- Citation: 10 & 11 Vict. c. cxxxii

Dates
- Royal assent: 9 July 1847

Text of statute as originally enacted

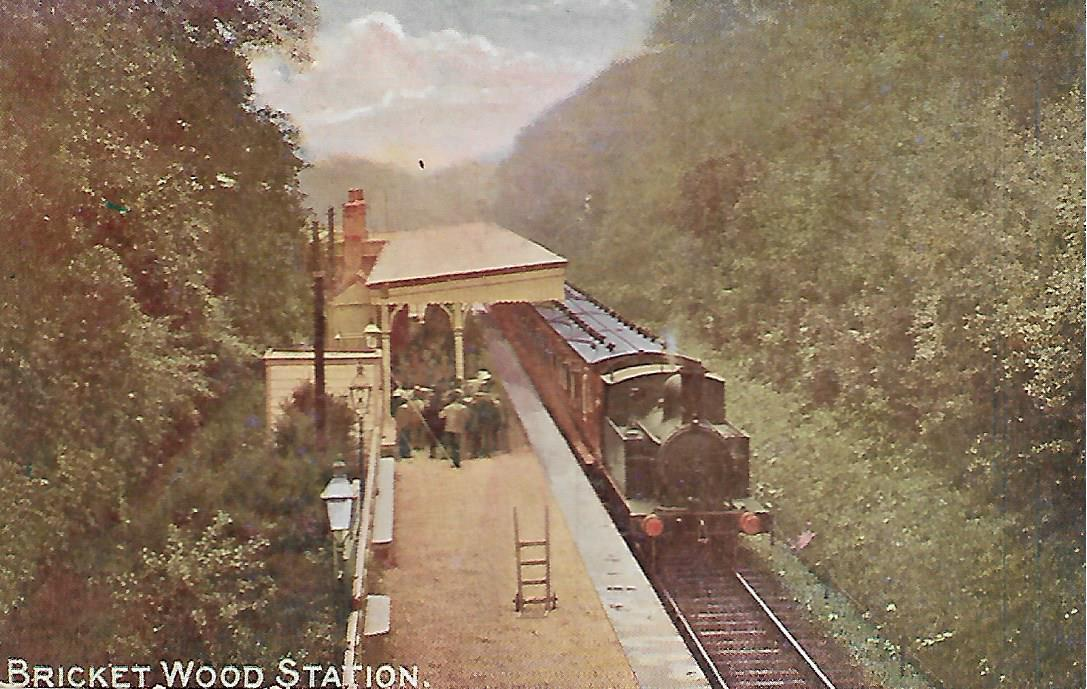
A postcard view of Bricket Wood station

The line was authorised by the London and North Western Railway (St. Alban's, Luton and Dunstable Branch) Act 1847 (10 & 11 Vict. c. cxxxii) opened by the London and North Western Railway (LNWR) on 5 May 1858 and was the first railway to reach St Albans.

Originally, there were two intermediate stations:

- Bricket Wood
- Park Street

In 1910, a station at Callowland opened, which is now known as Watford North.

In 1924, the eastern terminus became known as St Albans Abbey to distinguish it from the Midland Railway main line station at St Albans City, which opened in 1868. The LNWR station was also served by a branch of the Great Northern Railway from Hatfield.

A sixth station was added at Garston in 1966 and a seventh at How Wood in 1988, to coincide with the electrification of the route at 25 kV AC overhead.

=== Past connections ===
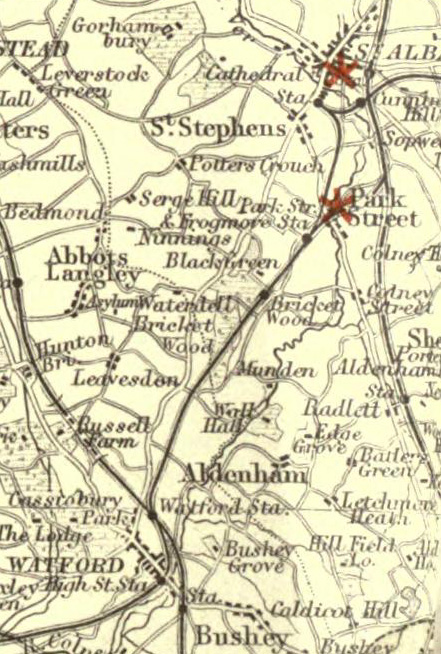
A map from 1902 showing the route of the Abbey Line, with its lost connection to the Midland Main Line

The line was built in its current form, as a branch from Watford to St. Albans. However, the line was at times connected to two other lines. One, the Hatfield and St Albans Railway, opened in 1865 from St. Albans Abbey station to the East Coast Main Line at Hatfield. Mostly a local route, the construction of the Midland Main Line ensured that it never became popular with the critical market of passengers to London. It closed to passengers in 1951, as part of a cutback of minor routes after the war. The whole route closed to goods in 1964, although a short stub at the Hatfield end lasted until 1968.

During construction of the Midland Main Line in the 1860s, a branch was laid from the Abbey Line at the original site of Park Street & Frogmore station (now the site of How Wood station) to the Midland Railway at the later site of Napsbury station to carry building materials. Never used by passenger services, Ordnance Survey maps indicate it closed between 1871 and 1896, although the embankment in Park Street and the west abutment of the bridge over Watling Street remain visible. The bridge over the River Ver just east of Watling Street was still intact in 2001. As part of a cost-cutting plan in the 1980s, British Rail examined reopening this, with the aim of diverting the branch to the City station and selling off the valuable Abbey station site.

== The line today ==
=== Operations ===
Passenger services are operated by London Northwestern Railway.

Stations on the branch are unstaffed. Some have ticket machines; otherwise tickets must be bought on the train. Passengers starting their journey at Watford Junction, which is staffed, must have a valid ticket prior to boarding the train, in compliance with National Rail conditions of carriage.

The Abbey line is part of the Network Rail Strategic Route 18, SRS 18.10 and is classified as a Rural line.

=== Infrastructure ===
The line is single track and is electrified at 25 kV AC using overhead line equipment. It has a loading gauge of W6 and a maximum line speed of 50 mph (80 km/h).

=== Rolling stock ===
The service is operated using electric multiple units. Services were previously operated using Class 313 units, at times substituted by a Class 150 diesel multiple unit (more commonly in the past). For several years, London Northwestern Railway ran services with a single Class 319 train, which was acquired in September 2015 by London Midland as part of a set of trains from Thameslink to replace Class 321 units (which had in turn been acquired by Abellio ScotRail to operate on Glasgow's suburban rail network). In May 2021, the Class 319 was replaced by a single Class 350 unit.

Class	Image	Type	Top speed		Number	Cars per unit	Built
Class	Image	Type	mph	km/h	Number	Cars per unit	Built
Class 350		EMU	110	177	4	4	2004-14

=== Signalling ===
Signalling is under One Train Working (without Train staff) rules, where only one train is allowed on the line at a time. Trains can be moved into Watford Junction yard by a manual ground frame there. On 28 October 2005 its incorrect operation caused an incident with a train not in passenger service.

There is an automatic level crossing outside Watford North. This is operated by a manual plunger for trains heading towards St Albans, and by a treadle towards Watford Junction.

== Future developments ==
Since 1995 the Abbey Flyer Users Group (ABFLY) has been campaigning to secure the future of the line and encourage its growth. The Abbey line was designated by the Strategic Rail Authority as a community rail line in July 2005, one of seven pilots under the Community Rail Development Strategy.

Hertfordshire County Council is considering proposals to develop an east–west transit system, Hertfordshire Essex Rapid Transit (HERT) across the central belt of Hertfordshire. The project is not confirmed and remains unfunded, but it is possible that the scheme will incorporate the Abbey Line. HERT vehicles have not been specified, but proposals indicate that zero-emission passenger vehicles are being considered, including trams, guided busways, or trackless trams.

=== Previous proposals ===
In 2004 a proposal was made by Transport for London for a London Regional Rail Authority to take control over some rail services that extended out of Greater London, including the branch line.

In October 2009 Secretary of State for Transport Lord Adonis announced a plan to increase frequency on the line by allowing Hertfordshire County Council to lease the line from Network Rail and converting it to light rail from 2011. It was hoped that this would be possible for the same amount of subsidy the line received, as the new infrastructure required, such as a passing loop would be cheaper for light rail than heavy rail. Longer-term proposals envisaged extensions into Watford town centre via Clarendon Road and High Street, and St Albans city centre, possibly as far as St Albans City railway station, and possible re-instatement of the line to Hatfield.

The light rail plan was cancelled in May 2013, as it was found to be impossible to deliver the scheme within the existing heavy rail subsidy as planned and more complicated than had been expected with disputes over apportionment of ticket revenue and who was responsible for the cost of maintaining structures. Hertfordshire County Council pledged to prepare a more ambitious bid to the DfT for funding for full segregation from the national rail network and extensions on either end rather than to lease the line from Network Rail.

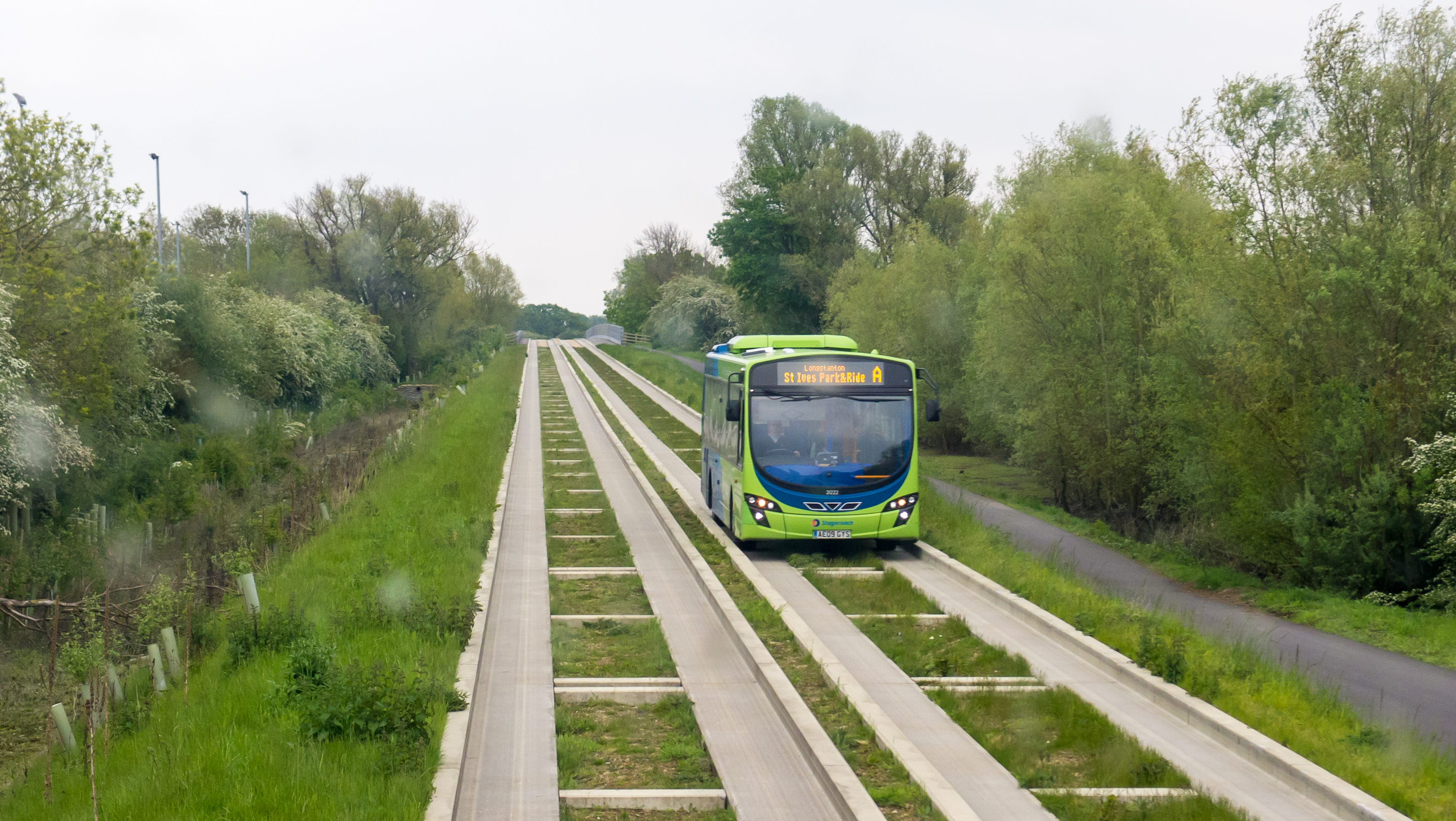
The Busway in Cambridgeshire, an example of a guided busway proposed for the Abbey line

In a Draft Rail Strategy consultation published in June 2015, Hertfordshire County Council highlighted the difficulties presented by single-track operation on the Abbey line, in particular the fact that the maximum service frequency that can be operated is one train per 45 minutes. The report notes that the service pattern makes it difficult to enable interchange connections with other rail services and to offer a "clockface" timetable that is memorable to passengers. Among the solutions evaluated by Hertfordshire are: a proposal to reopen the passing loop at Bricket Wood; running trains which skip certain stations; closing some stations; conversion of the line to light rail operation; and conversion of the line to a guided busway. The passing loop solution would enable a 30-minute service, but the report notes that there would be an additional cost of running the line with two train sets (rather than a single train, as at present), and that it would be "difficult to achieve a favourable business case". The report states that a light rail or busway solution would be quicker to implement and offer higher service frequencies, while still providing sufficient capacity, and concludes that these alternative modes would offer a stronger "business case" than heavy rail. The ABFLY campaign group has criticised the busway proposal, citing environmental concerns about replacing an electric train service with a diesel bus service and rejecting plans to replace the tracks with a concrete busway.

Other proposals considered included adding the Abbey line as a branch of the proposed extension of Crossrail to St Albans; this proposal was rejected due to the technical challenges associated with upgrading the Abbey line to accommodate Crossrail trains.

=== Passing loop ===
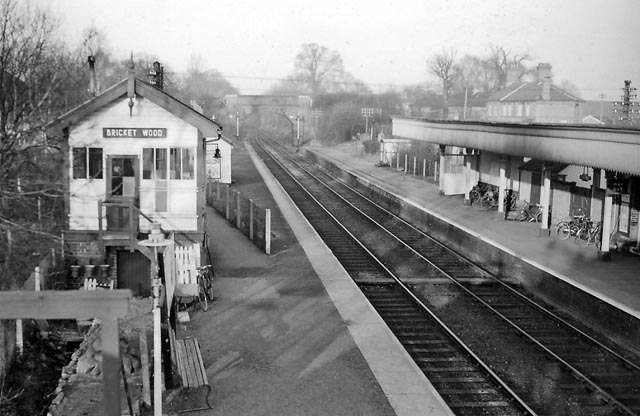
The old passing loop at Bricket Wood, proposed for re-opening to increase services

In May 2020, it was announced that £50,000 of funding from the government's Restoring Your Railway Fund would be available to enable transport planners to develop a business case around the Bricket Wood passing loop proposal. If approved, this scheme would have enabled an increase in train frequencies, as well as the introduction of a regular "clockface" timetable. In June 2022 it was announced that further funding had been refused and the passing loop scheme would not be taken forward.

=== Rolling stock ===
Upon winning the West Midlands franchise in 2017, the future operator West Midlands Trains confirmed that new trains would be bought for the Abbey line.

== See also ==
- Hatfield and St Albans Railway
- Nickey line
