= Watford Junction railway station =

Principal railway station in Hertfordshire, England

Watford Junction
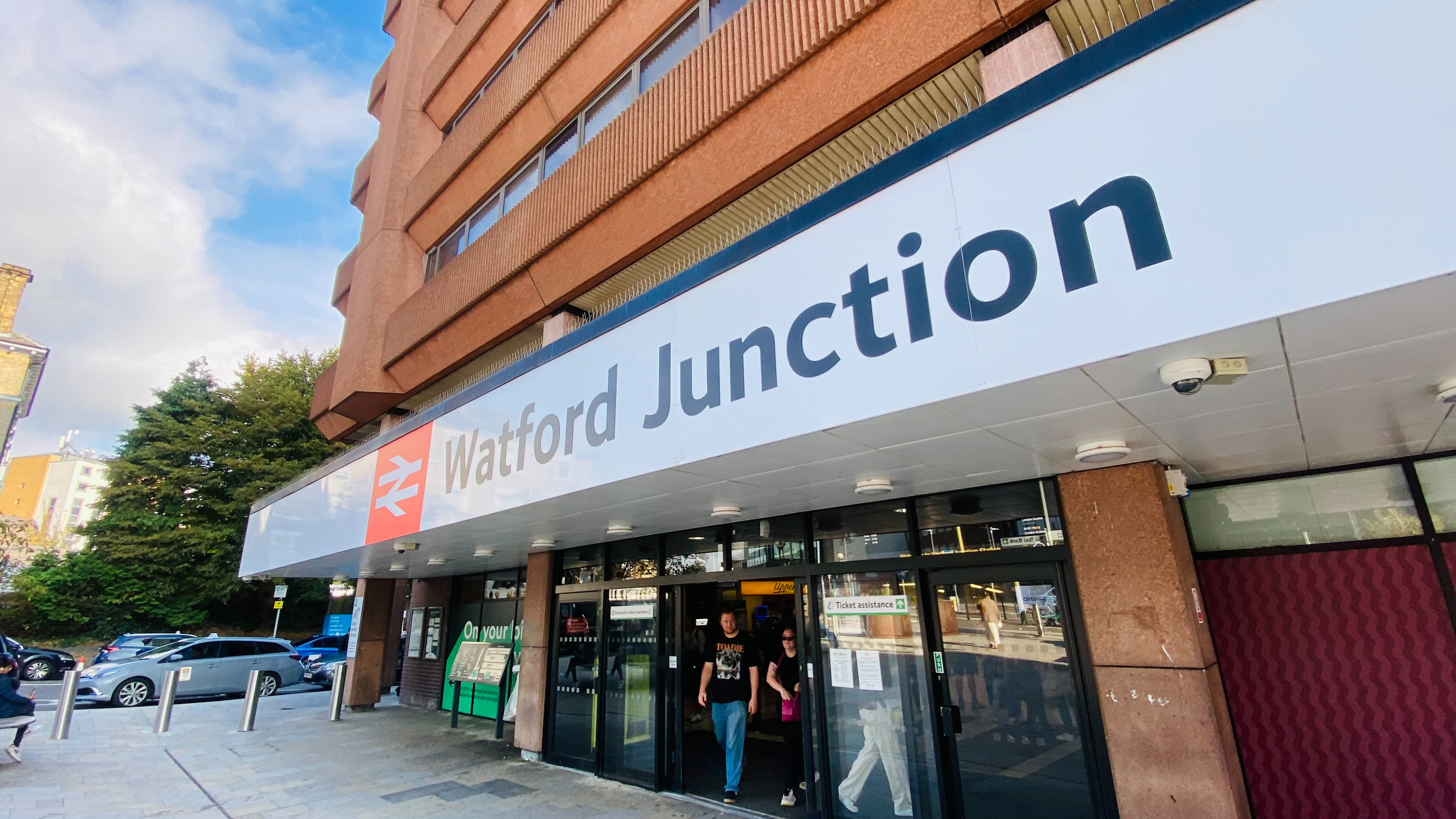
- The station's main entrance
- Interactive map of Watford Junction

General information
- Location: Watford
- Local authority: Borough of Watford
- Managed by: London Northwestern Railway
- Owner: Network Rail
- Station code: WFJ
- DfT category: B
- Number of platforms: 12 (10 in use)
- Accessible: Yes
- Fare zone: A

National Rail annual entry and exit
- 2021–22: ▲4.127 million
- Interchange: ▲0.242 million
- 2022–23: ▲5.536 million
- Interchange: ▲0.282 million
- 2023–24: ▲6.475 million
- Interchange: ▲0.332 million
- 2024–25: ▲6.940 million
- Interchange: ▲0.382 million
- 2025–26: ▲7.387 million
- Interchange: ▲0.448 million

Key dates
- 20 July 1837: First station, named Watford, opened
- 5 May 1858: Station relocated and renamed Watford Junction
- 1909: Rebuilt
- 1980s: Refurbished throughout

Other information
- External links: Departures; Facilities
- Coordinates: 51.6635°N 0.3958°W

Watford Junction is a railway station serving the town of Watford, in Hertfordshire, England. It is on the West Coast Main Line (WCML), 17 miles 34 chains (28 km) down the line from London Euston. It is also the northern terminus of the Lioness line of the London Overground, which operates via the Watford DC line to central London. The Abbey Line branch to St Albans Abbey diverges from the WCML at Watford Junction. The station is to the north of a viaduct over the Colne Valley and is immediately south of Watford Tunnel.

Journey times from Watford Junction to London range from 16 to 52 minutes, depending on the service. Trains also run to Clapham Junction and East Croydon, via the West London line. The station is a major hub for local bus services and the connecting station for buses to Warner Bros. Studio Tour London – The Making of Harry Potter.

== History ==
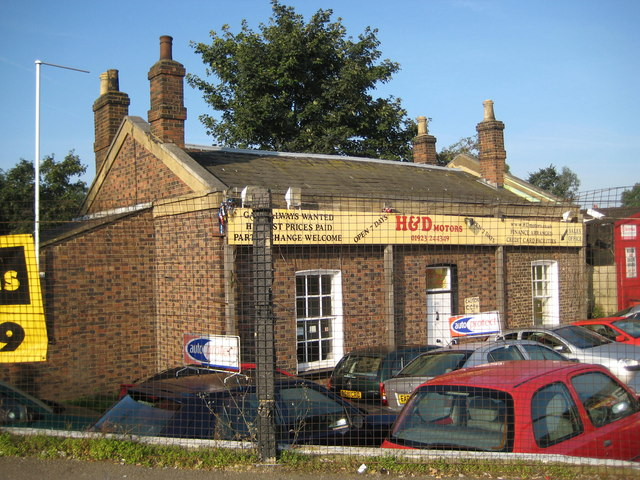
The original 1837 station

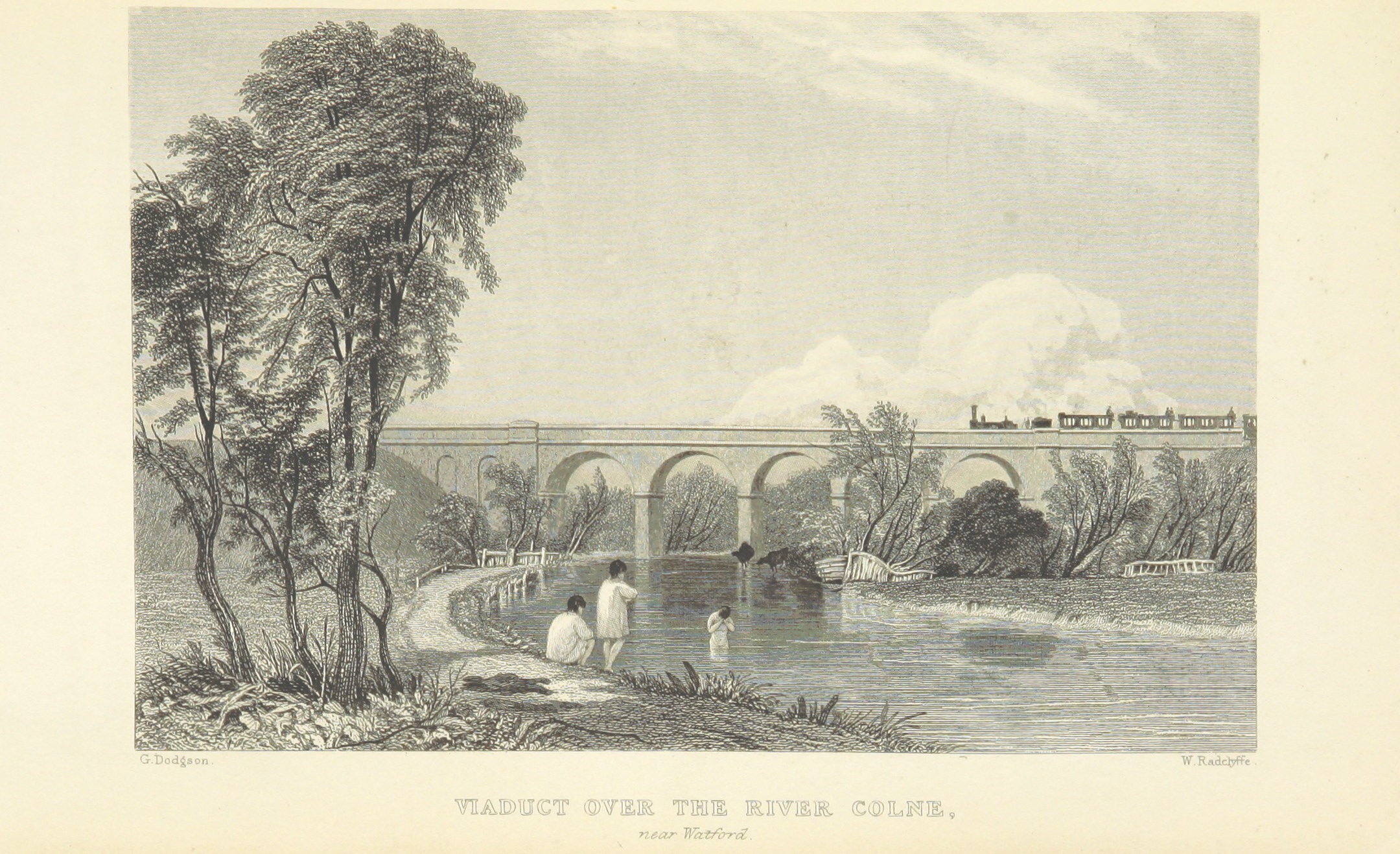
The new railway line, opened in 1837, approached Watford over the River Colne on a viaduct (Thomas Roscoe, 1839)

The first railway station to open in Watford was on the north side of St Albans Road, around 200 metres (220 yd) further up the line from the present-day station. This small, single-storey red-brick building was built in 1836–7, when the first section of the London and Birmingham Railway (L&BR) was opened between London and Boxmoor. First and second-class waiting rooms were provided at the station, as well as a departure yard, a carriage shed and engine house. The platforms, in a deep cutting, were accessed via a staircase.

In its 21 years of operation, the first station was used by members of the royal family. In the short period when the Dowager Queen Adelaide was resident at Cassiobury House (c. 1846 – c. 1849), the station was remodelled to provide a royal waiting room. It was also reportedly used by Queen Victoria and Prince Albert on a trip to visit Sir Robert Peel in November 1843, when they arrived by road from Windsor Castle to take a train to Tamworth.

The old station closed when the new, larger station opened on 5 May 1858. The new Watford Junction station was south of St Albans Road in order to accommodate the newly constructed branch line to St Albans. The junction station was rebuilt in 1909, and was extensively redeveloped in the 1980s. The Grade II-listed Old Station House still stands at 147A St Albans Road, a rare surviving example of architecture from the beginning of the railway age. Today, the building is occupied by a second-hand car dealership.

In 1862, the Watford and Rickmansworth Railway opened a route from Watford to Rickmansworth. Now mostly closed, this route began by running south and west to a more central station at Watford High Street, which remains in use.

From 1846, the L&BR was absorbed into the London and North Western Railway (LNWR) and Watford Junction was now run by this large, ambitious company. Seeking to compete with local buses and trams, the LNWR built an additional suburban line from Euston to Watford in the early years of the 20th century, known as the Watford DC line. This veered away from the main line at Bushey to loop around Watford to pass through the High Street station. A second suburban branch line was also built from High Street west towards Croxley Green to serve new housing developments in that area. Both branches were later electrified as part of this improvement plan, on the same DC three-rail system. The Rickmansworth branch was connected to the main line, via two through platforms, with a junction to the north; these platforms have since been partly built over and their remaining southern sections form part of the present DC lines terminus. At one time, tube-style trains were used on the branches to counter the low voltage caused by the lack of a substation near Rickmansworth.

The Bakerloo line was extended to Watford Junction in 1917, sharing the line north of Willesden Junction with the main line electric trains serving London Euston and Broad Street stations. However, since 1982 the line north of Harrow & Wealdstone has only been served by what is now the London Overground service from Euston station; this service uses these DC lines for its all-stations local service.

Oyster card capability was extended to this station on 11 November 2007 on both the London Overground and Southern; it was extended to London Midland services on 18 November 2007. However, the station is outside London fare zones 1–9 and special fares apply.

With the electrification of the entire West London line in the 1990s, it became practical to run services from Watford Junction to Clapham Junction, allowing passengers to cross London without changing trains. Southern operated an hourly service from Milton Keynes Central, now starting from Watford Junction, to East Croydon with connections to Brighton and Gatwick Airport.

The well-known expression, "north of Watford", is used to mean the north of England, especially a place remote from London. An alternative variant phrase, North of Watford Junction, was used with similar meaning in the past, referring to Watford Junction station. The expression reflects the station's position as the last urban stop on the main railway line out of London to the north of England. In more recent years, it has been suggested that the phrase references Watford Gap services on the M1; however, the original saying was in existence well before its opening in 1959.

=== Motive power depot ===
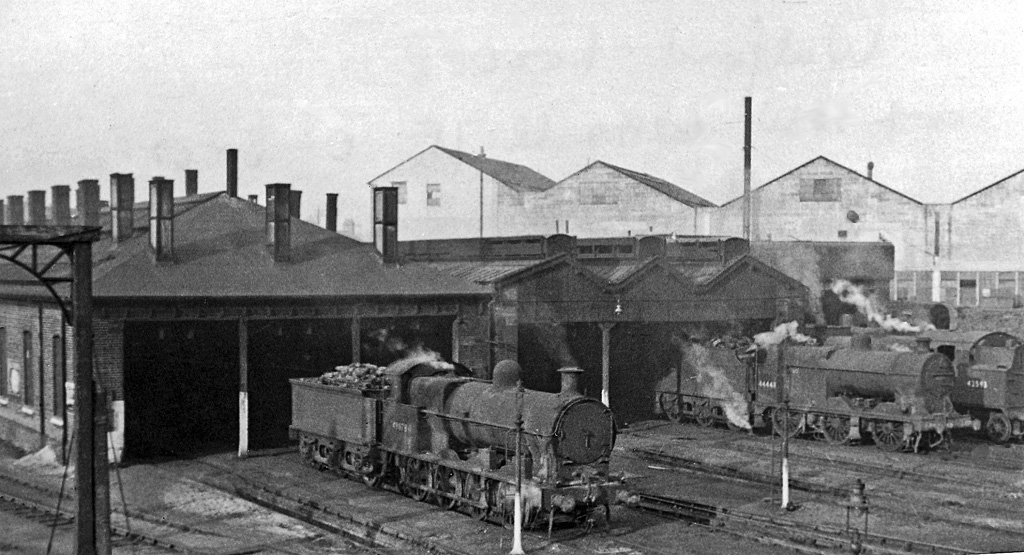
Watford locomotive depot on 27 January 1951

The LNWR built a motive power depot beside the station in 1856. It was replaced by a larger building in 1872 and was further enlarged in 1890. It was closed by British Railways in March 1965.

=== Redevelopment ===
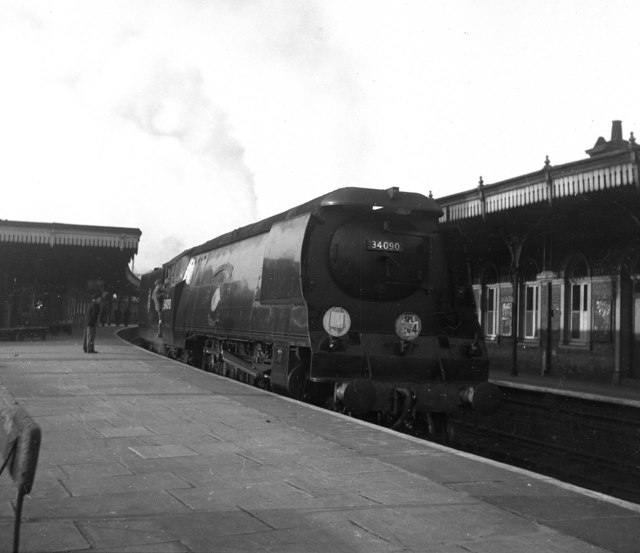
The station in 1956, before rebuilding

In 1984, the Victorian station buildings were demolished and the station was rebuilt in a Brutalist architectural style. There is a travel centre and a large office block above the station, which is occupied by the lorry and bus manufacturing company Iveco. Some 19th-century waiting rooms survived, but were finally demolished in 1987. To enlarge the car park and provide more space, the St. Albans branch line was realigned northwards, with its original platforms becoming a single terminating bay now mostly used by Southern services.

The station forecourt was extensively remodelled in 2013, when the horseshoe-shaped taxi rank was moved to the side of the building, creating a larger pedestrian area in front of the station entrance. The bus station was enlarged at the same time. Due to problems with the road layout, buses were unable to gain access to the bus station and there were problems with access to the relocated car park. London Northwestern Railway were considering revising the design.

Further redevelopment of the station and its surroundings is planned for the next ten years. They may be delayed because the redevelopment of Watford Junction has been placed within the pre-qualification pool of proposed schemes by the Department for Transport.

=== Accidents and incidents ===
==== 1954 accident ====
- 1954 Watford Junction derailment
Accident summary
Details
Date	3 February 1954
Location	Watford Junction railway station
Country	England
Line	West Coast Main Line
Operator	British Railways
Incident type	Derailment
Cause	Broken rail
Statistics
Trains	2
Injured	15

On 3 February 1954, an express passenger train became derailed in Watford Tunnel due to a broken rail. The last three carriages separated from the train as it entered the station with one ending up on the platform. A passing express passenger train grazed the wreckage, but only received minor damage. Fifteen people were injured.

==== 1962 accident ====
- 1962 Watford Junction Accident
Accident summary
Details
Date	15 October 1962
Location	Between Watford Junction and Watford High Street
Country	United Kingdom

On 16 October 1962, between Watford Junction and Watford High Street, a local passenger train running on the DC line to Euston collided with the rear of a stationary Bakerloo line train heading for Elephant & Castle. In fog, the driver of the Euston train passed a danger signal without stopping. This signal was provided with a subsidiary signal, which authorised a train to proceed with caution, providing that it had first stopped at the signal. The driver telephoned the signal box for permission to proceed. The collision occurred about 400 yards (370 m) after the signal, at a speed of between 10 and 15 mph (16 and 24 km/h). Most of the damage occurred to the rear two cars of the seven-car Bakerloo train, and seven passengers were injured.

==== 1975 accident ====
- 1975 Watford Junction rail crash
Accident summary
Details
Date	23 January 1975; 23:30
Location	South of Watford Junction
Country	England
Line	West Coast Main Line
Operator	British Rail
Cause	Obstruction on line
Statistics
Trains	2
Deaths	1
Injured	11

On 23 January 1975, an express train from Manchester to Euston derailed just south of Watford Junction after striking some stillages that had fallen onto the track. It then collided with a sleeper service from Euston to Glasgow. The driver of the Manchester train was killed, and eight passengers and three railway staff were injured. The stillages had fallen from a Ford company goods train, conveying car parts from Dagenham to Halewood, that had passed the station a few minutes earlier. Although the wagons of the goods train were sealed on departure from Dagenham, three were found to have open doors when the train was inspected after the accident. The official inquiry ruled that the doors had been forced by thieves or vandals, probably when the train was standing at Gospel Oak.

==== 1996 accident ====
In August 1996, a Class 321 electric multiple unit (EMU) operated by Network SouthEast, passed a signal at danger. An empty train of the same class collided with the stationary passenger train, approximately 700 metres (770 yd) south of the station.

==== 2014 incident ====
On 26 October 2014, a Class 350 EMU on the 06:42 service from Milton Keynes Central to London Euston, operated by London Midland, struck the door of a lineside equipment cabinet and suffered damage to a set of doors. No-one was killed or injured. The RAIB investigated the incident, and concluded that the lineside cabinet door had not been properly secured during maintenance work the previous night. The investigation also noted that the maintenance crew were likely suffering from fatigue due to a pattern of consistent night-shift work, regular overtime and short-term sleep deprivation.

==== 2016 accident ====
On 16 September 2016, Class 350 EMU 350 264 collided with a landslide, caused by heavy rain the previous night, at the entrance of the Watford Tunnel and derailed. Unit 350 233 then collided with the derailed train. Two injuries were reported and trains were disrupted for three days.

== Platforms ==
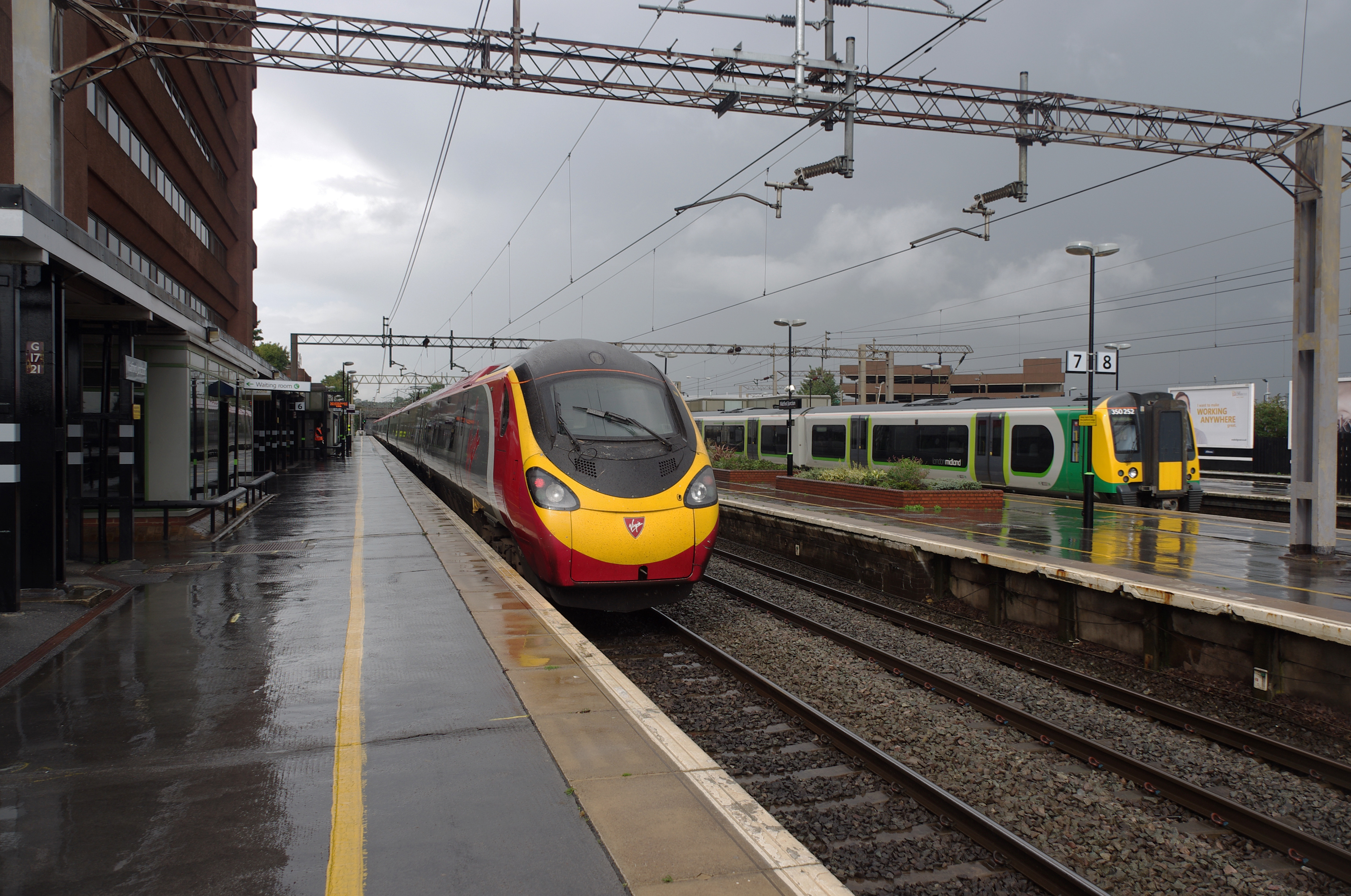
Fast and slow lines at Watford Junction: a Virgin Trains Euston-Wolverhampton service and a London Midland stopping service

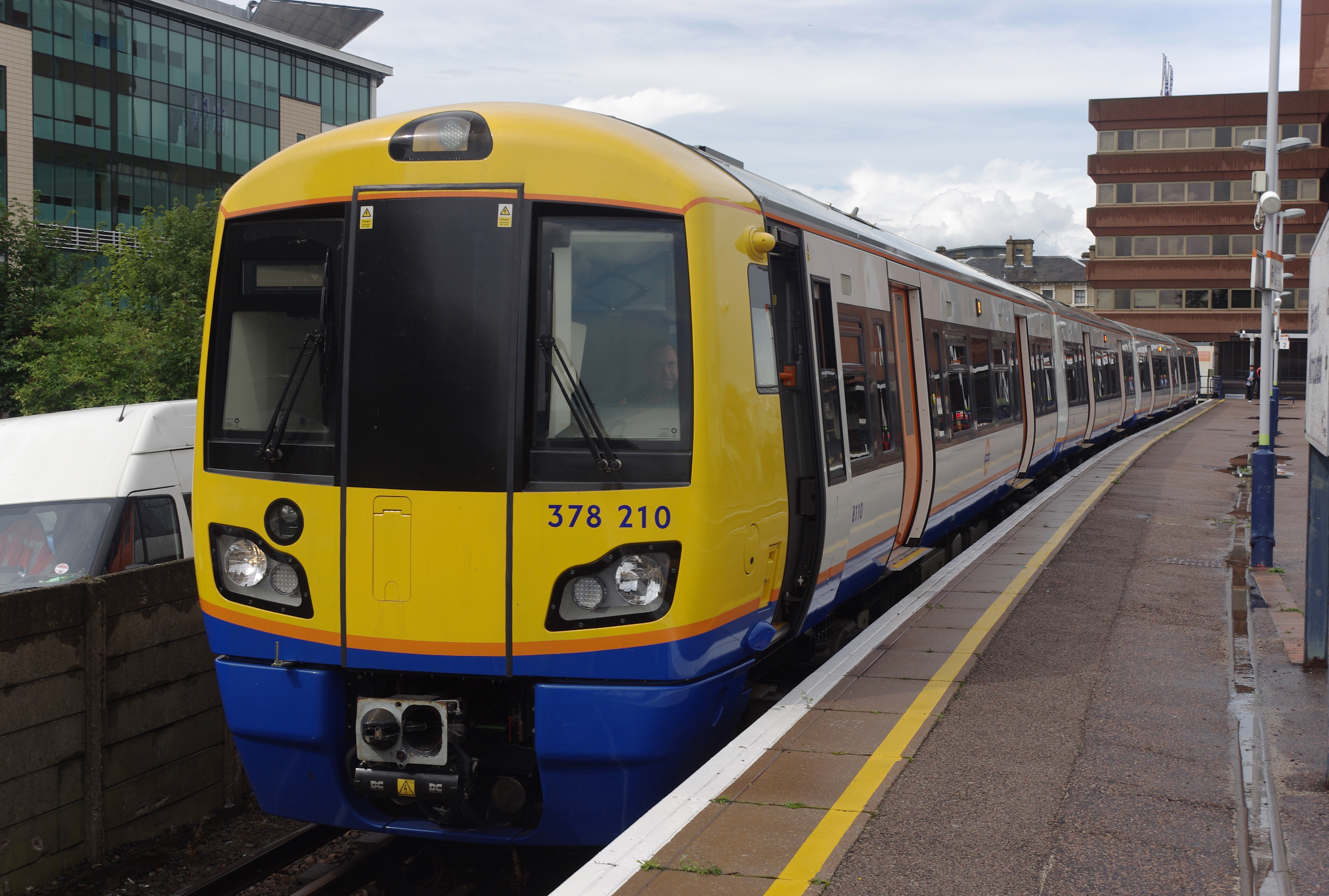
The station is the northern terminus of the Lioness line

The platforms are used currently as follows:

- 1–4: Bay platforms for the four London Overground services Lioness line to Euston, calling at all stations
- 5: Disused; it was used by Bakerloo line services of the London Underground, but its use was discontinued on 16 September 1982
- 6 (down fast): Avanti West Coast services to Birmingham New Street and London Northwestern Railway services
- 7 (up fast): London Northwestern Railway services to Euston and Avanti services to set down only
- 8 (down slow): London Northwestern Railway services
- 9 (up slow): London Northwestern Railway services to Euston; Southern services to East Croydon, via Kensington Olympia, Clapham Junction, Balham and Selhurst
- 10: Terminating Southern services to and from Kensington Olympia and Clapham Junction; there are additional terminating services to and from Balham, Selhurst, East Croydon and South Croydon on weekdays and Saturdays
- 11: London Northwestern Railway services to St Albans Abbey.

== Services ==
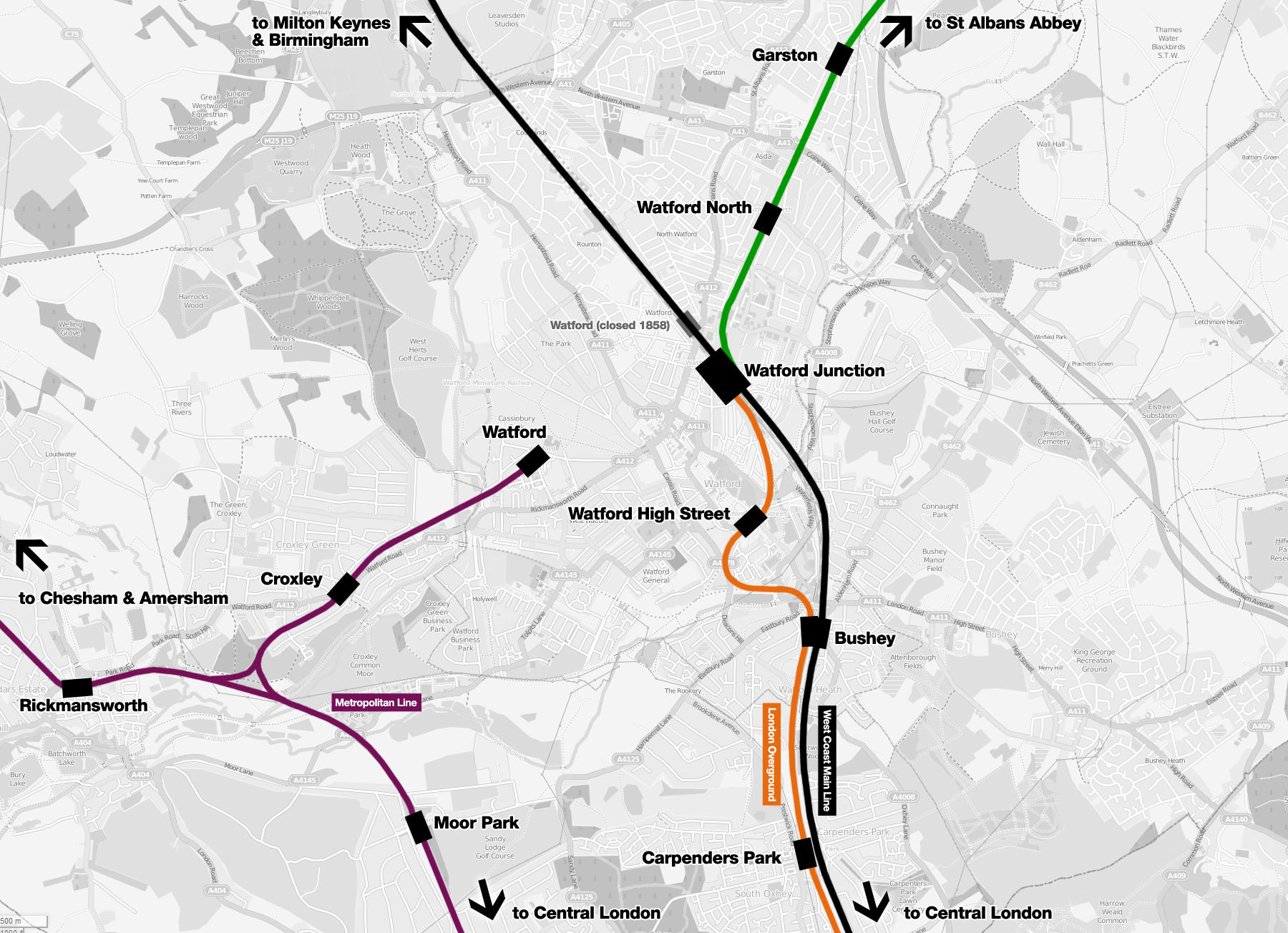
Map of railways around Watford town centre

The station is served by five train operating companies, which operate the following general off-peak services in trains per hour/day (tph/tpd):

=== Avanti West Coast ===
Avanti West Coast services at Watford Junction are operated using Class 390 Pendolino and Class 807 Evero EMUs, with Class 805 BMUs:

- 1 tph to London Euston, to set down passengers only
- 1 tph to Birmingham New Street, to pick passengers only.

=== London Northwestern Railway ===
London Northwestern Railway services at Watford Junction are operated using Class 350 and Class 730 EMUs:

- 5 tph to London Euston
- 2 tph to Tring,
- 2 tph to Milton Keynes Central
- 1 tph to Birmingham New Street, via Northampton
- 4 tp3h to St Albans Abbey.

=== London Overground ===
London Overground services at Watford Junction are operated using Class 710 EMUs:

- 4 tph to London Euston, calling at all stations on the Lioness line.

=== Southern ===
Southern services are operated using Class 377 EMUs:

- 1 tph to East Croydon, via Kensington (Olympia).

=== Caledonian Sleeper ===
The Caledonian Sleeper service cannot be used for travel to and from London Euston. The Highland Caledonian Sleeper service does not call at Watford Junction.

The Lowland Caledonian Sleeper service runs on Sunday-Friday nights:

- 1 tpd to Edinburgh Waverley and Glasgow Central.

Preceding station	National Rail	Following station
Leighton Buzzard towards Birmingham New Street	London Northwestern Railway London–Birmingham	London Euston Terminus
Kings Langley towards Milton Keynes Central	London Northwestern Railway London–Milton Keynes	Bushey towards London Euston
Hemel Hempstead towards Tring	London Northwestern Railway London–Milton Keynes	Harrow & Wealdstone towards London Euston
Watford North towards St Albans Abbey	London Northwestern Railway Abbey Line	Terminus
Terminus	Southern West London line	Harrow & Wealdstone
Milton Keynes Central	Avanti West Coast West Coast Main Line	London Euston
Carlisle	Caledonian Sleeper Lowland Caledonian Sleeper	London Euston
Preceding station	London Overground	Following station
Terminus	Lioness line Watford DC line	Watford High Street towards Euston
RailAir
Terminus	FirstBus Watford Junction-Heathrow Airport	Heathrow Central bus station
	Disused Railways	
Terminus	British Rail Rickmansworth Branch	Watford High Street
Terminus	Network SouthEast Croxley Green Branch	Watford High Street
	Former services	
Preceding station	LUL	Following station
Terminus	Bakerloo line (1917–1982)	Watford High Street towards Elephant & Castle
	Abandoned Plans	
Preceding station	LUL	Following station
Terminus	Metropolitan line Croxley Rail Link	Watford High Street towards Baker Street or Aldgate

== Bus connections ==
Local bus routes run to destinations including Heathrow Airport, Stanmore, Uxbridge and Brent Cross in London; Amersham, Chesham and High Wycombe in Buckinghamshire; Hatfield, Harpenden and Hertford in Hertfordshire; Luton Airport in Bedfordshire; and Harlow in Essex.

Since 2003, FirstBus has operated a seven-day, hourly RailAir service from Watford Junction to Heathrow Airport. The RA3 service stops at Terminal 2 and Terminal 3; passengers can reach Terminal 4 and Terminal 5 by changing onto the Elizabeth line or London Underground's Piccadilly line at no additional cost.

== Future developments ==
=== Watford Junction station area improvements ===
There are plans to upgrade the station and its access points. The scheme includes a new multi-storey car park and a new access road to the station, connecting the A412 to Colonial Way and thus to the A4008 M1 link road.

This scheme is currently in the pre-qualification pool, where to achieve funding a case for selection must be submitted. If successful, the Watford station redevelopments will be moved into the development pool where more than 24 transport projects will compete for about £600 million.

=== Previous proposals ===
==== Croxley Rail Link ====
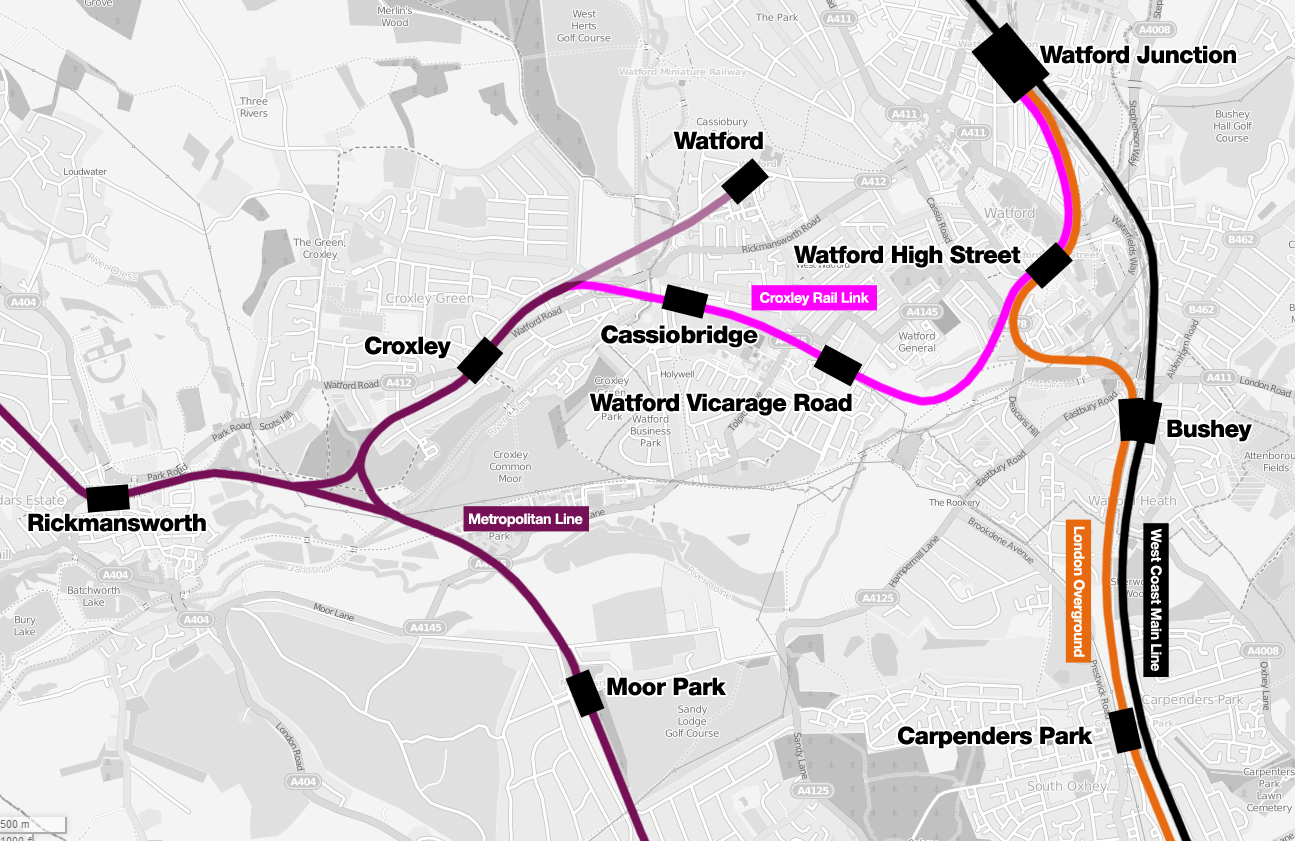
An outline map of the abandonded Croxley Rail Link scheme

The Croxley Rail Link (also called the Metropolitan Line Extension) was a scheme to extend the Watford branch of the London Underground's Metropolitan line via the disused Croxley Green branch to terminate at Watford Junction. It was planned to open to passenger service in 2020 but, due to funding issues, the project was abandoned.

==== West London Line improvement ====
The London and South East Route Utilisation Strategy document, published by Network Rail in July 2011, examined ways to increase capacity at London Euston in preparation for High Speed 2. The report recommended increased service frequency and longer trains on the West London line route from Milton Keynes Central via Watford Junction and Kensington Olympia.

==== Crossrail ====
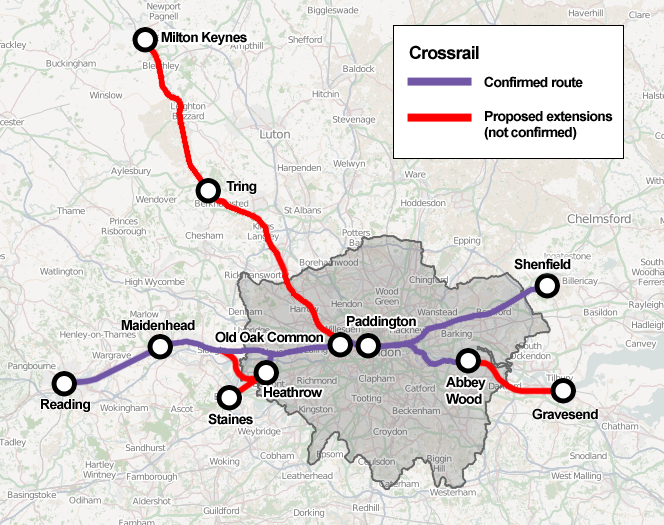
Outline map of an abandoned proposal to extend the Elizabeth Line into Hertfordshire

The 2011 London & South East Rail Utilisation Strategy report also made recommendations for the Crossrail lines which were then under construction in central London. It proposed an extension of what is now the Elizabeth line northwards into Hertfordshire, via a new tunnel near Old Oak Common and Watford Junction, connecting the Crossrail route to the West Coast Main Line. Services would have run from stations in the West End of London via Watford Junction to terminate at Tring and Milton Keynes. The new alignment would have alleviated congestion at Euston and resolved capacity constraints on the Elizabeth Line, allowing trains that terminate at London Paddington to continue east via the Hertfordshire branch. This proposal was abandoned in 2016.

==== London Euston/Watford-Aylesbury services ====
In 2008, the train operating company Chiltern Railways proposed that a new east–west direct rail route from Watford Junction to Aylesbury could be operated, via the planned Croxley Rail Link and the northern section of the London to Aylesbury Line. A 2006 report by Hertfordshire County Council mentioned the possibility of a link running as far as Amersham.

==== Hertfordshire Essex Rapid Transit ====
A Draft Rail Strategy consultation published by Hertfordshire County Council (HCC) in June 2015 considered options for reconfiguring the Abbey Line, either as a light rail route or converting it to a guided busway.

The scheme is currently being studied by HCC as the Hertfordshire Essex Rapid Transit (HERT), and could form part of an east–west transit system across the central belt of Hertfordshire. HERT vehicles have not been specified, but proposals indicate that zero-emission passenger vehicles are being considered, including trams, guided busways or trackless trams.

== See also ==
- Watford underground station on the Metropolitan line
- Abbey Line
- West Coast Main Line route modernisation.
