= Watford Stadium railway station =

Railway stop in Hertfordshire, England

Watford Stadium
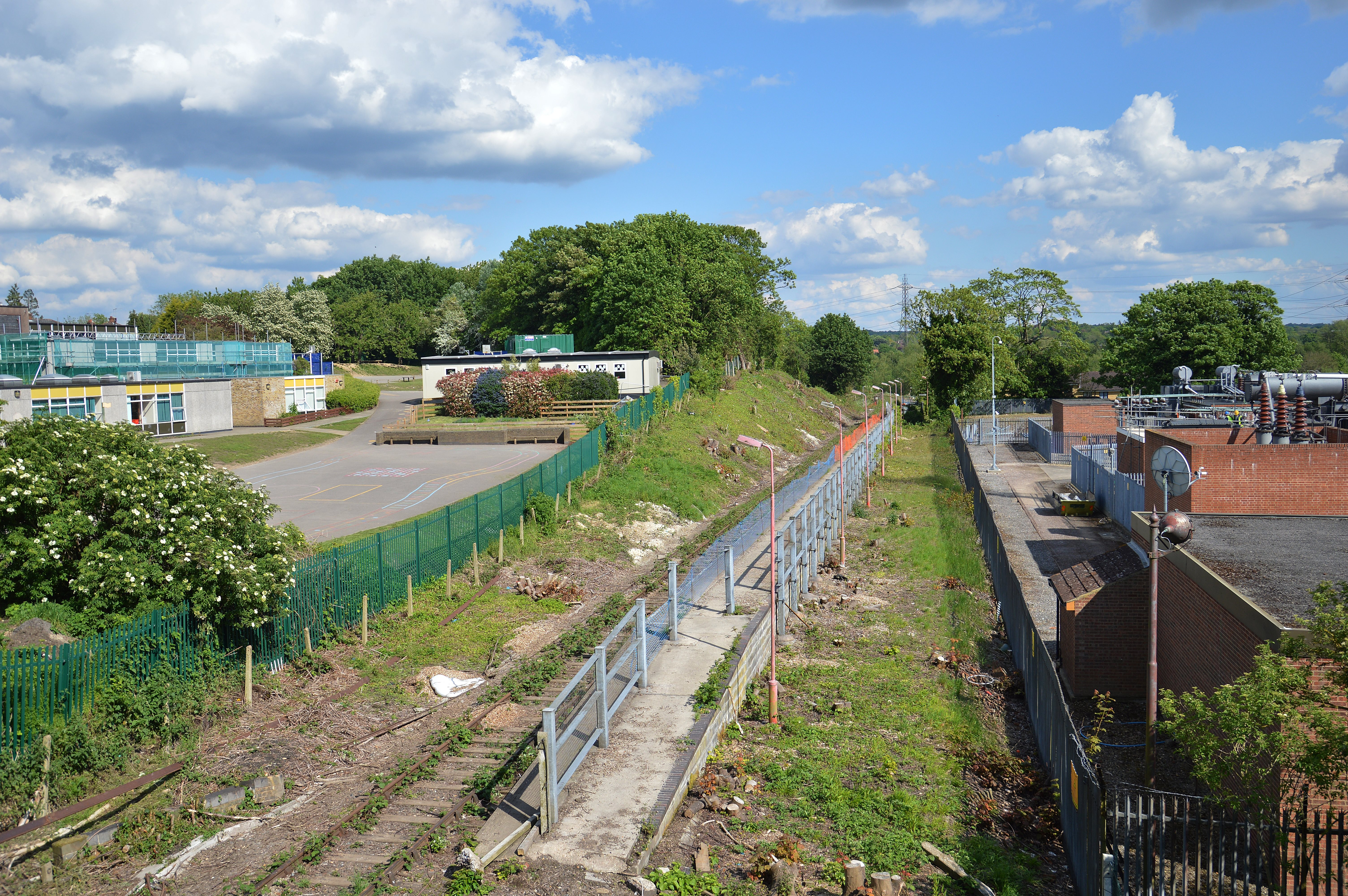
- Watford Stadium in 2014.
- Interactive map of Watford Stadium

General information
- Location: Watford
- Local authority: Borough of Watford
- Grid reference: TQ102954
- Number of platforms: 1

Railway companies
- Original company: British Rail

Key dates
- 4 December 1982: Station Opened
- ?: Last train called
- 22 March 1996: Services ceased
- 25 March 1996: Substitute bus service commenced
- 29 September 2003: Official closure and withdrawal of bus service.

Other information
- Coordinates: 51.6467°N 0.4083°W

Watford Stadium railway station is a disused railway station in Watford, Hertfordshire, England on the branch line from Watford Junction to Croxley Green. It served Vicarage Road stadium, home of Watford F.C., and was open only on match days.

== History ==
The Watford and Rickmansworth Railway opened its line between Watford Junction and Rickmansworth (Church Street) station via Watford High Street in 1862. The line was soon to be taken over by the London and North Western Railway (LNWR). In 1912, a branch line to Croxley Green was opened, with an intermediate station at Watford West. 70 years later, Watford Stadium station was created to serve Vicarage Road football ground for crowd control. Prior to this, the nearest stations available to football fans were Watford High Street and Watford Junction. A direct transport connection from the stadium would enable football officials to keep fans of "away" teams separate from Watford F.C. supporters and reduce instances of football hooliganism in Watford town centre. The station acquired the nickname of "Hooligan Halt".

Development of the station was funded jointly by the Football Trust, which contributed £50,000, Watford Borough Council (£80,000), Watford F.C. (£50,000), with the remaining £200,000 paid by British Rail. It was officially opened on 4 December 1982 by the rock musician and chairman of Watford Football Club, Elton John, and chairman of the Football Trust, Lord Aberdare. The inaugural train rolled into the station five minutes late. The station was only open on match days, with the first crowds passing through the station being Manchester United fans on the opening day.

The Croxley Green branch was temporarily closed in 1996 when a local road construction scheme severed the line and it was formally closed in 2003. However, Watford Stadium had not been used for some years prior to this, although it is not known exactly when the halt was last used. The halt was not demolished and the station furniture, including the lampposts and signage, was left in situ. Despite nature reclaiming the station, the platforms and station furniture (apart from the station nameboards) were still in place when clearance work in preparation for the Croxley Rail Link began. This was a proposal to extend the London Underground Metropolitan line to Watford Junction. The project would have involve re-opening part of the Watford and Rickmansworth line and running the Metropolitan line along this line, and the construction of two new stations. Watford Stadium would not re-open. One of the new stations, Watford Vicarage Road, to be located on the other side of the Vicarage Road bridge, would serve Watford General Hospital and the football stadium.

On 25 January 2017, the Watford Observer newspaper published an update on the Croxley Rail Link confirming work had stopped as there was an ongoing funding issue.

Preceding station	Disused railways	Following station
Watford West; Line and station closed	Network SouthEast; Croxley Green Branch	Watford; High Street; Line closed, station open
