= Vicarage Road =

Stadium in Watford, England and home of championship club Watford

Vicarage Road Stadium
- "The Vic"
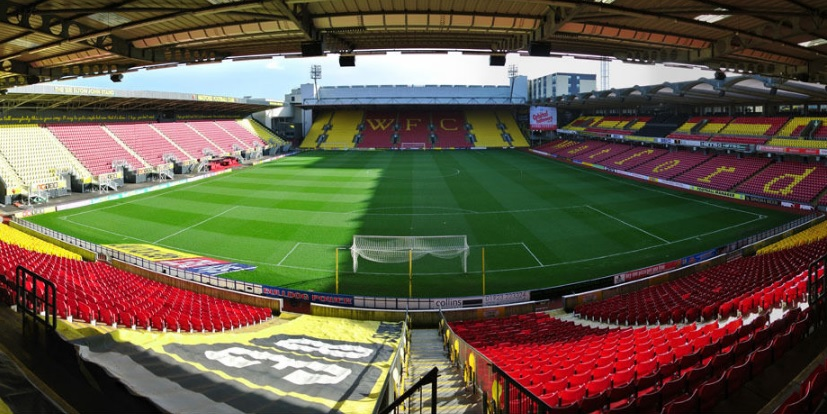
- Vicarage Road
- Interactive map of Vicarage Road Stadium
- Location: Vicarage Road; Watford; WD18 0ER
- Coordinates: 51°38′59″N 0°24′5″W
- Owner: Watford
- Capacity: 22,220
- Surface: Desso GrassMaster
- Field size: 105 by 68 metres (115 by 74 yd)

Construction
- Built: 1921
- Opened: 30 August 1921
- Renovated: 2015–2017

Tenants
- Watford (1922–present); Wealdstone (1991–1994); Saracens (1997–2013)

Vicarage Road is a stadium in Watford, England, and is the home stadium of Championship club Watford. An all-seater stadium, its current capacity is 22,200.

== History ==
It has been the home of Watford since 1922, when the club moved from Cassio Road. The ground was officially opened by Col. Charles Healey of Benskins Brewery for the visit of Millwall on 30 August 1922. In addition to being Watford's home since opening, the stadium was also home to Wealdstone F.C. between 1991 and 1993, and to rugby union side Saracens from 1997 until they moved to their new home of Copthall Stadium in north London in February 2013.

After purchasing the freehold of the stadium from Benskins in January 2002, Watford's financial situation forced them to sell and lease back the stadium later that year. However, after a campaign entitled 'Let's Buy Back The Vic' with donations coming from fans, as well as celebrity former owner Elton John donating the entire proceeds of a concert held at the venue, the club was able to repurchase the stadium in September 2004.

On 1 September 2011 it hosted England under-21s 2013 UEFA European Under-21 Championship qualification Group 8 match against Azerbaijan under-21s. The hosts thrashed the visitors 6 – 0 with braces from Craig Dawson and Henri Lansbury and single goals from Jordan Henderson and Martyn Waghorn. There were 7,738 in attendance.

== Vicarage Road Stand ==
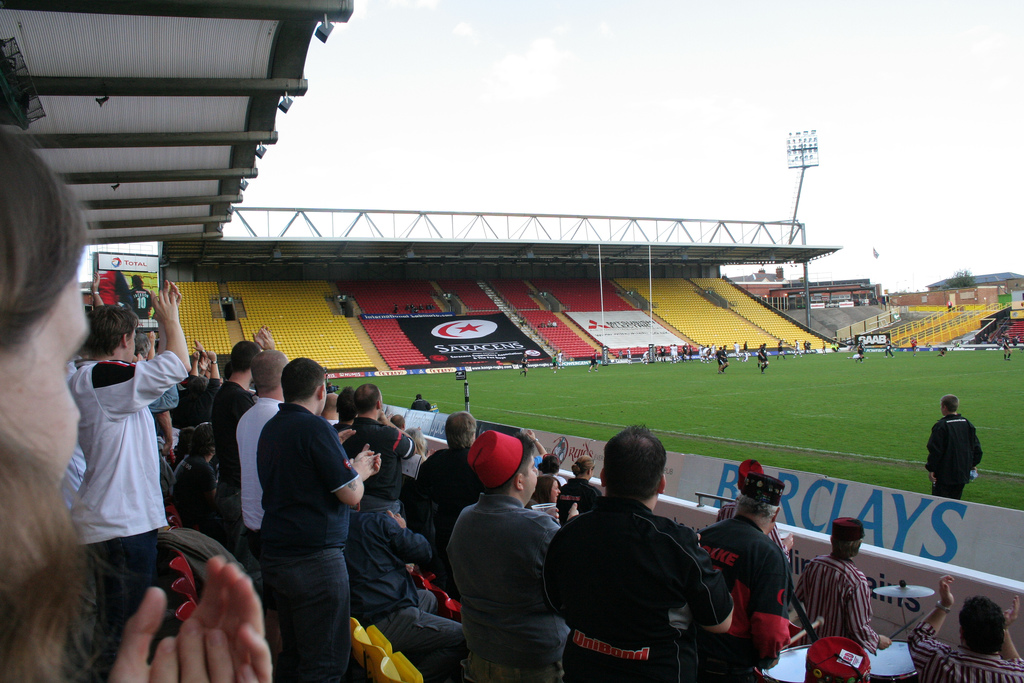
Rugby game at Vicarage Road, 2005.

The Vicarage Road Stand was built following the conclusion of the 1992–93 season. Previously an open terrace, the all-seater stand was built to comply with the Taylor Report and raise the standard of the ground. It cost £2.3 million to build and had a capacity of 5,800 people. Construction was largely funded by the £1.2m sale of Bruce Dyer in 1994.

Originally a mere earth bank when the club moved to the ground, it was gradually transformed into a conventional terrace. In 1978, an electronic scoreboard was put up, which became an iconic symbol of Watford's eighties heyday. In a display of solidarity with the home support, Graham Taylor maintained that the benches for the coaching staff and substitute on the side of the pitch would remain exposed to the elements until such time as the home end was covered.

Its final game as a terrace was a 1–0 loss to Oxford United on 8 May 1993. It opened to the public once more on 18 September 1993, with Watford defeating Notts County 3–1.

Previously the home stand, it now houses the away support. A partition was subsequently added, meaning that both home and away support could be put in the stand. Half of the stand is given to away fans, and the other half is used as the family area for home fans. It also houses wheelchair supporters of both teams. Since August 2012, the stand has been home to the Hornets Shop.

== The Rookery Stand ==
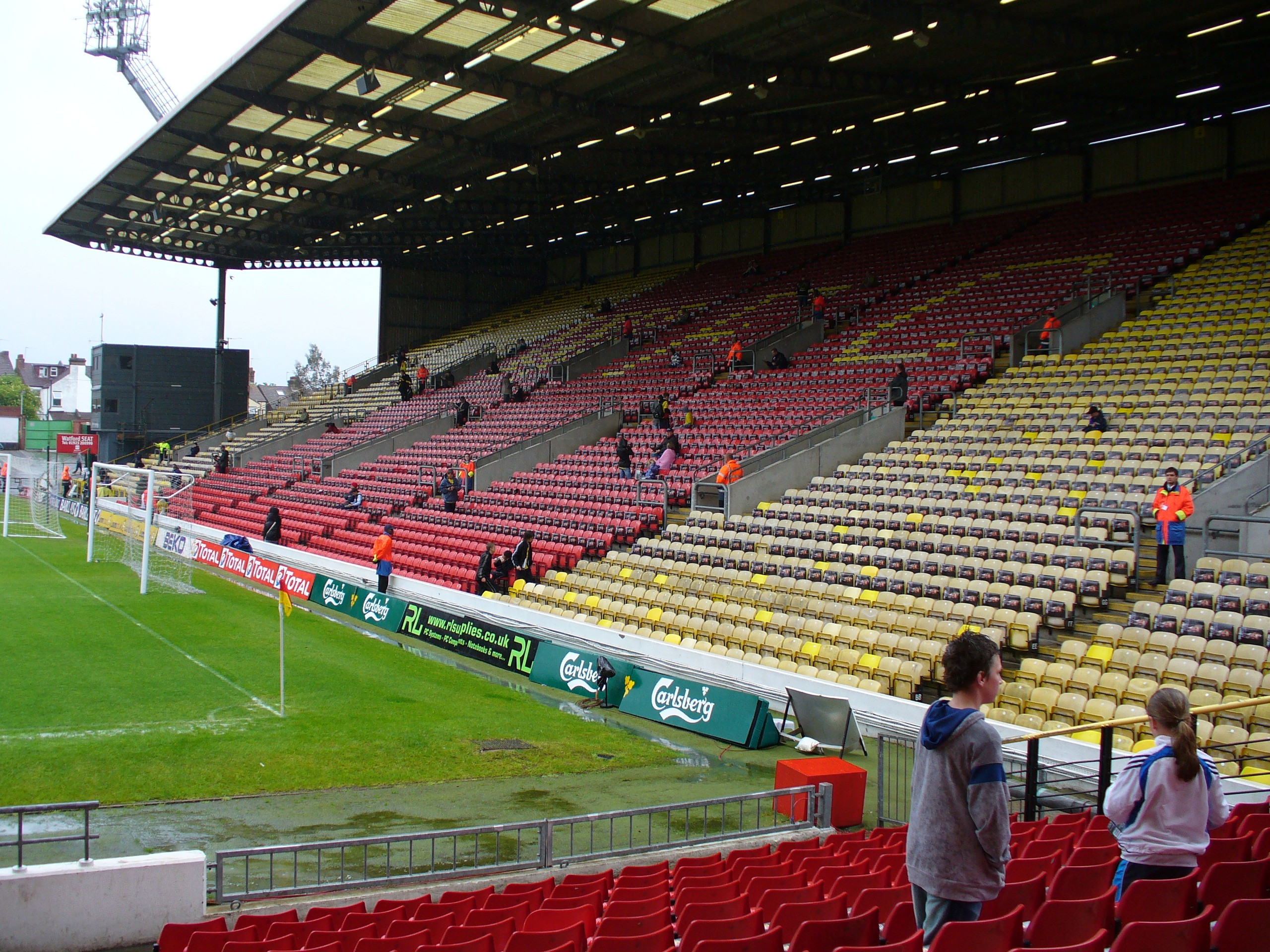
The Rookery Stand.

The Rookery Stand was built over the course of the 1994–95 season. Another former terrace, the all-seater Rookery stand has a capacity of 6,960. Larger than the Vicarage Road stand, it has facilities on two levels and also holds most of the club's administrative areas. The stand cost £1.6 million to build, approximately £300,000 of this figure was contributed by the Football Trust, with the remaining money coming from the £2.3m sale of Paul Furlong by then-owner Jack Petchey in 1994.

When Watford moved from Cassio Road, this end of the ground featured a roof over a cinder bank, and over the years the roof eventually had to be removed for safety reasons. The Supporters' Club eventually raised funds to enable the Rookery End to feature concrete terracing under cover, and this aim was realised in 1959.

The new stand, replacing the 1959 model was used by Watford supporters for the first time on 22 April 1995, for the visit of Bristol City. As part of redevelopment work in conjunction with the Watford Health Campus, 164 units of affordable housing, known locally as The Wrap, were built on and around the Rookery end. Construction finished in 2009.

The Rookery is the "home end". It lends its name to the Watford fans' podcast, From The Rookery End. The stand was known as the Rover South for Saracens matches.

== The Graham Taylor Stand ==
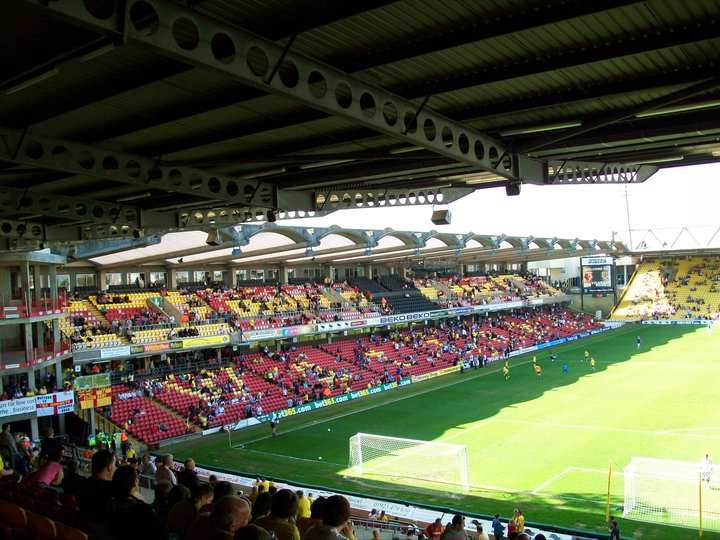
The Graham Taylor Stand and incomplete south west corner (left), pictured in 2012.

The Graham Taylor Stand was renamed for the 2014–15 season, taking its name from the club's most successful manager Graham Taylor. It was previously named after former FIFA president Sir Stanley Rous. The official renaming ceremony took place on 29 November 2014.

The stand with its distinctive wavy roof runs along the side of the pitch, on the west side of the ground. It is a two-tiered stand, with executive boxes and a TV camera gantry. Built in 1986, it replaced the Shrodells Stand. The £3 million development was partly funded via a loan from Elton John. The upper tier, complete with executive boxes, was constructed first, and temporary seats forming a lower-tier were added later. These were later replaced with permanent seats, first used for a game against Notts County on 18 September 1993.

When the club moved from Cassio Road in 1922, the Union Stand was transported and reconstructed on this side of the ground. It was replaced by the Shrodells Stand, which was constructed during the 1930s. It was extended in 1979 with a further 2,200 seats replacing the standing enclosure in front of the stand.

The final match for the Shrodells Stand was a 1–1 draw against Manchester United on 3 May 1986, the Graham Taylor Stand opened on 23 August 1986, when Oxford United visited Vicarage Road, with Watford coming out 3–0 winners.

== The Sir Elton John Stand ==
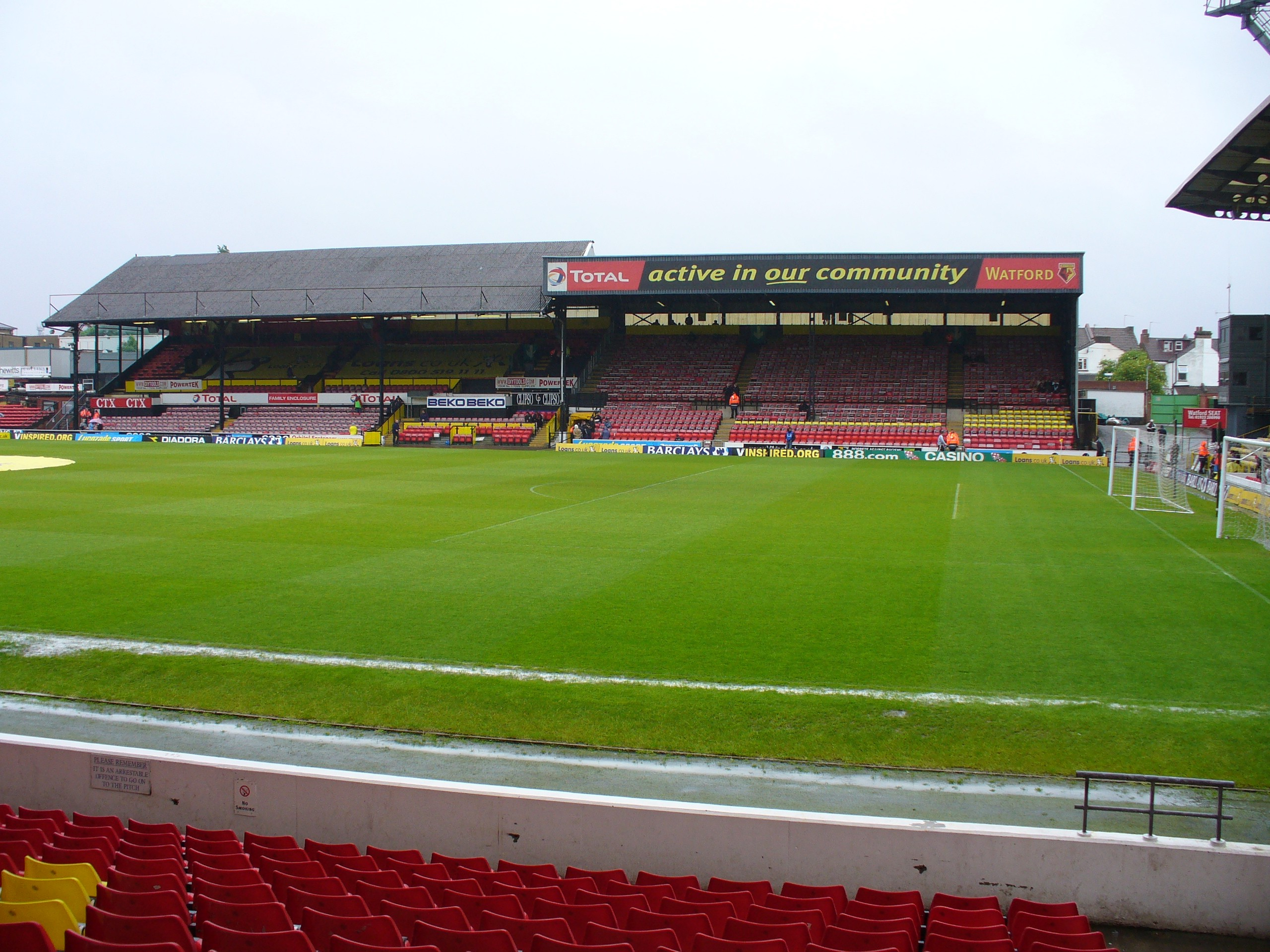
The now demolished Main Stand.

The Sir Elton John Stand sits on the east side of the ground, and contains the changing rooms & tunnel. The stand was fully opened on 13 December 2014, in a ceremony attended by Sir Elton John.

Prior to the development of the Sir Elton John Stand, the east side of the ground was home to the Main Stand, which was constructed in 1922 following Watford FC's move from Cassio Road. The Main Stand was closed in 2008 due to safety concerns.

Following the acquisition of Watford FC by the Pozzo family in 2012, the club were able to finance the development of a new stand to replace the Main Stand. The redevelopment of the east side of the stadium began in 2013, with the aim of developing a 3,000 seater capacity stand which would also house the players changing rooms, television gantry and tunnel.

In May 2014, it was announced the stand will be known as The Watford FC Community Stand. However the club announced in November 2014 that the new stand would instead be named after former chairman Sir Elton John. The changing rooms were used for the first time in a friendly match between Watford and Udinese on 2 August 2014.

On 8 June 2015, the club confirmed that 700 extra seats were being installed in the recently built Sir Elton John Stand. This number was revised a day later to around 1000 extra seats, following the announcement of an expansion in the north-east corner.

== Floodlights ==
The first game under floodlights at Vicarage Road was played in 1953, when lights were installed on top of the Main Stand. These were replaced in 1960, with four pylons being built in the corners of the ground. Currently the floodlights are mounted on the top of the Vicarage Road and Rookery Stands. New LED floodlights were added for the 2015/16 season including lights on the top of the Sir Elton John and Graham Taylor stands.

== Railway stations ==
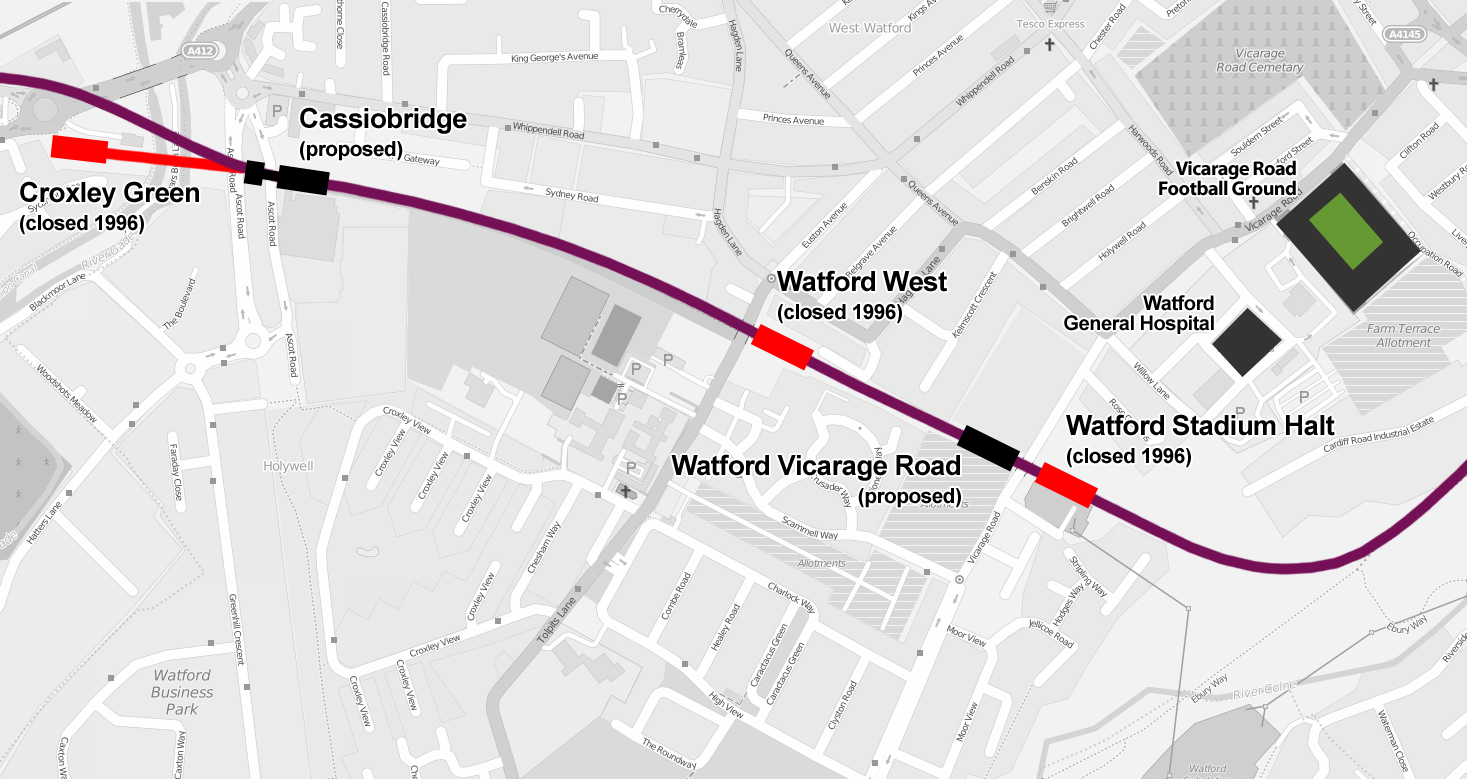
The old and proposed new stations on the Croxley Rail Link near Vicarage Road

In 1982, Vicarage Road Stadium gained its own railway station, Watford Stadium. It was introduced as a means of managing the crowds attending football matches, providing an alternative to Watford High Street and Watford Junction, and was only open on match days. Development of the station was funded jointly by the Football Trust, Watford Borough Council, Watford F.C. and British Rail. The station was officially opened on 4 December 1982 by Elton John and Lord Aberdare, chairman of the Football Trust. The inaugural train rolled into the station five minutes late, bringing away fans of Manchester United to Vicarage Road; the match that day ended with a 1–0 defeat for Watford.

The station fell out of use when British Rail closed the railway line in 1996 and has remained derelict ever since. A new London Underground station, Watford Vicarage Road, was due to open in 2020 on the opposite side of the Vicarage Road bridge as part of the Croxley Rail Link project to extend the Metropolitan line to Watford Junction. However since March 2017 the project has been in doubt due to a significant shortfall in funding from various government entities.

== Greyhound racing ==
Greyhound racing initially began at Vicarage Road on 20 October 1928. The racing was held under National Greyhound Racing Club (NGRC) rules and as many as four race nights per week were held every Tuesday, Thursday, Friday and Saturday at 7.45pm. However the provisional NGRC licence was cancelled as early as 1 November 1928, forcing the track to race independently (unaffiliated to a governing body).

The racing would continue for many years alongside the football team and was still active for the next forty years before a temporary closure on 28 June 1969. On 14 October 1974 racing returned under NGRC rules under the organisation of the industry's leading promoter the Greyhound Racing Association. Derby winning trainer Barbara Tompkins was attached to the track and won the Buckinghamshire Cup at Slough Stadium in 1975 with Houghton Girl.

The shape of track was very sharp due to the nature of the bend design around the football pitch corners and this led to criticism within the industry that it was not safe enough. Despite this a Bookmakers Afternoon Greyhound Service (BAGS) contract was established at the track. During 1977 the club announced plans to end the greyhound racing so that stadium improvements could go ahead. The final race meeting took place on 30 October 1978. The last winner was a greyhound called Chad Supreme.
