= Croxley Rail Link =

Proposed railway project in England

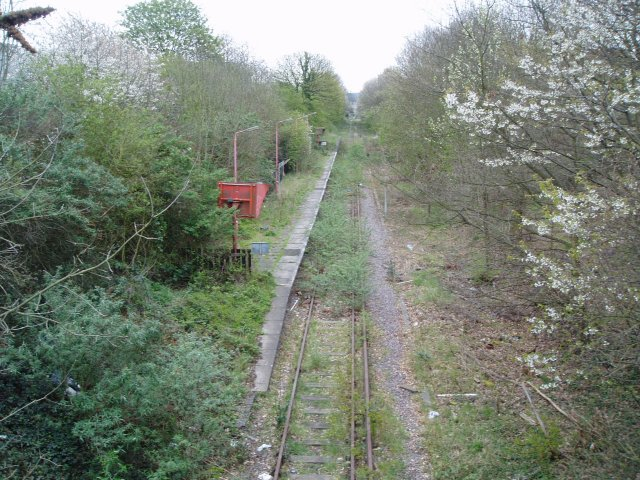
- The disused line at Watford West railway station

Overview
- Status: Approved for re-opening Suspended due to funding
- Locale: Hertfordshire
- Termini: Croxley; Watford Junction
- Stations: 3

Service
- Type: Rapid transit
- System: London Underground
- Operator: Transport for London

History
- Planned opening: 2020

Technical
- Line length: 3.4 mi (5.47 km)
- Track gauge: 4 ft 8 1/2 in (1,435 mm)

The Croxley Rail Link, or the Metropolitan Line Extension, was a proposed railway engineering project in the Watford and Three Rivers districts of Hertfordshire, England, that would have connected the London Overground and the London Underground's Metropolitan line at Watford Junction. If the link were to go ahead, the Metropolitan line's terminus at Watford Underground station would be closed and the line diverted and extended from Croxley to Watford Junction via a reopened section of closed line. The main proponent of the scheme was Hertfordshire County Council but it failed to win the support of Transport for London (TfL) which owns the Watford branch. The engineering works would have consisted of the realignment of the disused Watford and Rickmansworth Railway's line between Croxley Green and Watford High Street, with the construction of a viaduct over the Grand Union Canal, River Gade and A412 road and two new stations before branching into the London Overground line near Watford High Street and continuing to Watford Junction.

The proposed route was featured in a Transport for London network map for 2016 and the Transport for London Indicative 2025 Transport Map on which Watford tube station does not appear. Were the link to be built, direct services between Watford Junction and Amersham would be possible but were not included in the business case for the scheme.

The project was approved by the government on 14 December 2011 and vegetation clearance started during 2013. The project received final government approval through an order under the Transport and Works Act on 24 July 2013 and was signed off and formally given the green light by the government on 17 March 2015 when it was confirmed that Transport for London would be responsible. Work on the extension stopped in 2016 due to anticipated cost overruns and an unresolved dispute over funding. London mayor Sadiq Khan announced in 2018 that there was no funding for the project.

== History ==
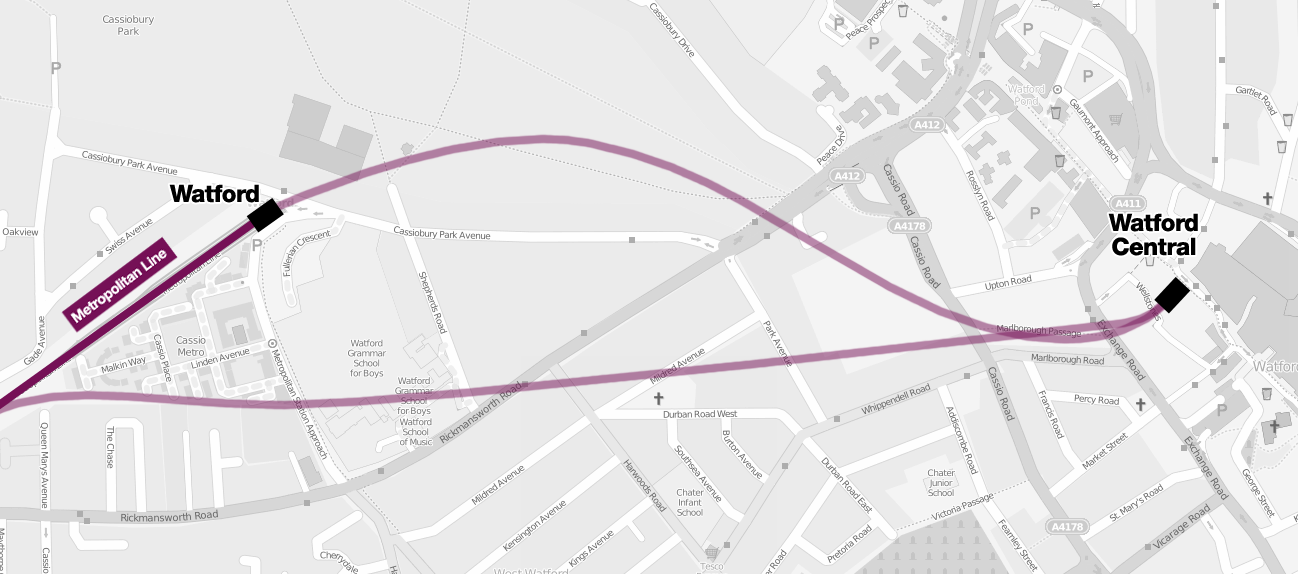
Route options to extend to Watford High Street (1927)

The present-day London Underground Watford station is situated close to Cassiobury Park and somewhat peripheral to the town centre. Watford Urban District Council objected to the proposal to drive a railway across the park, resulting in the terminus of the Watford branch being a mile (1.6 km.) from the High Street.

Also in the area was the single-track Watford and Rickmansworth Railway that opened in 1862 between Watford Junction and Rickmansworth (Church Street). British Rail withdrew passenger services from the Rickmansworth branch in 1952 and ran a skeleton service on the Croxley Green branch until 1996.

Over the years, various schemes were considered to extend the Metropolitan line into the centre of Watford, including an abandoned plan in 1927 to open a Metropolitan Railway station on the High Street, Watford Central. In 1948, the London Transport Executive (LTE), part of the British Transport Commission, considered a proposal to link the Metropolitan line to the BR Croxley Green branch line. A similar proposal was put forward by London Regional Transport (LRT) around 1994. Because the line lay entirely within Hertfordshire, it was championed by the county council who lobbied for funding from LRT (later TfL) and the Department for Transport for 16 years.

== Funding ==
In 2005 Transport for London (TfL) tentatively committed to providing up to £18 million of the estimated cost of £65 million, predicting that the link would be operational by 2010. Difficulties arose in securing the remaining funding from the Department for Transport (DfT) and a revised project submission, under new guidelines, was prepared, with a view to obtaining Programme Entry status. A business case was submitted to the DfT in February 2008, with revised costs of £95 million. The proposal was rejected in March on the basis that no guarantee of financial backing had been received from TfL. In July 2008 the East of England Regional Assembly declared the scheme a "priority" and agreed to contribute £119.5 million towards the estimated cost, now £150 million. Hertfordshire County Council (HCC) agreed to allocate £25.8 million which it hoped to recover through ticket sales and other London Underground revenue. It was predicted that the link could be operational within seven years.

A revised business case was produced in autumn 2009 and the costs and scope reviewed. Following the Cameron–Clegg coalition's Comprehensive Spending Review the project was placed in the pre-qualification pool and a further submission made to the Department for Transport in January 2011. In February 2011 the Department for Transport placed the project into a qualification pool of works that would be subjected to further assessments in order to bid for funding. A Best and Final Funding Bid was submitted to the Department in September 2011. On 14 December 2011, the Department for Transport agreed to fund £76.2 million of the £115.9 million cost, with the remainder from the local authorities (£33.7 million) and third parties (£6.86 million).

In December 2014, Hertfordshire County Council announced that the projected cost of the scheme would rise to £230 million. It was also reported that London Underground could take over construction of the link from Network Rail. According to TfL, HCC had significantly underestimated the costs and the project was faced with "significant project slippage and cost escalation", and for this reason, an agreement was reached with the DfT and HCC whereby London Underground would assume full responsibility for the project, subject to a suitable funding package. Hertfordshire County Council would now contribute £230 million, £34 million would be provided by central government, and LU was to contribute £16 million.

On 25 January 2017, the Watford Observer newspaper confirmed that work which had been ongoing since 2014 had stopped as there was an ongoing funding issue; Transport for London were stating that more than £50 million additional funding was required. A Freedom of Information request revealed that £130 million of the £284 million funding had already been spent, but the only works that had actually been delivered were some utility diversions and route clearance.

In September 2017, Sadiq Khan, the Mayor of London, gave more clarity to the issue, relieving Transport for London of any obligation imposed on it by the previous Mayor, Boris Johnson, to fund a cost overrun. It was noted that at the budgeted cost of £284.4 million, the cost-benefit ratio of the project was only 0.4, so funding a cost overrun now estimated at £73.4 million on top of the £49.2 million Transport for London were already contributing, would not give value for money. It stated that Transport for London's sunk expenditure on the project was £71.2 million, of which £15.5 million was for buying an additional train, which has been delivered and put into service.

In 2018, the government offered Transport for London the £73.4 million additional funding it was apparently asking for, taking total funding available to £357.8 million, subject to Transport for London accepting cost overrun risk again. This arrangement was turned down by the Mayor. The parties were later reported to be examining cheaper alternative schemes such as a rapid bus transit scheme and light rail.

In late 2020, Three Rivers District Council announced that it was seeking to revive the link, citing it as a "shovel ready" project. Discussing the bid, the Liberal Democrat councillor for Croxley Green Peter Getkahn cited Boris Johnson's pledge to "build back better" after the COVID-19 pandemic, mentioning that the extension to the Metropolitan line would be a suitable target for this.

== Proposed route and stations ==
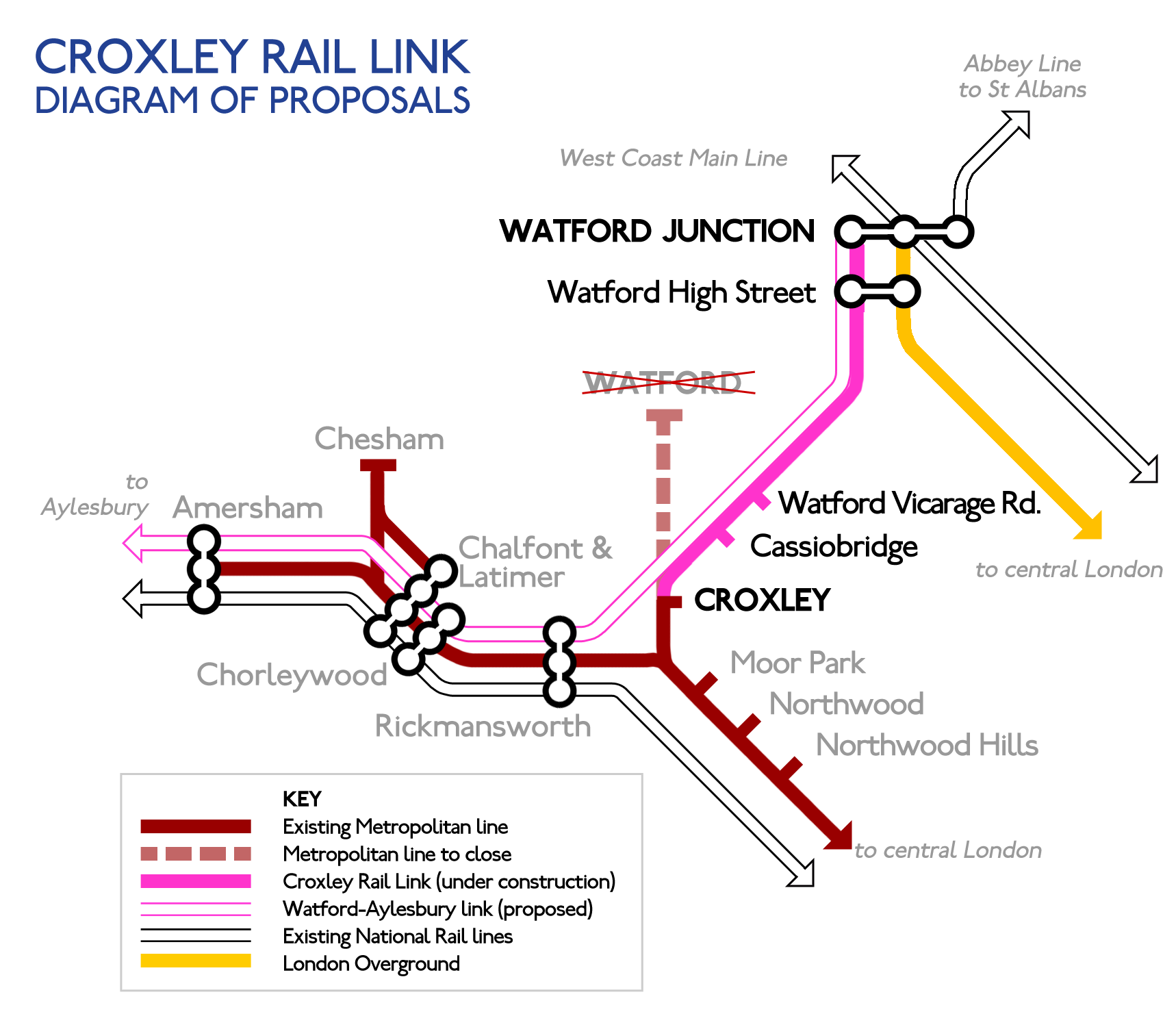
A diagram of the proposed rail services

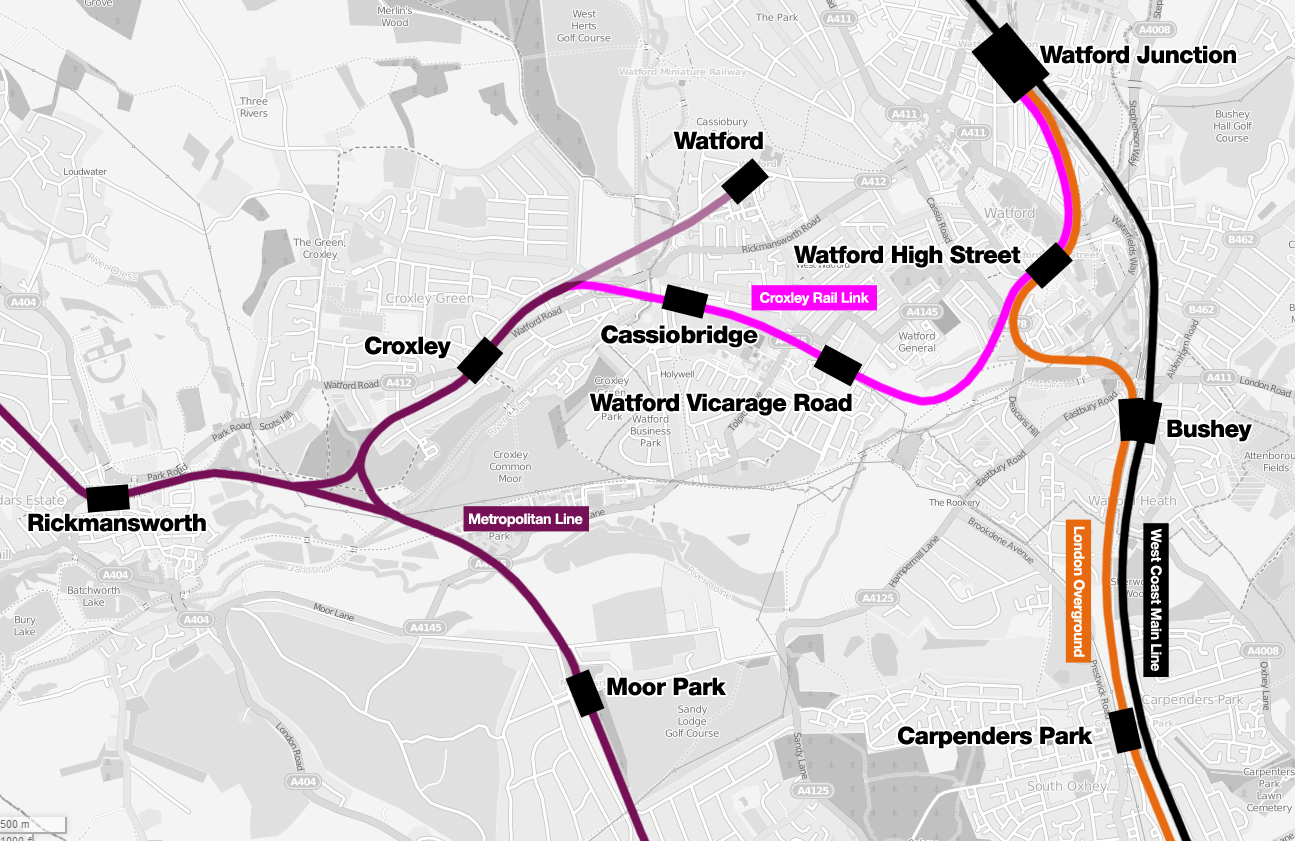
Geographical map of the proposed Croxley Rail Link.

A key part of the project was the construction of a short section of track that would have connected the existing Metropolitan line to the former British Rail Croxley Green branch line at their closest point; this would have been achieved by a new junction near Baldwins Lane, about 1 kilometre (0.6 mi) northeast of Croxley station and a viaduct and a bridge to carry the Metropolitan line over the A412 Watford Road dual carriageway and the Grand Union Canal to the former BR line. Double track would have been laid along the disused trackbed, reinstating the line as far as Watford High Street.

None of the former BR stations that closed in 1996 would reopen. Two new stations were to be built: Croxley Green station replaced by Cassiobridge (previously intended to be called "Ascot Road") and a second station, Watford Vicarage Road, would have replaced Watford West and the football specials halt, Watford Stadium. The new stations would have had ticket machines instead of staffed ticket offices.

=== Stations ===
| Station | Status | Notes |
|---|---|---|
| Watford Junction | Existing | |
| Watford High Street | Existing | |
| Watford Stadium | Closed 1996 | Would be replaced by Watford Vicarage Road |
| Watford Vicarage Road | New station | |
| Watford West | Closed 1996 | Would be replaced by Watford Vicarage Road |
| Cassiobridge | New station | |
| Croxley Green | Closed 1996 | Would be replaced by Cassiobridge |
| Watford | Existing | May close after project completed |
| Croxley | Existing | |

The name Ascot Road was initially chosen by consultants for the first of the two new stations; however, many local people and councillors felt that this name would not reflect the identity of the area. Transport planners also expressed concern that the new station may be too easily confused with Ascot station in Berkshire. The name Cassiobridge was suggested due to historical connections with the area and because of a bridge over the Grand Union Canal, and after some consultation, it was confirmed in August 2013 that the Cassiobridge name would be used instead.

The proposed route of the line would have passed close to Watford General Hospital, where a major business, retail and residential development has been planned. A station named Watford Hospital was planned to serve the development, but its name was changed to Watford Vicarage Road because it was felt that the association with Vicarage Road football stadium would ensure wider recognition outside the local area.

=== Existing Watford Met station ===
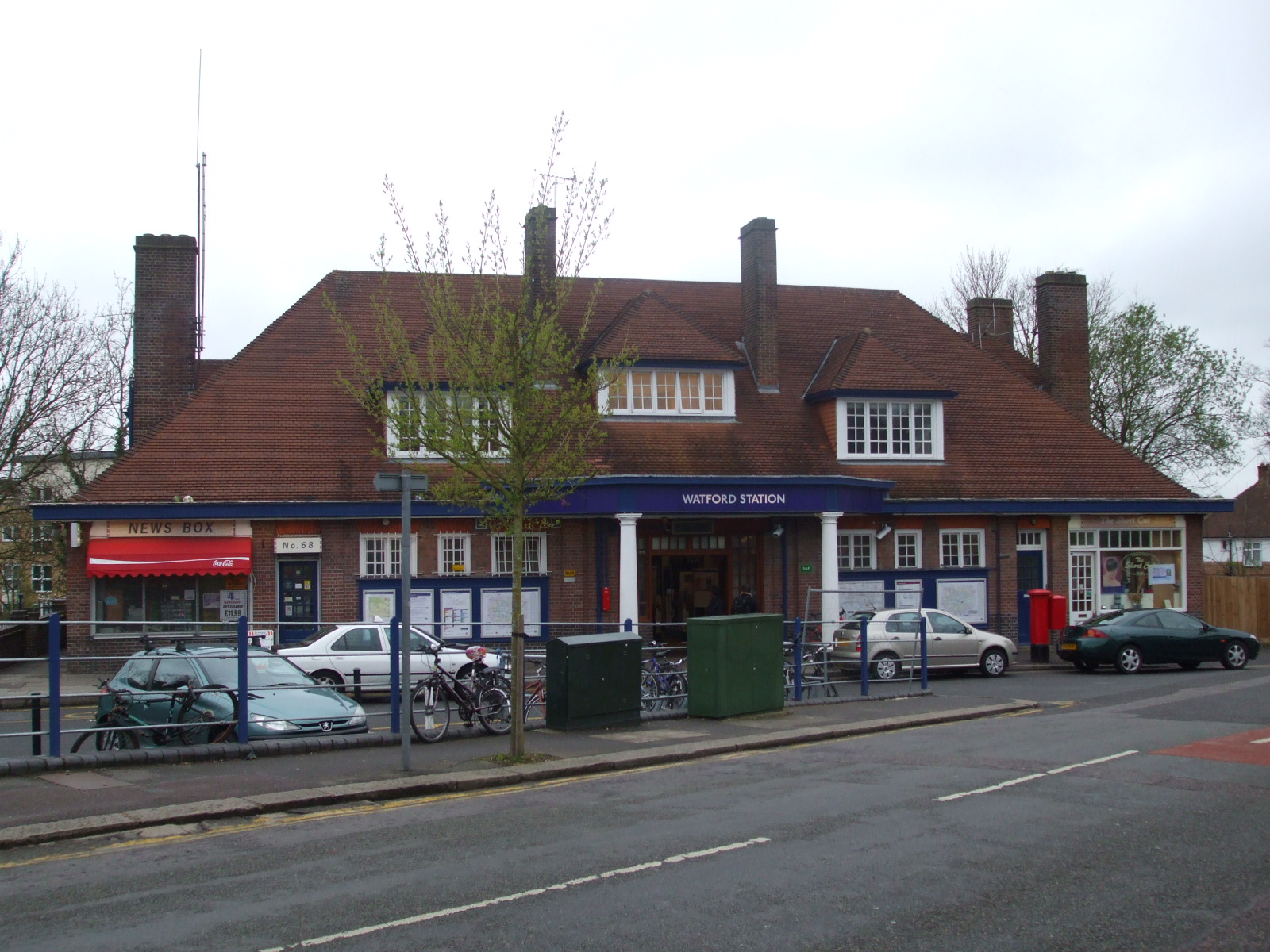
Watford station

Transport for London had stated that passenger services on the Metropolitan line from Croxley to Watford would cease when the Croxley Rail Link opened; Watford station would close, although the short branch might remain in operation as a reversing siding. Following closure, the nearest new station to Watford Met would have been Cassiobridge, about 3/4 mile (1.2 km) away. The plan to close the station had been the subject of some local opposition, and campaigners argued for a reduced shuttle service to be operated on the branch.

Ending services on part of the line and closing a station require a formal closure process involving London TravelWatch. The London TravelWatch Board set up a Watford Station Closure Panel; the panel held a public meeting in Watford on 14 June 2012 to present arguments to TfL against the station closure.

=== Amersham link ===
There was a further suggestion that with use of the existing, but seldom-used, Metropolitan line chord which allows trains to run from Watford towards Amersham via Rickmansworth in conjunction with this rail link, direct services between Watford Junction and Amersham might have been possible some time in the future. London Regional Transport's adapted internal planning Tube map of 1994 illustrated this idea.

The proposal was included in a Greengauge 21 report "Capturing the Benefits of HS2 on Existing Lines"." The report proposed that High Speed Two would increase capacity on the West Coast Mainline, increasing the benefits of an "Amersham Link" to the Croxley Link. These benefits would be further increased by the planned substantial increase in service to Watford Junction and London Euston. It was claimed that this could support a new service from Aylesbury and other London to Aylesbury Line destinations to Watford Junction."

== Alternative proposals ==
Following the cancellation of the London Underground extension scheme, Hertfordshire County Council, Watford Borough Council and Three Rivers District Council are evaluating alternative proposals to re-open the former Watford and Rickmansworth Railway line for public transport use, under the name of the Watford To Croxley Link (W2CL). The possible schemes include:

- A railway spur from Watford Junction terminating at Cassiobridge, to be operated as a shuttle service by London Overground Rail, with a possible junction at Bushey Arches to allow trains to run south to London Euston
- A new Metropolitan line spur branching off north of Moor Park which would run along the route of the current Ebury Way cycle path, joining the Watford DC line at Bushey Arches
- Converting the Abbey line to light rail operation and extending it south of Watford Junction, running alongside the Watford DC line and branching off at Bushey Arches to run along a spur terminating at Cassiobridge
- Re-opening the WRR line as part of a wider guided bus network as part of the proposed Hertfordshire Essex Rapid Transit (HERT) network.

The W2CL proposals are currently unfunded, and Hertfordshire County Council have invited competitive tenders for conceptual design submissions.

In 2026, a local campaign was launched to have part of the line brought back into passenger service and for Watford West railway station to be re-opened. Watford councillors expressed support but emphasised that, due to financial constraints, the track bed could instead be converted into guided bus or trackless tram operation, connecting Watford to St Albans.
