= Watford West railway station =

Closed railway station in Hertfordshire, England

Watford West
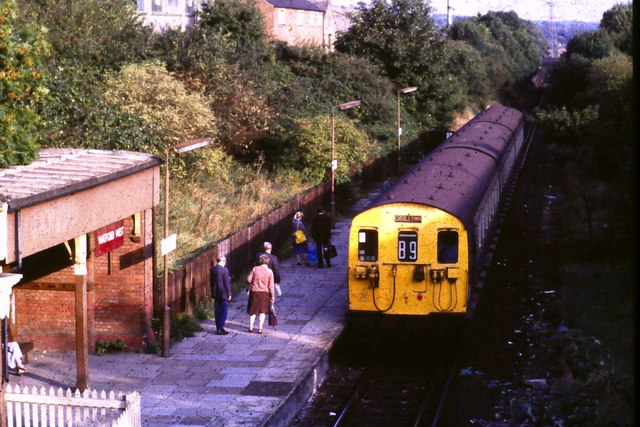
- The station in September 1985.
- Interactive map of Watford West

General information
- Location: Watford
- Local authority: Watford
- Grid reference: TQ098955

Railway companies
- Original company: London and North Western Railway
- Pre-grouping: London and North Western Railway
- Post-grouping: London, Midland and Scottish Railway

Key dates
- 15 June 1912: Station opened
- 22 March 1996: Services ceased
- 25 March 1996: Substitute bus service commenced
- 23 September 2003: Official closure

Other information
- Coordinates: 51.6485°N 0.4143°W

Watford West is a disused railway station in Watford, Hertfordshire, England. It was opened in 1912 by the London and North Western Railway on the branch line from Watford Junction to Croxley Green. It last operated in 1996.

== History ==
The branch line between Watford Junction and Croxley Green was opened in 1912 by the London and North Western Railway (LNWR), connected to the Watford-Rickmansworth (Church Street) line that it had acquired from Lord Ebury's Watford and Rickmansworth Railway (W&RR) in 1881. The W&RR had not been a commercial success, and the LNWR sought to improve passenger traffic by creating new connections in the area to central London. The LNWR also planned an intermediate station, initially to be named Hagden Lane, which opened as Watford West. It consisted of a single platform with a canopy and a red brick ticket office on Tolpits Lane. In the 1980s during the British Rail era, platform signs bore the name West Watford, although this is presumed to be an error.

The station was temporarily closed in 1996 before being permanently closed on 23 September 2003, Facilities at the station had been downgraded in the years prior to closure. At first the station was temporarily closed so the remaining station furniture, including the lampposts, drivers mirrors and the station and street-level signage, was left in situ. In 2004–05, after the station was mothballed, ten passengers purchased tickets for travel to the station.

=== Croxley Rail Link ===
Plans were announced in 2005 to re-open the disused railway line as an extension of the London Underground Metropolitan line. The Croxley Rail Link was planned to link Watford Junction to Croxley tube station, but instead of re-opening Watford West, a new station was planned to open nearby, Watford Vicarage Road tube station. Work began in 2014 to clear the overgrown track bed in preparation for construction work on the new line. By 2017, all work had been halted due to funding problems, and the scheme has since been abandoned.

Watford West and the Croxley Rail Link

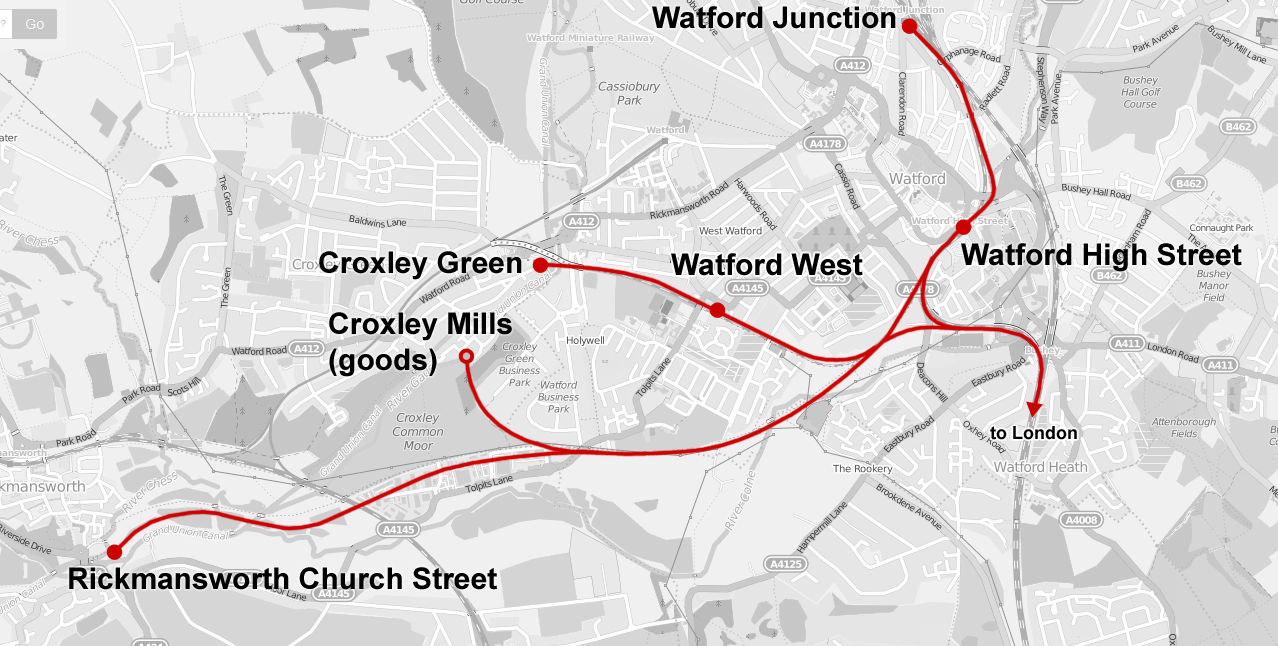
Map of the former Watford and Rickmansworth Railway/LNWR branch lines

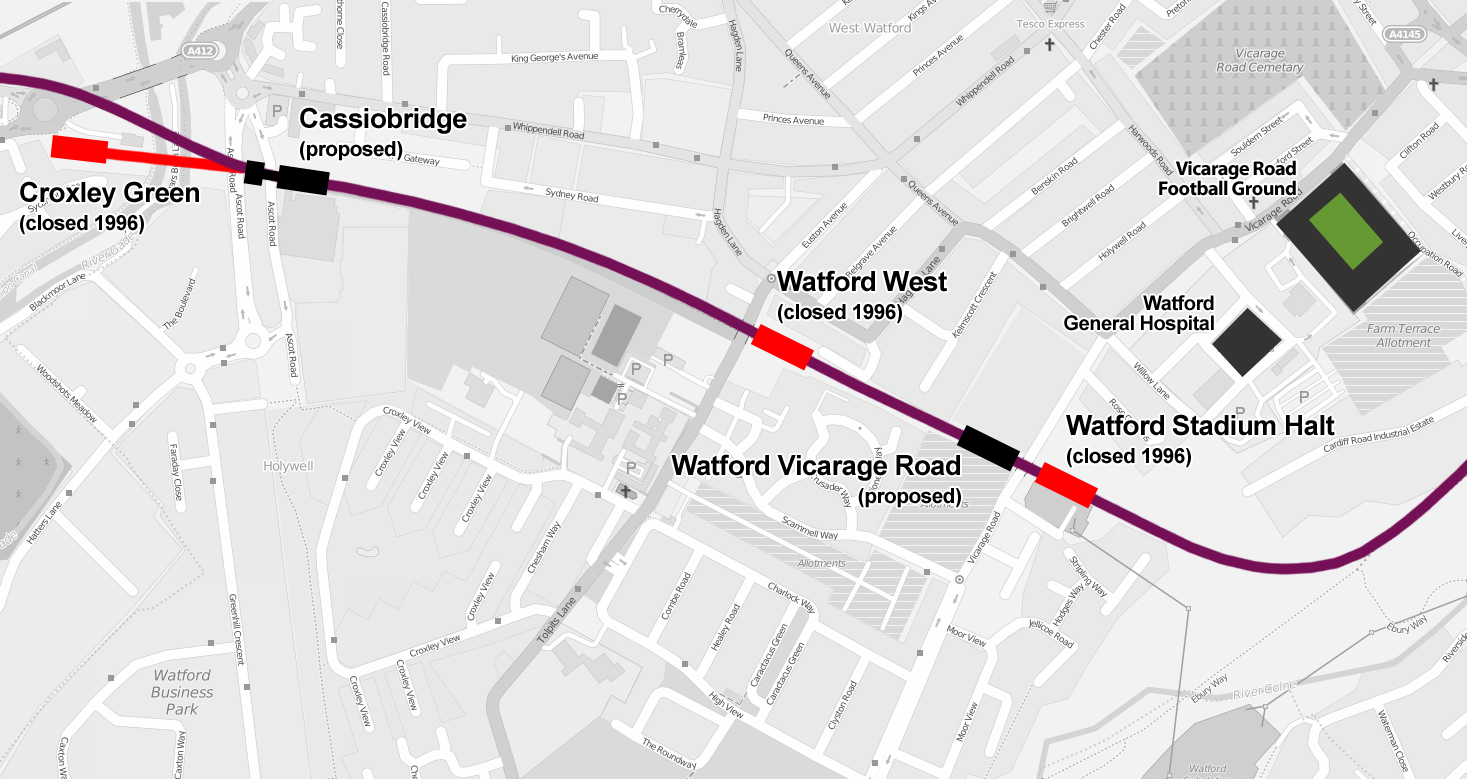
The former LNWR stations (closed 1996) and the proposed stations

=== Re-opening proposal ===
In 2026, a local campaign was launched to have part of the line brought back into passenger service and for Watford West to be re-opened. Watford councillors expressed support but emphasised that, due to financial constraints, the track bed could instead be converted into guided bus or trackless tram operation, connecting Watford to St Albans as part of the proposed Hertfordshire Essex Rapid Transit.

| Preceding station | Disused railways | Following station |
|---|---|---|
| Croxley Green; Line and station closed | Network SouthEast; Croxley Green Branch | Watford Stadium; Line and station closed |
