= Hertfordshire Essex Rapid Transit =

Proposed public transport system in England

HERT

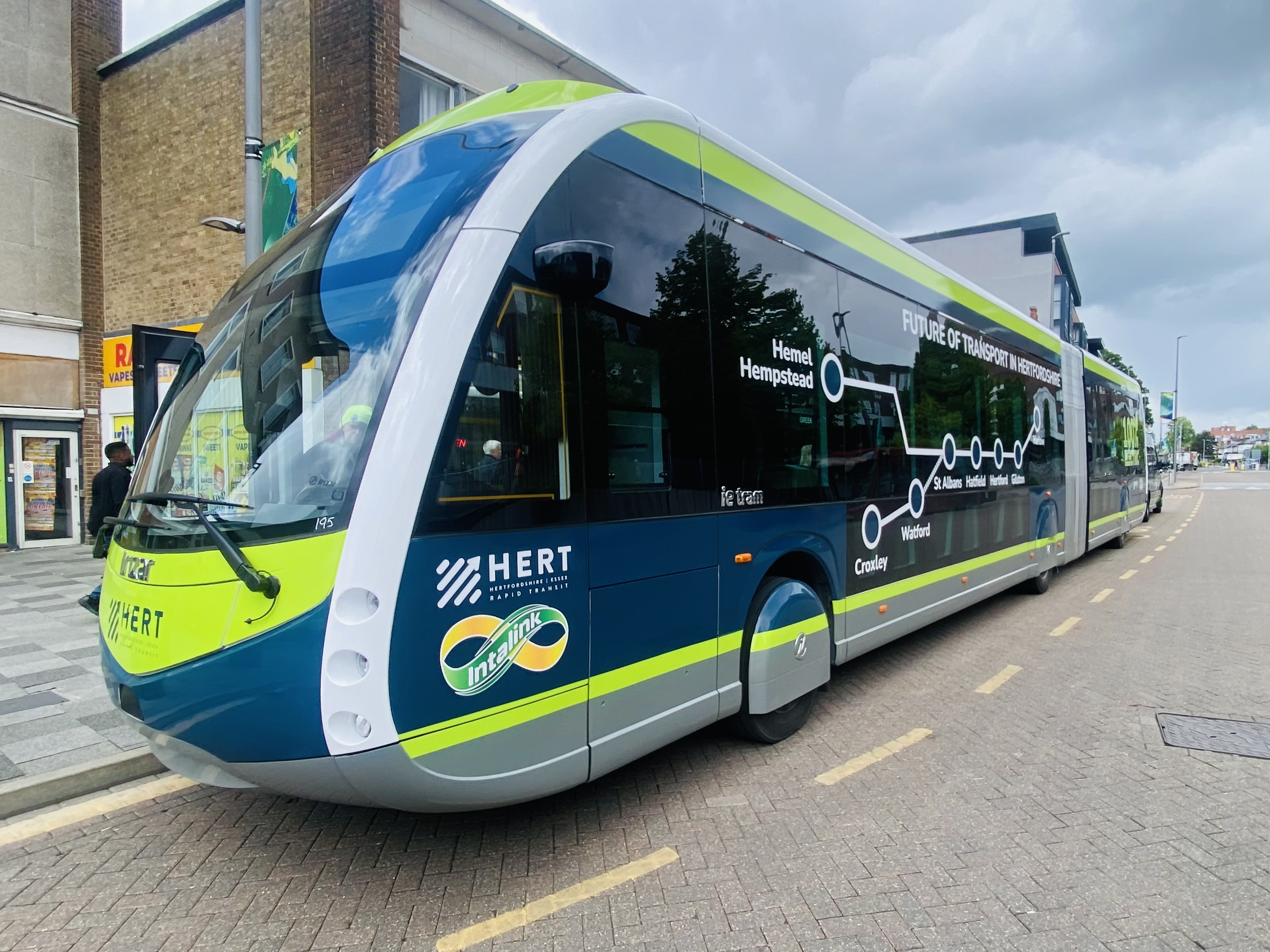
- HERT demonstration vehicle (2026)

Overview
- Owner: Hertfordshire County Council and Essex County Council
- Area served: Hertfordshire and Essex
- Locale: South East England
- Transit type: Autonomous Rapid Transit ("trackless tram"), bus rapid transit or guided bus (proposed)
- Number of lines: 3
- Website: hertfordshire.gov.uk

Hertfordshire Essex Rapid Transit (HERT) is a proposed public transport system, planned to operate across the counties of Hertfordshire and Essex in South East England. It is being jointly promoted by Hertfordshire County Council and Essex County Council. The proposals envisage the creation of an east–west transit system using unspecified electric vehicles.

The project is at the consultation stage and has not been confirmed or funded.

== History ==
In Hertfordshire, roads crossing the county from Hemel Hempstead to Harlow, which is in Essex, suffer from significant traffic congestion. With an increase in housing developments in the area, Hertfordshire County Council (HCC) have sought to mitigate these problems by developing a new public transport scheme. The 43-kilometre (27 mi) journey across the county from Hemel Hempstead to Harlow is difficult by public transport without travelling into London and out again.

The first proposals for a Colne Valley Transit were put forward in the 1980s. This was an east–west light rail transit across Hertfordshire's central belt linking Watford and Hertford. The rapid transit concept developed in the 1990s, known variously as the Central Herts Transit and the Herts Orbital Transit.

These ideas formed the basis of draft proposals for a Mass Rapid Transit (MRT) published in 2018 in HCC's A414 corridor strategy. The MRT scheme envisaged a transit route running eastwards from Watford and Hemel Hempstead to Harlow, with an additional southern route via Hoddesdon and Broxbourne to Cheshunt. A Technical Report was published in 2019.

In 2021-23, Hertfordshire County Council conducted a public consultation about the HERT proposals. It found the 75% of respondents supported or strongly supported the scheme. The project was evaluated by the consultancy City Science.

The HERT scheme would cost an estimated £2.5 billion and would take 10 to 15 years to complete.

The project is also supported by Essex County Council, who are evaluating a separate rapid transit system within Essex linking to Stansted Airport, with a view to integrating it with HERT.

== Proposed route ==
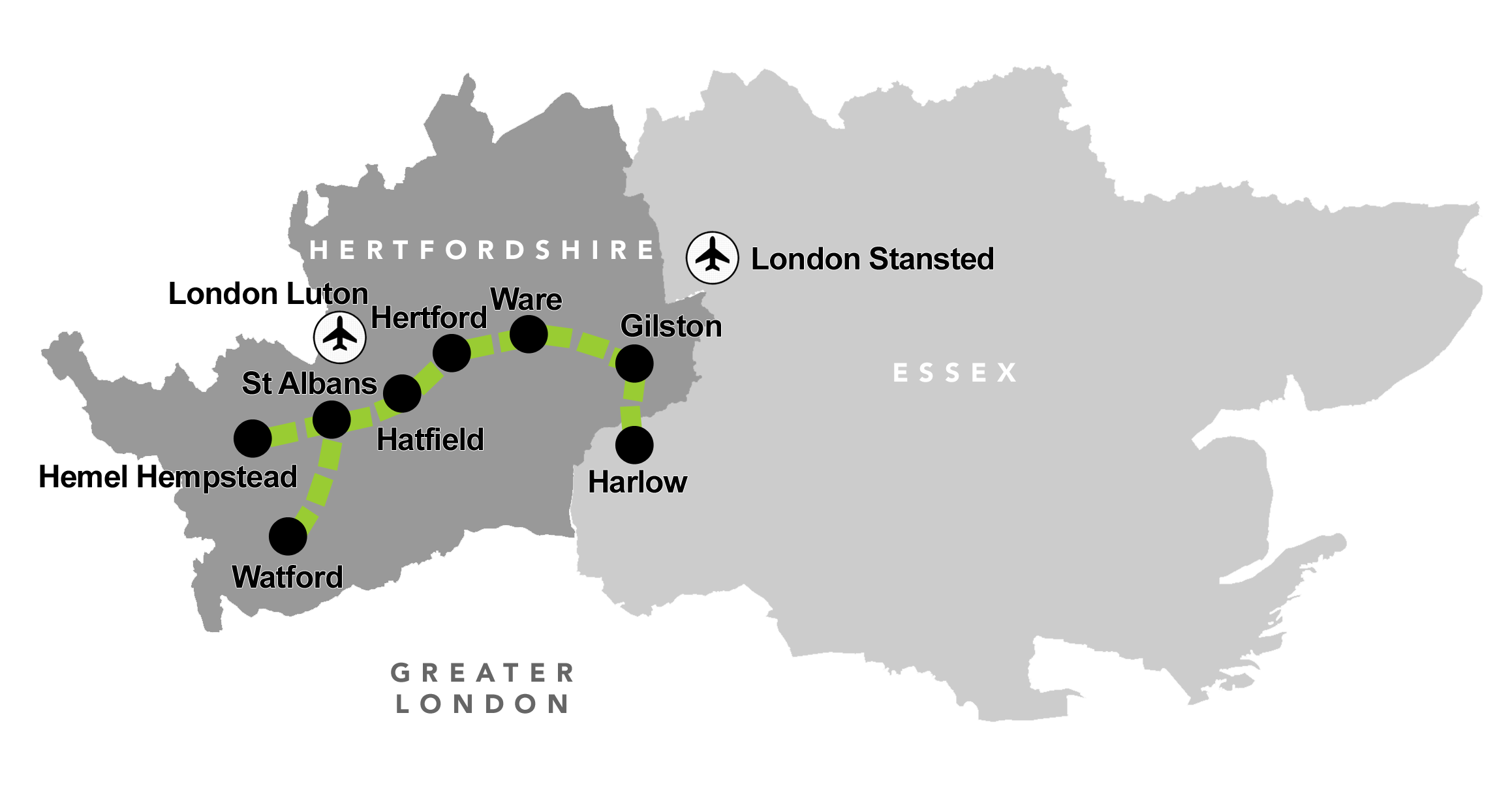
Outline of the proposed HERT rapid transit routes, as yet unconfirmed

A precise route for HERT has not been specified, but it is envisaged that the system will follow an east–west transport corridor between Watford and Hemel Hempstead in the west of Hertfordshire, across the Essex border to Harlow in the east. Detailed route plans were due to be announced in mid-2024, but were delayed pending the results of computer modelling. The current proposals outline three approximate route sections:

- Hemel Hempstead – Gilston: the core east–west section that will serve several towns en route (Hatfield, Hertford, Ware) and the city of St Albans, where there will be an interchange with the Thameslink rail line to Luton Airport
- St Albans – Watford: this route will run north–south, possibly repurposing the Abbey Line rail route and potentially adding a link Watford West
- Gilston – Harlow: a link between the two towns offering interchage at Harlow Town for onward connections to Stansted Airport

Each section would be constructed in phases, dependent on available funding.

In 2024, Watford Borough Council indicated that converting the track bed of the Abbey Line and the former Watford and Rickmansworth Railway to trackless tram operation was being considered, following the failure of the Croxley Rail Link scheme. This would create a segregated route for HERT from Croxley Green via Watford West and Watford Junction to St Albans. A council report published in October 2026 indicated that the Abbey Line would initially be integrated into HERT operations as a railway line, with the possibility that rail services would be replaced by trackless tram operation in future phases.

== Vehicles ==
Vehicle types under consideration

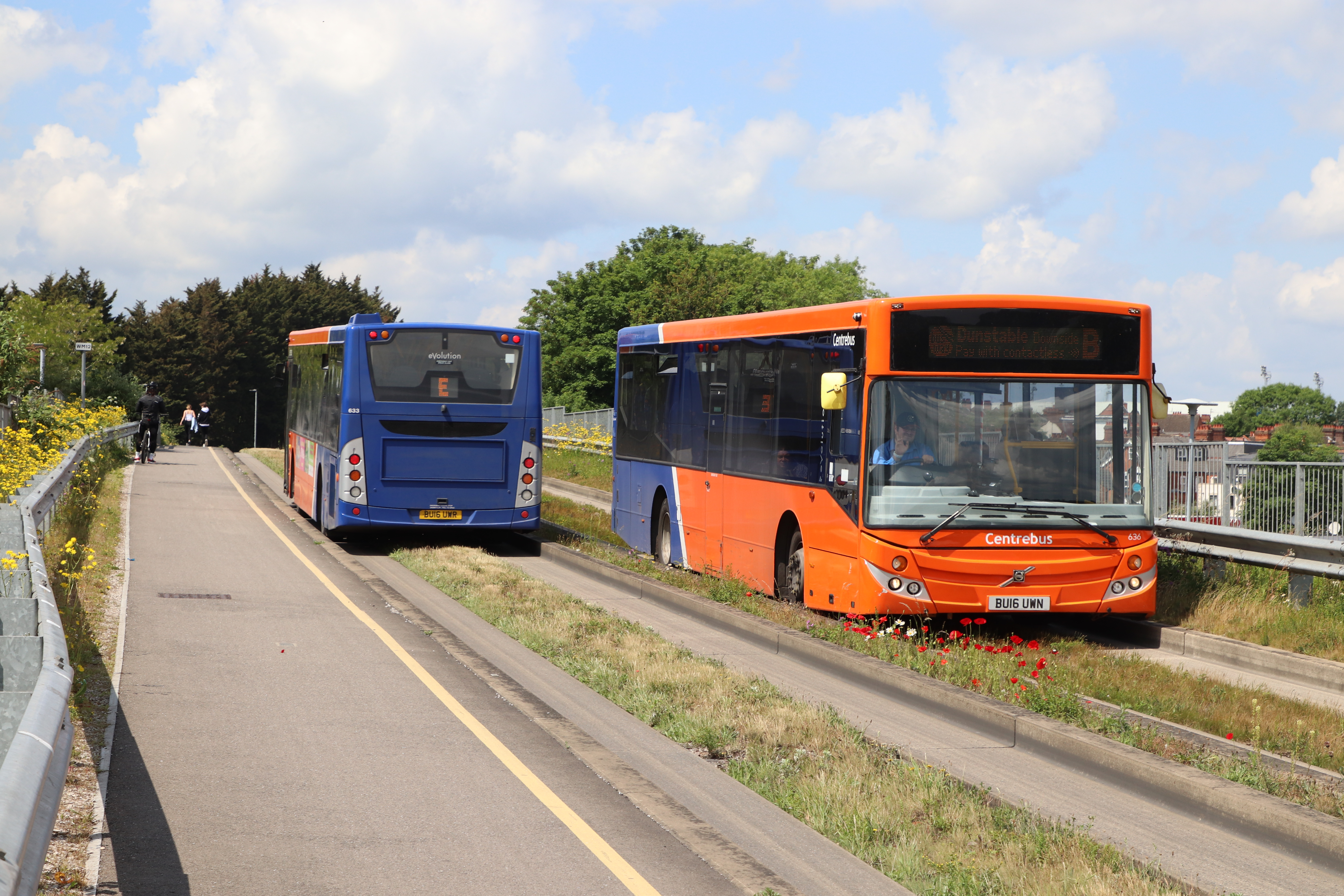
Guided buses on the Luton to Dunstable Busway

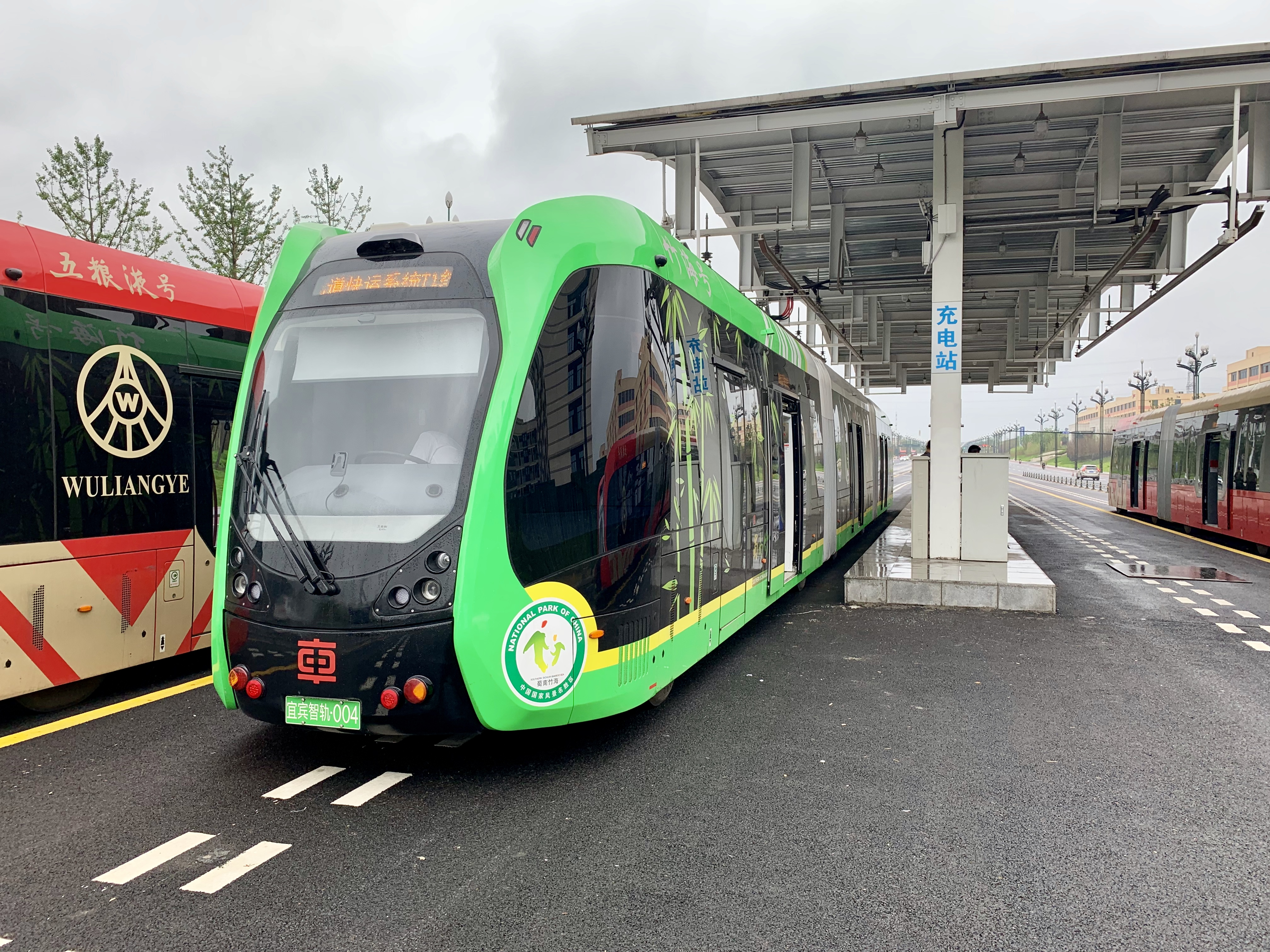
ART buses in Yibin, China

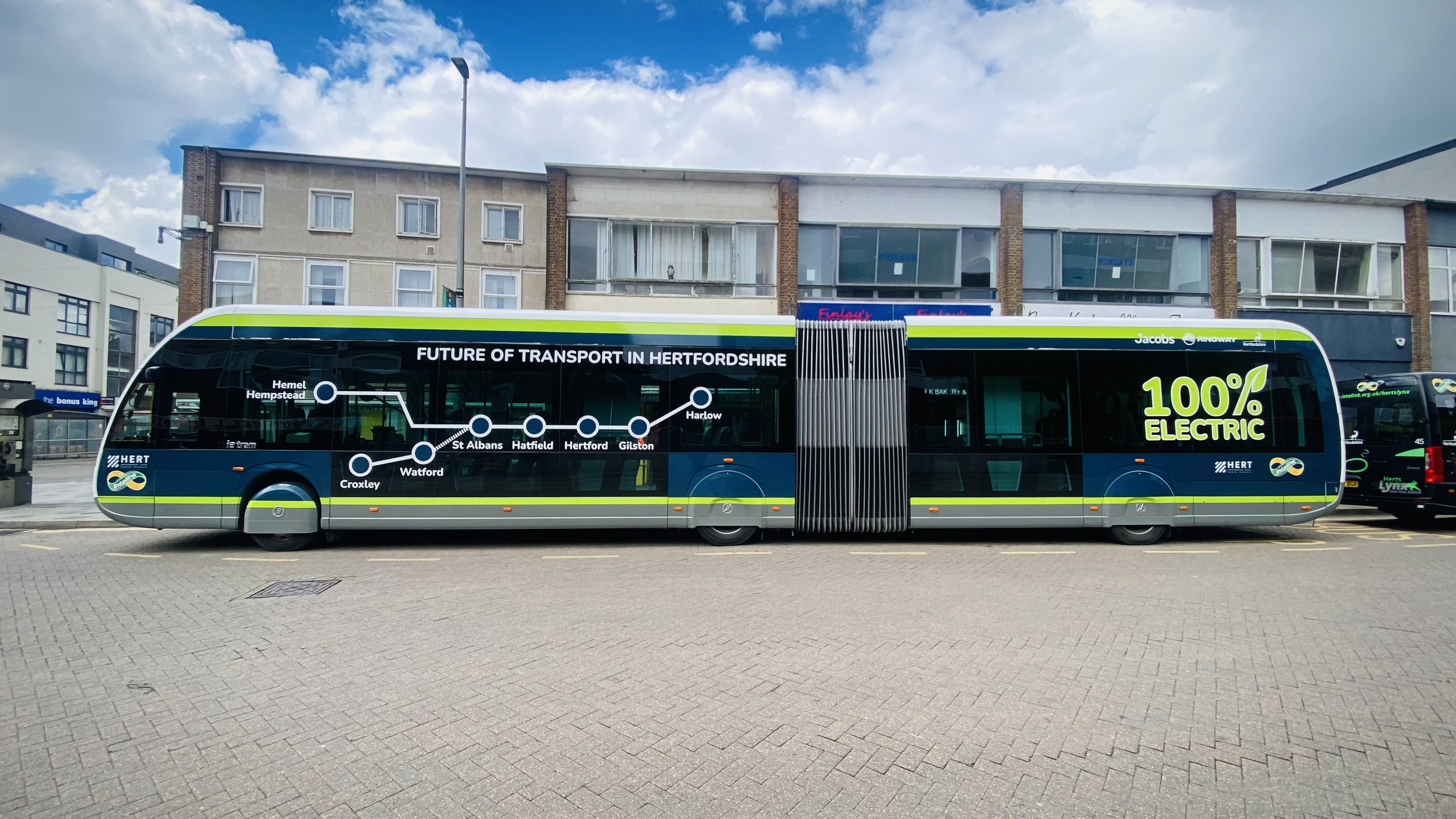
An Irizar ie tram demonstration vehicle in HERT livery on public display in Hemel Hempstead in May 2026

HERT proponents have been evaluating possible vehicle types, including guided busways and Autonomous Rapid Transits

HERT vehicles have not been fully specified, but Hertfordshire County Council have identified Autonomous Rapid Transit as the preferred option. The council had previously evaluated other zero-emission passenger vehicles such as bus rapid transit, guided busways, heavy rail, light rail/very light rail trams, and personal rapid transit, taking into consideration cost, practicality, infrastructure needs and the provision of fast and reliable transit.

In May 2026, a public consultation was organised by Hertfordshire County Council, touring Hertfordshire towns and displaying an Irizar ie tram demonstration vehicle in HERT livery.

== See also ==
- Green Line bus route 724 - limited stop bus that covers much of the same route
