= Watford High Street railway station =

London Overground station

Watford High Street
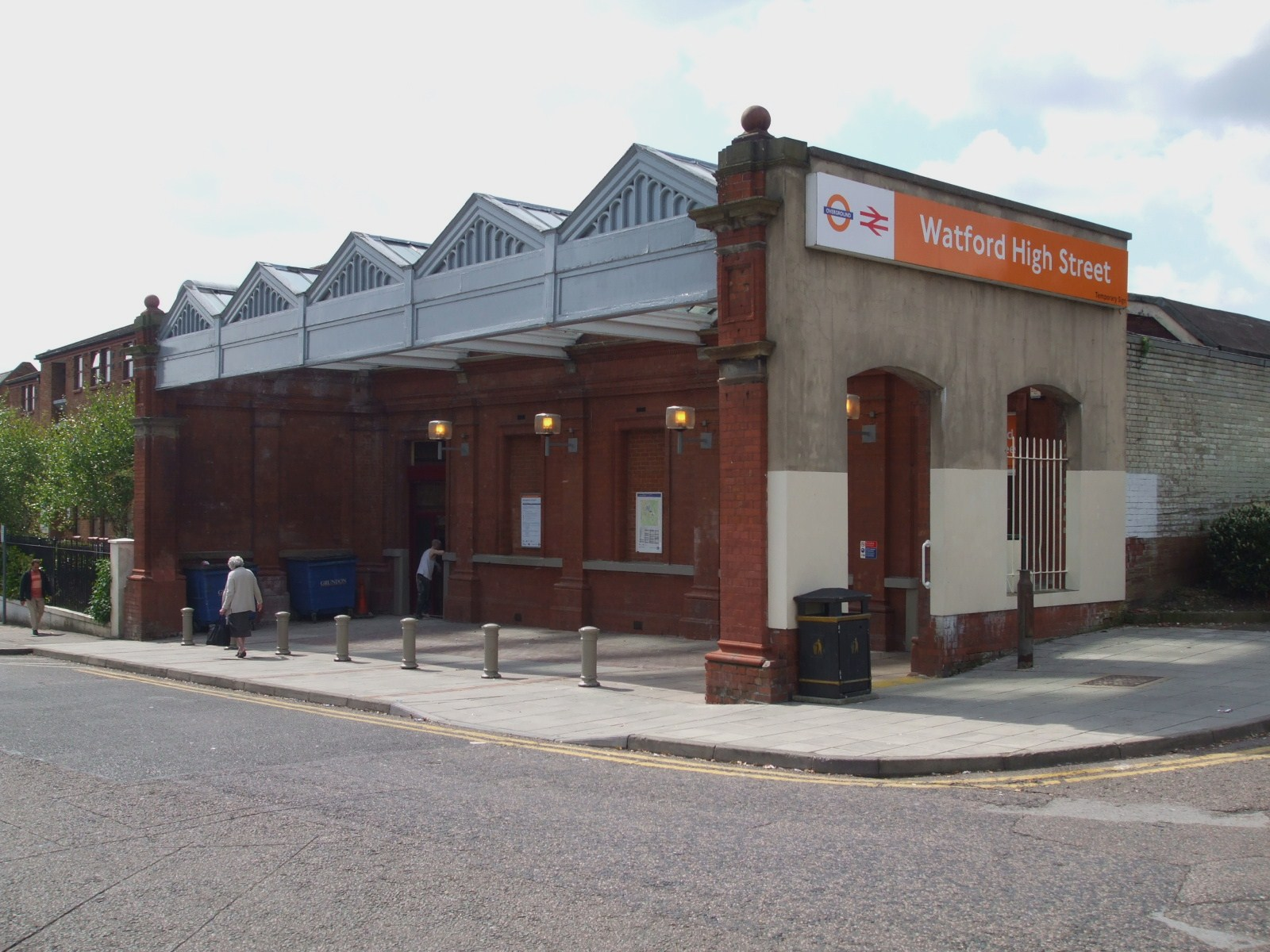
- Interactive map of Watford High Street

General information
- Location: Watford
- Local authority: Borough of Watford
- Managed by: London Overground
- Owner: Network Rail
- Station code: WFH
- DfT category: D
- Number of platforms: 2
- Fare zone: 8

National Rail annual entry and exit
- 2020–21: ▼0.516 million
- 2021–22: ▲1.064 million
- 2022–23: ▲1.162 million
- 2023–24: ▲1.192 million
- 2024–25: ▲1.363 million

Key dates
- 1 October 1862: Opened (W&RR)
- 16 April 1917: Started (Bakerloo line)
- 24 September 1982: Ended (Bakerloo line)

Other information
- External links: Departures; Facilities
- Coordinates: 51.652597°N 0.391812°W

Watford High Street is a station on the Lioness line of the London Overground, located in the centre of Watford, Hertfordshire. It is the only station on the sole deviation of the Watford DC line away from the West Coast Main Line, situated between Bushey and Watford Junction stations. It is in London fare zone 8.

== History ==
The station was opened by the Watford and Rickmansworth Railway (W&RR) on 1 October 1862, with services running from Watford Junction to Rickmansworth (Church Street). In 1912 a branch was opened to Croxley Green. The line came under the ownership of London and North Western Railway (LNWR), which was absorbed into the London, Midland and Scottish Railway (LMS) in 1923, following the grouping of Britain's railway companies.

Additional rail services were introduced to Watford High Street; on 16 April 1917 the Underground Electric Railways Company of London extended its Bakerloo line through this station to Watford Junction, and in 1922 the LNWR completed the suburban Camden to Watford Junction New Line, linking Watford High Street to London Euston via the Watford DC line (shared with the Bakerloo line).

After nationalisation in 1948, the Watford DC line was run by British Rail (from 1986 under its Network SouthEast brand). At the height of operation around the 1950s, Watford High Street was served by the Bakerloo line, and by British Rail trains on both the Croxley Green and Rickmansworth branches, a local all-stations service to Euston and another local service to Broad Street via Primrose Hill. Over the years, most of these services were gradually withdrawn. The Rickmansworth branch was a poorly used service and passenger services were terminated by BR in 1952. Croxley Green services continued as Parliamentary trains until the line closed fully in 1996. On 24 September 1982, London Transport cut back the Bakerloo line to run only as far north as Stonebridge Park (reinstating the service as far as Harrow & Wealdstone in 1984). London Broad Street station was closed in 1986 and trains on the Primrose Hill route were diverted to Liverpool Street until 1992, when passenger services on the Primrose Hill line were withdrawn completely. After the withdrawal of the Croxley, Bakerloo and Broad Street routes, the only remaining service running from Watford High Street was British Rail's Watford DC line to Euston.

Following the privatisation of British Rail the franchise for the Watford DC line was taken over by National Express who ran the line under its Silverlink Metro name. In 2007 the line was brought under the control of Transport for London, who today operate it as part of the London Overground network under the Lioness line name; this service uses the 750 V DC lines for its all-stations local service with the 4th rail presently redundant except as part of the electrical return circuit.

== Location ==
Watford High Street station is located in the Lower High Street in Watford town centre. In the immediate vicinity around the station are a number of retail and civic amenities including the Watford Museum, containing a gallery of fine art and displays of local heritage, and the 1.4-million-square-foot (130,000 m^{2}) atria Watford Shopping Centre (also known as the Harlequin Centre), the largest shopping centre in Hertfordshire, which attracts more than 17 million customers each year. Various other shopping parks are also close to the station, including a large Tesco Extra, Waterfields Shopping Park (containing large stores such as Sports Direct and Next), as well as many stores situated on the High Street.

Watford town centre has many popular bars and clubs, such as PRYZM; the only producing theatre in Hertfordshire, the Watford Palace Theatre; as well as numerous restaurants and cafes, both chain and independent.

To the east of the railway line is the site of Benskins Brewery, the office building for which is now Watford Museum. The brewery was rail-served by sidings until 1956. The station is situated in a deep cutting covered by a single platform canopy. The roof of the canopy is connected to the concrete sided cutting by ornamental metal trusses.

== Services ==
All services to this station are operated by London Overground. It is on the Lioness line of the network and operates with a frequency of four trains per hour, approximately every fifteen minutes from Monday to Sunday.

Preceding station	London Overground	Following station
Watford Junction Terminus	Lioness line Watford DC line	Bushey towards Euston
Disused railways
Watford Junction	British Rail Rickmansworth Branch	Rickmansworth (Church Street)
Watford Junction	Network SouthEast Croxley Green Branch	Watford Stadium
Preceding station	London Underground	Following station
Former services
Watford Junction Terminus	Bakerloo line (1917–1982)	Bushey towards Elephant & Castle
Abandoned Plans
Preceding station	London Underground	Following station
Watford Junction Terminus	Metropolitan line Croxley Rail link	Watford Vicarage Road towards Baker Street or Aldgate

== Connections ==
The station is served by local bus routes 142, 258, 306, 321, 328, 346, 602, 635, 832, 885 and W20.

Other services to alternate destinations operate from Watford town centre bus stops, which are a short distance from the station.

== Future ==
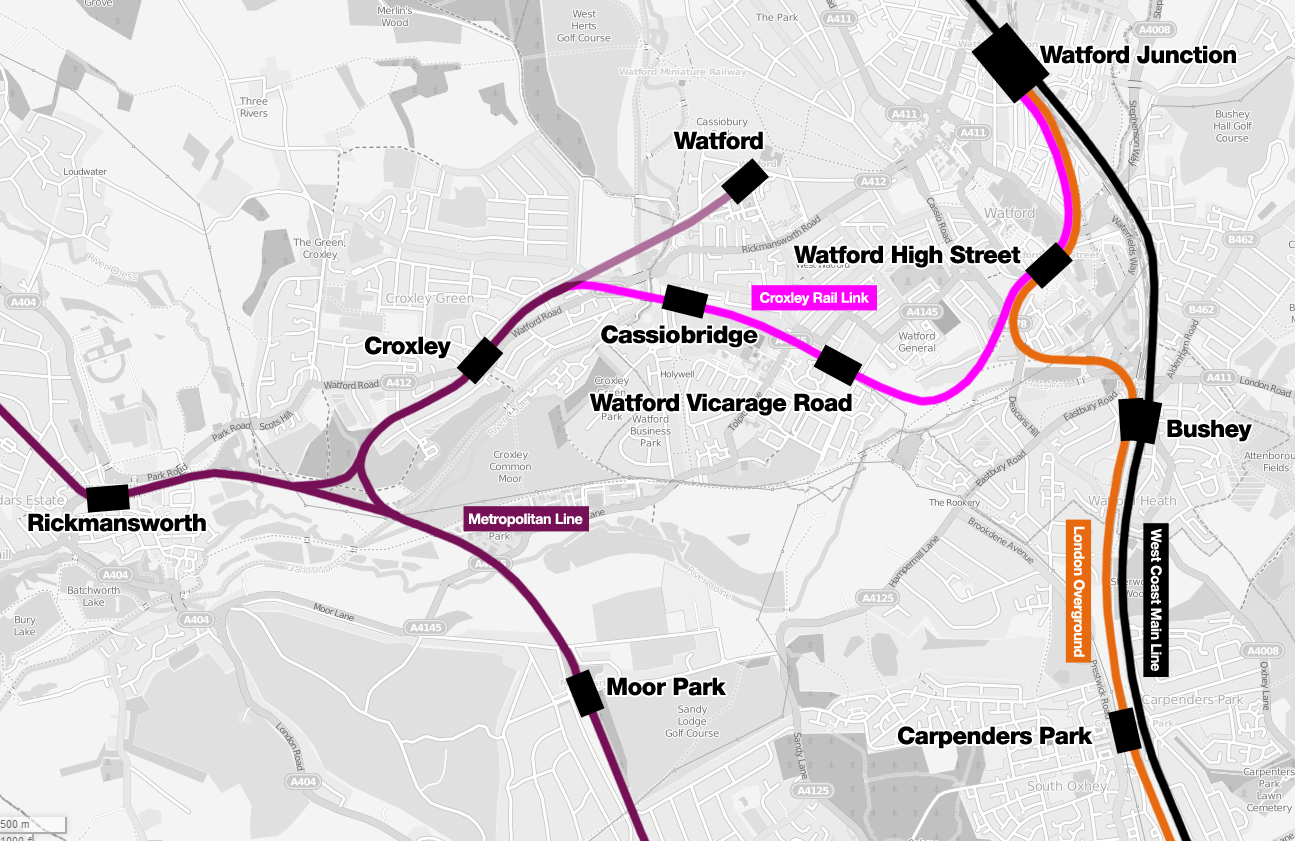
Croxley rail link map

In 2011, a project to extend the London Underground's Metropolitan line to Watford Junction was announced. The planned Croxley Rail Link would have diverted the Metropolitan line branch across the town along a reinstated stretch of disused track of the former Watford and Rickmansworth Railway; the link would then have joined the Watford DC line just south of Watford High Street, and Underground trains would have shared track with London Overground through to Watford Junction. The scheme was cancelled in 2018 due to funding difficulties.
