= Cassiobridge tube station =

Proposed London Underground station in Watford for the Croxley Rail Link project

Cassiobridge
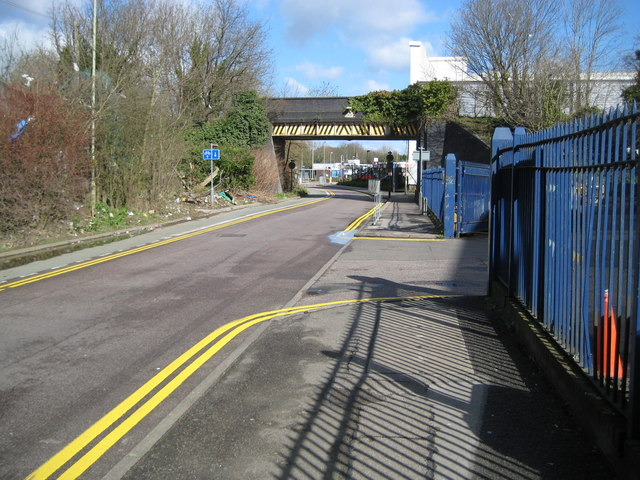
- Ascot Road railway bridge
- Interactive map of Cassiobridge

General information
- Location: Watford
- Local authority: Watford Borough Council
- Managed by: London Underground
- Number of platforms: 2

London Underground annual entry and exit
- 2020: Not opened
- 2021: Not opened
- 2022: Not opened
- 2023: Not opened
- 2024: Not opened

Key dates
- 2020: Planned opening

Other information
- Coordinates: 51.650993°N 0.424283°W

Cassiobridge was a proposed London Underground station in Watford, Hertfordshire, England. The station would have been part of the Croxley Rail Link project, a scheme to extend the Metropolitan line to Watford Junction railway station. It would have been served by Metropolitan line trains between Watford Junction and Central London via Baker Street. The railway line would run over Ascot Road via a viaduct and the platforms would have been situated on the east side of the road. Entrance to the station would have been from the west side of the road, with a ticket hall and other facilities at street level. Passengers would gain access to the platforms via stairs and lifts and a short footbridge over the road.

The station is projected to offer interchange with local transport services, and operate as an unstaffed station, providing automatic ticketing facilities similar to a DLR station. There is potential for Park and Ride facilities to be provided, although planning documents indicate high levels of congestion on adjacent roads. Watford station would close to passenger services, so that all trains from Croxley would continue to Watford Junction.

The railway and station had been expected to come into service in 2020 but on 25 January 2017, the Watford Observer newspaper published an update on the Croxley Rail Link confirming that work had stopped as there was an ongoing funding issue.

== Station name ==
Originally the station was to be called Ascot Road but some local people and councillors considered that this name would not reflect the identity of the area. Transport planners also expressed concern that the new tube station could be too easily confused with Ascot station in Berkshire. After some consultation on the names of the two new stations on the line, it was decided in August 2013 to use the name Cassiobridge instead, while the planned Watford Hospital station was changed to Watford Vicarage Road to be more recognisable outside the area.

Cassiobridge as a name has some historical provenance. There was a Cassiobridge Farm close to a bridge over the River Gade and nearby there is an early 19th-century timber house called Cassiobridge Lodge. These properties are linked with the former stately home of Cassiobury House and its estate, now the public Cassiobury Park, and the surrounding suburb of Cassiobury. The two modern bridges in the area now carry the A412 road over the Grand Union Canal and the River Gade.

Cassiobridge and the Croxley Rail Link

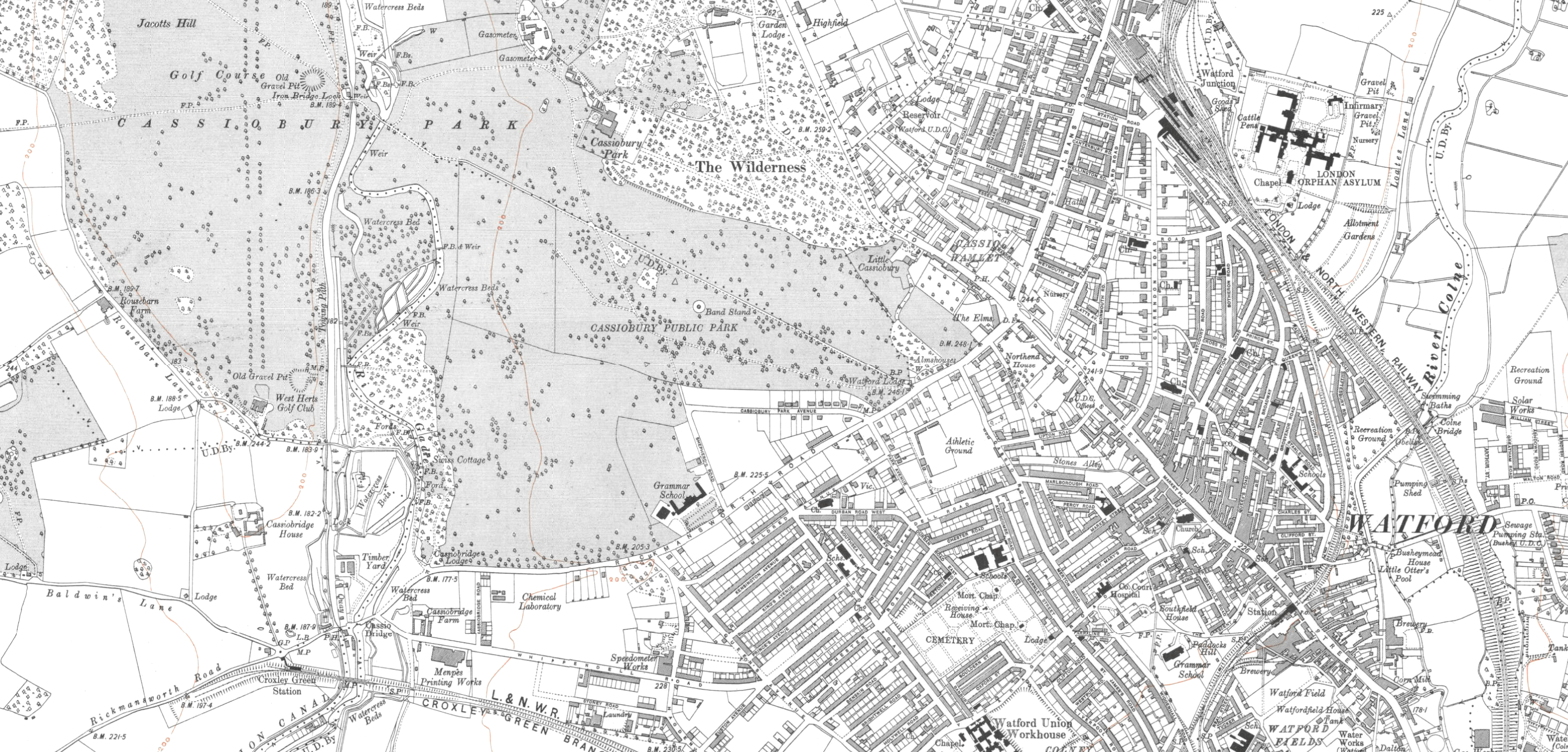
1920 OS map of Watford showing Cassio Bridge at the bottom left corner

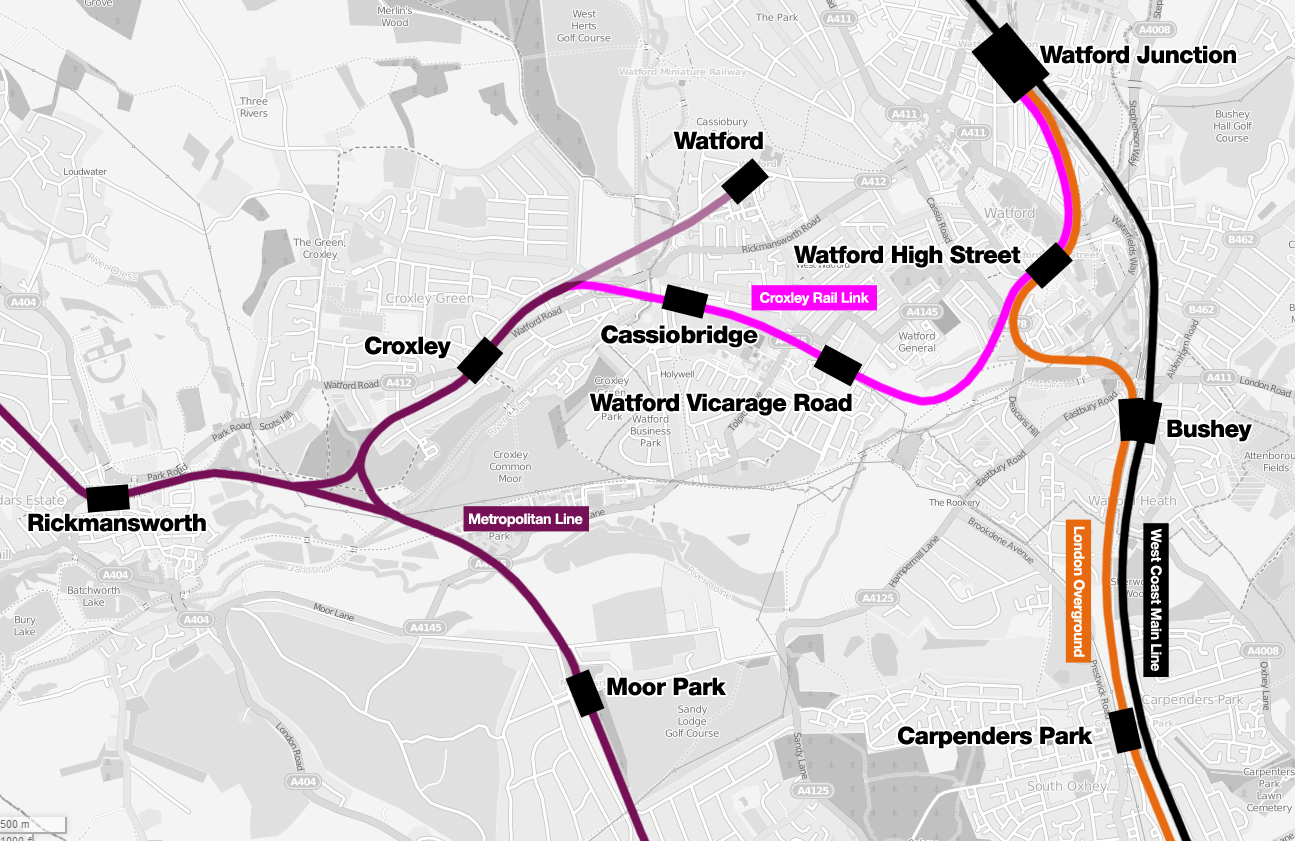
Map of the Croxley Rail Link via Cassiobridge

Abandoned Croxley Rail Link plan
Preceding station	London Underground	Following station
Watford Vicarage Road towards Watford Junction	Metropolitan line Croxley Rail link	Croxley towards Baker Street or Aldgate
