= Watford Vicarage Road tube station =

Planned London Underground station

Watford Vicarage Road
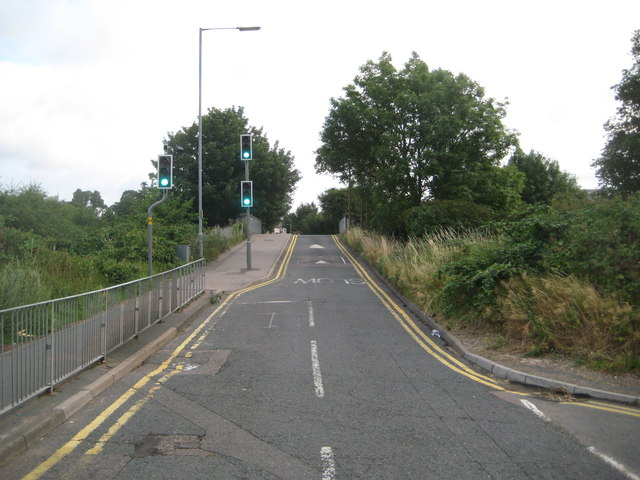
- Vicarage Road railway bridge Looking northeast towards the hospital The site of the proposed station was to be on the left of the bridge
- Interactive map of Watford Vicarage Road

General information
- Location: Watford
- Local authority: Watford
- Managed by: London Underground
- Number of platforms: 2

London Underground annual entry and exit
- 2021: Not opened
- 2022: Not opened
- 2023: Not opened
- 2024: Not opened
- 2025: Not opened

Other information
- Coordinates: 51.646626°N 0.409284°W

Watford Vicarage Road was a proposed London Underground station in Watford, Hertfordshire. The station was proposed to be part of the suspended Croxley Rail Link project, a scheme to extend the Metropolitan line to Watford Junction railway station, which would have been served by Metropolitan line trains between Watford Junction and Central London via Baker Street. Originally the station was to be named either Watford Hospital or Watford General Hospital. On 25 January 2017, the Watford Observer newspaper published an update on the Croxley Rail Link confirming work had stopped as there was an ongoing funding issue.

== Site ==
Watford Vicarage Road was to have been a newly constructed station on a re-opened section of the former LNWR Watford and Rickmansworth Railway line which was closed by British Rail in 1996. The station was to have been located to the west of Vicarage Road, adjacent to Holywell allotments, with the platforms in the railway cutting below the road. The single-storey glass and metal-clad station building was to be at street level, with staircases and lifts providing platform access. Designs for the new station, and others on the link, were prepared by Acanthus LW Architects.

The new station was to have been between the sites of two former railway stations on the old LNWR line; to the west of the former Watford Stadium and to the east of the former Watford West railway station on Tolpits Lane. It was not planned to re-open these disused stations and the platforms at both former stations would have been removed or modified to accommodate the two new tracks.

== Name ==
The name originally proposed for the station was Watford Hospital, to reflect its proximity to Watford General Hospital. Local campaigners petitioned Transport for London (TfL) to name the station after Vicarage Road Stadium, home of Watford F.C., as they felt that it was a more easily recognised local landmark. TfL stated that their policy is not to name new stations after individual roads in order to ensure geographical understanding across the whole Tube network. However, in recognition of local opinion and the wider recognition of the Vicarage Road name in association with the football club, they agreed to waive this rule. On 8 August 2013 TfL announced that they would name the station Watford Vicarage Road.

Vicarage Road and the Croxley Rail Link

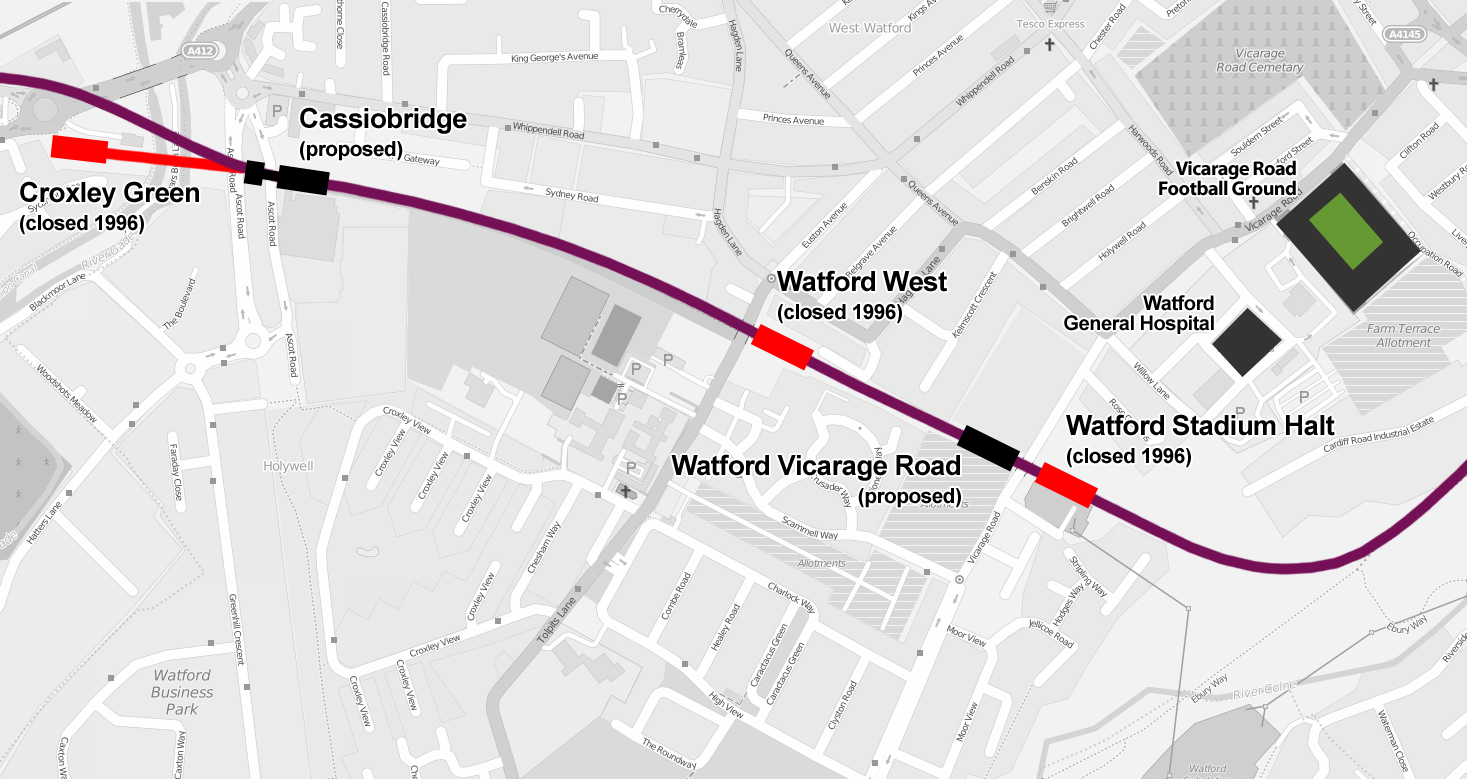
The former LNWR stations (closed 1996) and the proposed stations

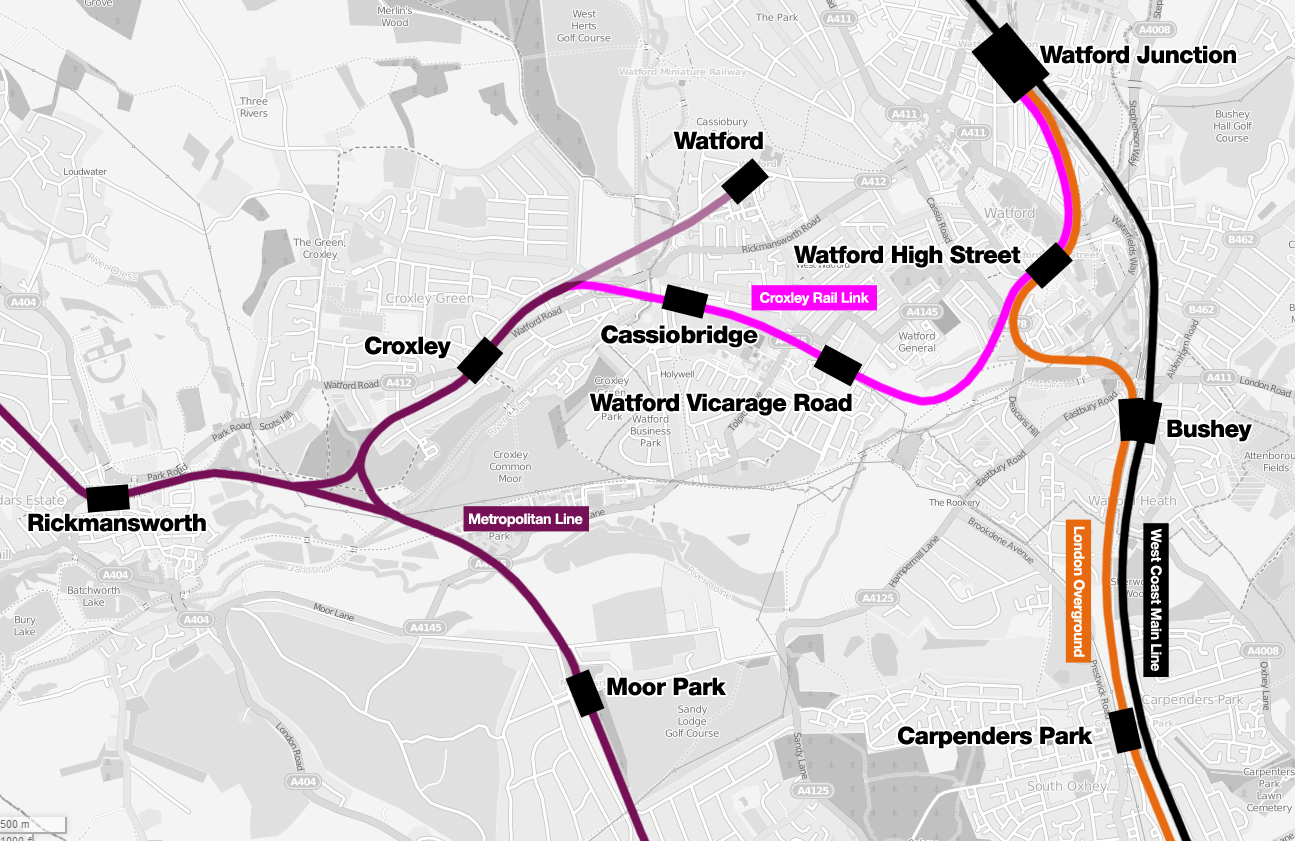
Map of the whole Croxley Rail Link project

Abandoned Croxley Rail Link plan
Preceding station	London Underground	Following station
Watford High Street towards Watford Junction	Metropolitan line Croxley Rail link	Cassiobridge towards Baker Street or Aldgate
