= Ebury Way =

Rail trail in Hertfordshire, England

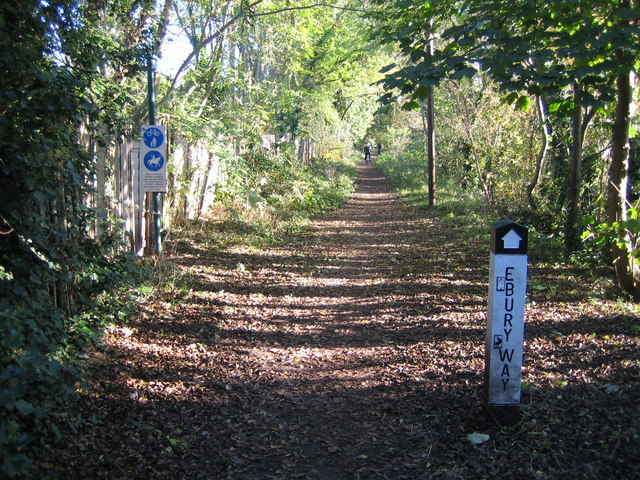
- Length: 3.5 mi (5.6 km)
- Location: South West Hertfordshire, England
- Trailheads: Rickmansworth, (Note: Location: 51.6365°N, -0.4657°W.) Watford (Note: Location: 51.6452°N, -0.4012°W.)
- Use: Walking, hiking, running, cycling and horseriding

The Ebury Way is a 3.5-mile (5.6 km) rail trail in Hertfordshire, England, between Watford and Rickmansworth. The route crosses the Grand Union Canal and three rivers: the Colne, the Chess and the Gade.

== Railway ==
The Watford and Rickmansworth Railway ran services between Watford Junction and Rickmansworth. The company was incorporated in 1860 and the line opened in 1862. The Rickmansworth branch was closed to passengers in 1952 and to freight in 1983.

The track was removed; the platforms and station buildings have been demolished. A considerable length of the trackbed now forms the Ebury Way.

== Description ==
Passing lakes and fields in Rickmansworth, the shared-use path is frequented by walkers and cyclists. Its origin as the Watford and Rickmansworth Railway means that it is wide and largely flat.

It forms part of National Cycle Route 61, which runs between Windsor to the south-west and Ware to the north-east. The Watford section of the Ebury Way, up to its crossing of the Colne, also forms part of NCR 6, so this section is jointly routed 6/61.

== See also ==
- List of rail trails
- National Cycle Network
- Segregated cycle facilities
- Sustainable transport.
