= Football Trust =

The Football Trust was a Government funded body to improve the safety of sports stadiums in the United Kingdom.

It was set up by the Labour Government in 1975, with the assistance of the pools companies and the English Football League. Its original primary purpose (when it was known as the Football Grounds Improvement Trust) was to assist with the costs of implementing the Safety of Sports Grounds Act 1975.

In October 1990, Chancellor of the Exchequer John Major reduced tax on the pools competitions such as "spot the ball" to help fund the trust.

It was chaired by Tom Pendry.

| Club | Grant (£) |
|---|---|
| Aston Villa | 3,476,361 |
| Blackburn Rovers | 3,453,437 |
| Chelsea | 4,402,949 |
| Coventry City | 3,465,131 |
| Derby County | 4,641,487 |
| Everton | 2,465,325 |
| Leeds Utd | 2,583,373 |
| Leicester City | 2,712,447 |
| Liverpool | 3,362,691 |
| Man Utd | 3,692,619 |
| Middlesbrough | 4,210,311 |
| Newcastle | 3,418,275 |
| Sheffield Wednesday | 4,299,086 |
| Sunderland | 4,454,354 |
| Arsenal | 3,072,167 |
| Bristol City | 2,328,531 |
| Nottingham Forest | 2,267,384 |
| Tottenham Hotspur | 3,519,216 |
| West Ham | 4,068,663 |
| Wembley | 2,057,253 |

The Trust was wound up in 2000 and replaced with the Football Foundation.
