= Rickmansworth (Church Street) railway station =

Former railway station in Hertfordshire, England

Rickmansworth (Church Street)
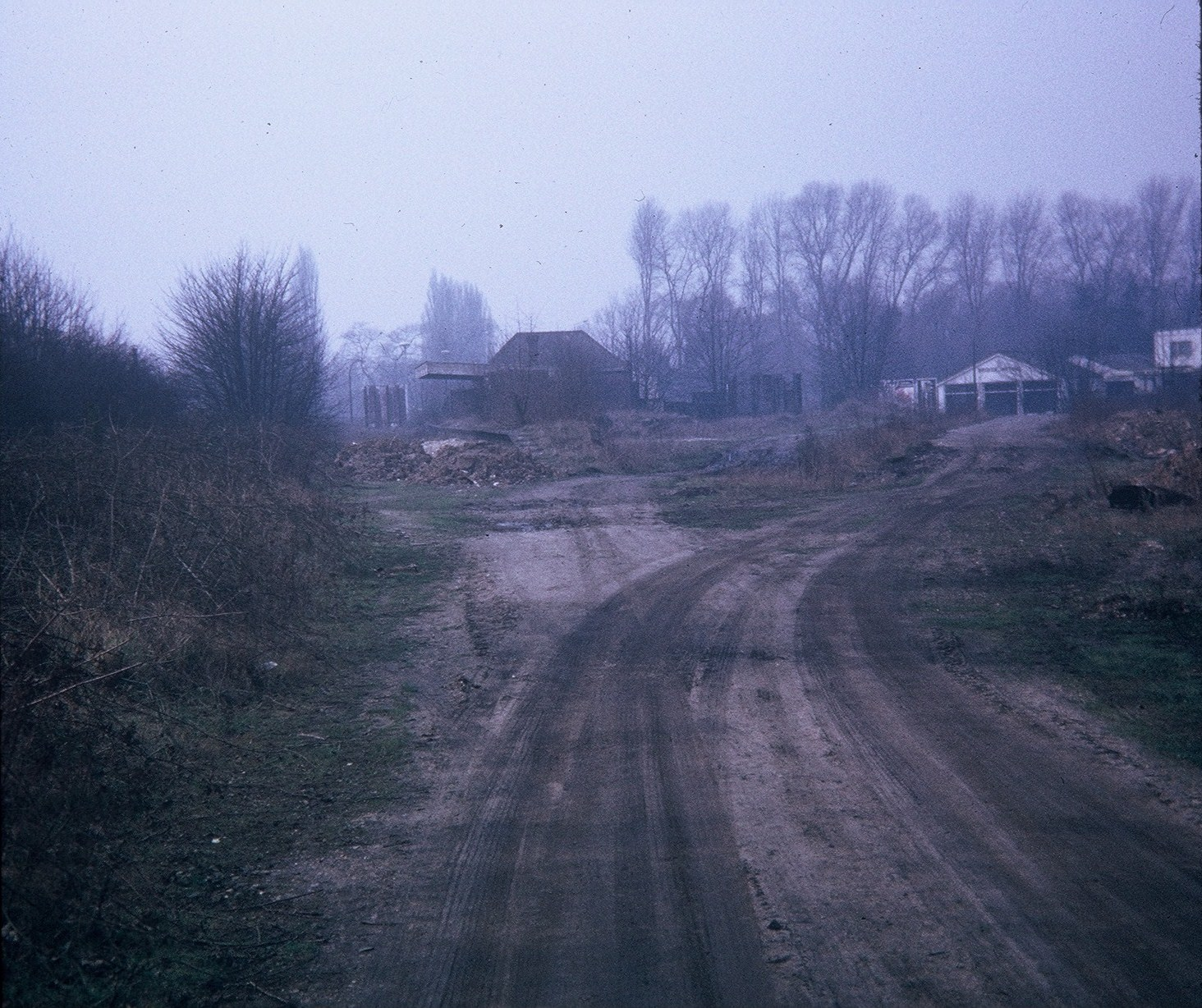
- Remains of the station, photographed from the east in 1972

General information
- Location: Rickmansworth, Three Rivers District, England
- Coordinates: 51.6359°N 0.4654°W
- Grid reference: TQ062941
- Platforms: 1

Other information
- Status: Disused

History
- Original company: Watford and Rickmansworth Railway
- Pre-grouping: London and North Western Railway
- Post-grouping: London, Midland and Scottish Railway

Key dates
- 1 October 1862: Opened as Rickmansworth
- 25 September 1950: Renamed Rickmansworth (Church Street)
- 3 March 1952: Station closed for passengers
- 2 January 1967: Closed for freight
Location

Rickmansworth (Church Street) was a London and North Western Railway (LNWR) station in Rickmansworth, Hertfordshire, England, between 1862 and 1967. The town continues to be served by Rickmansworth station, which lies 0.5 miles (0.8 km) to the north-west.

== History ==
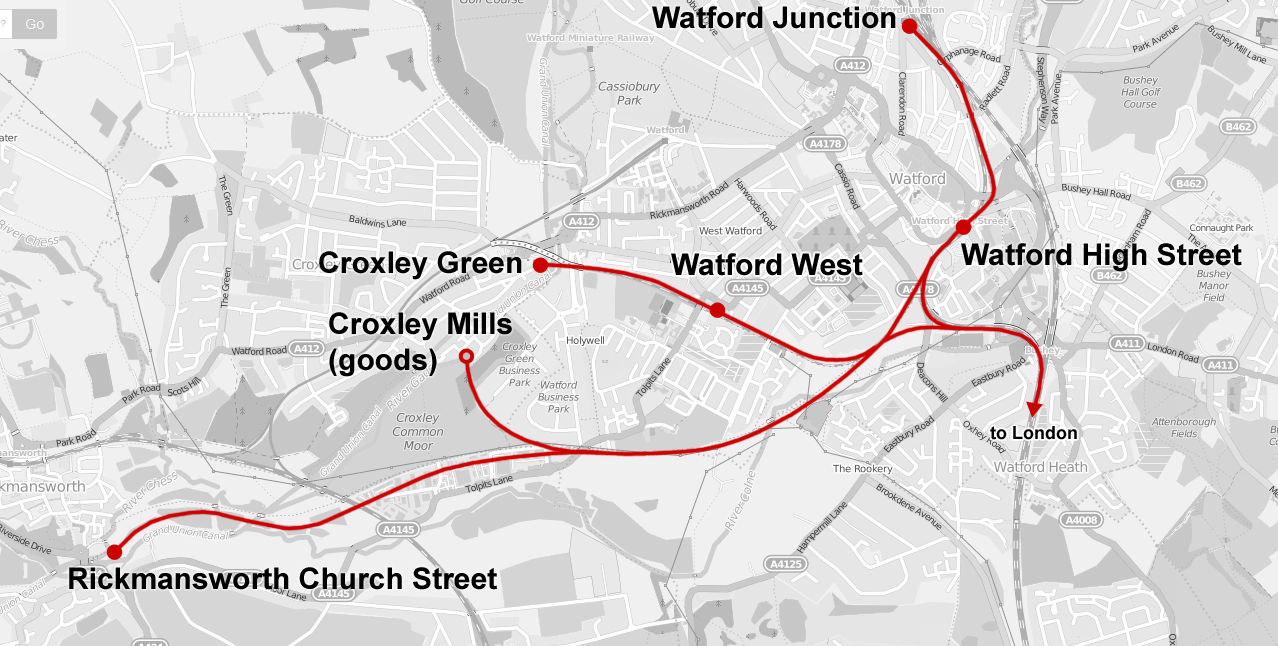
Map of the Watford and Rickmansworth Railway

Opened in 1862, it was the terminus of a 4.5 mi (7.2 km) branch line, which ran from Watford Junction.

Church Street station was the south-west terminus of the Watford and Rickmansworth Railway (W&RR), a business venture of the Whig politician, Robert Grosvenor, 1st Baron Ebury (1801–1893). It opened on 1 October 1862. The line ran from Watford Junction to Rickmansworth with many small freight branches, the most notable of which ran to Croxley Green.

Lord Ebury's plan was to extend the line south and to open a new railway to Uxbridge Vine Street on the Great Western Railway's Uxbridge branch. However, the GWR withdrew its funding for the scheme and line was never extended. The line failed to operate at a profit, the W&RR ran into financial difficulties, and eventually the operation was taken over by the London and North Western Railway in 1881.

In 1923, under the London, Midland and Scottish Railway (LMS), the Rickmansworth line and the service from Watford Junction to London Euston was converted to fourth-rail electric trains. The station was renamed Rickmansworth (Church Street) on 25 September 1950. It continued to be operated as a branch line from Watford by British Railways until the passenger service was withdrawn on 3 March 1952.

The station and tracks continued to be used for goods services until the line was cut back to one of the intermediate freight sidings 1967.

Preceding station	Disused railways	Following station
Terminus	British Rail; Rickmansworth branch	Watford High Street

== The site today ==
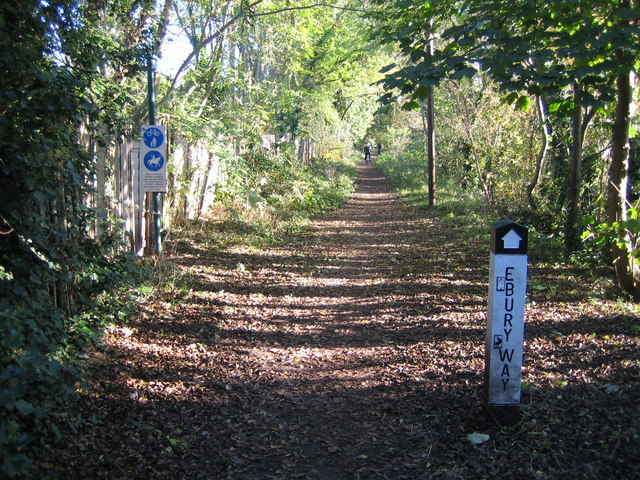
The Ebury Way, near to the station site

The track to Watford High Street has since been removed and the trackbed is now the Ebury Way rail trail. The platforms and station buildings have been demolished; the site is now occupied by social housing. A Premier Inn hotel now stands between the old station site and the canal.
