= Croxley Green railway station =

Disused railway station in Hertfordshire, England

Croxley Green
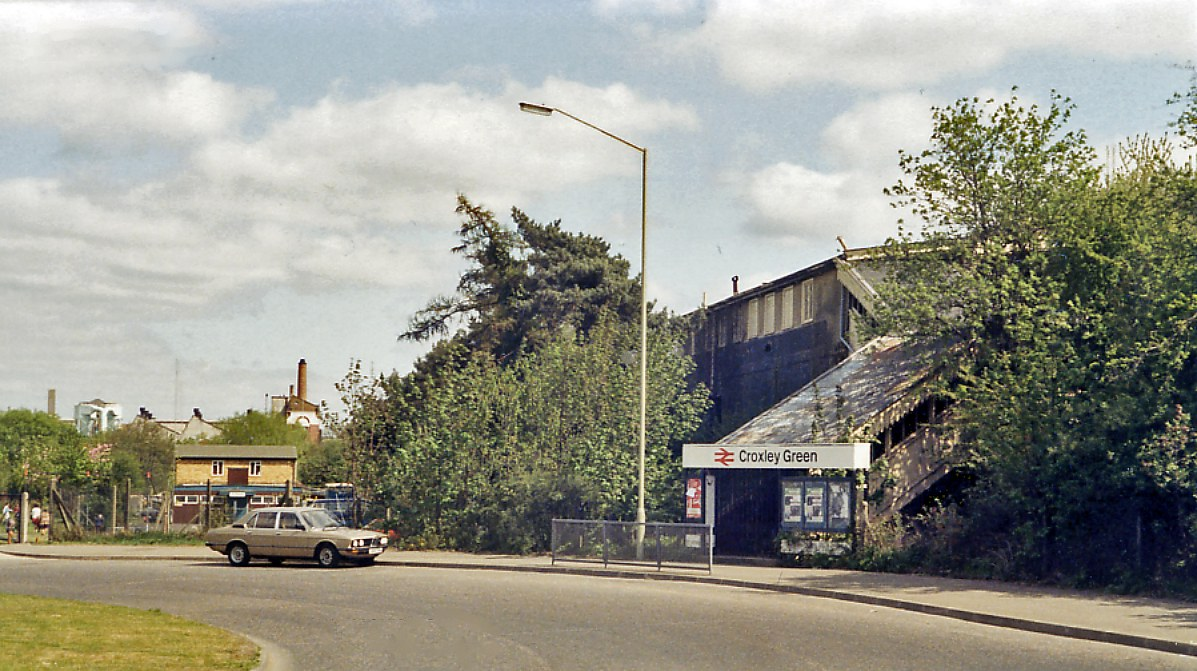
- Station approach (1984)
- Interactive map of Croxley Green

General information
- Location: Croxley Green
- Local authority: District of Three Rivers
- Number of platforms: 1

Railway companies
- Pre-grouping: LNWR
- Post-grouping: London Midland and Scottish Railway; British Railways

Key dates
- 15 June 1912: Station opened
- 22 March 1996: Services ceased
- 25 March 1996: substitute bus service commenced
- 29 September 2003: Official closure and withdrawal of bus service.

Other information
- Coordinates: 51°39′04″N 0°25′43″W

Croxley Green railway station is a disused terminus between Rickmansworth and Watford on the A412 road at the end of a short branch line. Work began on the line in 1908 in response to the growing influence of the Metropolitan Railway, with a new passenger service to serve the Grand Union Canal.

== History ==
The station was opened in 1912 by the London and North Western Railway as the terminus of the branch line of the Watford-Rickmansworth line. The original wooden station building was burned in the early hours of 10 March 1913 by a group of Suffragettes. A goods yard opened just to the east of the station shortly after, which by 1939 it was expanded and a loop constructed from the southern to the northern siding.

The London Midland Region of British Railways, and later Network SouthEast after sectorisation, continued to run services until the line's closure. Not far from the terminus, a depot was built to maintain BR trains, and for stabling 1938 tube stock Bakerloo line trains which closed in 1985.

Originally, there were some services direct to Broad Street and Euston. The station and branch line were earmarked for closure by the first Beeching report, but the proposal was refused. Instead, passenger services ceased on the southern curve of the triangle junction towards Bushey on 6 June 1966, the stretch eventually being lifted in the 1980s, so the shuttle to Watford Junction remained. A half-hourly daytime service was introduced to revive passenger usage on the branch line in 1988, however this was reduced to a parliamentary train service consisting of three return workings from 21 January 1991, later as a single return journey from 17 May 1993.

In 1989, the original platform was removed due to safety concerns and a temporary timber-framed platform was built on the other side of the track. This was followed by a temporary wooden stairway leading up to the tracks in 1990 to replace the dilapidated sheltered stairway.

The last train ran on 22 March 1996 and the line and station were closed, supposedly temporarily; the station furniture, including the lighting, the station and street-level signage, and the wooden platform remained in situ.

A section of the embankment just east of the Grand Union Canal bridge was removed to make way for a dual carriageway to improve traffic flow to the nearby business park. It was considered uneconomical to bridge the road, and so the station remains breached from the rest of the line. The Department for Transport authorised permanent closure in a letter dated November 2002. Both the station and the line were permanently closed on 29 September 2003. In 2005, the wooden platform was in a serious state of decay and was removed. The street-level signage was removed between August 2012 and May 2014.

Today, little of the station furniture remains and the station is almost completely overgrown. The original track is still in place, though all electrical equipment has been removed. The station gates have fallen into disrepair, and have been replaced with temporary security fencing. Steps up to platform level are still in-place with their handrails, alongside the faded Network SouthEast-red lamp posts. Access to the viaduct across the Grand Union Canal is restricted with permanent fencing and locked gates.

=== Croxley Rail Link ===
Plans were announced in 2005 for the Croxley Rail Link, which would to re-open the disused branch line as an extension of the London Underground Metropolitan line to Watford Junction. The plans did not include reopening Croxley Green, as a new stretch of track was planned to bypass the station, linking the line instead to the nearby Croxley tube station. Construction work began in 2014 but was halted in 2017 due to funding problems, and the scheme has since been abandoned.

Croxley Green and the Croxley Rail Link

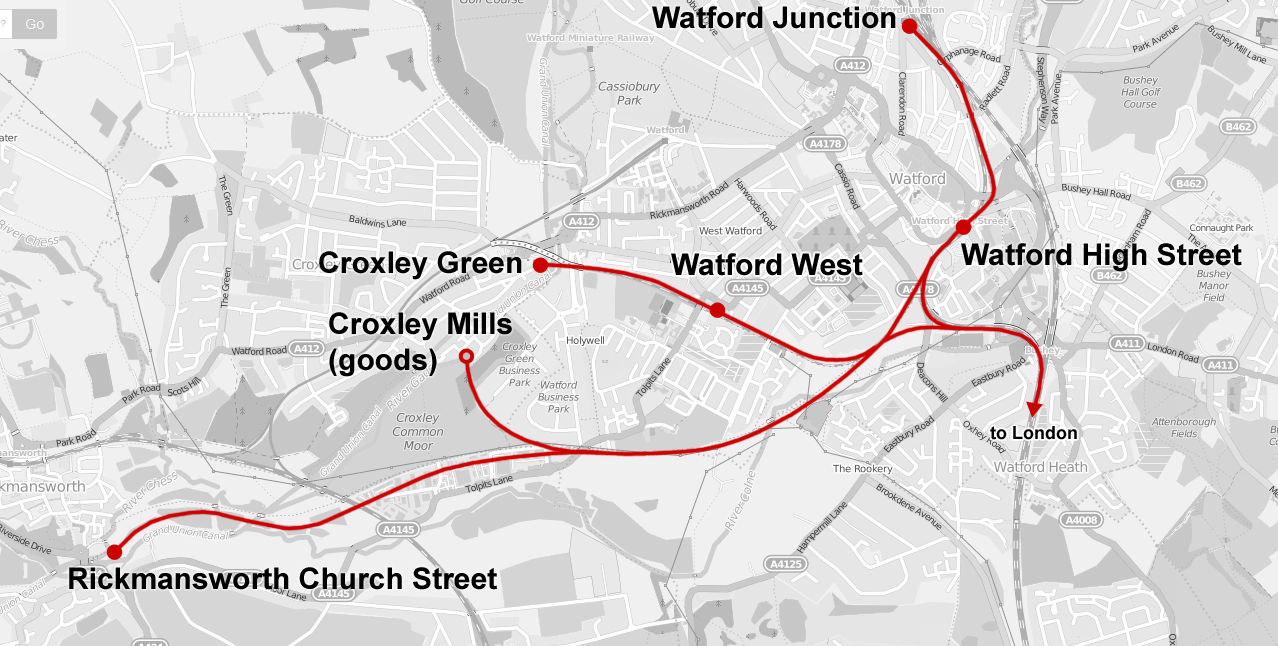
Map of the former Watford and Rickmansworth Railway/LNWR branch lines

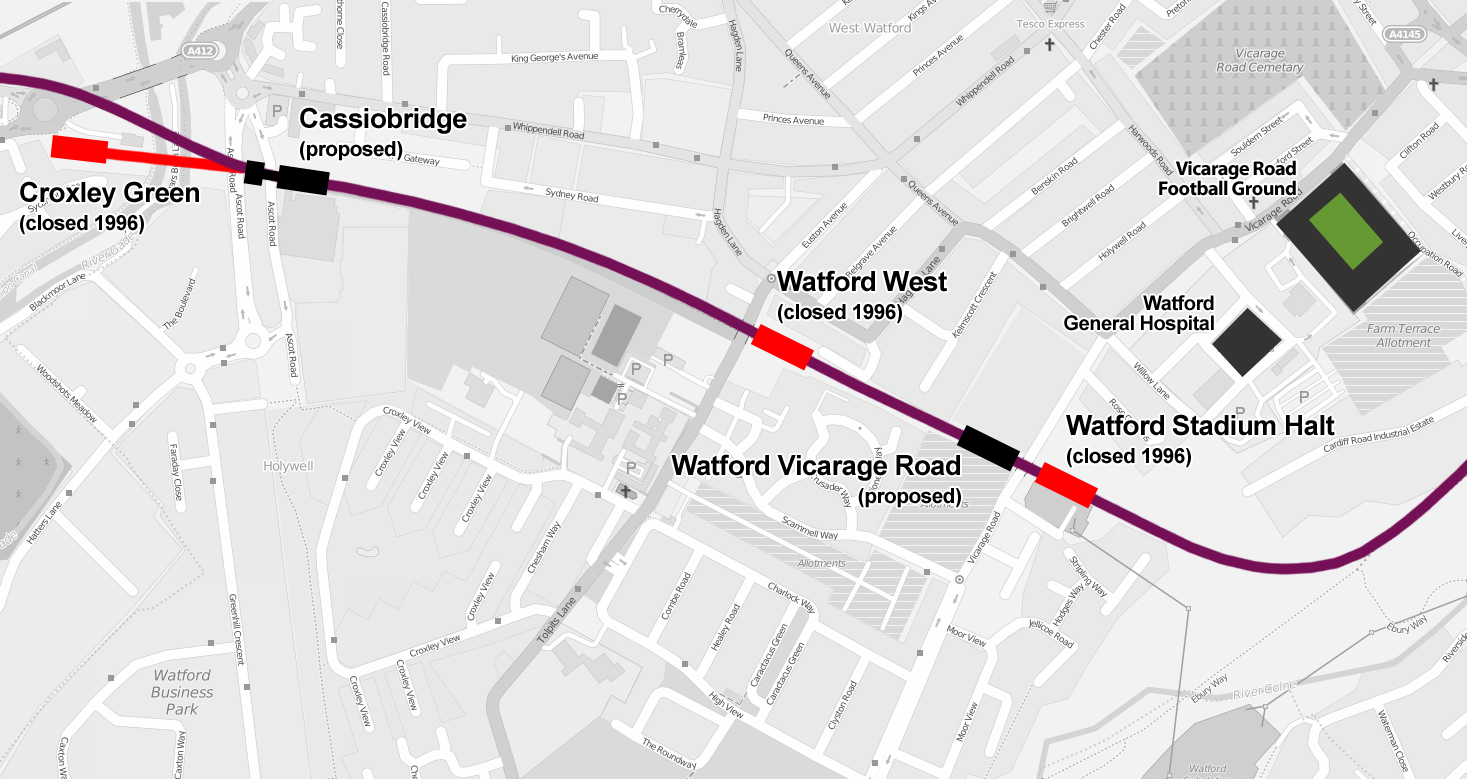
The former LNWR stations (closed 1996) and the proposed stations

Preceding station	Disused railways	Following station
Terminus	Network SouthEast; Croxley Green Branch	Watford West; Line and station closed
