= 2013 Bilderberg Conference =

Europe–North America forum in England

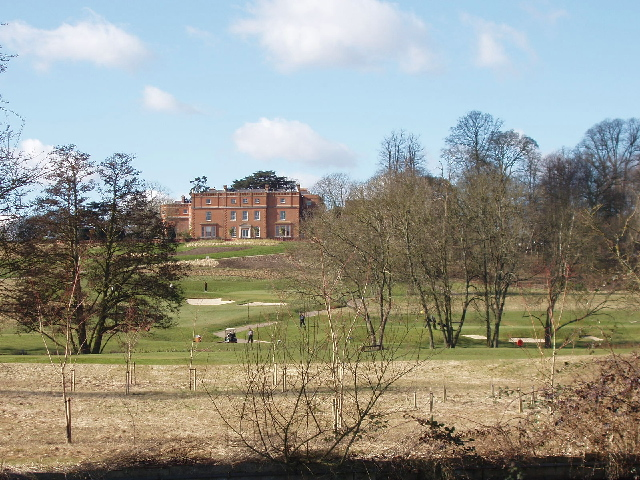
The Grove Hotel

The 2013 Bilderberg Conference took place June 6–9, 2013, at The Grove hotel in Watford, Hertfordshire, England. It was the first Bilderberg Group conference to be held in the United Kingdom since the 1998 meeting in Turnberry, Scotland.

== History ==
The Daily Telegraph likened the annual conference to "a political version of the World Economic Forum in Davos, Switzerland, which draws members of high society to discuss business and the economy." A British Member of Parliament and former Bilderberg attendee quoted by the Independent on Sunday also likened the annual conference to the World Economic Forum, and said it was "...not that exciting, in fact it's a bit run of the mill".

Around 140 participants are expected to participate in the meetings annually. Attendance to the event is by invitation only. No delegates pay to attend the conferences, and no delegates attend by conference phone or satellite. The conference programme never includes entertainment or performances.

The confidential nature of Bilderberg led to criticism of the group's lack of transparency and accountability, along with concerns about potential lobbying. Outside the 2013 meeting, Labour MP Michael Meacher said, "If there is any conference which required transparency, which required democratic accountability, it is the Bilderberg conference because this is really where the top brass of Western finance capitalism meet ... including government ministers." Conservative MP Douglas Carswell was also concerned about the privacy of the meetings, by saying "...you would have thought the least our ruling elite could do is discuss these issues in public."

There has also been speculation from conspiracy theorists about the purpose of the meetings. The secretive approach to staging the conferences has led to the younger generation of Bilderberg attendees being uncomfortable with the policy of total media exclusion, as reported by the Independent on Sunday. A previous attendee told the Independent that he sympathised with "those who tell us the confidentiality policy only encourages the conspiracy theorists. It does."

Of the format and outcome of the conference, the Bilderberg website said, "There is no detailed agenda, no resolutions are proposed, no votes are taken, and no policy statements are issued."

A Bilderberg Fringe Festival was held near the conference. The festival featured speakers, comedy, music, workshops, arts and entertainment.

The prime minister of the United Kingdom, David Cameron, attended the conference on 7 June. Cameron attended in a private capacity and was not accompanied by civil servants, even though it is customary for the prime minister to be accompanied by civil servants when he meets business leaders.

== Press coverage ==
Journalists were banned from attending the event, with the exception of Lilli Gruber, although a press office was provided by the Bilderberg Group. The group is represented by a German corporate communications firm.

The meeting was well covered by the British media, with frequent Bilderberg writer Charlie Skelton noting the presence of Reuters, the Associated Press, Channel 4 News, The Times and the Press Association.

== Agenda ==
A list of key topics for discussion at the 2013 Bilderberg conference was published on the Bilderberg website shortly before the meeting. Topics for discussion included:

- "Can the U.S. and Europe grow faster and create jobs?"
- "Jobs, entitlement and debt"
- "How big data is changing almost everything"
- "Nationalism and populism"
- "U.S. foreign policy"
- "Africa's challenges"
- "Cyber warfare and the proliferation of asymmetric threats"
- "Major trends in medical research"
- "Online education: promise and impacts"
- "Politics of the European Union"
- "Developments in the Middle East"

== Delegates (alphabetical) ==
For the first time, a list of expected delegates was published by the Bilderberg Group. Also listed below are their notable roles or then recent roles as of the time of the meeting (2013).

- Paul Achleitner, chairman of the supervisory board, Deutsche Bank
- Josef Ackermann, chairman of the board, Zurich Insurance Group
- Marcus Agius, former chairman, Barclays
- Helen Alexander, chairman, UBM plc
- Roger C. Altman, executive chairman, Evercore Partners
- Matti Apunen, director, Finnish Business and Policy Forum EVA
- Susan Athey, professor of economics, Stanford Graduate School of Business
- Aslı Aydıntaşbaş, columnist, Milliyet
- Ali Babacan, Turkish deputy prime minister for economic and financial affairs
- Ed Balls, shadow chancellor of the exchequer
- Francisco Pinto Balsemão, chairman and CEO, Impresa
- Nicolas Barré, managing editor, Les Echos
- José Manuel Barroso, president, European Commission
- Nicolas Baverez, partner, Gibson, Dunn & Crutcher
- Olivier de Bavinchove, commander, Eurocorps
- John Bell, Regius Professor of Medicine, University of Oxford
- Franco Bernabè, chairman and CEO, Telecom Italia
- Jeff Bezos, founder and CEO, Amazon
- Carl Bildt, Swedish minister for foreign affairs
- Anders Borg, Swedish minister for finance
- Jean-François van Boxmeer, CEO, Heineken
- Svein Richard Brandtzæg, president and CEO, Norsk Hydro
- Oscar Bronner, publisher, Der Standard Medienwelt
- Peter Carington, 6th Baron Carrington, former honorary chairman, Bilderberg Meetings
- Juan Luis Cebrián, executive chairman, PRISA
- Edmund Clark, president and CEO, Toronto-Dominion Bank
- Kenneth Clarke, Cabinet minister
- Bjarne Corydon, Danish minister of finance
- Sherard Cowper-Coles, business development director, international, BAE Systems
- Étienne Davignon, Belgian minister of state; former chairman, Bilderberg Meetings
- Ian Davis, senior partner emeritus, McKinsey & Company
- Robbert Dijkgraaf, director and Leon Levy Professor, Institute for Advanced Study
- Haluk Dinçer, president, Retail and Insurance Group, Sabancı Holding
- Robert Dudley, group chief executive, BP
- Nicholas Eberstadt, Henry Wendt Chair in Political Economy, American Enterprise Institute
- Espen Barth Eide, norwegian minister of foreign affairs
- Börje Ekholm, president and CEO, Investor AB
- Thomas Enders, CEO, EADS
- Michael Evans, vice chairman, Goldman Sachs
- Ulrik Federspiel, executive vice president, Haldor Topsøe
- Martin Feldstein, professor of economics, Harvard University; president emeritus, National Bureau of Economic Research
- François Fillon, former French prime minister
- Mark Fishman, president, Novartis Institutes for BioMedical Research
- Douglas Flint, group chairman, HSBC
- Paul Gallagher, senior counsel
- Timothy Geithner, former secretary of the treasury
- Michael Gfoeller, US political consultant
- Donald Graham, chairman and CEO, The Washington Post Company
- Ulrich Grillo, CEO, Grillo-Werke AG
- Lilli Gruber, journalist - anchorwoman, La 7 TV
- Luis de Guindos, Spanish minister of economy and competitiveness
- Stuart Gulliver, group chief executive, HSBC
- Felix Gutzwiller, member of the Swiss Council of States
- Victor Halberstadt, professor of economics, Leiden University; former honorary secretary general of Bilderberg Meetings
- Olli Heinonen, senior fellow, Belfer Center for Science and International Affairs, Harvard Kennedy School of Government
- Simon Henry, CFO, Royal Dutch Shell
- Paul Hermelin, chairman and CEO, Capgemini
- Pablo Isla, chairman and CEO, Inditex
- Kenneth M. Jacobs, chairman and CEO, Lazard
- James A. Johnson, chairman, Johnson Capital Partners
- Thomas Jordan, chairman of the governing board, Swiss National Bank
- Vernon E. Jordan, Jr., managing director, Lazard
- Robert D. Kaplan, chief geopolitical analyst, Stratfor
- Alex Karp, founder and CEO, Palantir Technologies
- John Kerr, independent member, House of Lords
- Henry A. Kissinger, chairman, Kissinger Associates
- Klaus Kleinfeld, chairman and CEO, Alcoa
- Klaas Knot, president, De Nederlandsche Bank
- Mustafa Koç, chairman, Koç Holding
- Roland Koch, CEO, Bilfinger
- Henry Kravis, co-chairman and co-CEO, Kohlberg Kravis Roberts
- Marie-Josée Kravis, senior fellow and vice chair, Hudson Institute
- André Kudelski, chairman and CEO, Kudelski Group
- Ulysses Kyriacopoulos, chairman, S&B Industrial Minerals
- Christine Lagarde, managing director, International Monetary Fund
- Kurt Lauk, chairman of the Economic Council to the CDU, Berlin
- Lawrence Lessig, Roy L. Furman Professor of Law and Leadership, Harvard Law School
- Thomas Leysen, chairman of the board of directors, KBC Bank
- Christian Lindner, party leader, Free Democratic Party (FDP NRW)
- Stefan Löfven, party leader, Social Democratic Party (SAP)
- Peter Löscher, president and CEO, Siemens
- Peter Mandelson, chairman, global counsel; chairman, Lazard
- Jessica T. Mathews, president, Carnegie Endowment for International Peace
- Frank McKenna, chair, Brookfield Asset Management
- John Micklethwait, editor-in-chief, The Economist
- Thierry de Montbrial, president, French Institute for International Relations
- Mario Monti, former Italian prime minister
- Craig Mundie, senior advisor to the CEO, Microsoft
- Alberto Nagel, CEO, Mediobanca
- Princess Beatrix of The Netherlands
- Andrew Ng, co-founder, Coursera
- Jorma Ollila, chairman, Royal Dutch Shell
- David Omand, visiting professor, King's College London
- George Osborne, British chancellor of the exchequer
- Emanuele Ottolenghi, senior fellow, Foundation for Defense of Democracies
- Soli Özel, senior lecturer, Kadir Has University; Columnist, Habertürk
- Alexis Papahelas, executive editor, Kathimerini
- Şafak Pavey, Turkish MP
- Valérie Pécresse, French MP
- Richard Perle, resident fellow, American Enterprise Institute
- David H. Petraeus, general, United States Army (Retired)
- Paulo Portas, Portugal minister of state and foreign affairs
- Robert Prichard, chair, Torys
- Viviane Reding, vice president and commissioner for justice, Fundamental Rights and Citizenship, European Commission
- Heather Reisman, CEO, Indigo Books & Music
- Hélène Rey, professor of economics, London Business School
- Simon Robertson, partner, Robertson Robey Associates; deputy chairman, HSBC
- Gianfelice Rocca, chairman, Techint
- Jacek Rostowski, minister of finance and deputy prime minister
- Robert Rubin, co-chairman, Council on Foreign Relations; former secretary of the treasury
- Mark Rutte, Dutch prime minister
- Andreas Schieder, Austrian state secretary of finance
- Eric Schmidt, executive chairman, Google
- Rudolf Scholten, member of the board of executive directors, Oesterreichische Kontrollbank
- António José Seguro, secretary general, Portuguese Socialist Party
- Jean-Dominique Senard, CEO, Michelin
- Kristin Skogen Lund, director general, Confederation of Norwegian Enterprise
- Anne-Marie Slaughter, Bert G. Kerstetter '66 University Professor of Politics and International Affairs, Princeton University
- Peter Sutherland, chairman, Goldman Sachs
- Martin Taylor, former chairman, Syngenta
- Tidjane Thiam, group CEO, Prudential
- Peter A. Thiel, president, Thiel Capital
- Craig B. Thompson, president and CEO, Memorial Sloan Kettering Cancer Center
- Jakob Topsøe, partner, AMBROX Capital
- Jutta Urpilainen, Finnish minister of finance
- Daniel Vasella, honorary chairman, Novartis
- Peter Voser, CEO, Royal Dutch Shell
- Brad Wall, Premier of Saskatchewan, Canada
- Jacob Wallenberg, chairman, Investor AB
- Kevin Warsh, distinguished visiting fellow, Hoover Institution, Stanford University
- Galen Weston, executive chairman, Loblaw Companies
- Baroness Williams of Crosby, Member of the House of Lords
- Martin Wolf, chief economics commentator, Financial Times
- James D. Wolfensohn, chairman and CEO, Wolfensohn and Company
- David Wright, vice chairman, Barclays
- Robert Zoellick, distinguished visiting fellow, Peterson Institute for International Economics

== Policing ==
A private security company provided security at the hotel; in addition, the Bilderberg Group agreed to contribute toward the policing costs of the event. The local police force, Hertfordshire Police, were in talks with the Home Office about a grant for potential "unexpected or exceptional costs". The grant is provided if the costs threaten the "stability of their policing budget". A combined force of Hertfordshire, Bedfordshire, and Cambridge constabularies prepared for the conference, with the assistance of specialist officers from the Metropolitan Police. Five rugby pitches belonging to the Fullerians RFC were hired by police for the duration of the event. The police operation for the Bilderberg conference was called Operation Discuss, and had been running for eighteen months prior to the start of the conference. The cost of policing was revealed after the conference to have been in the region of £1.3 million, with £500,000 having been offered to the police by the Bilderberg Group.

The mayor of Watford, Dorothy Thornhill, said she had concerns that the conference attracted "people who can and do cause violence and disturbance" but she was confident that the police could "minimise that and give them their right to protest". She was also "ambivalent about whether this is a good thing. It's potentially a positive thing as long as things don't kick off."
