= The Athenaeum Hotel =

Hotel in London, United Kingdom

The Athenaeum
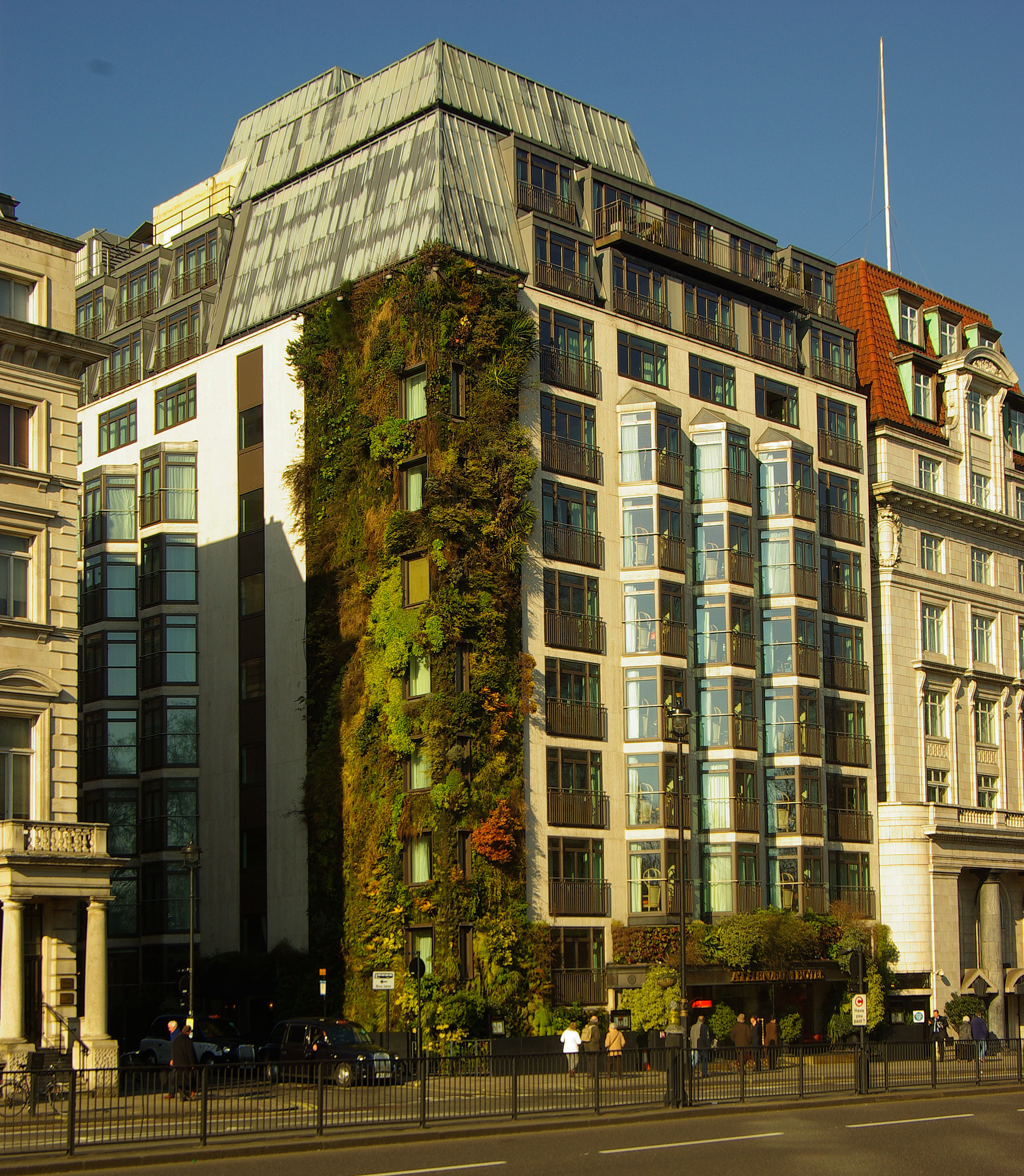

- Location within Central London

General information
- Location: 116 Piccadilly; London, England; W1J 7BJ
- Coordinates: 51°30′17″N 0°8′51″W
- Opening: 1973
- Owner: Sir Richard Sutton Estates
- Operator: Ralph Trustees Limited

Design and construction
- Developer: Rank Organisation

Other information
- Number of rooms: 162
- Number of restaurants: 1
- Parking: none

Website
- Athenaeumhotel.com

The Athenaeum is a family-owned five-star hotel overlooking Green Park in Piccadilly, London.

== History ==
Hope House was built at 116 Piccadilly in 1849–1850 by Henry Pelham-Clinton, the 6th Duke of Newcastle. The name Athenaeum first appears around 1864 when the house was bought by the Junior Athenaeum Club. The site was redeveloped in 1937, with the construction of an art deco apartment block, the Athenaeum Court.

In 1971, The Rank Organisation purchased the Athenaeum Court. It re-opened as The Athenaeum Hotel in 1973, after being gutted and rebuilt. The hotel attracted guests including Steven Spielberg, Marlon Brando, Harrison Ford, Lauren Bacall, Liza Minnelli and Warren Beatty, through Rank's Hollywood links. Rank encouraged the stars of its films (including Elizabeth Taylor) to take up residence at the hotel whilst working on projects in England. The Hollywood Reporter observed that there were more movie stars to be seen in London's Athenaeum than in the Polo Lounge of the Beverly Hills Hotel.

In 1992, the Athenaeum was purchased by Ralph Trustees Limited, a family-run business who also own The Grove in Hertfordshire and the Runnymede Hotel & Spa near Windsor.

Sally Bulloch was the Executive Manager for over twenty years. (Note: She was a child actress and her brother was Jeremy Bulloch best known for his portrayal of Boba Fett in the Star Wars original trilogy.) The current General Manager Joanne Taylor Stagg took over in 2019.

The Hotel has a dedicated Kid's Concierge service which takes care of children's needs and helps families to plan itineraries. The Athenaeum also provides age-appropriate toys to children upon arrival.

The nearest tube station is Green Park.

== Awards ==
The hotel has 5 red stars and 2 red rosettes from the AA.

The website travelandleisure.com put the Athenaeum in its list of the 500 best hotels in the world in 2008.

Afternoon tea at the Athenaeum has received an Award of Excellence from the UK Tea Guild for Top London Afternoon Tea 2008.
