= Ralph Trustees Limited =

British company

Ralph Trustees Limited is a family run private hotel group based in London, England, which was established in 1966 as Ralph Levy Trustees Limited. Its portfolio includes four hotels operating in the four and five star sector. Their hotels include The Grove (Hertfordshire), The Athenaeum (London), The Runnymede (Surrey) and 23 Greengarden House (London).
