= TeleAdapt =

TeleAdapt HK Ltd.
- Founded: 1992
- Founder: Gordon Brown
- Headquarters: HK, China
- Number of locations: USA, Hong Kong, China.
- Area served: Americas, Asia, Africa, Europe.

TeleAdapt Ltd. is a private, multinational company headquartered in Watford UK with operations in Americas, UAE and APAC. It provides guest connectivity solutions to the hospitality industry that enable hotel guests to use their mobile devices. Products include (1) Media Connectivity including MediaHub and RoomCast that provides wireless streaming of audio / visual content using Google Chromecast. (2) Power and USB Charging. (3) Audio and alarm clock radios with hotel specific features. (4) Ethernet connectors for wired and wireless hotel internet. Their guest-room connectivity solutions can now be found in over four million hotel rooms worldwide.[1]

== Organisational background ==
TeleAdapt was founded in 1992 by Gordon Brown. The name TeleAdapt is a portmanteau of telephone and adapter, as the company started by providing telephone adapters to business travellers. According to Brown, he was inspired to start the company after spotting a gap in the telecommunications market, and subsequently compiled the first complete list of foreign telephone plugs.

The company's headquarters have been located in Watford in Hertfordshire, since 2006. Six months after TeleAdapt's foundation, the company opened its first overseas office in America, and six months later opened another office in Australia. In 1993, TeleAdapt opened its third overseas office in Hong Kong. In 2003 the Dubai office was opened and TeleAdapt now has several offices in the United States, Hong Kong, China, UAE, Korea, and Philippines.

In October 2019, TeleAdapt is not operating anymore from the UK and MEA (Dubai Office). The USA and the China offices are active and they keep selling their products worldwide through a large resellers network.

== Honours and awards ==
- Ranked 50th in the inaugural Sunday Times International Track 100 in 2010
- One of 54 finalists in HSBC Business Thinking
