= Watford =

Town and borough in Hertfordshire, England

- Town, local government district, non-metropolitan district, borough
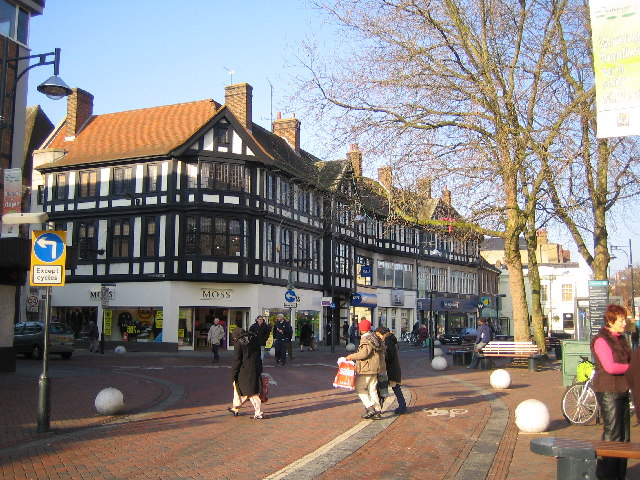
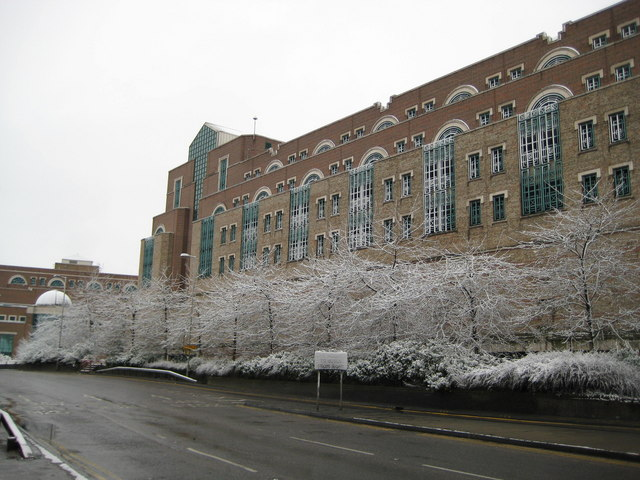
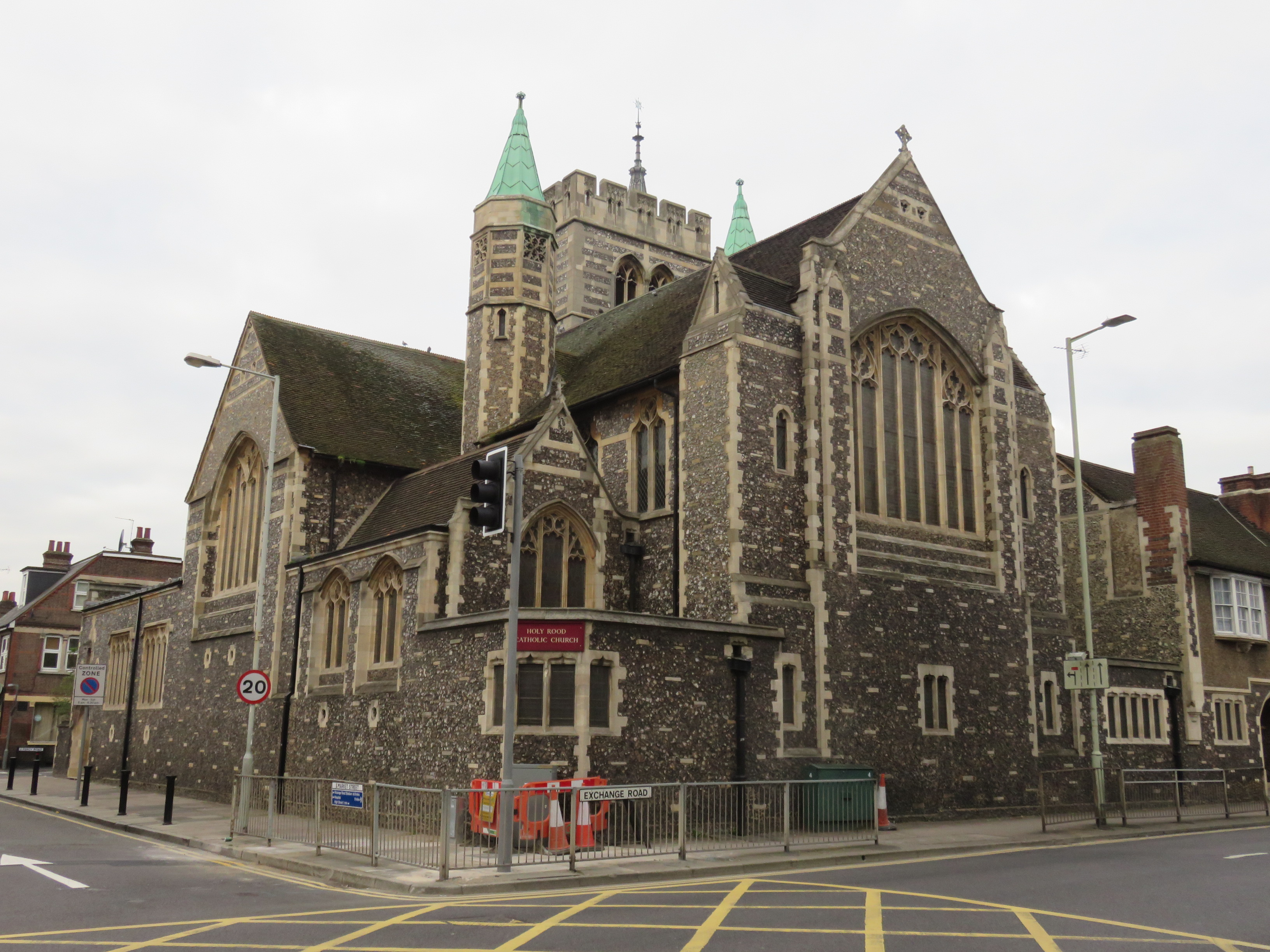
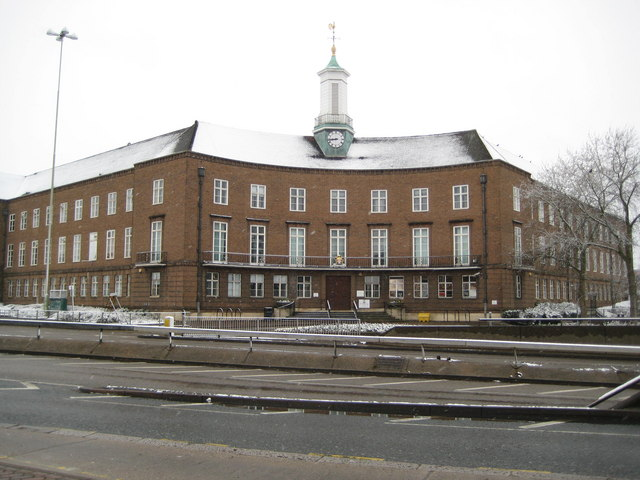
- From the top, Market Street, Harlequin Shopping centre, Holy Rood Church, Watford Town Hall

- Coat of arms
- Motto: Audentior (Be Bold)
- Watford within Hertfordshire
- Coordinates: 51°39′18″N 0°23′44.5″W
- Sovereign state: United Kingdom
- Country: England
- Region: East of England
- County: Hertfordshire
- Borough: Watford
- UK Parliament constituency: Watford

Government
  - Type: Non-metropolitan district
  - Governing body: Watford Borough Council
  - Elected Mayor: Peter Taylor (Liberal Democrat)
  - MP: Matt Turmaine (Labour)

Area
  - Borough: 8.301 sq mi (21.50 km^{2})
  - Rank: 289th
- Elevation: 233 ft (71 m)

Population (2025)
  - Borough: 107,658
  - Rank: 173rd
  - Density: 13,010/sq mi (5,024/km^{2})

229th
  - Ethnic groups: List: 60.9% White; 24.5% Asian; 6.3% Black; 4.7% Mixed; 3.6% other

Religion (2021)
  - Religion: List: 44.4% Christianity; 24.8% no religion; 17.8% other; 13% Islam
- Time zone: GMT
  - Summer (DST): UTC+1 (Summer Time (British))
- Postcode area: WD
- Area code(s): 01923 & 020
- Website: watford.gov.uk

Watford (/ˈwɒtfərd/) is a town and non-metropolitan district with borough status in Hertfordshire, England, 15 miles (24 km) northwest of Central London, on the banks of the River Colne.

Initially a small market town, the creation of the Grand Junction Canal during the Industrial Revolution encouraged the construction of paper-making mills, print works, and breweries. While industry has declined in Watford, its location near London and transport links have attracted several companies to site their headquarters in the town. Cassiobury Park is a public park that was once the manor estate of the Earls of Essex.

The town developed next to the River Colne on land belonging to St Albans Abbey. In the 12th century, a charter was granted allowing a market, and the building of St Mary's Church began. The town grew partly due to travellers going to Berkhamsted Castle and the royal palace at Kings Langley. A mansion was built at Cassiobury in the 16th century. This was partly rebuilt in the 17th century and another country house was built at The Grove.

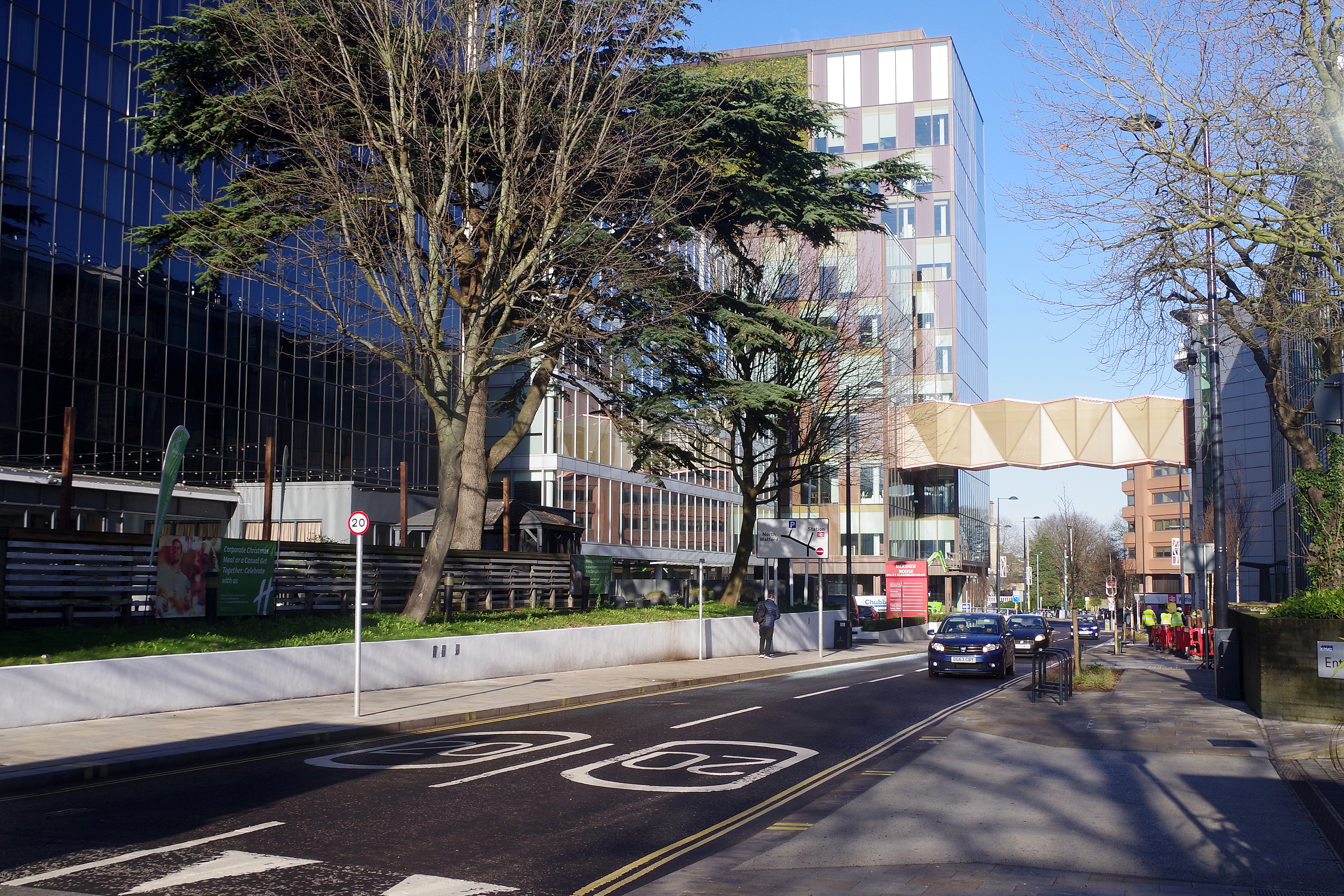
Clarendon Road

The Grand Junction Canal in 1798 and the London and Birmingham Railway in 1837 resulted in Watford's rapid growth, with paper-making mills such as John Dickinson at Croxley, influencing the development of printing in the town. Two brewers, Benskins and Sedgwicks, amalgamated and flourished in the town until their closure in the late 20th century. Hertfordshire County Council designates Watford to be a major sub-regional centre. Several head offices are based in Watford. International conferences and sporting events have also taken place in Watford, including the 2006 World Golf Championship, the 2013 Bilderberg Conference and the 2019 NATO summit which all took place at The Grove.

Watford became an urban district under the Local Government Act 1894 and a municipal borough by grant of a charter in 1922. The borough, which had 102,246 inhabitants in the 2021 census (up from 90,301 inhabitants at the 2011 census, an increase of 13.23%), is separated from Greater London to the south by Three Rivers District. Watford Borough Council is the local authority with the Mayor of Watford as its head – one of only 13 directly elected local authority mayors in England.

== History ==
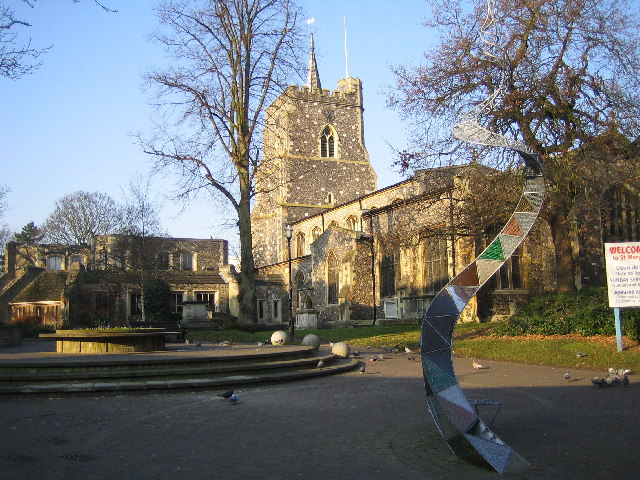
St Mary's Church, Watford

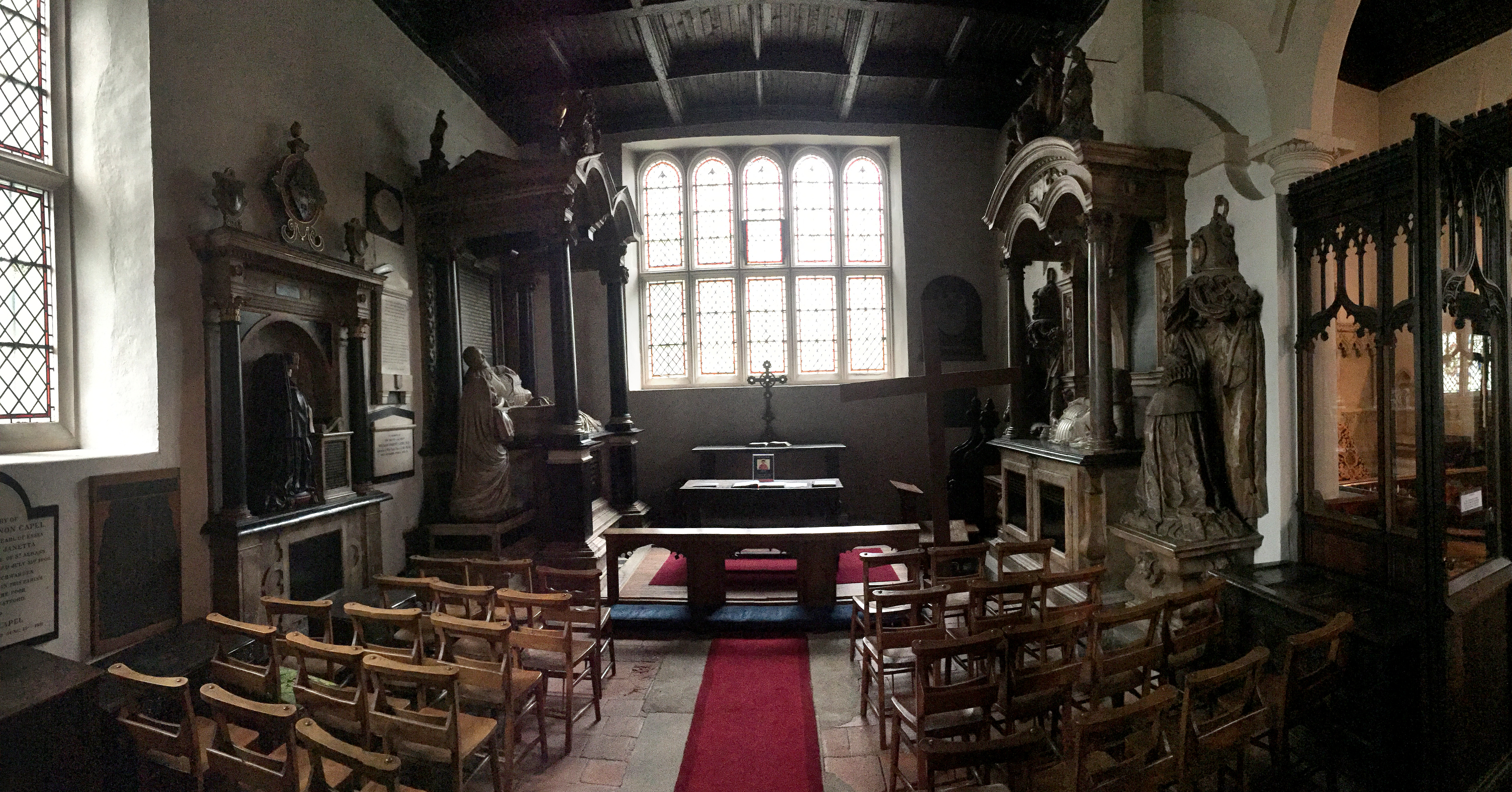
The Essex Chapel in Saint Mary's Church

=== Early history ===
There is evidence of some limited prehistoric occupation around the Watford area, with a few Celtic and Roman finds, though there is no evidence of a settlement until much later. Watford stands where the River Colne could be crossed on an ancient trackway from the southeast to the northwest. Watford's High Street follows the line of part of this route. The town was located on the first dry ground above the marshy edges of the River Colne.

The name Watford may have arisen from the Old English for "waet" (full of water – the area was marshy), or "wath" (hunting), and ford. St Albans Abbey claimed rights to the manor of Casio (then called "Albanestou"), which included Watford, dating from a grant by King Offa in AD 793.

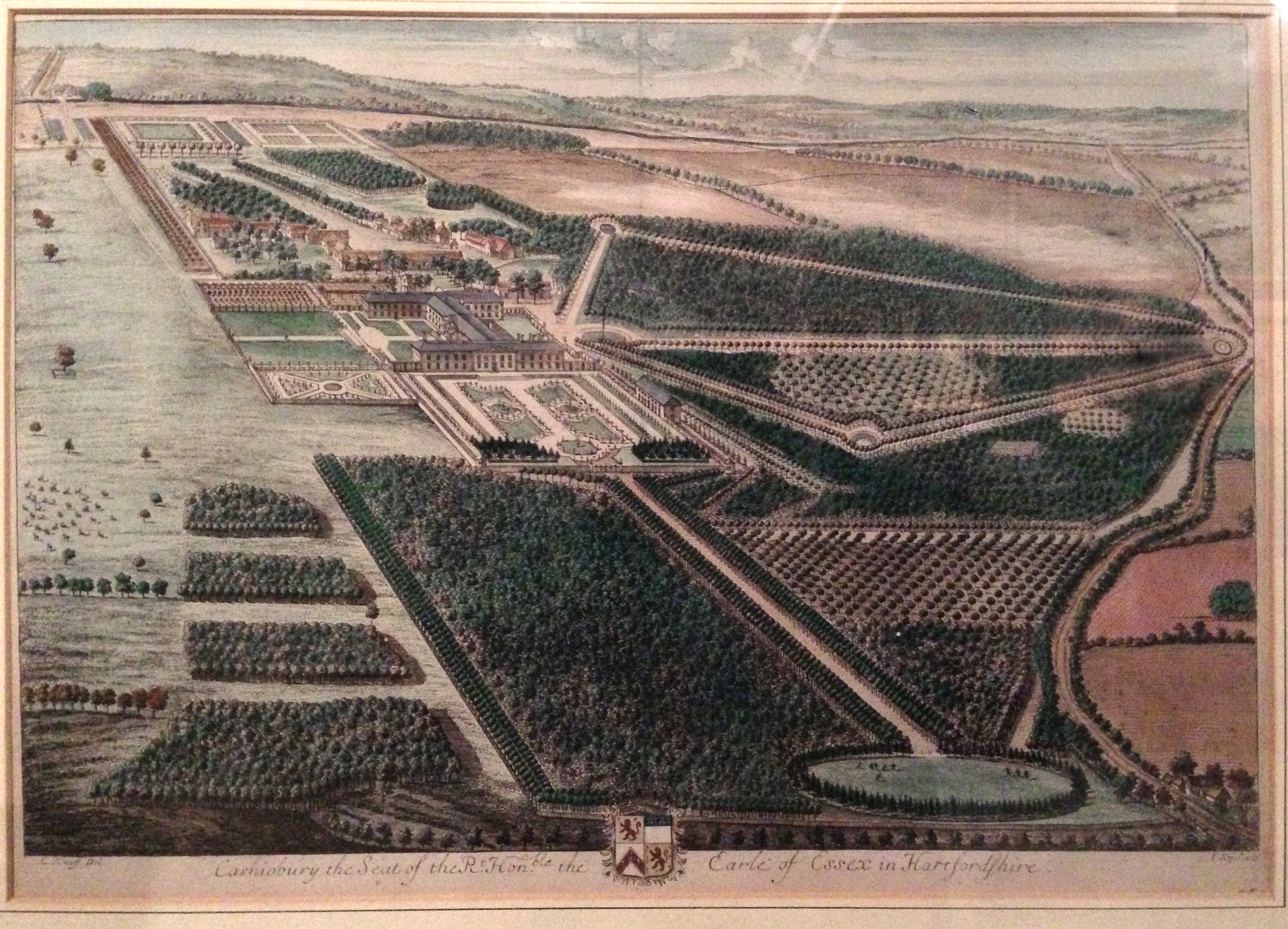
Cassiobury House Estate engraving by Johannes Kip and Leonard Knyff (1707) now in the Watford Museum

The name Watford is first mentioned in an Anglo-Saxon charter of 1007, where "Watforda" is one of the places marking the boundary of "Oxanhæge". It is not mentioned in the Domesday Book of 1086, when this area was part of St Albans Abbey's manor of Cashio. In the 12th century the Abbey was granted a charter allowing it to hold a market here, and the building of St Mary's Church began. The settlement's location helped it to grow, since as well as trade along this north–south through route it possessed good communications into the vale of St Albans to the east and into the Chiltern Hills along the valley of the River Chess to the west.

The town grew modestly, assisted by travellers passing through to Berkhamsted Castle and the royal palace at Kings Langley. A big house was built at Cassiobury in the 16th century. This was partly rebuilt in the 17th century and another substantial house was built nearby at The Grove. The houses were expanded and developed throughout the following centuries. Cassiobury became the family seat of the Earls of Essex, and The Grove the seat of the Earls of Clarendon.

Writing between 1724 and 1727, Daniel Defoe described Watford as a "genteel market town, very long, having but one street."

In 1762, Sparrows Herne Turnpike Road was established across the Chilterns. The toll road approximately followed the route of the original A41 road. The location of a toll house can be seen at the bottom of Chalk Hill on the Watford side of Bushey Arches; set in an old flint stone wall is a Sparrows Herne Trust plaque.

=== Industrial Revolution ===
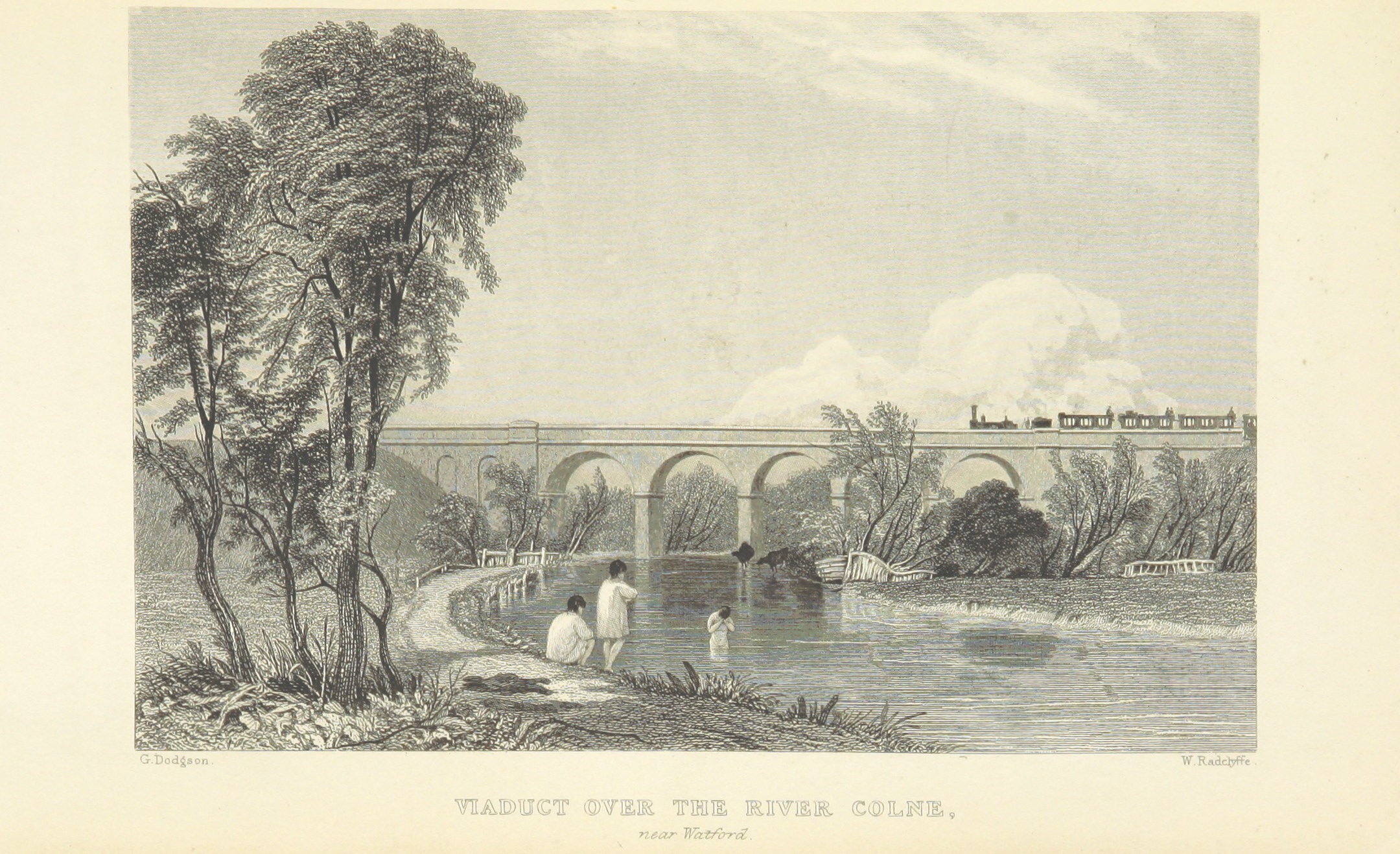
The London & Birmingham Railway, Watford (1839)

Watford remained an agricultural community with some cottage industry for many centuries. The Industrial Revolution brought the Grand Junction Canal (now Grand Union Canal) from 1798 and the London and Birmingham Railway from 1837, both located here for the same reasons the road had followed centuries before, seeking an easy gradient over the Chiltern Hills. The land-owning interests permitted the canal to follow closely by the river Gade, but the prospect of smoke-emitting steam trains drove them to ensure the railway gave a wide berth to the Cassiobury and Grove estates. Consequently, although the road and canal follow the easier valley route, the railway company was forced to build an expensive tunnel under Leavesden to the north of the town.

Watford's original railway station opened in 1837 on the west side of St Albans Road, a small, single-storey red-brick building. It closed in 1858 when it was replaced by a new, larger station at Watford Junction approximately 200 metres (220 yd) further south-east. The old station house still stands today; it is a Grade-II-listed building, now in the middle of a high density housing development, it and was for many years a second-hand car dealership. Watford Junction railway station is situated to the north east of the town centre.

These developments gave the town excellent communications and stimulated its industrial growth during the 19th and 20th centuries. The Grand Union Canal, allowed coal to be brought into the district and paved the way for industrial development. The Watford Gas and Coke Company was formed in 1834 and gas works built. The canal allowed paper-making mills to be sited at Croxley. The John Dickinson and Co. mill beside the canal manufactured the Croxley brand of fine quality paper. There had been brewing in Watford from the 17th century and, by the 19th century, two industrial scale brewers Benskins and Sedgwicks were located in the town. The parish church of St Mary's was extensively restored in 1871.

The town expanded slightly during this time. In 1851 a new street off the High Street was opened, King Street, followed by Queens Road and Clarendon Road in the early 1860s. During this time, Watford had a population of around 6,500 The railways also continued to expand from Watford during this period; the Watford and Rickmansworth Railway opened in 1862 as a short branch line via Watford High Street to Rickmansworth (Church Street), and another branch was added to Croxley Green in 1912. The original plan was to extend the Rickmansworth line south connecting Watford to Uxbridge; this scheme failed and both the Rickmansworth and Croxley branches closed.

Watford's population had risen to 17,063 by 1891 to become very cramped. Local landowners sold land for the development of the town and it was bought up by commercial interests. Various factories and other works sprung up in Watford, mostly breweries and prints, but also engineering works, a steam laundry, a cold storage company and a cocoa processing plant. The town expanded rapidly, most of the new inhabitants moving in from London.

=== 20th century ===
At the start of the 20th century the town was growing fast. New roads were laid out in Callowland, North Watford, and in West Watford on farmland. Many continued to live in the cramped and unsanitary houses in the yards and alley-ways opening off the High Street. Some of these people were among those who rioted in 1902 when the celebration for King Edward VII's coronation was postponed. The council had a programme of slum clearance which stopped with the outbreak of World War I in 1914. Building council houses resumed after the war and in the 1920s the Harebreaks estate was developed.

By the 1920s, printing had become the biggest industry in Watford. The biggest printers in the town were Sun Printers Ltd and Odhams Press. Watford was the biggest printing centre in the world and many advances in printing were made in Watford. During World War II the prints were taken over by the government who used them to print propaganda. After the war, the printing industry began going into decline. Union activity was common in Watford and advances in technology meant much of the industry became obsolete. Odhams Press closed down in 1978 and The Sun moved out of Watford during the 1980s after market reforms allowed it to do so.

In 1925, the Metropolitan Railway Company built a branch to Watford, opening a station close to Cassiobury Park.

In the 1950s and 1960s, Watford was the home of the British designer furniture manufacturer Hille. At their premises on St Albans Road, designed by the modernist architect Ernő Goldfinger, the designer Robin Day conceived the polypropylene stacking chair, now recognised as a classic of modern design. Although Hille left the area in 1983, the listed Goldfinger building still stands on St Albans Road. Mod culture found expression through clubs such as the Ace of Herts in the 1960s.

The de Havilland factory at Leavesden was responsible for the manufacture of the aircraft engines and later became Leavesden Aerodrome, to the north of Watford. No longer operational, it was converted into Leavesden Film Studios, now famously the home of the Harry Potter films.

== Geography ==
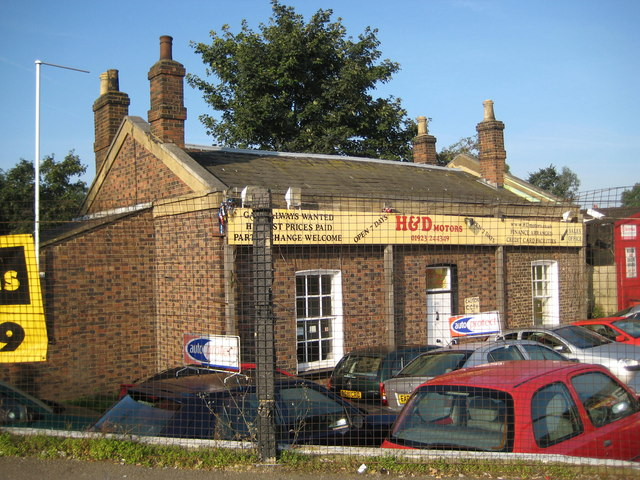
St Albans Road railway station (1837)

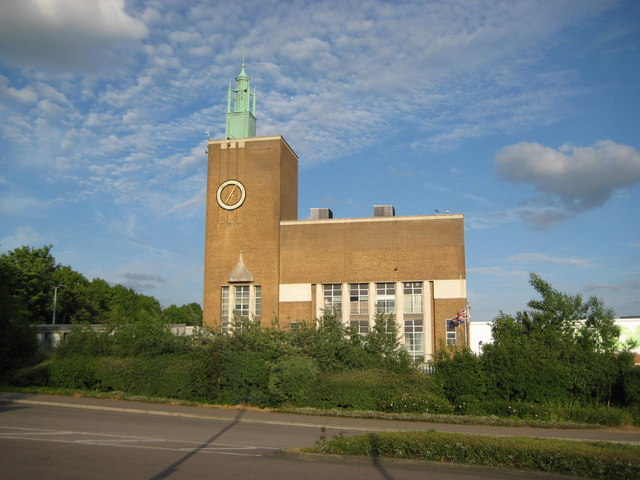
Odhams Press printworks Dome roundabout (1954)

Watford developed on the River Colne in southern Hertfordshire, England, 16 miles (26 km) northwest of central London. Ethnicity is 61.9% White British, 2.3% Irish, 0.1% Gypsy or Irish traveller, 7.7% Other White, 17.9% Asian/Asian British, 5.8% Black or Black British.

The borough had 102,246 inhabitants at the time of the 2021 census. The borough is separated from Greater London to the south by the urbanised parish of Watford Rural in the Three Rivers District. The Watford subdivision of the Greater London Urban Area, which includes much of the neighbouring districts, had a total population of 120,960 in the 2001 census.

== Religion ==
Religion in Watford(2021 census)
1. Christianity (44.5%)
2. No Religion (24.8%)
3. Islam (13.0%)
4. Hinduism (8.21%)
5. Not Stated (6.17%)
6. Buddhism (1.00%)
7. Judaism (0.92%)
8. Other (0.84%)
9. Sikhism (0.65%)

As of the 2021 census, Watford's religious profile roughly reflected that of England and Wales, with a larger Muslim and Hindu population than the average. The Jewish population accounted for 0.92% of residents in 2021 (down from 1.1% in 2011). Jewish communal life in Watford developed during the 20th century, with the establishment of the Watford & District Synagogue in 1946 and has since been supported by links to larger Jewish centres in nearby areas such as Bushey and Stanmore.

Area	All people	Christian (%)	Buddhist (%)	Hindu (%)	Jewish (%)	Muslim (%)	Sikh (%)	Other (%)	No religion (%)	Not stated (%)
England 2011		59.4	0.5	1.5	0.5	5.0	0.8	0.4	24.8	7.1
Watford 2011	90,300	54.1	0.7	4.8	1.1	9.9	0.6	0.5	21.4	6.7
England 2021	56,490,048	46.3	0.5	1.8	0.5	6.7	0.9	0.6	36.7	6.0
Watford 2021	102,246	44.45	1.00	8.21	0.92	12.97	0.65	0.84	24.78	6.17

== Governance ==
Watford has two tiers of local government, at district (borough) and county level: Watford Borough Council and Hertfordshire County Council.

Watford is one of only 13 local authorities in England headed by a directly elected mayor. Dorothy Thornhill was the first directly elected mayor of Watford, elected in May 2002 and re-elected in May 2006 and May 2010. She was the first female directly elected mayor in England and the Liberal Democrats' first directly elected mayor.

Since 1999 Watford has been divided into 12 wards. Each ward has three councillors who are elected for a four-year term. Under current local government reorganisation plans, all district councils in Hertfordshire, as well as the county council, will be abolished in 2028, with the district becoming part of a new South West Hertfordshire unitary authority.

Watford elects one Member of Parliament (MP) by the first past the post system of election, for the Watford constituency. Prior to the establishment of this constituency in 1885 the area was part of the three seat constituency of Hertfordshire.

=== Town twinning ===
The council have made twinning links with five towns. The first was Mainz, Germany, in 1956, and the most recent is Pesaro, Italy, in 1988; the others are Nanterre, Novgorod, and Wilmington, Delaware. The council award an honorary status of Freedom of the Borough to certain individuals "who have in the opinion of the council, rendered eminent services to the borough"; as of 2020 there are three freemen: Elton John, and two local councillors involved in the twinning process.

=== Administrative history ===
Watford
- Local Board District (1850–1894); Urban District (1894–1922); Municipal Borough (1922–1974)
- Population
  - 1891: 16,826
  - 1971: 76,705
- History
  - Created: 15 August 1850 (Local Board District); 31 December 1894 (Urban District); 18 October 1922 (Municipal Borough)
  - Abolished: 31 March 1974
  - Succeeded by: Watford Borough Council
  - HQ: Watford
- Contained within
  - County Council: Hertfordshire

The ancient parish of Watford was included in the hundred of Cashio. In 1835, Watford became the centre of a poor law union, and a workhouse was built in 1836–1837 at 60 Vicarage Road (then called Hagden Lane).

In 1850 a local board of health was established for the town. The local board district covered part of the parish of Watford and part of the neighbouring parish of Bushey. The Watford Local Board District came into effect on 15 August 1850, and the first board was elected the following month.

The local board was responsible for building the town's waterworks and sewers. For a time the board held its meetings at an upper room of the waterworks on Local Board Road. In 1891 the board purchased Upton House at 14 High Street for £2,650, converting it to become their offices and meeting place, holding its first meeting in the building on 1 October 1891.

Under the Local Government Act 1894, the Watford Local Board was reconstituted as Watford Urban District Council with effect from 31 December 1894. The act also stipulated that parishes could not be partly in an urban district and partly outside it. The old parish of Watford was therefore split, with the part of the parish outside the urban district becoming the parish of Watford Rural with effect from the first parish meeting on 4 December 1894. At the same time, the parish of Bushey was split, with the part within the Watford Urban District becoming a parish called Bushey Urban, which was later renamed Oxhey in 1906. Watford Urban and Bushey Urban / Oxhey were both classed as urban parishes and so did not have parish councils of their own, but were directly administered by Watford Urban District Council. The two urban parishes merged in 1935 to form a single parish called Watford.

Watford became a municipal borough on 18 October 1922 when it was granted a charter of incorporation. The council was granted a coat of arms on 16 October 1922, two days before it became a borough.

Upton House at 14 High Street continued to serve as the meeting place and offices for Watford Urban District Council and then Watford Borough Council until 1940. In 1938 work began on building Watford Town Hall at the junction of Rickmansworth Road and Hempstead Road, and the building officially opened on 5 January 1940. Upton House was subsequently demolished in 1961 and Gade House built on the site.

Under the Local Government Act 1972 Watford kept the same boundaries, but changed from being a municipal borough to a non-metropolitan district with borough status.

== Economy ==
Watford Shopping Centre entrance

Watford is a major regional centre in the northern home counties. Hertfordshire County Council designates Watford and Stevenage to be its major sub-regional centres, heading its list of preferred sites for retail development.

The High Street is the main focus of activity at night having a high concentration of the town's bars, clubs and restaurants. The primary shopping area is the Harlequin Shopping Centre, a large purpose-built indoor mall with over 140 shops, restaurants and cafes built during the 1990s, opened officially in June 1992. The owners of the shopping centre, Capital Shopping Centres, changed their name to Intu, resulting in The Harlequin changing name to "intu Watford" from May 2013. Carrying forward £4.5 billion of debt into 2020, the company was not able to survive the retail downturn due to the COVID-19 crisis, and went into administration in June 2020. The council owns part of the freehold the site, and feels that as the shopping centre is very popular (it was one of top 20 places to shop in the UK in 2019), it will remain open and viable.

The town contains the head offices of a number of national companies such as J D Wetherspoon, Camelot Group, Bathstore, Pepe's Piri Piri and Caversham Finance (BrightHouse). Watford is also the UK base of various multi-nationals including Hilton Worldwide, TotalEnergies, TK Maxx, Costco, JJ Kavanagh and Sons, Skanska, Vinci, Beko and TeleAdapt. Both the 2006 World Golf Championship and the 2013 Bilderberg Conference, took place at The Grove hotel. The town was home to the Scammell factory from 1922 until 1988. The site is now a residential area. Tandon Motorcycles, founded by Devdutt Tandon, were manufactured in Colne Way from 1947 until 1959.

== Parks ==
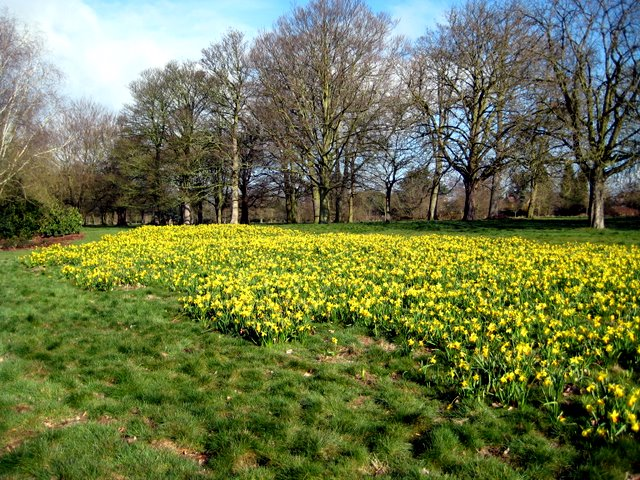
Daffodils in Cassiobury Park

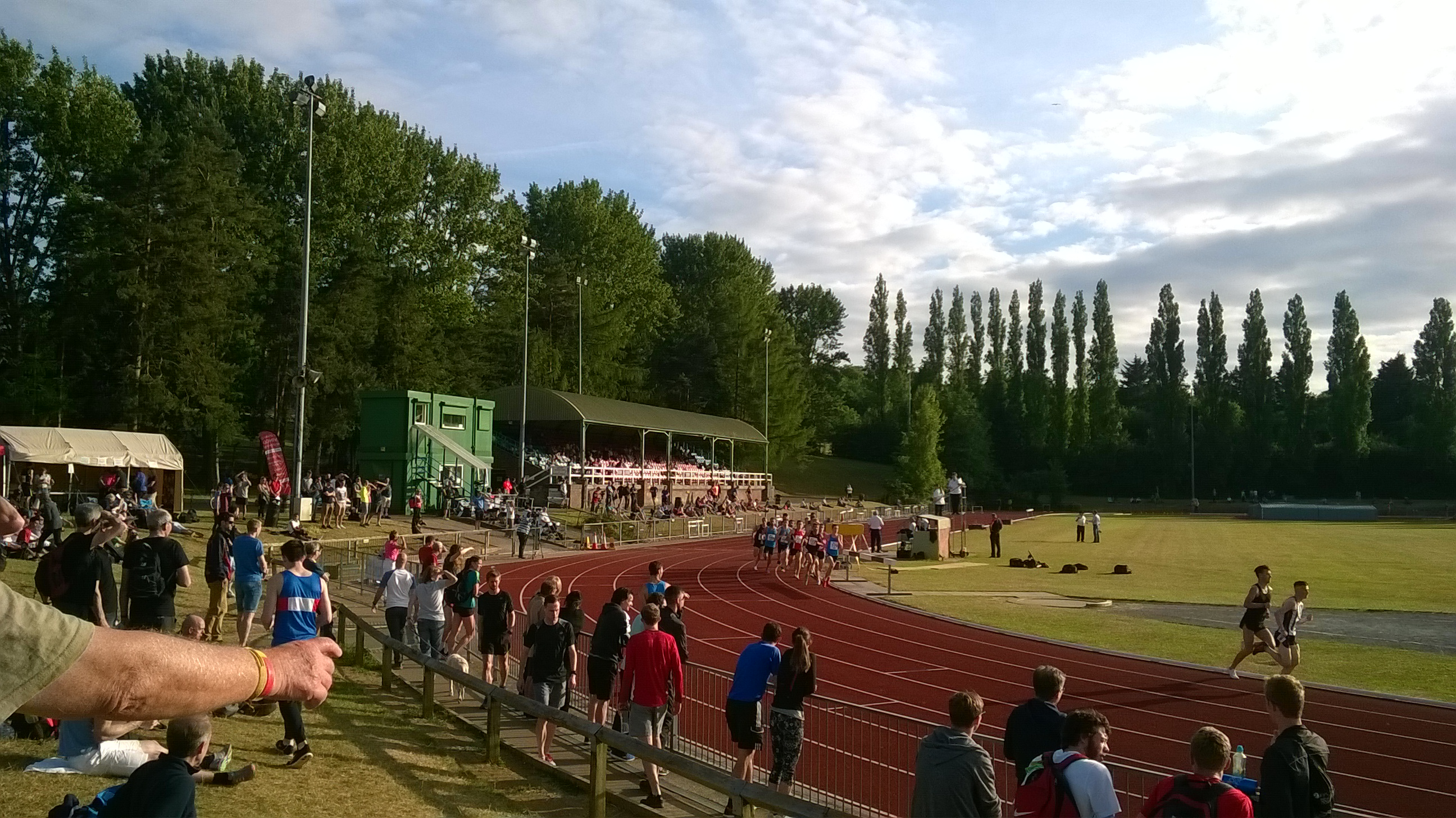
Woodside Athletics Stadium

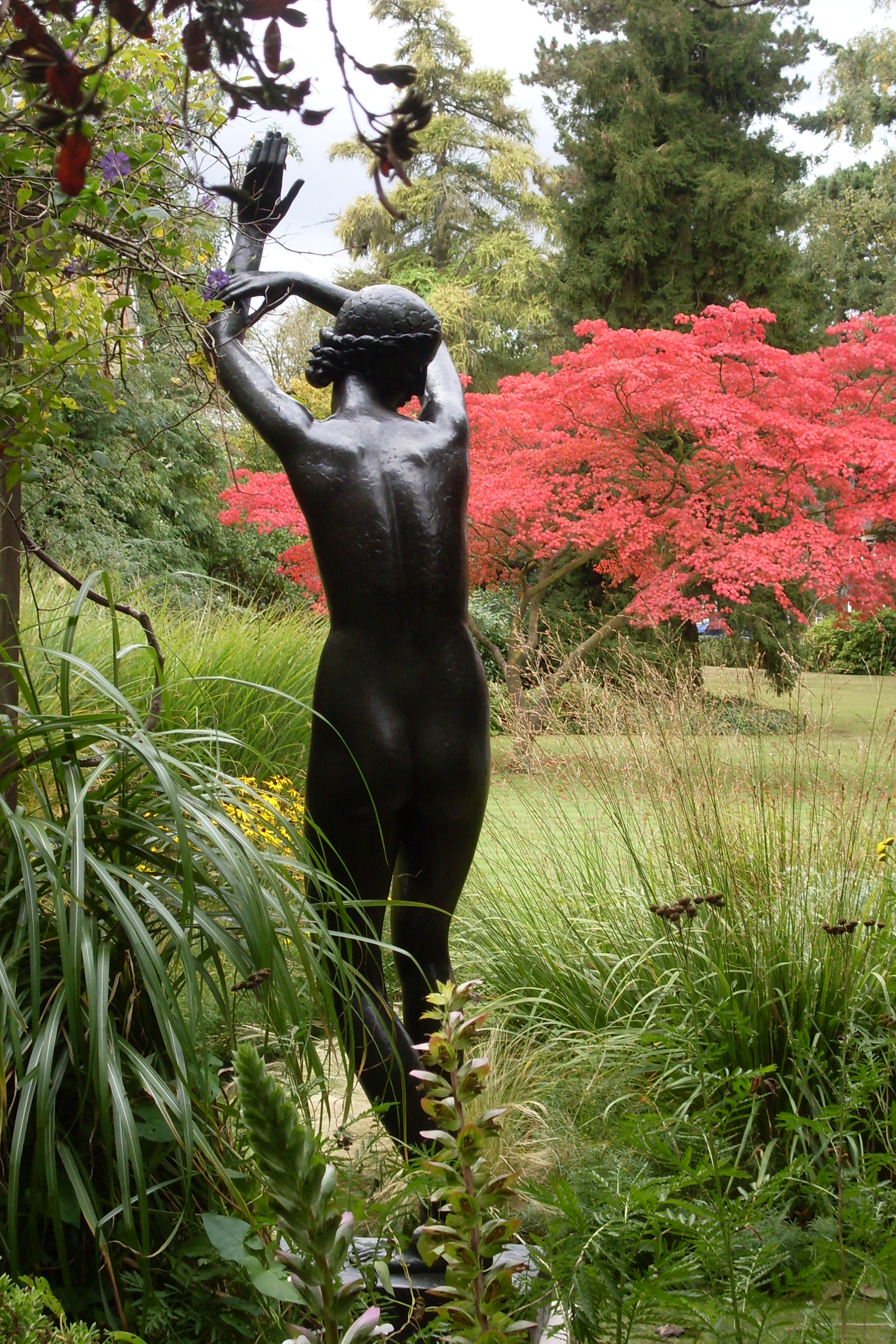
Cheslyn Gardens

=== Cassiobury Park ===
The name Cassiobury has had various spellings over time. It is derived from 'Caegshoe', which is believed to be the combination of 'caeg', a person's name, and 'hoe', meaning a spur of land. When the land was granted to Sir Richard Morrison in the 16th century, it was called 'Cayshobury', with 'bury' indicating a manor.

Cassiobury Park was formed from the grounds of Cassiobury House and consists of 190 acres (0.77 km^{2}) of open space. The house was demolished in 1927 and the Cassiobury Gates in 1970, for road widening. In July 2007, the park won a Green Flag Award, which recognises the best green spaces in the country. There is a children's play area, which includes a paddling pool, play equipment, a bouncy castle, an ice cream van, a kiosk where one may buy food, and 10.25" gauge miniature railway. The Grand Union Canal passes through the park. Cassiobury Park is host to the weekly 5k community event parkrun.

=== Cheslyn House and Gardens ===
Awarded Green Flag status since 2009, Cheslyn has been open to the public since 1965 as a formal gardens and house. The 3.5 acre gardens comprise a formal open area to the front and a semi-natural woodland area to the rear. Henry and Daisy Colbeck originally owned the house and gardens. Mr Colbeck was a renowned local architect, and designed Cheslyn House; he and his wife created the original gardens. The Colbecks travelled extensively, and this is reflected in the range of unusual and exotic plants in the gardens. Since the space has been open to the public it has been further developed, with new features added such as the pond, rock garden, large herbaceous borders and aviary.

=== Woodside Park ===
Awarded Green Flag status since 2011, Woodside Playing Fields cover approximately 59 acres of playing fields, sports facilities and woodland. The site comprises a range of sports facilities including an eight lane synthetic track and stadium, an indoor bowls green, a community centre, cricket squares, football pitches and Woodside Leisure Centre. Woodside Stadium is home to Watford Harriers Athletics Club and hosts national level events such as the British Milers Club Grand Prix.

== Heritage ==
There are 92 nationally listed buildings in Watford. These include St Mary's Church, which dates to the 12th century, and Holy Rood Church which dates to 1890.

St Mary's is noted for its interior which was renovated in 1850 by the architect George Gilbert Scott and includes fine oak pews decorated in the Gothic Revival style. It also contains the Essex Chapel, which served at the burial place of the nobility of the Cassiobury Estate, including the Earls of Essex. The chapel contains a number of large, ornate marble tombs and memorials dating from the 16th century and later, and was described by Pevsner as "the chief glory of Watford Church".

The Roman Catholic Church, Holy Rood, is a much later structure. Built in 1890 by John Francis Bentley, the architect responsible for Westminster Cathedral in London, it is noted as a particularity fine example of Gothic Revival architecture. The ornate interior contains stained glass by the designer Nathaniel Westlake.

Bushey Arches Viaduct is Grade II listed and was built in the 1830s by the London and Birmingham Railway. It crosses a traffic island at the bottom of the Lower High Street. A short distance north-west, the Colne Viaduct crosses the river on the outskirts of town, after which the railway enters Watford Tunnel; the south face of the original tunnels is ornately decorated and a listed building.

There are ten conservation areas in Watford; one Grade II Listed Park, and 240 locally listed buildings.

== Theatres ==
=== Watford Palace Theatre ===
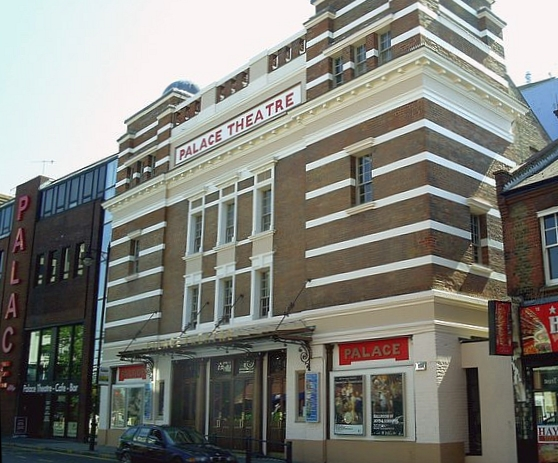
Watford Palace Theatre

The Watford Palace Theatre opened in 1908 and is the only producing theatre in Hertfordshire. It presents an annual traditional pantomime, world premières, dance and family shows. Situated just off the High Street, the Edwardian 600-seat theatre underwent a refurbishment in 2004. The Palace houses its own rehearsal room, wardrobe, café and bar. It also shows films and 'live' and 'as live' streams of opera and ballet during its theatre season.

=== Pump House ===
The Pump House Theatre and Arts Centre is based in an old pumping station situated just off the Lower High Street. The building was converted for use as a theatre, with rehearsal rooms, and meeting place for local arts based groups. Current facilities include a 124-seat theatre, rehearsal rooms, and live music venue. Community groups currently meeting at the Pump House include Dance House (children's ballet), Pump House Clog Morris (women's Morris dancing), Pump House Jazz (jazz club), Open House (live open mic music), Woodside Morris Men (men's Morris dancing), child, youth and adult theatre groups and also the Giggle Inn comedy club. In 2018, the venue hosted the inaugural Watford Short Film Festival alongside Watford Museum.

=== Watford Colosseum ===
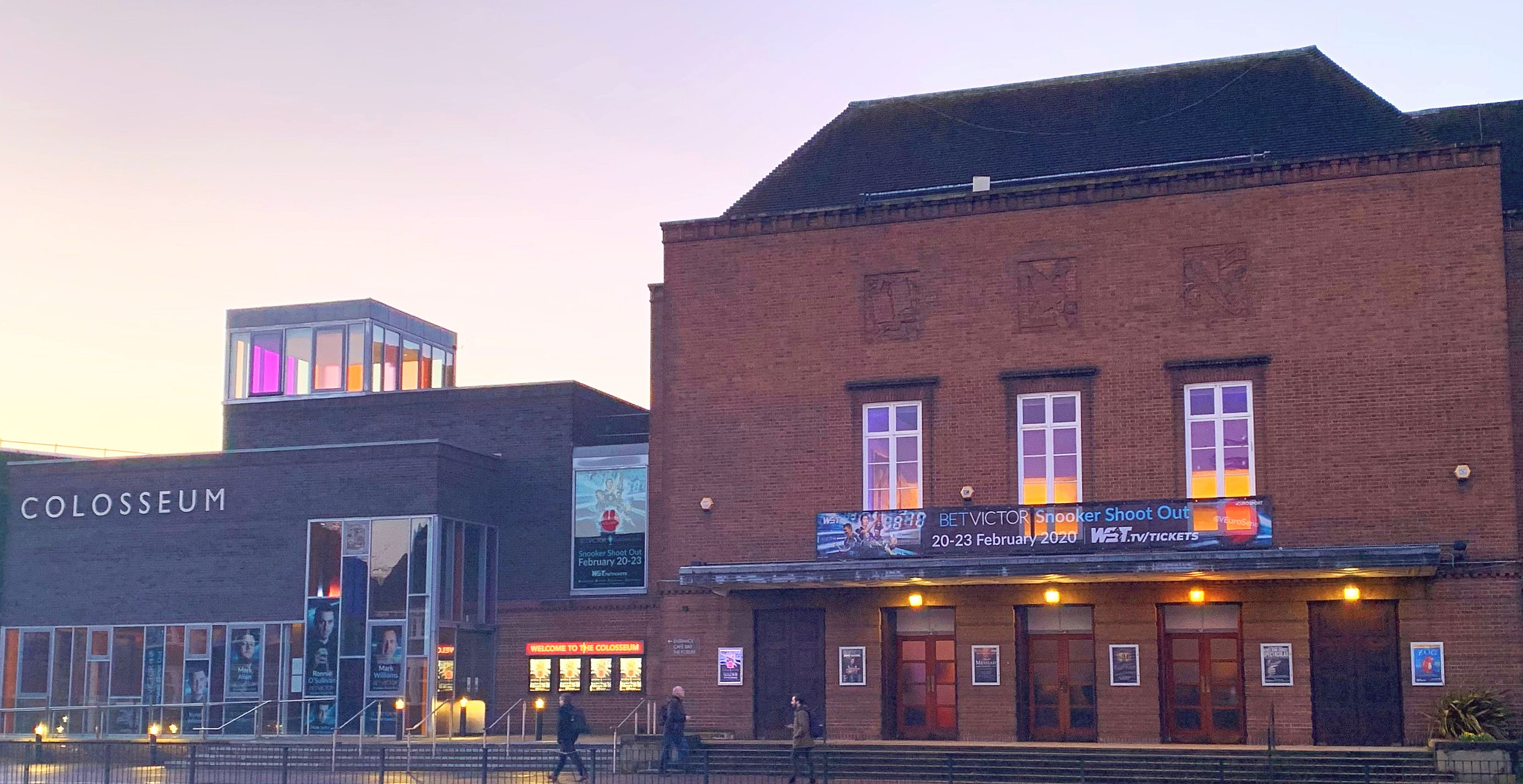
Watford Colosseum was the venue for the Snooker Shoot Out from 2017–2020.

Watford Colosseum is an entertainment venue in the town. Established in 1938, as the Assembly Rooms for Watford Town Hall, the complex was extended in 2011 with improvements which included new meeting spaces, a new restaurant and new bar facilities. Performers at the venue have included the soprano Maria Callas in September 1954 and the tenor Luciano Pavarotti in June 1995. The Colosseum has been used to record various film soundtracks and is regularly used to host concerts by the BBC Concert Orchestra, including Friday Night is Music Night. It has also housed performances by performers including The Who, Robbie Williams, and Oasis.

The Colosseum is also an important venue for boxing matches with heavyweight boxer Tyson Fury building on his reputation, shortly after turning professional, in 2009. The venue also has seen some important and highly popular plays taking place and it regularly holds events in support of charities. The 2020 Snooker Shoot Out professional snooker tournament was held at the Colosseum between 20 and 23 February 2020.

== Museums ==
The Museum of Watford holds a collection of fine art and sculpture which includes works by J. M. W. Turner, Sir Joshua Reynolds, William Blake and Jacob Epstein. The museum also hold special collections related to the Cassiobury Estate, Watford Football Club, and local heritage, as well as an archive collection of documents, printed ephemera, photographs and diaries related to Watford townsfolk, local government, nobility and businesses. Until 2023, it was housed in a former brewery building on the Lower High Street, but is now temporarily closed while the collection is relocated to Watford Town Hall. The museum is planned to reopen to the public by 2026/2027.

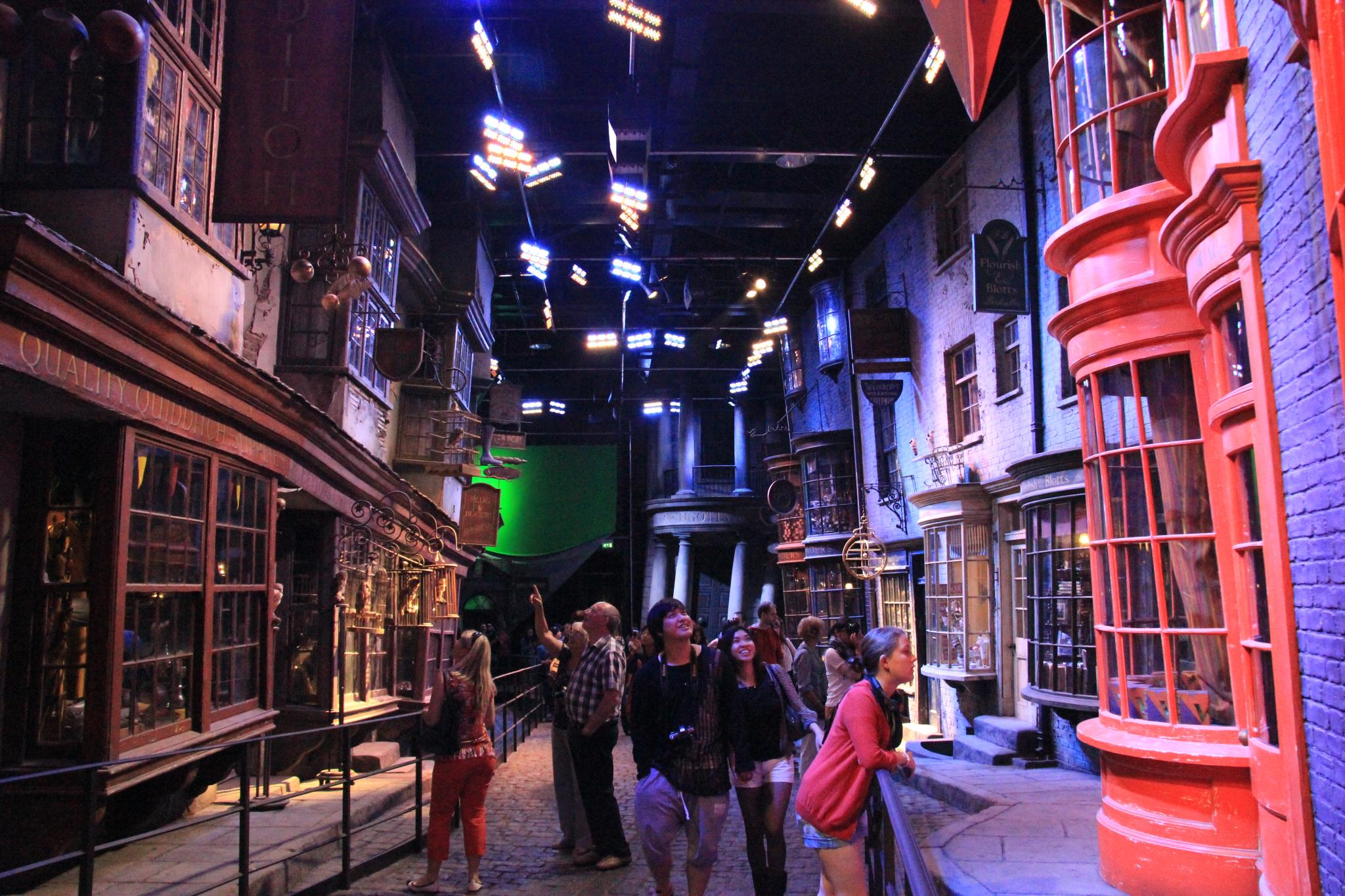
Making of Harry Potter studio tour at Leavesden

The Hertfordshire Fire Museum is dedicated to the history of firefighting in the county. It is based in a purpose-built building at Watford Fire Station. The Museum includes a wide range of vehicles, equipment, uniforms and archive material.

Warner Bros. Studios Leavesden is an 80-hectare film studio complex which has been used for a wide range of Hollywood film productions. Part of the site is open to the public and houses the Warner Bros. Studio Tour London – The Making of Harry Potter, displaying costumes and sets from the Harry Potter films which were produced at Leavesden. The studio complex is to the north of the borough, around 2.5 miles (4.0 km) from the town centre, and a special shuttle bus provides a connection from Watford Junction station to the studios.

== Transport ==
=== Road ===
Watford is located 15 miles (24 km) north-west of central London. Post World War II road-building has resulted in Watford being close to several motorway junctions on both the M1 motorway and the M25 London Orbital Motorway.

=== Buses ===
Watford is served by a number of different bus operators, including Arriva Kent Thameside, Arriva Shires & Essex, Carousel, London Sovereign, Lucketts of Watford, Mullanys Coaches, Red Eagle Buses, Red Rose Travel, Sullivan Buses, Uno and Vale Travel. Oyster Cards are accepted on TfL routes 142 (towards Brent Cross) and 258 (towards Harrow) into London. Intalink Explorer and Hertfordshire SaverCard are accepted on all but the London Bus routes.

The hourly Green Line bus route 724 connects Watford Junction station and the town centre to London Heathrow Airport on weekdays, with a service once every two hours at weekends and on bank holidays. Regular bus services run between Watford and Luton, but not directly to Luton Airport.

=== Railway ===
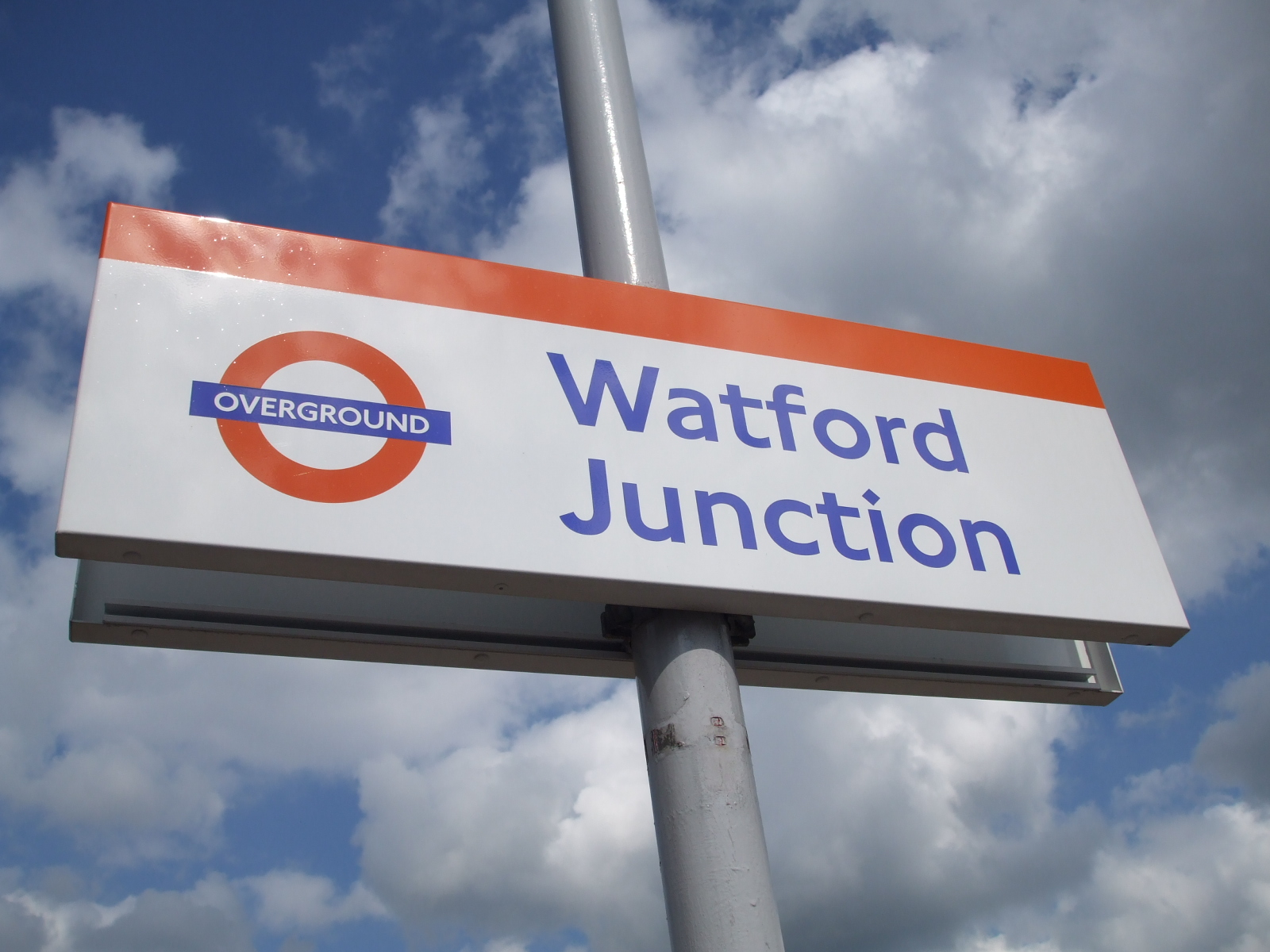
Watford Junction, the northern terminus of London Overground

Watford is served by five railway stations and a London Underground station. Watford Junction is on the West Coast Main Line with trains from London Euston to the Midlands, the North West and Scotland. Journey time to London Euston is typically 16 minutes non-stop. The station is mainly served by frequent suburban and regional trains operated by London Northwestern, which run to Tring and Milton Keynes and the cross-London Southern service to Clapham Junction via Shepherd's Bush. Two all-stations services terminate at Watford Junction: the suburban service operated by London Overground, which runs to Euston; and the Abbey Line shuttle service to St Albans Abbey.

The London Overground service from Watford Junction runs south via a suburban loop and stops at Watford High Street, before continuing via Bushey to London Euston.

Watford tube station is the terminus of the Watford branch of London Underground's Metropolitan line. The station is located outside the centre of Watford, close to Cassiobury Park.

Direct train services run from Watford Junction to Birmingham International station, for Birmingham Airport.

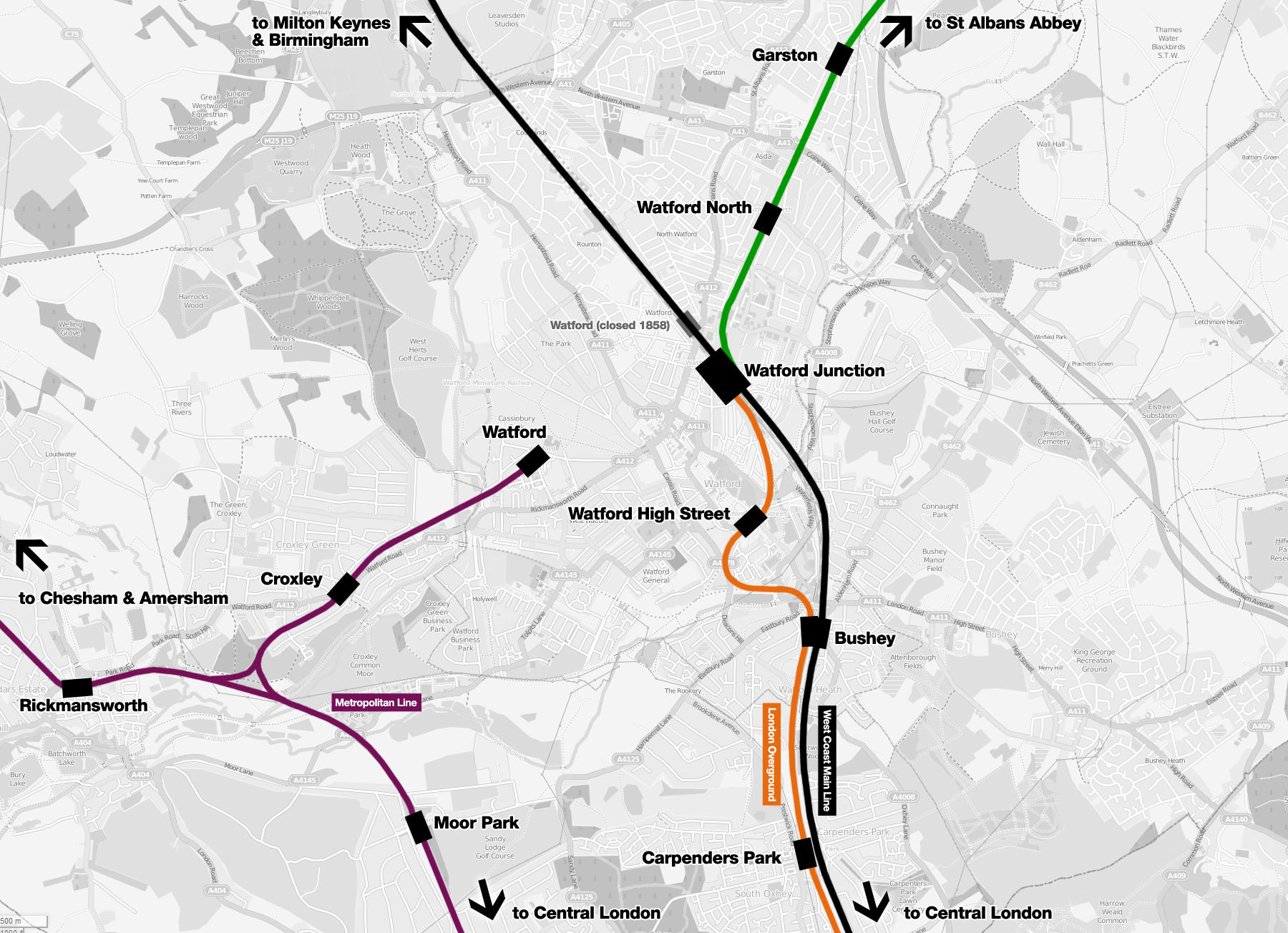
Map of railways around Watford (2013)

Stations in Central Watford
Pic	Station	Services	Notes
	Watford Junction	National Rail London Overground	West Coast Main Line local and regional services Abbey Line; Cross-London service to Clapham Junction; Watford DC Line
	Watford High Street	London Overground	Watford DC Line
	Watford North	National Rail	Abbey Line
	Garston	National Rail	Abbey Line
	Watford tube station	London Underground	Metropolitan line

==== Abandoned railway schemes ====
In 2008, a proposal was made that Regional Eurostar services could run via Watford to Paris via Kensington Olympia. In 1999, the Select Committee on Environment, Transport and the Regions took the view that Watford was "well placed to become an integrated transport hub" and it recommended that "services from Watford to Paris should commence as soon as possible." The Regional Eurostar scheme eventually came to nothing and was put on hold indefinitely.

A scheme to introduce light rail to Watford was conceived in 2009, when it was proposed that the Abbey Line should be converted to tram-train operation and run by Hertfordshire County Council. The project was cancelled due to the complications and expense of transferring the line from National Rail to the county council.

In 2013, the Croxley Rail Link project was approved to extend the London Underground Metropolitan line to Watford Junction by reinstating a stretch of the former Watford and Rickmansworth Railway. As part of the scheme, Watford Metropolitan station would have closed to passengers and been replaced by new stations on the reopened route at Cassiobridge and Watford Vicarage Road. The project did not go ahead due to funding problems.

In August 2014, the transport secretary Patrick McLoughlin indicated that the government was actively evaluating the extension of Crossrail as far as Tring, with potential Crossrail stops at Wembley Central, Harrow & Wealdstone, Bushey, Watford Junction, Kings Langley, Apsley, Hemel Hempstead and Berkhamsted. This proposal was subsequently shelved in August 2016 due to "poor overall value for money to the taxpayer".

=== Future plans ===
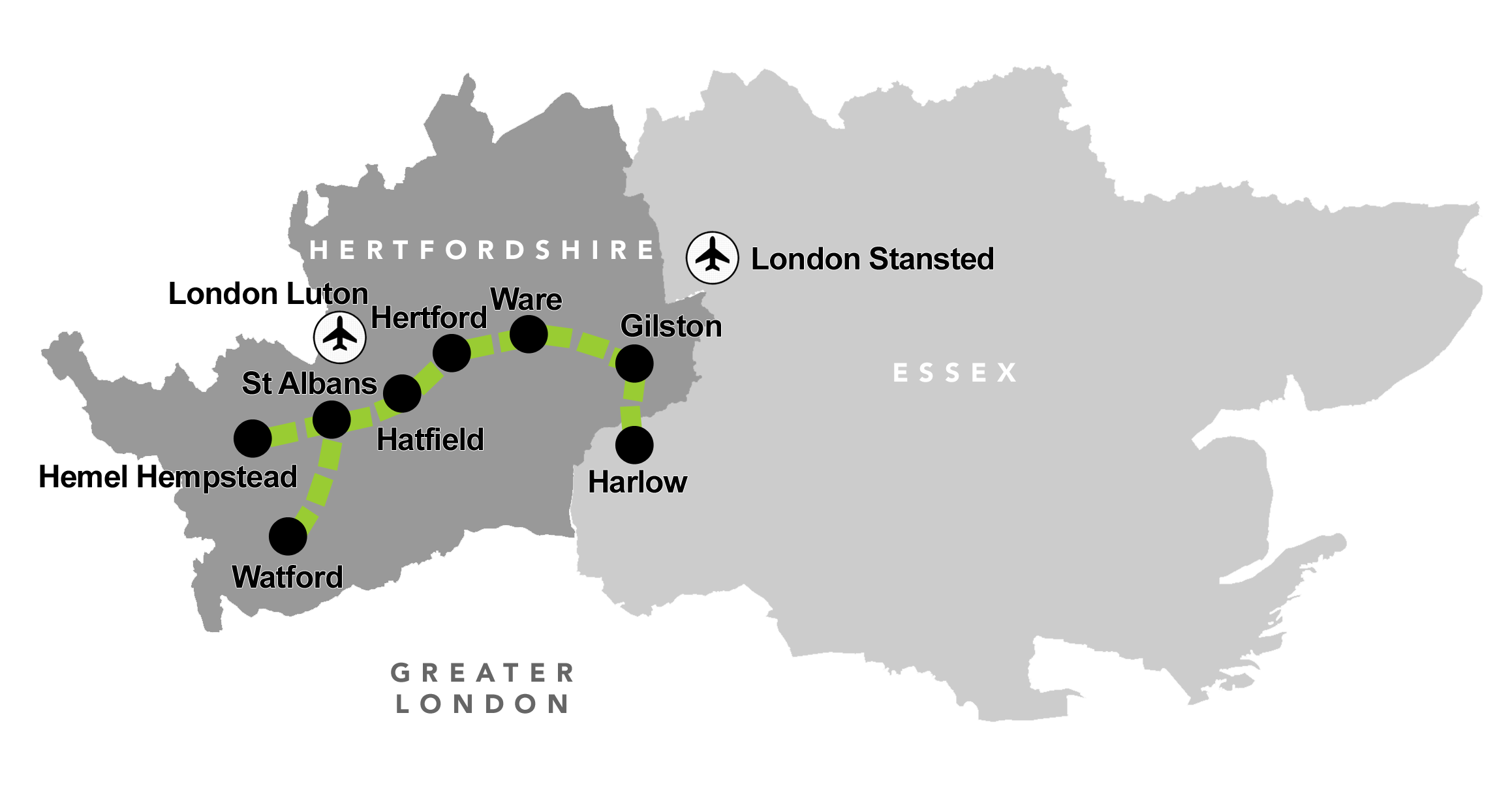
Outline of the proposed HERT rapid transit routes, as yet unconfirmed

Hertfordshire County Council is considering proposals to develop an east–west transit system, Hertfordshire Essex Rapid Transit (HERT) across the central belt of Hertfordshire, which could run from Watford to Harlow in Essex via St Albans. The project is not confirmed and remains unfunded, but it is possible that the scheme will incorporate the Abbey Line and part of the abandoned Croxley Rail link route. HERT vehicles have not been specified, but proposals indicate that zero-emission passenger vehicles are being considered, including trams, guided busways, or trackless trams.

=== Air ===
Elstree Airfield is 3 miles (5 km) east of Watford. Several private charter companies and flying clubs are based there. Watford is the base for 2F (Watford) Squadron, Air Training Corps.

=== Waterways ===
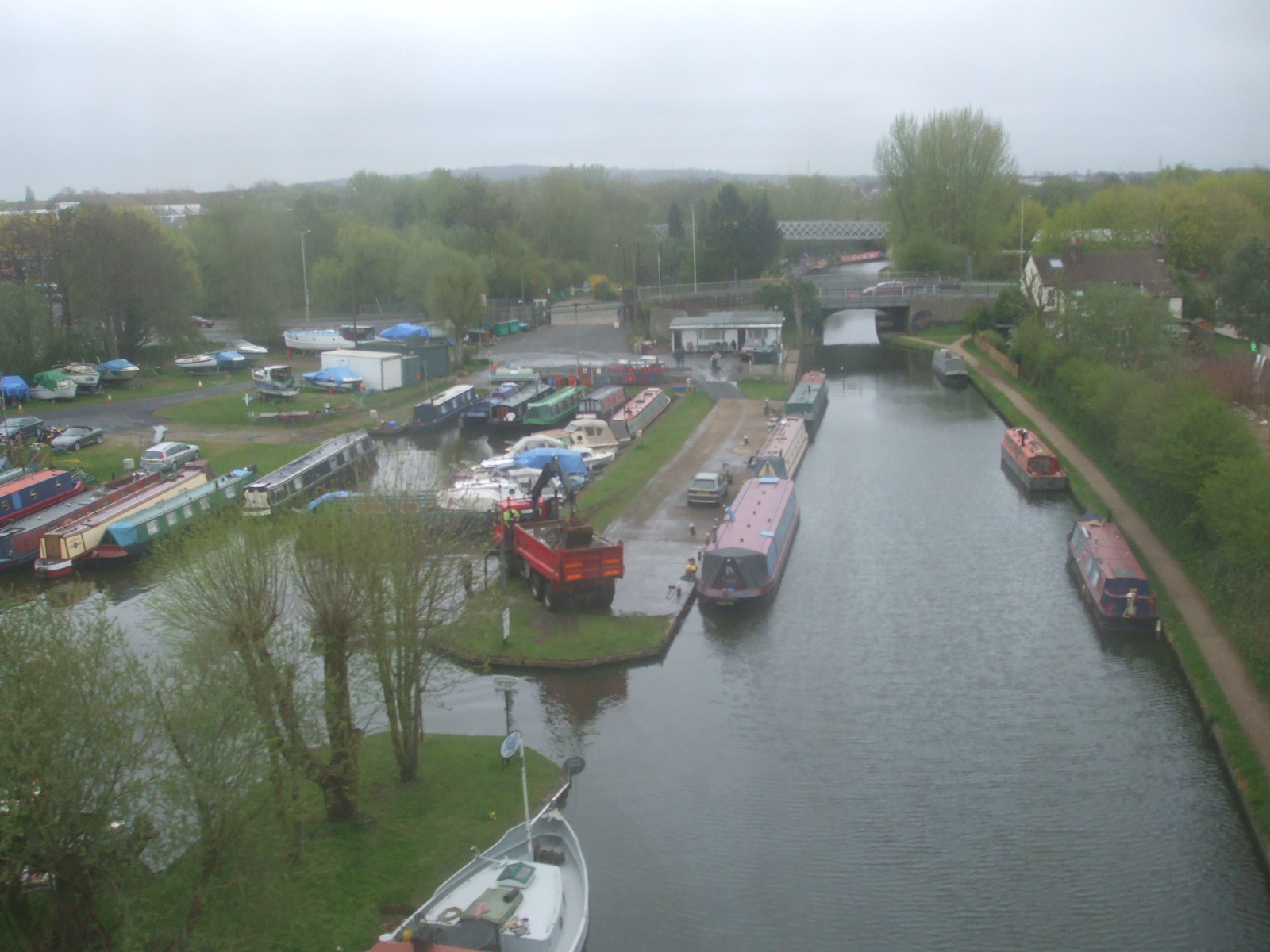
The Grand Union Canal, seen from the Metropolitan line

Watford is on the main Grand Union Canal route northwards from London. It now sees little commercial use, since the advent of the motorways, but the canal is used for recreational purposes. The River Gade and the River Colne flow through Watford.

=== Cycling ===
Watford town centre and the surrounding area is relatively compact and the terrain is generally quite flat. Over 9 miles (14 km) of new cycle routes have been developed in the town since 2003 and a range of cycle maps are available locally. In Watford, cycling to work makes up 2.2% of all journeys compared with 1.6% across the whole of Hertfordshire.

National Cycle Routes 6 and 61 run across the eastern and southern sides of the town, using the off-road Ebury Way and Abbey Way. There is a continuous cycle route through the north–south axis of the town centre, including the pedestrianised parts along The Parade and High Street. Cycle parking is provided at intermittent points in the town centre and at local centres in the wider town.

=== North of Watford expression ===
There is an expression, North of Watford, meaning locations north of Greater London. Alternatively, North of Watford Junction was used with similar meaning referring to Watford Junction railway station's position as the last urban stop on the main railway line out of Euston. The phrase's original use pre-dates the M1 motorway's Watford Gap services, but current use may refer to either Watford or the Watford Gap services.

== Education ==
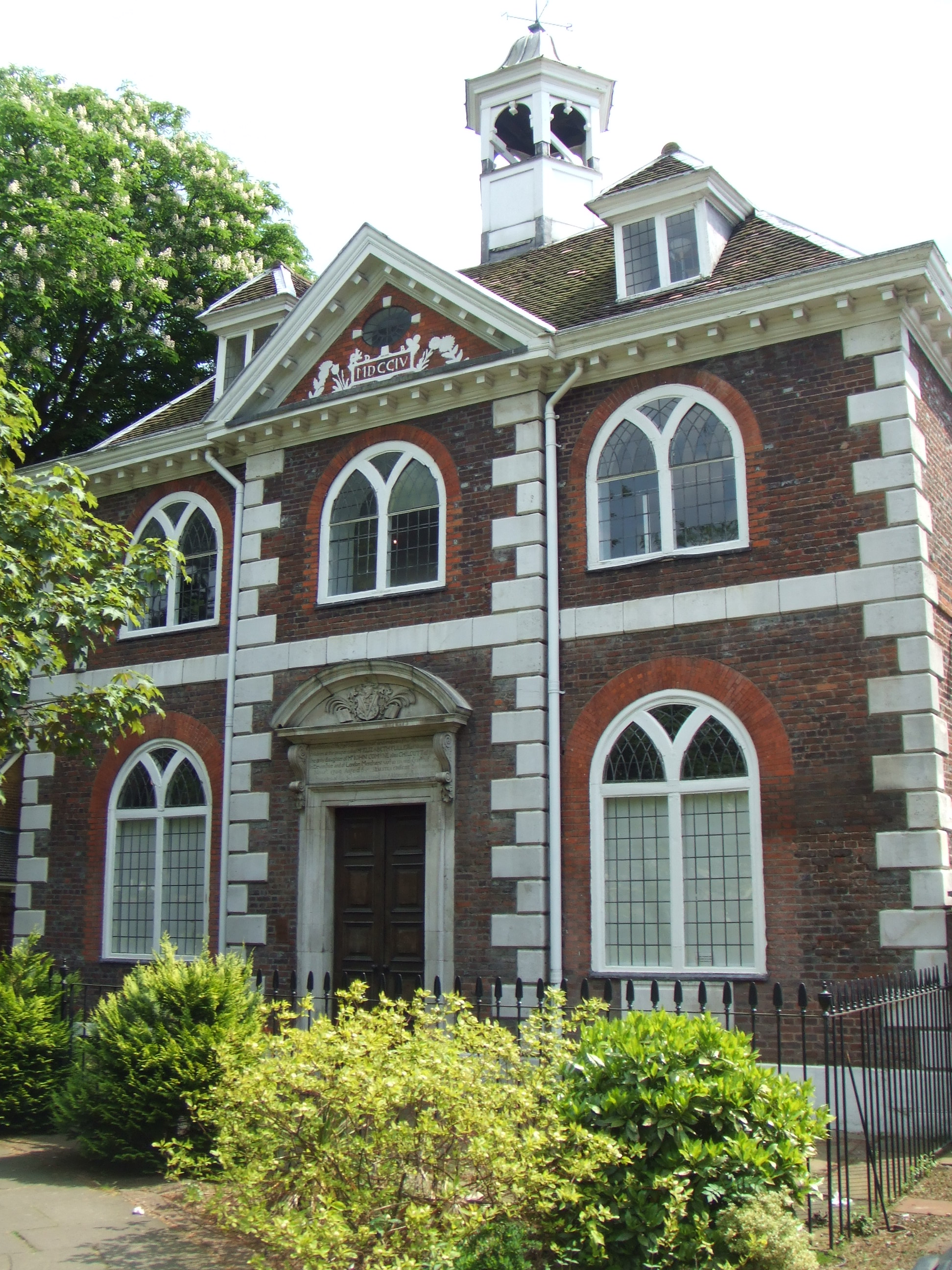
Watford Free School, built 1705, closed 1882

The earliest records of schooling in Watford are of a schoolmaster named George Redhead in 1595, and of a Free School receiving an annual donation of £10 in 1640. The school consisted of "a room over two houses belonging to the Church Estate, nearest the churchyard." In 1704, Elizabeth Fuller of Watford Place built a new Free School for forty boys and twenty girls on her land next to the churchyard, with rooms for a master and a mistress. In the mid-19th century, the recorded schools in Watford were Fuller's Free School, by now in a poor state, and the separate boys and girls national schools of St Mary's in Church Street. All offered elementary education.

The Free School closed in 1882, and its endowment contributed to founding the Watford Endowed Schools, which provided secondary education and charged fees. After these schools, now called the Watford Grammar School for Boys and the Watford Grammar School for Girls, moved to new sites in 1907 and 1912, the building housed the Watford Central school, which taught pupils up to the age of 14. St Mary's National Schools closed in 1922, and the site is now a car park. The London Orphan Asylum, later Reed's School, was located near Watford Junction station between 1871 and 1940.

The only independent secondary school in the borough is Stanborough School, a day and boarding school operated by the Seventh-day Adventist Church. There are several independent schools nearby, including Purcell School, a specialist music school.

All the state-funded primary schools in Watford are co-educational. Under an earlier system, schools were divided into infant schools, covering Reception and Years 1 and 2, and junior schools, covering Years 3 to 6. Most such schools have amalgamated to form Junior Mixed Infant schools or (equivalently) primary schools, and all new schools are of this type.

Although all state-funded secondary schools in Hertfordshire are comprehensive, there is a great deal of differentiation in the southwestern corner of the county, centred on Watford but also including most of the Three Rivers district and Bushey in Hertsmere district. Within this area, there are:

- partially selective schools, which offer a proportion of places according to ability or aptitude, and the rest to siblings or those living near the school: Parmiter's School, Queens' School, Rickmansworth School, St Clement Danes School, Watford Grammar School for Boys and Watford Grammar School for Girls.
- Bushey Meads School, which selects 10% for technological aptitude and uses banded admissions to ensure a comprehensive intake for the remainder.
- non-selective Roman Catholic schools, whose intake is evenly spread: St Joan of Arc Catholic School and St Michael's Catholic High School.
- other non-selective schools, whose intake is markedly affected by the above partially selective schools: Future Academies Watford, The Grange Academy and Westfield Academy.
- Falconer School, a school for boys with emotional and behavioural difficulties.
- University Technical College: The Watford UTC was a school for 14–19 year olds that operated between 2014 and 2023.

The partially selective schools and Bushey Meads School operate common admissions tests in mathematics and non-verbal reasoning each autumn. In addition to those seeking selective places, all applicants to Bushey Meads and Queens' School are required to take the tests, so they are taken by the majority of Year 6 children in the area. The partially selective schools also operate a common test and audition procedure to select children for specialist music places.

Results achieved by the schools at GCSE are also widely spread, including the three highest and the two lowest scoring state schools within Hertfordshire. The area also has by far the highest incidence in the county of children allocated to schools to which they had not applied.

The Watford Campus of West Herts College is the only grade 1 further education college in the United Kingdom according to a 2011 Ofsted report. The Centre for Missional Leadership (CML) is the Watford branch of the London School of Theology, Europe's largest evangelical theological college.

== Media ==
=== Television ===
Watford is within the BBC London and ITV London region. Television signals are received from the Crystal Palace TV transmitter and the local relay transmitter situated in Hemel Hempstead.

=== Radio ===
Local radio stations are BBC Three Counties Radio on 92.1 FM, Heart Hertfordshire has its studios in The Metro Centre in the town which broadcast on 96.6 FM and community based stations: Vibe 107.6 on 107.6 FM and Watford Hospital Radio known as The Pulse Hospital Radio broadcasts to patients from the Watford General Hospital.

=== Newspapers ===
The Watford Observer is the town's local weekly newspaper.

== Sport ==
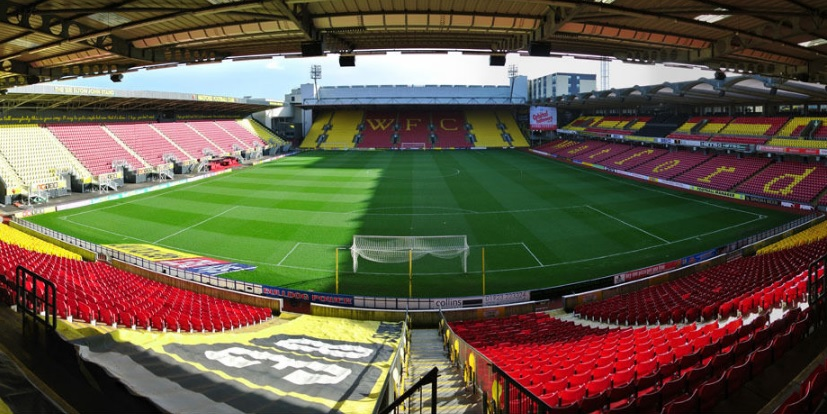
Vicarage Road, home of Watford FC in 2015

The professional football team Watford F.C. competes in the EFL Championship in the 2025–2026 season. Watford reached the 1984 and 2019 FA Cup Finals, also finishing as league Division One (now the Premier League) runners-up in 1983. They were relegated from Division One in 1988. In 1996, Watford was relegated from the new Division One (now the Football League Championship). Watford won the then Nationwide Division Two championship in 1998, then the following season (1998–99) reached the Premier League. The club was relegated the next season. After five years, Watford won the Football League Championship play-off final achieving promotion to the Premier League in 2006, this time beating Leeds United FC by three goals to nil.

The club was relegated to the Football League Championship after a single season (2006–2007) in the Premier League. It was promoted to the Premier League in 2015, after finishing second in the Championship. The singer-songwriter, Sir Elton John, is a keen, long-term supporter of Watford FC and a former club chairman. He still maintains his links with Watford as Honorary Life President. Between 1997 and 2013, the club shared its ground, Vicarage Road, with Saracens Rugby Football Club.

Other sports teams include a non-League football team, Sun Sports FC, which plays at The Sun Postal Sports & Social Club, the Watford Cheetahs, an American football team which played home games at Fullerians RFC between 2008 and 2012, Glen Rovers, who play both hurling and Gaelic football, and Watford Town Cricket Club.

== Freedom of the Borough ==
The following people and military units have received the Freedom of the Borough of Watford.

=== Individuals ===
- George Villiers, 6th Earl of Clarendon: 28 July 1924.
- Dennis Herbert, 1st Baron Hemingford: 22 March 1943.
- Sir Elton John: 6 October 1977.
- Sir Raphael Tuck: 15 November 1980.
- Graham Taylor: 25 June 2001.
- Luther Blissett: 18 October 2021.
- Norman Tyrwhitt: 23 July 2005.
- Mavis Tyrwhitt: 23 July 2005.

=== Military Units ===
- 1st East Anglian Regiment: 1959.
- Royal Anglian Regiment: 1964.
