= The Grove, Watford =

The Grove
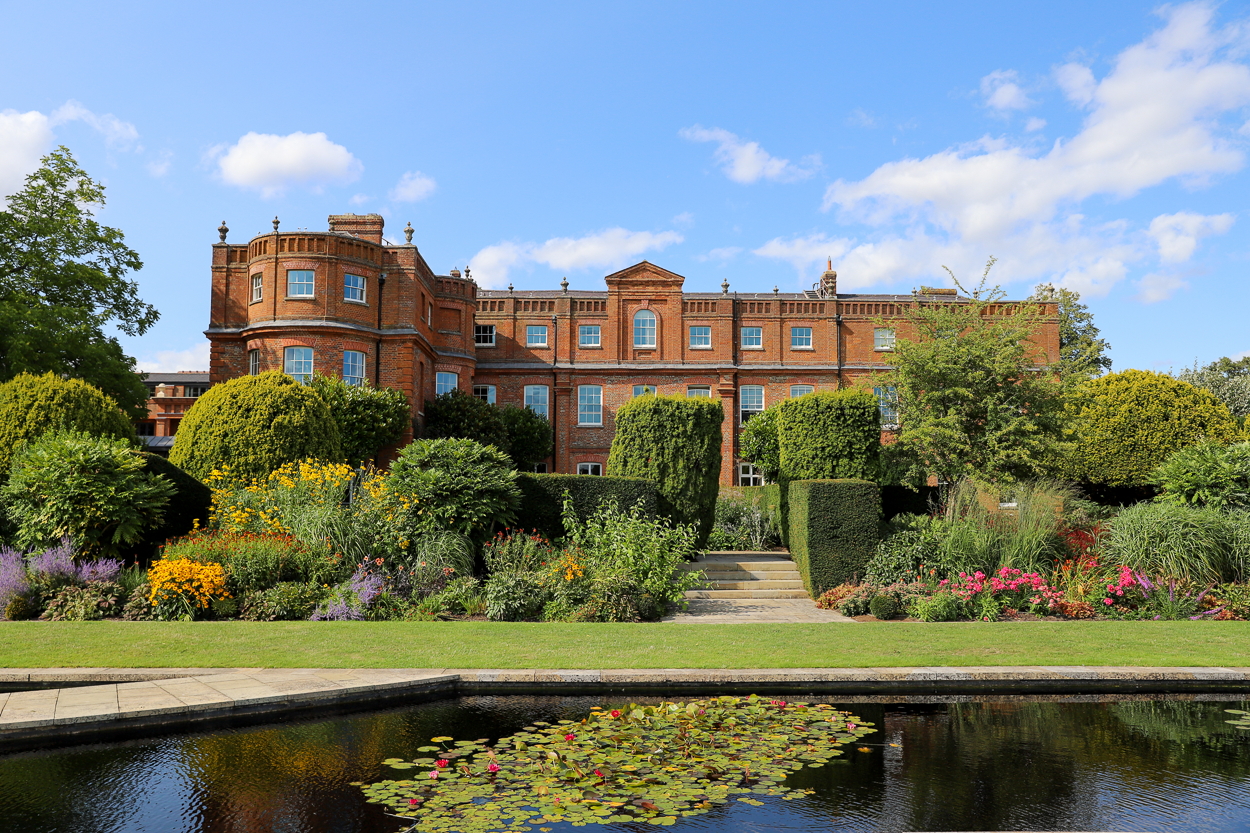
- The Grove, Watford, Hertfordshire

- Location within Hertfordshire
- Former names: La Grava

General information
- Status: Hotel
- Type: English country house
- Architectural style: Palladian
- Location: Chandler's Cross, Hertfordshire, Langleybury Lane, Chandler's Cross, Hertfordshire, WD3 4TG, Watford, United Kingdom
- Coordinates: 51.6774°N 0.4364°W
- Construction started: c.1720
- Renovated: c.1780, c.1870–5, 1996–2000
- Owner: Ralph Trustees Limited

Technical details
- Material: Red brick

Design and construction
- Architect: Sir Robert Taylor
- Designations: Grade II* listed building

Renovating team
- Architects: Matthew Brettingham, Edward Blore

Website
- www.thegrove.co.uk

The Grove is a large resort hotel in Hertfordshire, England, with a 300–acre (1.2 km^{2}) private park next to the River Gade and the Grand Union Canal. It touches on its north-west corner the M25 motorway and remains a small part in Watford. The estate is situated within three different settlements; most of the land and all of the mansion itself are in the civil parish of Sarratt, and also in the ecclesiastical parish of Langleybury, while the estate lies within the post town of Rickmansworth.

Originally built as an English country house on the site of a medieval manor house, The Grove served as the family seat of the Earls of Clarendon (second creation), the Villiers family, from 1776–c.1920. Since its Georgian construction, The Grove has been altered and extended four times by a number of noted architects, including Surveyor of the King's Works, Robert Taylor.

Following the increase in estate duty in 1914, the Villiers Family sold off the house and estate. Today it operates as a hotel with 214 guest rooms, a luxury spa, 16 meeting & event spaces and an 18-hole championship golf course.

== Local geography ==
The majority of the estate, including the mansion is in the post town of Rickmansworth, having postal prefix WD3. However, the east including the former mill is in Watford's first subdivision of post town (WD17). Watford was the estate's parish in all forms of local geography from 1086 until 1878.

A similar minority is in the ecclesiastical parish of Watford (St Luke), although most of the land and all of the mansion has been in Langleybury ecclesiastically since 1878, when that parish was founded. Secularly the mansion is in Sarratt civil parish.

The hotel's publicity material makes reference to Chandlers Cross, the nearest settlement, formerly part of another parish and which has a nucleus to the west. It has now become the smaller of two settlements in the neighbouring ecclesiastical parish of Chipperfield but is in the same parish in terms of local government.

== History ==
=== Archaeology ===
Excavations on the estate in 2002 revealed evidence from all periods of human cultural development. The earliest evidence of human activity is a Neolithic polished stone axe that was discovered in a small pit with the remains of a pot that appears to be of Middle Bronze Age. The first evidence of settlement consists of traces of oval and circular dwelling structures from the Early Bronze Age (around 4,000 years old). The Iron Age gives some pottery evidence but none of settlement. Two burials have been found dating to the Roman period, although they seem to be in the native rather than Roman tradition. Traces of Saxon settlement, rare in Hertfordshire, have been found. There are remains of at least eight grubenhause, sunken-floored buildings that are typical of this period. Medieval pottery contemporary with the building of the first manor house have been found in ditches.

=== First references to The Grove ===
In 1294–5 John de Brittewell and Sarah his wife conveyed land and a third part of a mill written as 'La Grava' to Albreda de Brittewell and her two sisters Alice and Ellen. In 1324–5 Thomas de Harpesfield and Joan his wife held land in the demesne of St Albans at La Grava in the vill of Cassio, and the abbot released them from rent due for it. There is a monumental inscription in Watford church to John Heydon of the Grove, who died in 1400. John Rayner and Joan his wife conveyed the manor in 1481–1482 to John Fortescue, John Sturgeon, John Forster, and Henry Heydon, for the use of John Fortescue. Upon its administration in the Court of Chancery the estate passed to John Melksham or Melsam, who died in 1487, leaving John his son and heir, who, in 1503 with his wife Elizabeth, granted it to Reginald Pegge reserving a rent of £10. It passed to his son William, who, with Margaret his wife and the late wife of Pegge snr. (and her new husband Geoffrey Oxley), conveyed the manor in 1518 to William (d.1545) and John Heydon. William's son was Henry (d. 1559) who inherited and left the Grove to his son Francis, who sold the manor in 1602 to Clement Scudamore.

He sold it in 1631 and two water-mills under one roof, called the Grove Mills, to Sir William Ashton who left it to his second son Robert. His son died without issue in 1703 so it passed to Sir William Buck who died in 1717, great-grandson of Sir William Ashton. It passed to son Charles Buck, who had it totally rebuilt (see below) and in 1728 sold it to the trustees of Fulke Greville, born 1717. He in 1743 sold it to Arthur M. St Leger, 3rd Viscount Doneraile, who conveyed it in 1748 in legal title not equity to Charles Unwin (as his trustee) — so on death in 1750 without issue, Doneraile's will confirmed his wish it pass to cousin Elizabeth St Leger 'until marriage' — she then married Major Ralph Burton.

On her marriage the estate re-vested in trustees, who sold it in 1753 to the Hon. Thomas Villiers, successful diplomat and second son of William Villiers, 2nd Earl of Jersey. Thomas Villiers married the heiress to the wealthiest branch of the Hyde family whose 1st Earl was a minister under Charles, Charles II and grandfather of Anne and Mary.

=== Seat for the new Earls of Clarendon ===
Earls of Clarendon

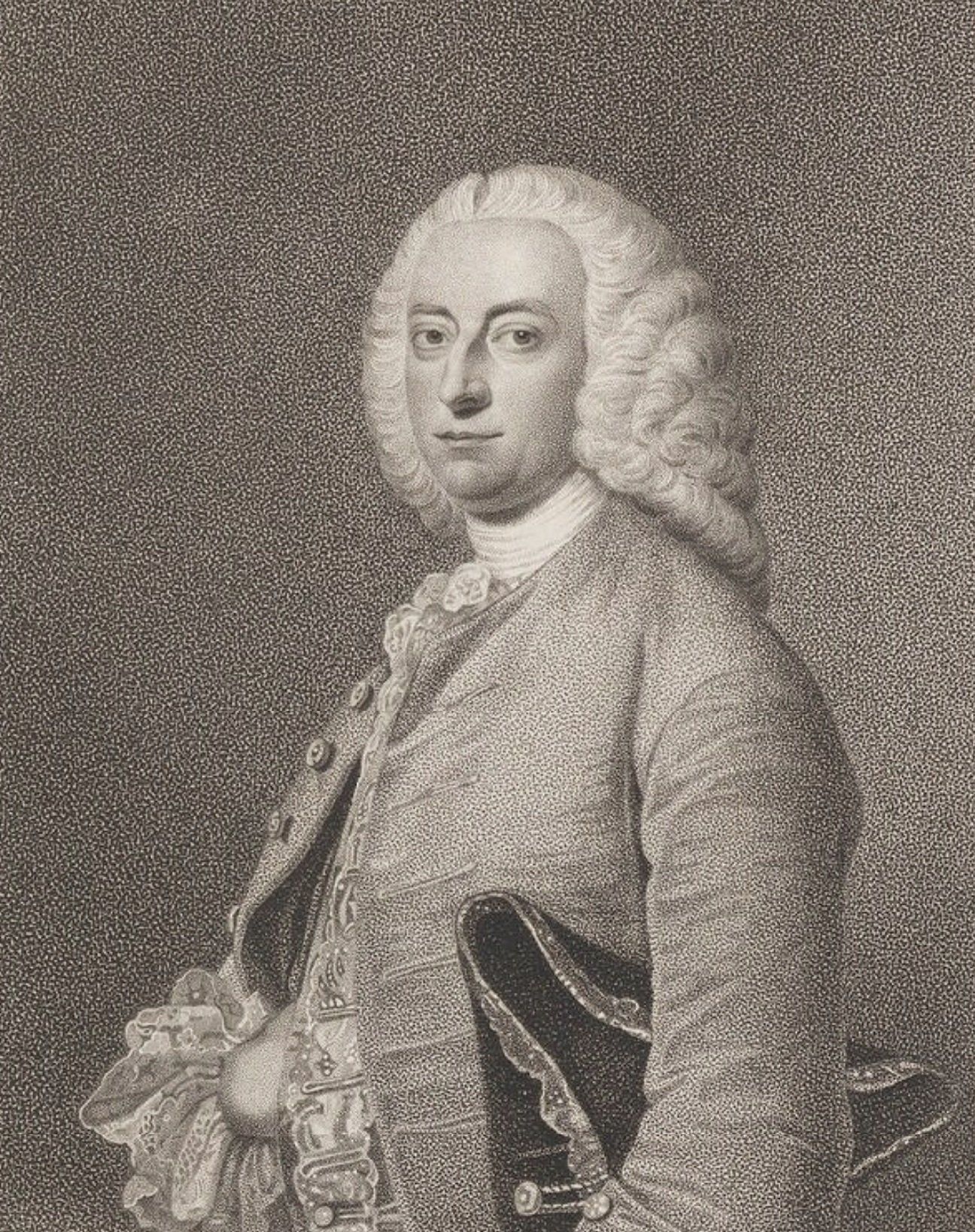
Thomas Villiers, 1st Earl of Clarendon (1709–1786)

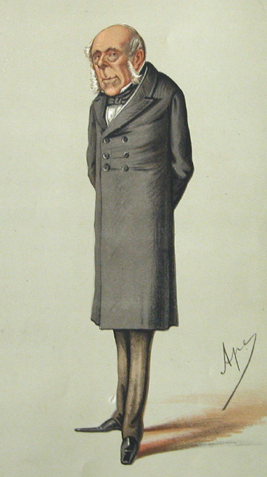
George Villiers, 4th Earl of Clarendon (1800–1870)

The Grove was the family seat of the Earls of Clarendon 1776–c.1920

Thomas was soon created Lord Hyde (Baron Hyde of Hindon) for his diplomatic services in 1756 and in 1776 the Crown revived the old Earldom and raised him to 1st Earl of Clarendon (second creation).

The fourth earl was a statesman, diplomat (architect of the Quadruple Alliance of 1834), Secretary of State for Foreign Affairs, Lord Privy Seal, Chancellor of the Duchy of Lancaster, President of the Board of Trade, Lord Lieutenant of Ireland and gained non-occupational titles KG and GCB. Consequently, regular guests in the mid and late nineteenth century included Queen Victoria, Prime Minister Lord Palmerston and Edward VII.

=== Since 1900 ===
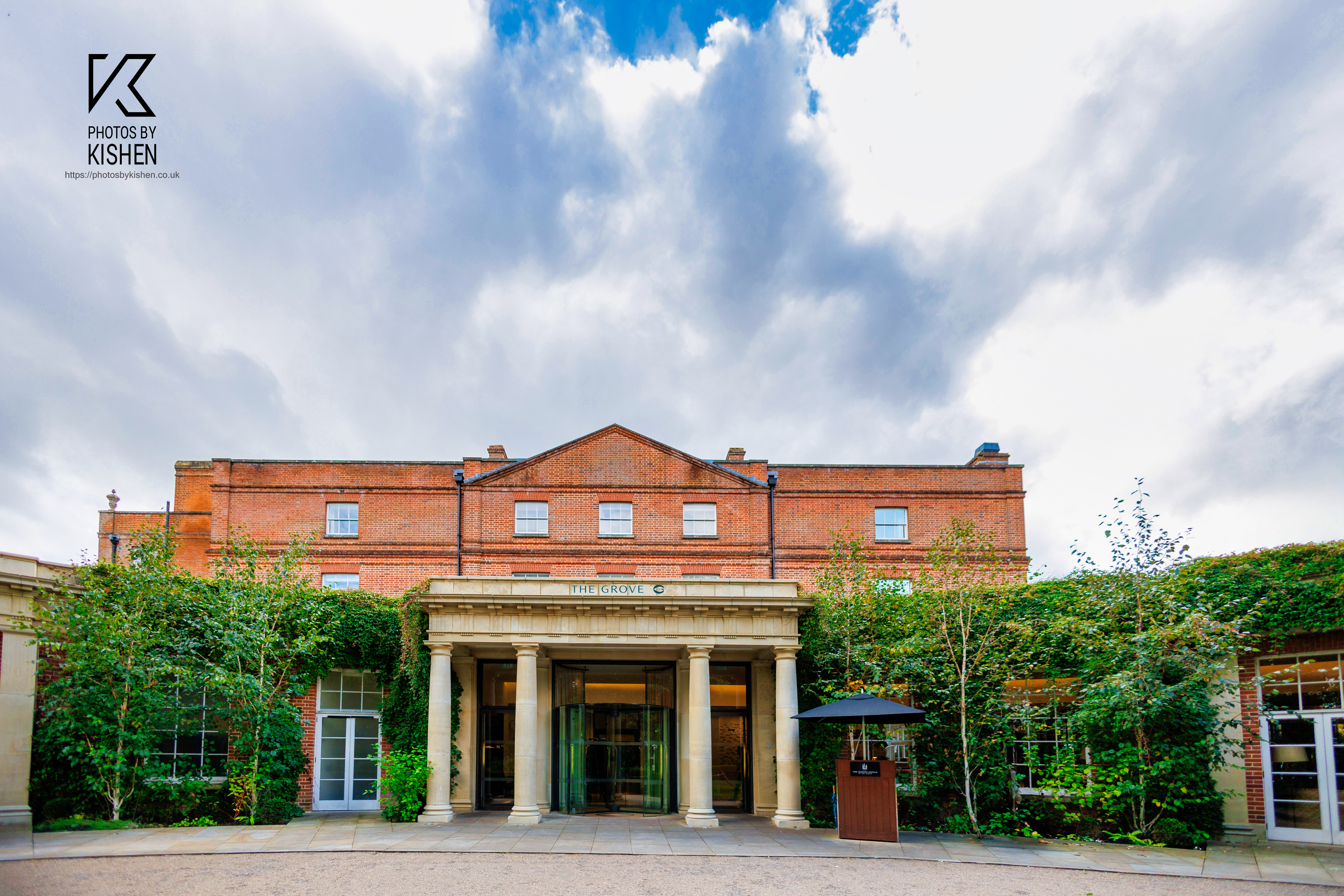
Since 1996, The Grove Hotel has been used as a luxury hotel.

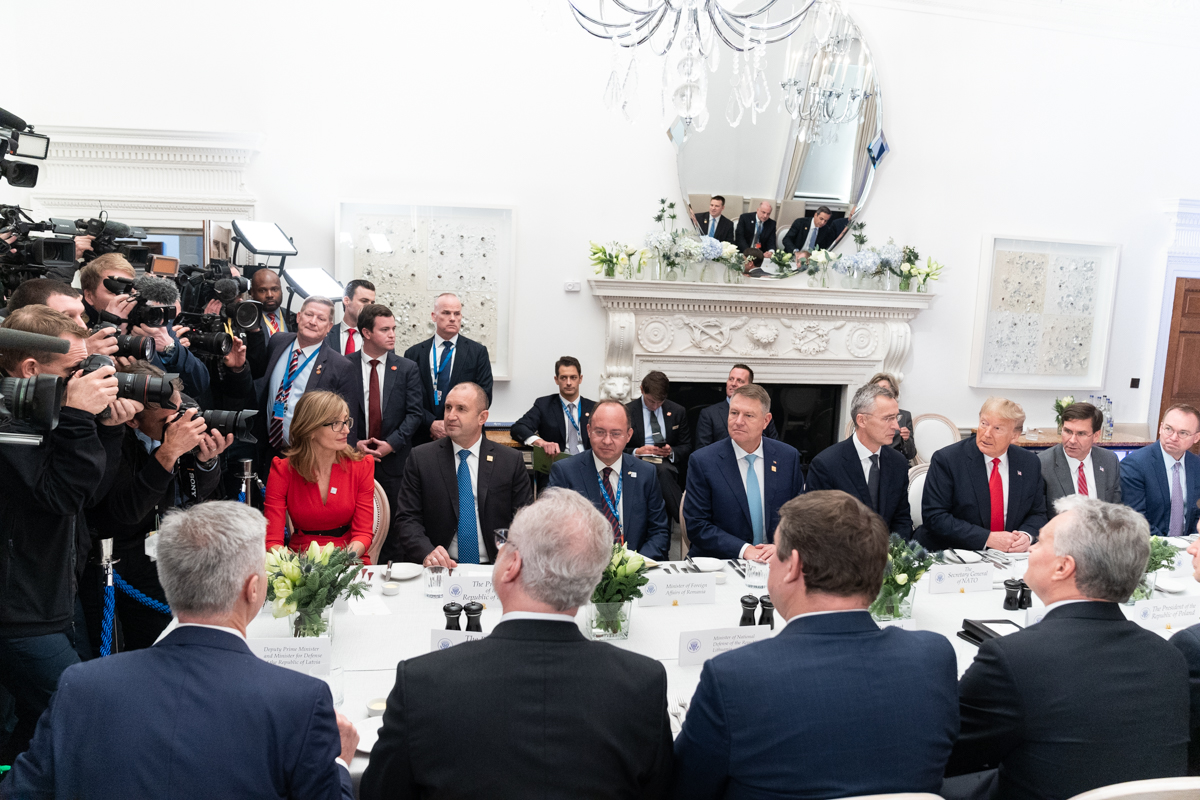
US President Donald Trump at a lunch during the 2019 NATO summit in the Mansion Room at The Grove

In the early 20th century, death duties, a form of taxation introduced in 1894 by the Liberal Government, was placing an increasing financial burden on landed gentry and was responsible for the breaking up of many large estates across Britain. In the 1920s, in order to reduce their tax liabilities, the Villiers family decided to sell The Grove, downsizing their holdings to their estate at Swanmore, Hampshire. Also at around this time, nearby Cassiobury House was sold off by the widow of George Capell, 7th Earl of Essex in 1922 due to prohibitive death duties.

After the sale, The Grove was then used as a gardening school, a health centre (National Institute of Nutrition and College of Dietetics), a riding school, and a girls' boarding school. It was the wartime headquarters of one of the Big Four consolidated railway companies. It became a management training centre for the British Transport Commission and later British Rail.

In 1996, the estate was acquired by Ralph Trustees Ltd, at which time the mansion was extended and converted into a hotel. Jeremy Blake, an architect with listed buildings and sustainability expertise, was appointed to undertake these works. The Grove is a former AA Hotel of the Year and was voted the UK's Favourite Leisure Hotel by Condé Nast Traveler readers in 2008.

The formal gardens were designed by the Chelsea Flower Show Gold Medallist and judge, Michael Balston. Other features include an 18-hole championship golf course designed by the Californian Kyle Phillips. The golf course is laid out to the south and east of the house (which is on a low hill above the valley of the river Gade) with its eastern border reaching to the western bank of the Grand Union Canal (that incorporates the Gade in this part of the valley) and its southern border adjacent to the golf course of the West Hert Golf Club.

In 2006, it was the venue of the WGC-American Express Championship golf tournament. It was the venue for the April 2009 G20 London summit.

The 2013 Bilderberg Conference took place in the hotel and in 2016 it hosted the British Masters golf tournament. It also hosted the 2019 NATO Leaders' Meeting, chaired by the NATO Secretary General, on 4 December 2019.

== Architecture ==
The main house is a red brick structure with stone quoins, mostly in the Palladian style. The south-facing front of the house is flanked by large neoclassical Doric pilasters.

The architecture developed as follows:

- The Grove was built about 1720 Charles Buck; its foundations and its internal structure dates to that year.
- Altered 1754-61 by architect Matthew Brettingham for the 1st Earl (see above and below).
  - He produced a seven-bay south front with two wings, facing south, between 1754 and 1761. Its south facing main entrance front features a "2:3:2, main range articulated by Giant Roman Doric pilasters...To [the] centre a larger round-headed sash with apron panel and key blocked surround in an aedicular frame with pediment rising above 20th century stone coped parapet. Cross axial stacks."
- Extended and altered c.1780 by architect Sir Robert Taylor for the 1st Earl.
  - Demolished the Brettingham wing with the family chapel and created a Palladian two-storey mansion with Venetian windows and, internally, Italian plasterwork. The eastern front was designed in response to the new Repton-inspired drive, winding through the Gade Valley over a bridge and between lakes, which have all been restored. He was also responsible for four fireplaces, one of which was destroyed to make way for a secretary's desk when the mansion was used as railway offices. A replica of the fireplace was created during the restoration of the mansion.
- Level added, altered and extended c.1870–5 by architect Edward Blore for the 4th Earl.
  - Under the 4th Earl of Clarendon (1800–1875), the family's political prominence meant that they entertained regularly. Third storey added to the house. Grander ground floor and main staircase created to make space to display the Earl's large collection of Old Masters.
- Altered and extended mid-20th century.
- Altered and extended 1996–2000.

== Facilities ==
The hotel's guest accommodation includes 214 rooms and suites located in the 18th-century mansion and the contemporary West Wing. Sequoia spa features a 22-metre (72 ft) swimming pool, sauna, steam room, and treatment rooms offering Bamford and Natura Bissé therapies. The 18-hole golf course, designed by Kyle Phillips, has hosted professional tournaments including the British Masters. Other facilities and activities include Anouska’s Kids Club, Jemima’s Kitchen Garden, the Walled Garden with a seasonal outdoor pool and beach area, and outdoor activities such as cycling, archery, and axe throwing. The Grove also has 16 flexible event spaces used for conferences, meetings, and private events.
