= Aslı Aydıntaşbaş =

Turkish journalist and author (born 1973)

- Born: 24 February 1973; İzmir, Turkey
- Education: Robert College; Bates College (BA); New York University (MA)
- Occupation: Journalist

Aslı Aydıntaşbaş (born 24 February 1973) is a Turkish journalist and political commentator based in Istanbul. She has written extensively on Turkish foreign policy, geopolitical trends, diplomacy, media freedom, and human rights. She speaks Turkish, English, and some French.

== Early life and education ==
Aslı Aydıntaşbaş was born in İzmir, the daughter of painter Figen Aydıntaşbaş and architect Halis Aydıntaşbaş. In 1993, she earned her B.A. from Bates College where she was the recipient of Maung Maung Gyi Award for Excellence in International Relations. In 2000, she successfully completed her M.A. degree in journalism and Middle East studies from New York University.

== Journalism career ==
She was a columnist for Turkish daily newspapers Milliyet (2008–15), Cumhuriyet (2016-18) and presenter on CNN Turk (2013–15).

She is a regular contributor to The Washington Post as a Global Opinions columnist. Her columns have also appeared in The Wall Street Journal, The New York Times, International Herald Tribune, Forbes, Politico, Newsweek and Foreign Affairs.

Aydıntaşbaş is a visiting fellow in the Center on the United States and Europe at Brookings Institution and a senior policy fellow at the European Council on Foreign Relations (ECFR).
