= Cowley railway station =

Former railway station in England

Coordinates: 51.5295°N 0.4763°W

Cowley
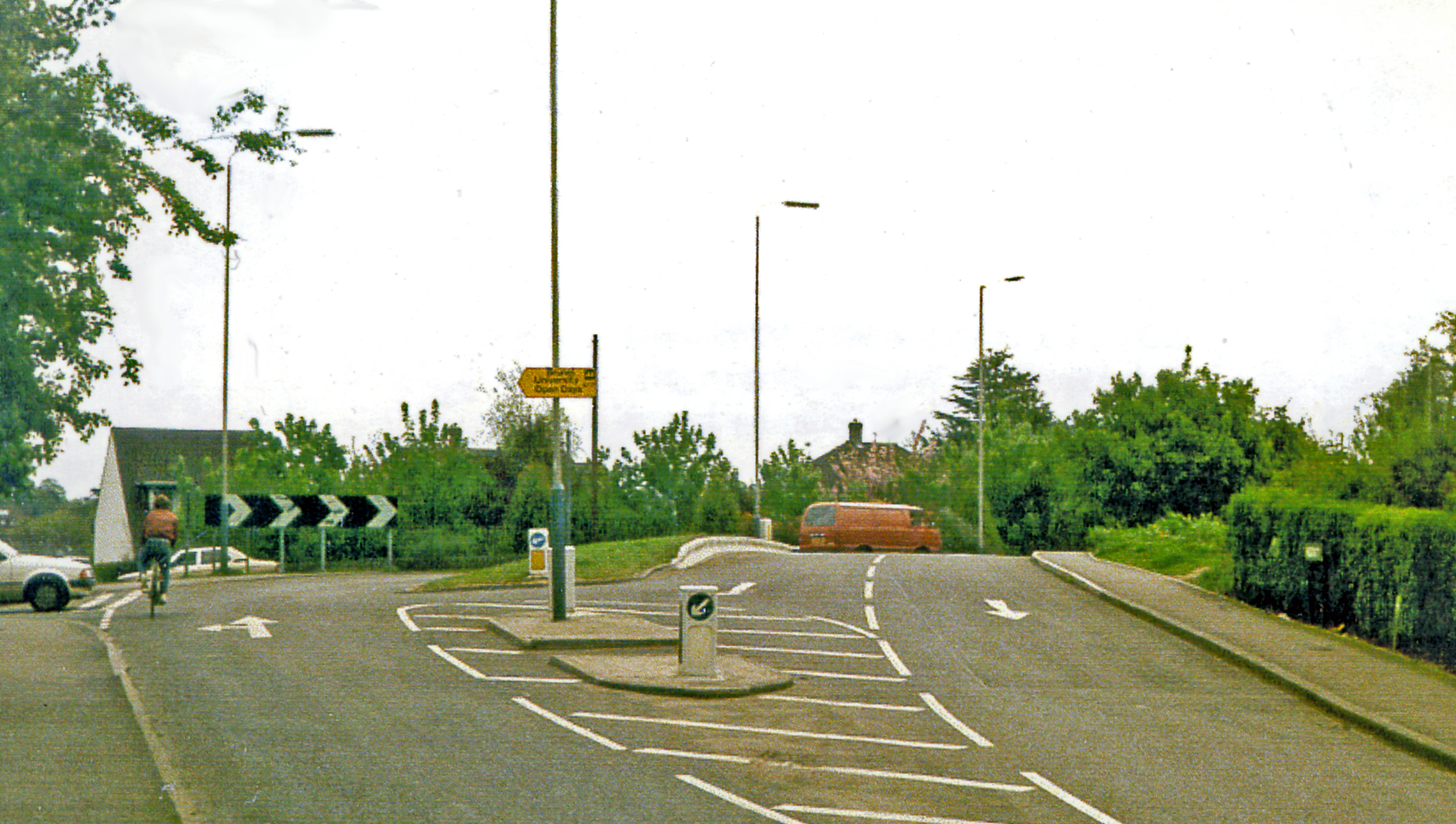
- Site of the station in 1986

General information
- Location: England
- Platforms: 2

Other information
- Status: Disused

History
- Original company: Great Western Railway
- Post-grouping: Great Western Railway

Key dates
- 1 October 1904: Opened
- 10 September 1962: Closed
Location

Cowley Railway Station was a station on the Uxbridge branch of the Great Western Railway in Cowley, London.

The station was opened to serve the small settlement of Cowley. It opened in 1904, nearly fifty years after the rest of the line from West Drayton had been constructed. It was the only intermediate station on the line, situated between Uxbridge Vine Street and West Drayton railway station. It closed to passengers on 10 September 1962, along with the remainder of the branch, but freight trains went through to Uxbridge Vine Street until 1964. Only the stretch of the line from West Drayton Station to the Grand Union Canal survived longer. This was for a freight service to the Middlesex Oil and Chemical Works in Yiewsley which stopped in 1979.

Cowley station has since been demolished and built over, and today there are only a few signs of its former existence, including a railway bridge and "Station Road". The station had two platforms, a station building on the southbound platform and a small shelter (also pre-1940, a ticket machine) on the other.

It was once part of early 20th century plans for a longer rail line from Denham to Staines via Uxbridge and West Drayton but the section linking Uxbridge High Street railway station and a point south of Uxbridge Vine Street was not built.

The site is now occupied by residential housing. Brunel University was built around what used to be the line heading north towards Uxbridge Vine Street runs through.

== See also ==
- List of closed railway stations in London
- Uxbridge High Street railway station

Preceding station	Disused railways	Following station
Uxbridge Vine Street; Line and station closed	Great Western Railway; Uxbridge branch	West Drayton; Line closed, station open
