= Watford and Rickmansworth Railway =

Railway line in Hertfordshire, England

Coordinates: 51°38′25″N 00°26′20″W

Watford & Rickmansworth Railway
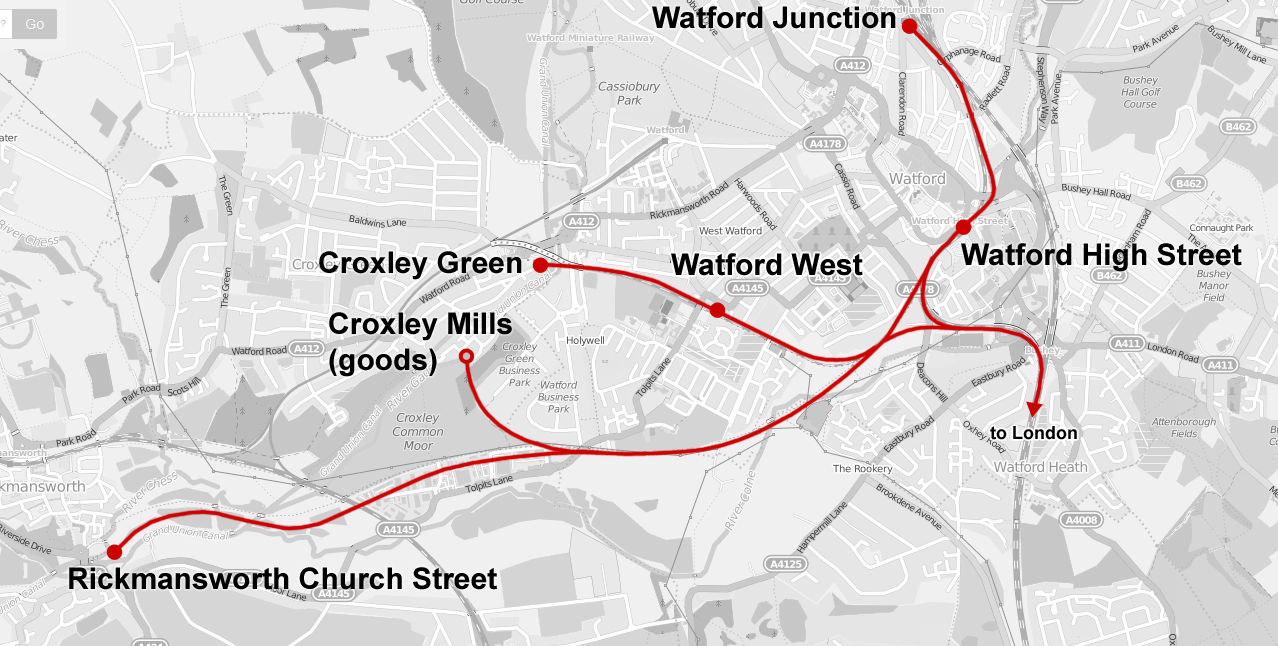
- Map of the Watford and Rickmansworth Railway

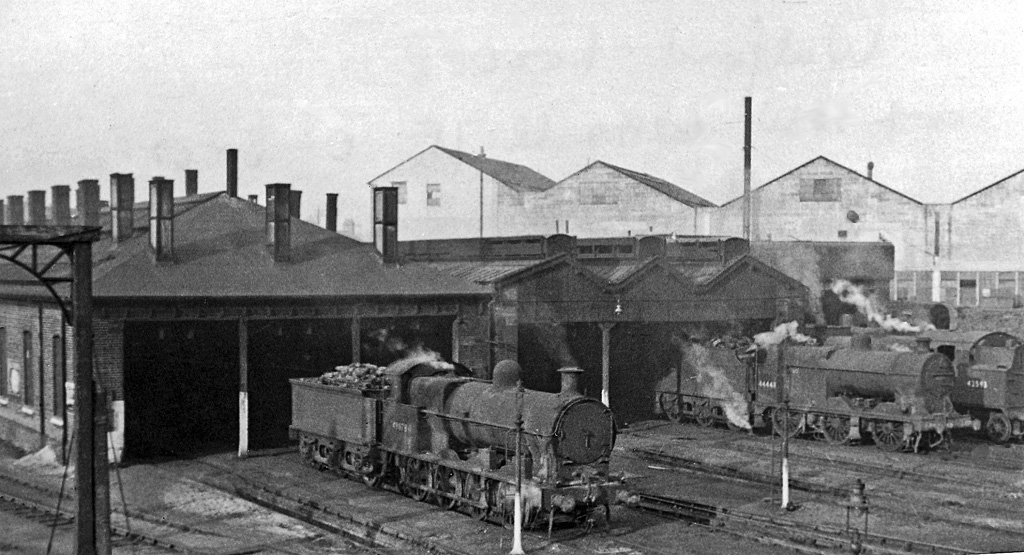
- LNWR steam locomotives in the depot at Watford Junction, the northern terminus

Overview
- Headquarters: Watford
- Locale: Three Rivers District & Watford; South-west Hertfordshire, UK
- Dates of operation: 1862–1881
- Successor: LNWR (1881-1922); LMS (1923-1948); British Rail (1948-1996)

Technical
- Track gauge: 1,435 mm (4 ft 8 1/2 in) standard gauge
- Electrification: 1917

The Watford and Rickmansworth Railway (W&RR) ran services between Watford and Rickmansworth in Hertfordshire, England. The company was incorporated in 1860; the line opened in 1862. The Rickmansworth branch was closed to passengers in 1952 and to freight in 1983. The Croxley Green branch closed in its entirety in 1996. The section between Watford Junction and Colne Junction remains in use as part of the London Overground.

== Lord Ebury's railway ==
Watford and Rickmansworth Railway Act 1860
- Act of Parliament
- Parliament of the United Kingdom
- Long title: An Act for making a Railway from the London and North-western Railway at Watford to Rickmansworth; and for other Purposes.
- Citation: 23 & 24 Vict. c. cxi

Dates
- Royal assent: 3 July 1860

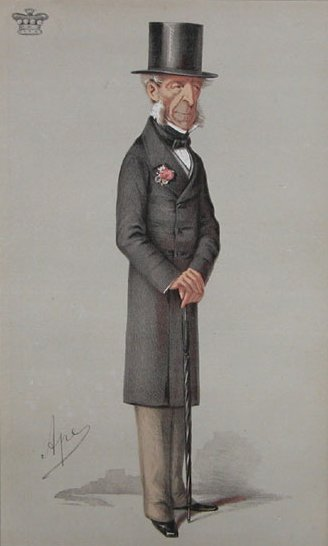
Robert Grosvenor, 1st Baron Ebury

The Watford and Rickmansworth Railway was a business venture of the Whig politician, Robert Grosvenor, 1st Baron Ebury (1801–1893), at a time of great competition among railway companies vying to construct new, lucrative passenger routes. In July 1860, Lord Ebury obtained powers in the Watford and Rickmansworth Railway Act 1860 (23 & 24 Vict. c. cxi) to construct a 4.5 mile single track line between Watford and Rickmansworth which opened in October 1862. It was nicknamed the "Ebury Line" after the railway company's founder and first chairman. The Rickmansworth terminus was located opposite the church to the south of the town where interchange sidings were provided with the nearby Grand Union Canal. The line had two other stations, Watford Junction and Watford High Street. The depot was situated on Wiggenhall Road in Watford.

Lord Ebury's vision was to construct a railway running 8 miles (13 km) southbound from Watford to Uxbridge Vine Street on the Great Western Railway's Uxbridge branch, eventually providing a new route from Watford to London Paddington via Uxbridge and West Drayton. The GWR offered to put up £20,000 towards the project and the Uxbridge and Rickmansworth Railway Act 1861 (24 & 25 Vict. c. lxxiii) was obtained to give authorisation to construct an extension from Rickmansworth to Uxbridge. The GWR later withdrew its offer of funding and the scheme foundered. Lord Ebury's ambition to link Watford and Uxbridge was never realised, and the W&RR was to remain a short branch line for its entire operation.

Watford and Rickmansworth Railway (Sale) Act 1863
- Act of Parliament
- Parliament of the United Kingdom
- Long title: An Act to grant further Powers to the Watford and Rickmansworth Railway Company.
- Citation: 26 & 27 Vict. c. cxxxi

Dates
- Royal assent: 13 July 1863

Text of statute as originally enacted

Despite hopes that the railway would bring further economic development to Rickmansworth and would serve the small factories and warehouses which had developed along the Grand Union Canal, it was Watford which actually grew at a faster pace and drew business from Rickmansworth. The construction of the railway was dogged with financial problems and a further act of Parliament, the Watford and Rickmansworth Railway (Sale) Act 1863 (26 & 27 Vict. c. cxxxi), had to be passed to authorise the issue of further shares to the value of £30,000 (£40,000 worth of shares had already been issued). The initial daily service consisted of five trains each way from Rickmansworth to Watford. The line was worked from the outset by the London and North Western Railway (LNWR), which shared Watford Junction station with the W&RR. For the first 19 years, the LNWR operated services and paid the W&RR 50% of the gross earnings of the line.

Attempts were made to remedy the W&RR's financial problems by opening several freight branches; a branch was driven along the edge of Croxley Common to serve Dickinson's paper mills and the Grand Union Canal at Croxley Green, and another short branch near Watford High Street served the warehouses of Benskins Brewery. The line ran close to the watercress beds of the River Gade and a steady trade developed in transporting hampers of watercress to Watford Market, resulting in the W&RR trains being nicknamed "Watercress Trains".

Watford and Rickmansworth Railway (Transfer and Dissolution) Act 1881
- Act of Parliament
- Parliament of the United Kingdom
- Long title: An Act to vest the undertaking of the Watford and Rickmansworth Railway Company in the London and North-western Railway Company; and for other purposes.
- Citation: 44 & 45 Vict. c. xcvi

Dates
- Royal assent: 27 June 1881

Text of statute as originally enacted

The Official Receiver was called in four years after opening. Despite all attempts to make Lord Ebury's railway into a commercial success, the company faced bankruptcy and by the Watford and Rickmansworth Railway (Transfer and Dissolution) Act 1881 (44 & 45 Vict. c. xcvi) it was absorbed by its operations partner, the burgeoning LNWR.

== Extension to Croxley Green ==
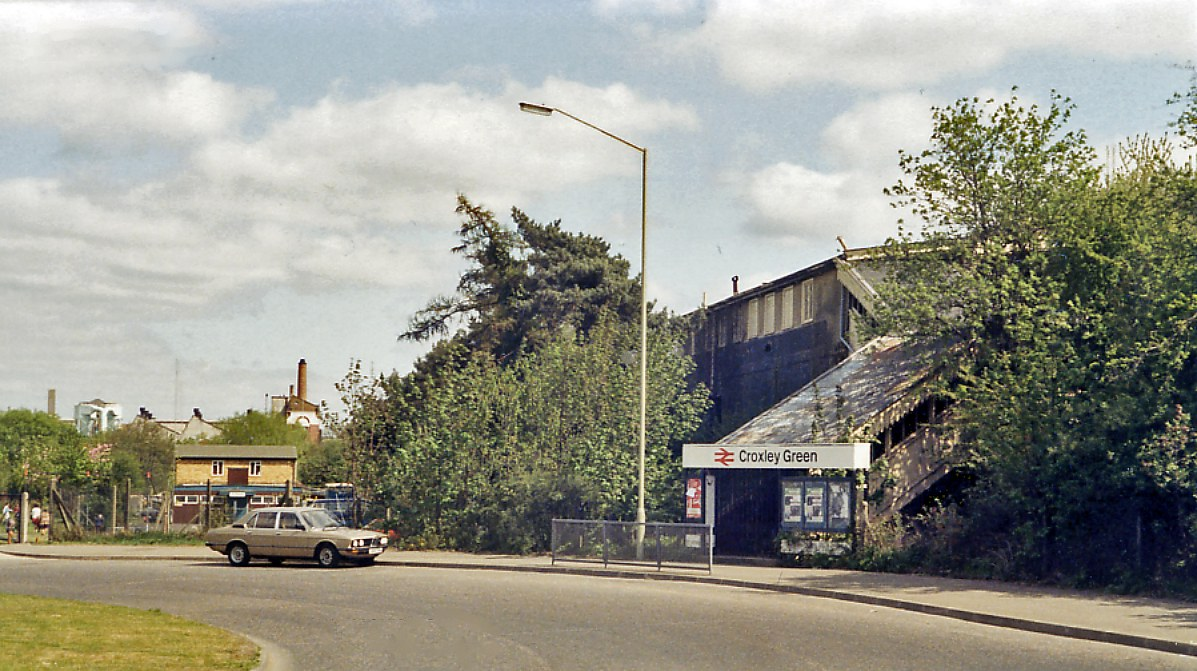
Croxley Green terminus, photographed in 1984

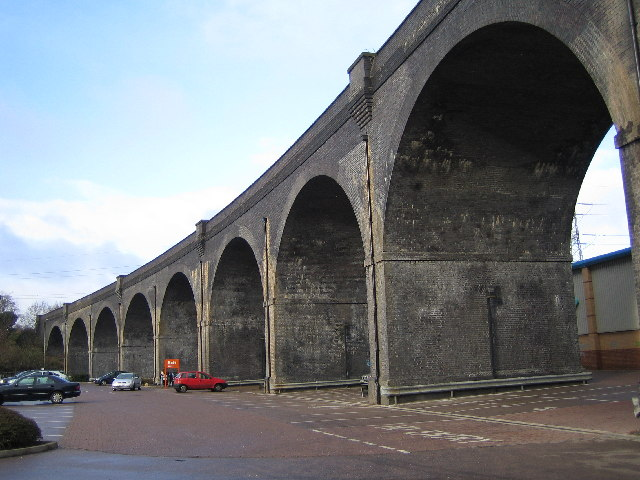
River Colne railway viaduct (the "Bushey Arches")

In the early 20th century, suburban railway competition was on the increase and the growing Metropolitan Railway was steadily expanding in north-west London. Although the Metropolitan did not reach the town of Watford until 1925, the LNWR was keen to act against emerging competition and in 1908 began work on a new branch line to Croxley Green. The extension involved the construction of a substantial bridge over the Grand Junction Canal. Passenger services on the new route commenced on 15 June 1912, with freight services starting on 1 October.

The following year, the LNWR built a new stretch of track from Watford High Street over the River Colne to Bushey & Oxhey railway station, with another connecting line turning south towards Rickmansworth. This new, triangular junction not only created a connection between the former W&RR lines and the LNWR's "New Line", but also enabled passenger services to run directly from Croxley Green to London Euston for the first time. The semi-rural location of the Croxley Green terminus gave added credence to the LNWR's slogan "Live in the Country".

In March 1913, Croxley Green station was burned down; it was suspected that the fire had been started deliberately by suffragettes.

== Electrification and pre-war years ==
Electric services were introduced over the Watford and Rickmansworth Railway on 16 April 1917 worked by tube trains of the London Electric Railway (LER) running through from Queen's Park to Watford on weekdays only until a daily service was introduced in July 1919; this was done to cope with the voltage drop caused by the branch being supplied only from the Watford end. These services were supplemented by LNWR trains from Broad Street during peak periods and steam trains from Euston. The Croxley Green branch was electrified on 30 October 1922, with Rickmansworth following in September 1927 as part of the LNWR's New Line Project.

With the vesting of the Watford and Rickmansworth Railway in the London, Midland and Scottish Railway (LMSR) in 1923, the nine joint LNWR/LER electric tube cars became known as "watercress trains" due to the volume of watercress gathered in the Chess Valley that the trains often carried in their luggage compartments. The stock was finally withdrawn in 1939 with the introduction of emergency war timetables and replaced with main line size electric stock.

== Rolling stock ==
Image	Stock type	Date
LNWR coal tank, pictured at Aylesbury High Street Station	LNWR 0-6-2 freight tank locomotive	1862
Oerlikon electric train	LNWR Oerlikon electric units	1922-1930; 1939-1957
Watford tube train running alongside LMS Steam train	LNWR/LER Joint Tube Stock	1930-1939
British Rail Class 501	British Rail Class 501	1957-1985
British Rail Class 313 at Watford Junction	British Rail Class 313	1986-1996
British Rail Class 104 at Buxton station	British Rail Class 104	1987/88

== Decline and closure ==
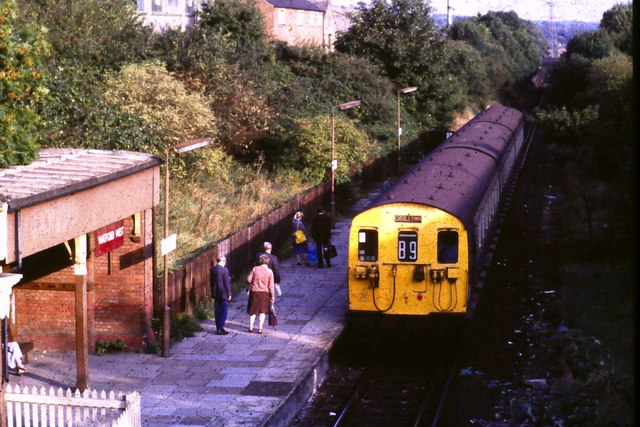
Watford West station, 1985: The Croxley Branch was kept in operation by British Rail until 1996

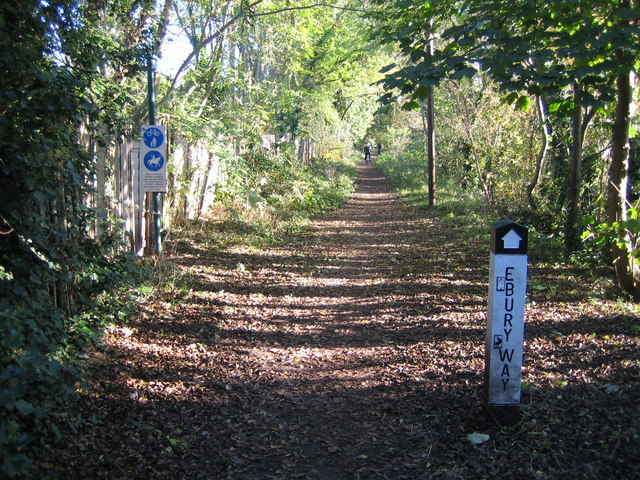
Ebury Way Cycle Path

=== Rickmansworth branch ===
Notwithstanding the introduction of electric services, the Rickmansworth branch suffered in the face of the more direct services to London provided by the Metropolitan. Traffic was also eroded by the increased bus competition and private car ownership. Passenger services ceased in 1952. The Church Street station continued to be used for goods services until 1967 when it was completely closed and the line cut back to serve a papermill near Croxley Green until 20 January 1983, British Rail having retained a contract to carry oil fuel supplies. Today the track has been removed and the platforms and station buildings have been demolished. A considerable length of the trackbed is now used as the Ebury Way Cycle Path.

=== Croxley Green branch ===
Although identified in the Beeching Report for closure, consent was refused and a peak service was run for many years along the Croxley Green branch. In the 1980s, attempts were made to revive the fortunes of the Croxley Green branch: a special football station, Watford Stadium, was built in 1982 for the use of football supporters visiting Watford FC, although it was only used when Watford were playing at home. In 1988, a twice-hourly daytime service was introduced to further revitalise the line, but this was abandoned in May 1993 and services were reduced to one 6.00am return working from Watford Junction on weekdays — a parliamentary train, run specially to avoid the costly process of officially closing the line. The facilities at the two principal stations along the route, Croxley Green and Watford West were significantly downgraded in the late 1980s and early 1990s.The covered platform at Croxley Green was removed in 1989 and replaced with a temporary scaffolding platform with no protection from the elements. Watford West's booking office was demolished leaving an open concrete concourse and gate. At both stations the covered staircases were demolished and replaced with open stairways.

In March 1996, services to Croxley Green ceased when the construction of the new dual-carriageway Ascot Road severed the route between Watford West and Croxley Green. As the line was mothballed rather than formally closed the stations, along with the track, street-level signage and the remaining station facilities, were abandoned rather than demolished, and, apart from the scaffolding platform at Croxley Green, remained in situ for many years. The branch was not formally closed until 2003.

=== Metropolitan line extension ===
A proposed scheme known as the Croxley Rail Link was announced in 2010 by the Department for Transport which planned to extend the London Underground Metropolitan line to Watford Junction by re-opening a section of the Croxley branch of the Watford and Rickmansworth Railway, with two new Tube stations, Cassiobridge and Watford Vicarage Road. Some on-site preparation work was undertaken but the scheme was cancelled in 2018 due to funding problems.

== Sources ==
- Oppitz, Leslie (2005). "3. Lord Ebury's Line". Lost railways of the Chilterns. Newbury: Countryside Books. pp. 40–48. ISBN 9781853066436.
- Davies, R.; Grant, M.D. (1984). Chilterns and Cotswolds (Forgotten Railways). Newton Abbot, Devon: David St John Thomas. pp. 35–38. ISBN 0-946537-07-0.
- Welbourn, N. (1998). Lost Lines London. Shepperton, Surrey: Ian Allan Ltd. pp. 110–112. ISBN 0-7110-2623-8.
