= Denham Golf Club railway station =

Railway station in Buckinghamshire, England

Coordinates: 51.581°N 0.518°W

Denham Golf Club
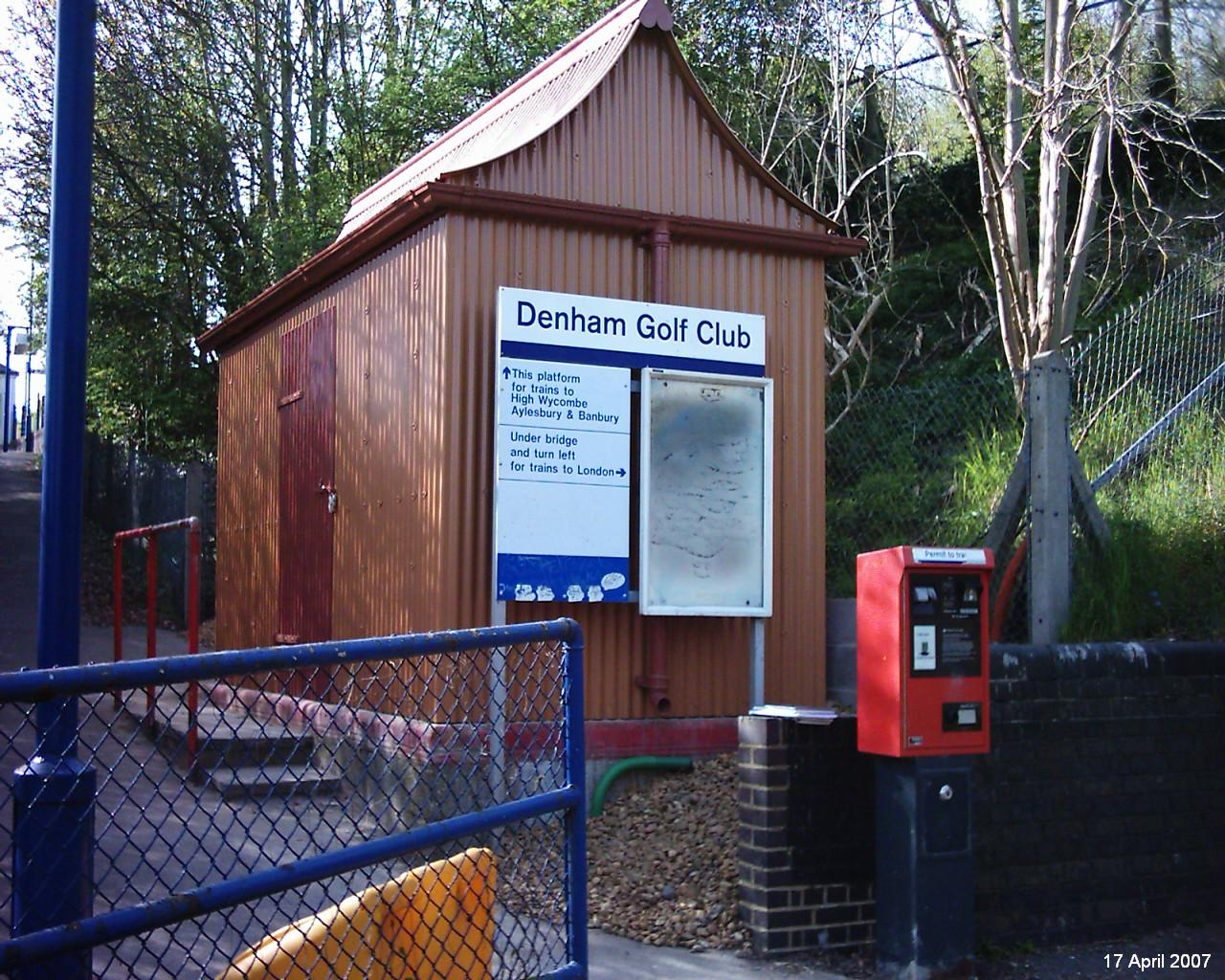

General information
- Location: Higher Denham, Buckinghamshire; England
- Grid reference: TQ028879
- Manager: Chiltern Railways
- Platforms: 2

Other information
- Station code: DGC
- Classification: DfT category F1

History
- Opened: 1912

Passengers
- 2021/22: ▲15,168
- 2022/23: ▲20,636
- 2023/24: ▲27,356
- 2024/25: ▲33,726
- 2025/26: ▲35,324
Location
Notes
- Passenger statistics from the Office of Rail and Road

Denham Golf Club railway station is a railway station near the villages of Baker's Wood and Denham, Buckinghamshire, England. The station is on the Chiltern Main Line between Denham and Gerrards Cross.

== History ==
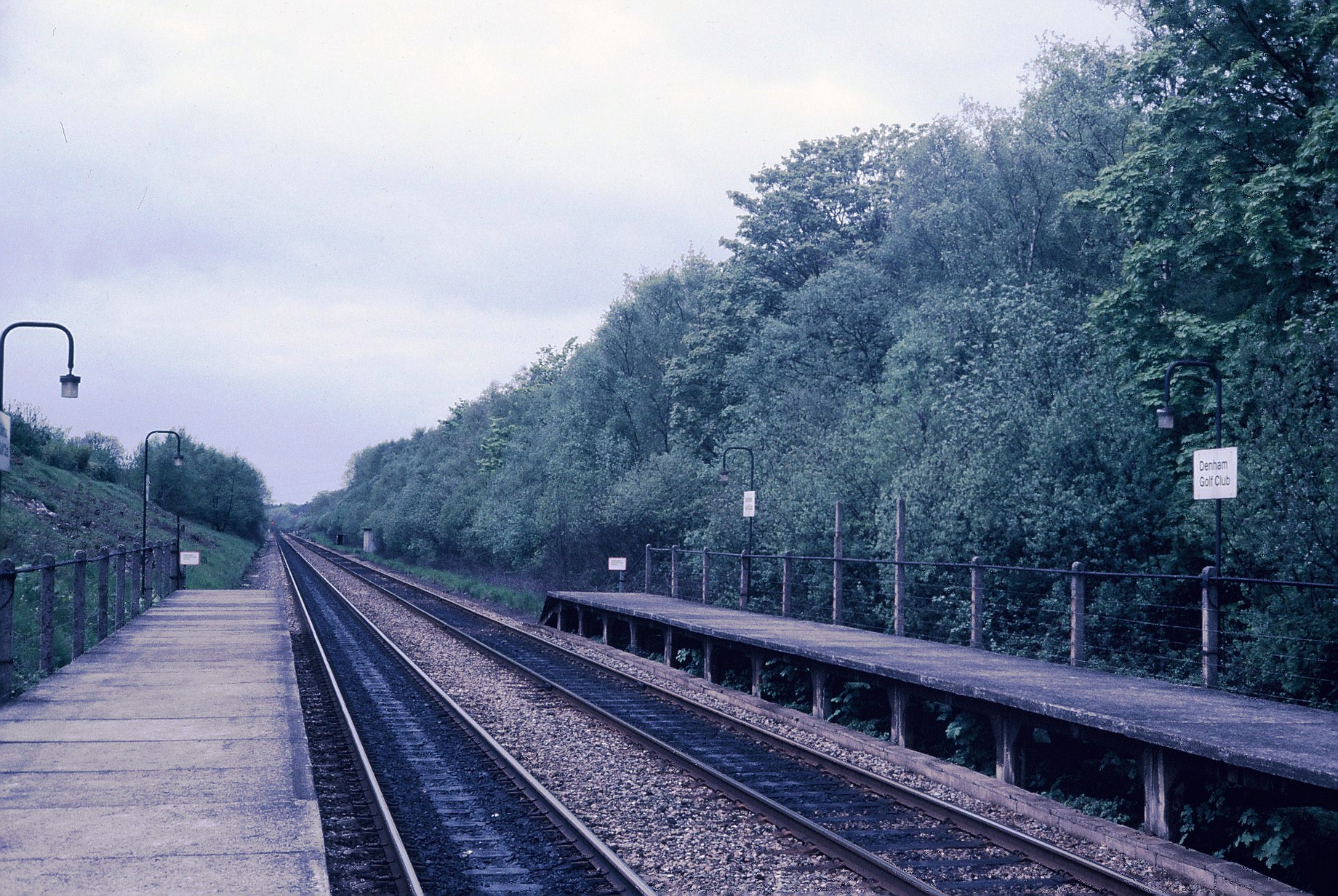
Station in 1985.

The station was opened on 22 July 1912, at the request of the Golf Club, which had opened the previous year. It is on what was the Great Western and Great Central Joint Railway, which had been opened in 1906. The station was originally called Denham Golf Club Platform, and it was built to serve the adjacent golf club. Between the two World Wars the platforms were lengthened and the station was made a halt. The original "up" platform was on the London side of the road bridge, and made of wood, with an access path connecting to the track leading to the Golf Club. In 1954 British Railways had a new concrete "up" platform built on the Wycombe side of the road bridge, opposite the "down" platform, which was also rebuilt in concrete. At the same time a proposed name change to 'Higher Denham' was rejected.

The station was transferred from the Western Region of British Rail to the London Midland Region on 24 March 1974.

The two waiting rooms are original Great Western Railway "pagoda" shelters. The ticket office, at road level on the down side, was also a pagoda building. Both waiting rooms and the original ticket office have been listed buildings since 27 November 1992, to prevent their replacement by the bus shelter type structures then being installed at other stations on the line. The ticket office was damaged by fire in 2005 and demolished early in 2007. It was replaced with a near replica in 2007, but unlike the original the new building has no clerk's window. The waiting rooms have recently been repainted to match the ticket office.

The original platform lamp-posts were cast iron, marked with the initials "G.W. & G.C. Jt" of the original operator. The lamp-posts were removed when the station lighting — and indeed the whole line — were modernised in about 1991, at about the time as the new Class 165 diesel multiple unit trains entered service.

The station was closed between 16 March to 19 June 2015 to allow Network Rail to undertake major repairs.

== Services ==
All services at Denham Golf Club are operated by Chiltern Railways.

The typical weekday off-peak service is one train every two hours between London Marylebone and High Wycombe. Services to and from London operate as stopping services calling at most stations. Additional services call at the station during the peak hours, including some services that run semi-fast to and from London.

On weekends, the service is increased to hourly in each direction and northbound services are extended beyond High Wycombe to and from Aylesbury via Princes Risborough.

Preceding station	National Rail	Following station
Gerrards Cross	Chiltern Railways Chiltern Main Line	Denham
