= Denham railway station =

Railway station in Buckinghamshire, England

Coordinates: 51.579°N 0.497°W

Denham
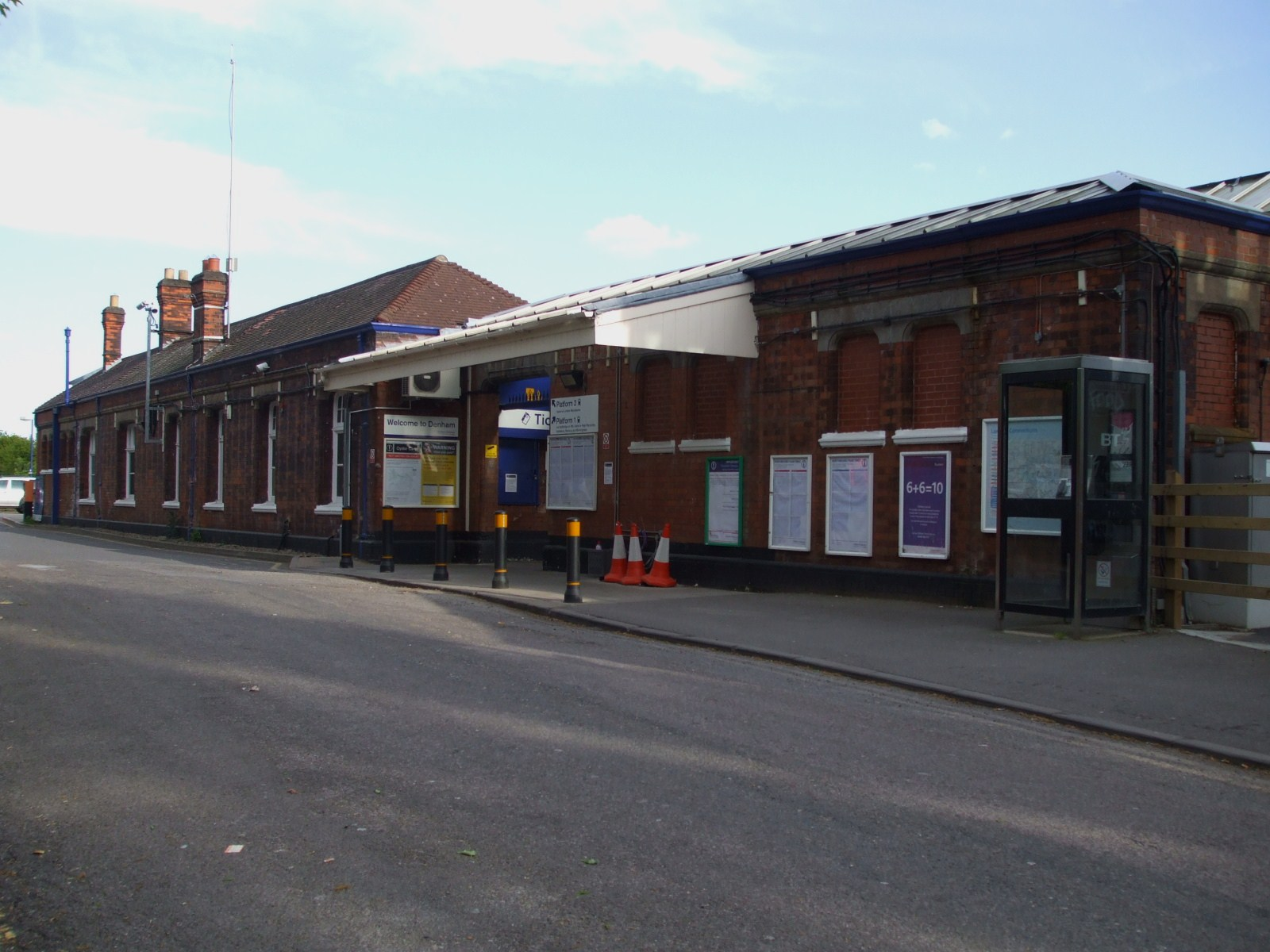

General information
- Location: Denham, Buckinghamshire; England
- Grid reference: TQ042877
- Manager: Chiltern Railways
- Platforms: 2

Other information
- Station code: DNM
- Classification: DfT category E

History
- Opened: 2 April 1906

Passengers
- 2020/21: ▼43,810
- 2021/22: ▲0.134 million
- 2022/23: ▲0.176 million
- 2023/24: ▲0.184 million
- 2024/25: ▲0.212 million
Location
Notes
- Passenger statistics from the Office of Rail and Road

Denham railway station is a railway station in the village of Denham in Buckinghamshire, England. It is on the Chiltern Main Line between West Ruislip and Denham Golf Club.

== History ==
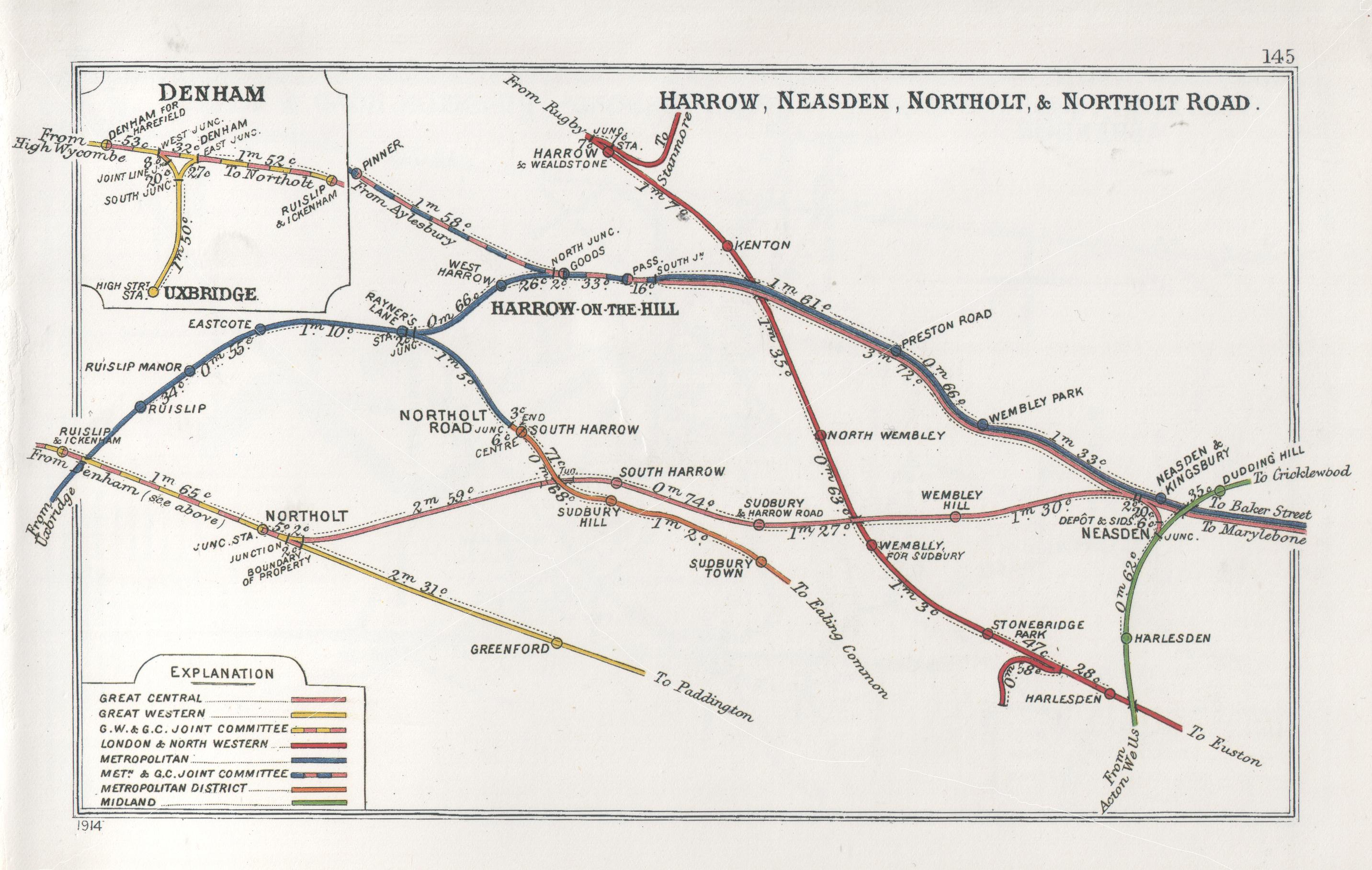
A 1914 Railway Clearing House map showing (upper left) railways in and around Denham

The station was built just north of Denham village as part of the Great Western and Great Central Joint Railway. It opened on 2 April 1906 as Denham for Harefield.

The original station layout had four roads: two for non-stop trains, and two with platforms for stopping services. There was a small goods yard north of the line, and a signal box at the London end of the "down" platform. The two through roads have been removed, being taken up in December 1965, with all services using the platform roads and has since had improved track alignments to allow fast running trains. The signal box closed on 15 June 1975. The former goods yard is now the station car park.

The station was transferred from the Western Region of British Rail to the London Midland Region on 24 March 1974.

After the Gerrards Cross Tunnel collapse in 2005, a temporary 400-space car park was built in a single weekend on the adjacent Denham Airfield.

=== Abandoned Central line extension ===
Under the London Passenger Transport Board's 1935-40 New Works Programme, Denham was to have been the terminus of the Central line's westward extension from North Acton, with Central line platforms south of those on the main line. The continuation to Denham was added in 1937. Work on the extension was postponed in World War II. The introduction of the Metropolitan Green Belt limited the expansion of the London urban area and the extension beyond West Ruislip was cancelled.

=== Development ===
The station was built with a pedestrian underpass linking the platforms, but this was inaccessible to people with impaired mobility. Further, the embankment supporting the "down" (westbound) platform and buildings was subsiding, so the "down" platform has been relocated as an island north of the "down" road, in the gap left by the removal of the original through roads, and to provide a footbridge and lifts, similar to those at Gerrards Cross, for disabled access. The new "down" platform was opened for use in late July 2008, and the original "down" platform and buildings have been removed.

A proposed second phase, providing a third reversible track between the rear of the new platform and the existing "up" (eastbound) platform road, would improve operational flexibility by allowing stopping services to be passed by following non-stop trains.

== Services ==
All services at Denham are operated by Chiltern Railways.

The typical off-peak service is one train per hour in each direction between London Marylebone and High Wycombe. Services to and from London operate as stopping services calling at most stations. Additional services call at the station during the peak hours, including some services that run semi-fast to and from London.

On weekends, northbound services are extended beyond High Wycombe to and from Aylesbury via Princes Risborough.

Preceding station	National Rail	Following station
Denham Golf Club	Chiltern Railways Chiltern Main Line	West Ruislip
	Historical railways	
Denham Golf Club Line and station open	Great Western and Great Central Joint Railway	South Harefield Halt Line open, station closed
	Disused railways	
Terminus	Great Western Railway Uxbridge High Street Branch	Uxbridge High Street Line and station closed
	Abandoned plans	
Preceding station	LUL	Following station
Terminus	Central line	Harefield Road towards Epping, Hainault or Woodford via Newbury Park

== Cultural use ==
Denham Station served as "New Milton station" in the 1949 British comedy The Chiltern Hundreds, starring Cecil Parker and David Tomlinson.

In the episode "Queen and Country" of season 9 of the TV series New Tricks, Denham station was the location used for an unspecified station in Exeter.

In episode 6, "Home Sweet Home", of series 2 of TV sitcom The Good Life, the Goods are dropped off by Mr May outside the main building at Denham station after viewing a smallholding.

== See also ==
- Harefield Road tube station - a station between Denham and West Ruislip that would have been built if the Central line extension to Denham had been built.
- Acton-Northolt Line
