= Harefield Road tube station =

Unbuilt London Underground station

Harefield Road
- Location of Harefield Road in Greater London
- Location: Uxbridge
- Local authority: London Borough of Hillingdon
- Grid reference: TQ060874
- Owner: Never built
- Number of platforms: 2

Railway companies
- Original company: London Underground

Other information
- Coordinates: 51.5760°N 0.4710°W

Harefield Road was a proposed London Underground station on the western branch of the Central line beyond its current terminus at West Ruislip.

Under the London Passenger Transport Board's 1935–1940 New Works programme, the station would have been built alongside the existing Great Western and Great Central Joint Railway (GW&GCJR) line between West Ruislip and Denham as the penultimate station on the Central line's extension from North Acton. (Note: The extension from North Acton involved construction of two new tracks for the Central line parallel to and on the south side of the GW&GCJR tracks.)

Like many other new stations built by London Underground on the outskirts of the capital, the construction of the station was intended to stimulate new housing developments in what was a rural part of Middlesex. Works on the extension were postponed during World War II and, after the war, green belt legislation was introduced to limit the expansion of urban areas. The area beyond West Ruislip fell within the designated Metropolitan Green Belt, and, as the intended housing developments were no longer allowed, the extension beyond West Ruislip was cancelled. (Note: The extension to West Ruislip opened to Greenford in 1947 and to West Ruislip in 1948.)

== Earlier station ==
The line through the station site was opened for goods services by the GW&GCJR on 20 November 1905 with passenger services beginning on 2 April 1906. and had previously been occupied by a short-lived station.

On 24 September 1928, the GW&GCJR opened a station as Harefield Halt. This was renamed South Harefield Halt in May 1929. A goods yard was served from 27 June 1929. The station was 2 miles (3.2 km) south of Harefield village and usage was low, so the halt and goods yard were closed on 30 September 1931.

== Notes and references ==
=== Bibliography ===
- Brown, Joe (2015) [2006]. London Railway Atlas (4th ed.). Ian Allan. ISBN 978-0-7110-3819-6.
- Bruce, J Graeme; Croome, Desmond F (2006) [1996]. The Central Line (2nd ed.). Capital Transport. ISBN 978-1-85414-297-9.
- Butt, R.V.J. (1995). The Directory of Railway Stations. Yeovil: Patrick Stephens Ltd. p. 114. ISBN 1-85260-508-1. R508.
- Rose, Douglas (2016) [1980]. The London Underground, A Diagrammatic History (9th ed.). Douglas Rose/Capital Transport. ISBN 978-1-85414-404-1.

Historical railways
Preceding station	National Rail	Following station
Denham Line and station open	Great Western and Great Central Joint Railway	West Ruislip Line and station open
Disused railways
Uxbridge High Street; Line and station closed	Great Western Railway; Uxbridge High Street branch	West Ruislip; Line and station open
Abandoned plans
Proposed Denham extension
Preceding station	London Underground	Following station
Denham Terminus	Central line	West Ruislip towards Epping, Hainault or Woodford via Newbury Park
