= Uxbridge High Street railway station =

Former railway station in England

Coordinates: 51.5504°N 0.4833°W

Uxbridge High Street

General information
- Location: Uxbridge, London Borough of Hillingdon; England
- Grid reference: TQ052845
- Platforms: 1

Other information
- Status: Disused

History
- Original company: Great Western Railway
- Pre-grouping: GWR
- Post-grouping: GWR

Key dates
- 1 May 1907: Station opened for passengers
- 11 May 1914: Opened to goods traffic
- 1 January 1917: Service suspended
- 3 May 1920: Service resumed
- 25 September 1939: Passenger service ceased
- 24 February 1964: Goods service ceased and station closed
Location

Uxbridge High Street railway station in Uxbridge, England, was on what is now Oxford Road near its junction with Sanderson Road. It was the southern terminus and only station on the Great Western Railway (GWR) branch line from the GWR/GCR joint line, which is now the Chiltern Main Line.

== History ==
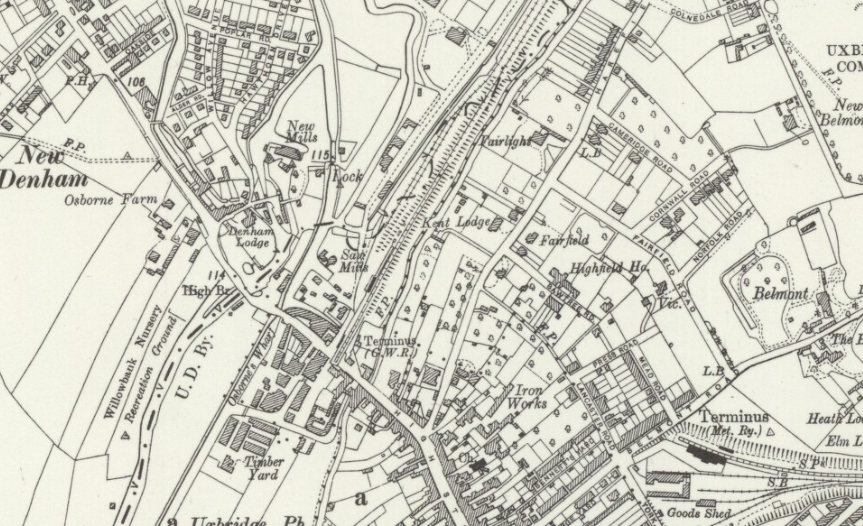
Uxbridge High Street station on a 1935 Ordnance Survey map

The station opened on 1 May 1907, with the intention that the branch was to be extended across the town to a point just south of Uxbridge Vine Street railway station, the terminus of the GWR branch from West Drayton. Some land was purchased and the lines extended over High Street on a bridge, but the proposal was abandoned in 1914.

Services were suspended between January 1917 and May 1920.

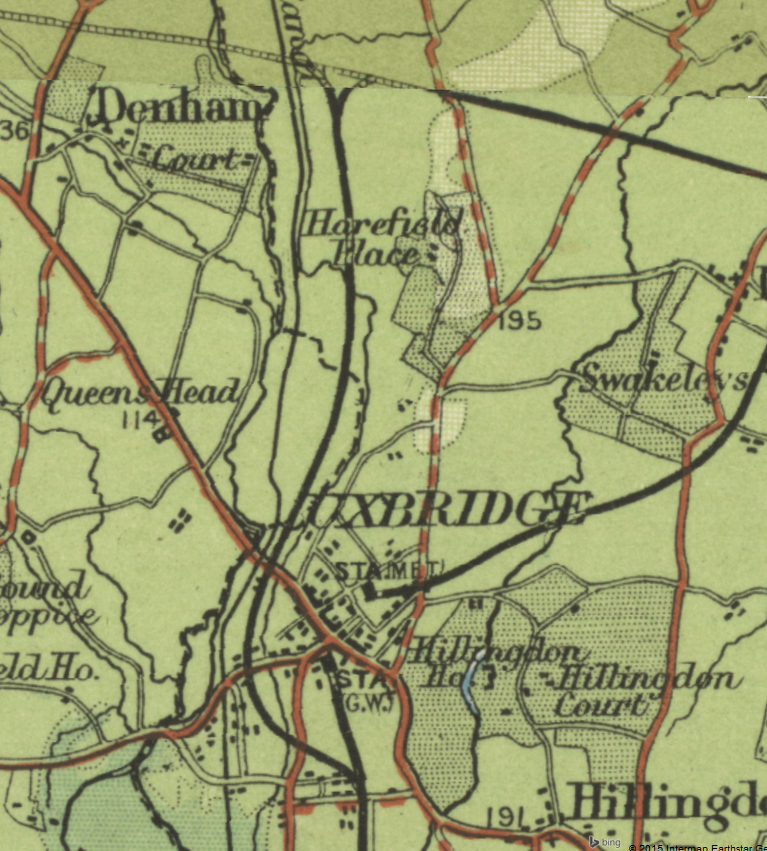
Denham Junction to Uxbridge branch as planned shown on a 1903 map

The branch ran along the west side of Shire Ditch and Frays River and through the centre of the present Denham Country Park. A triangular junction with the main line at the north end connected west towards Denham and east towards West Ruislip. The three junctions were named Denham South, Denham West and Denham East. The curve between the South and East Junctions was little used, and closed during World War I.

The locations of the curves joining the main line can be seen in the landscape today, forming the northern perimeters of the park's northern lake and woodland adjacent to Uxbridge Golf Course.

The station closed to passengers on 25 September 1939, goods services continued until the station closed completely on 24 February 1964.

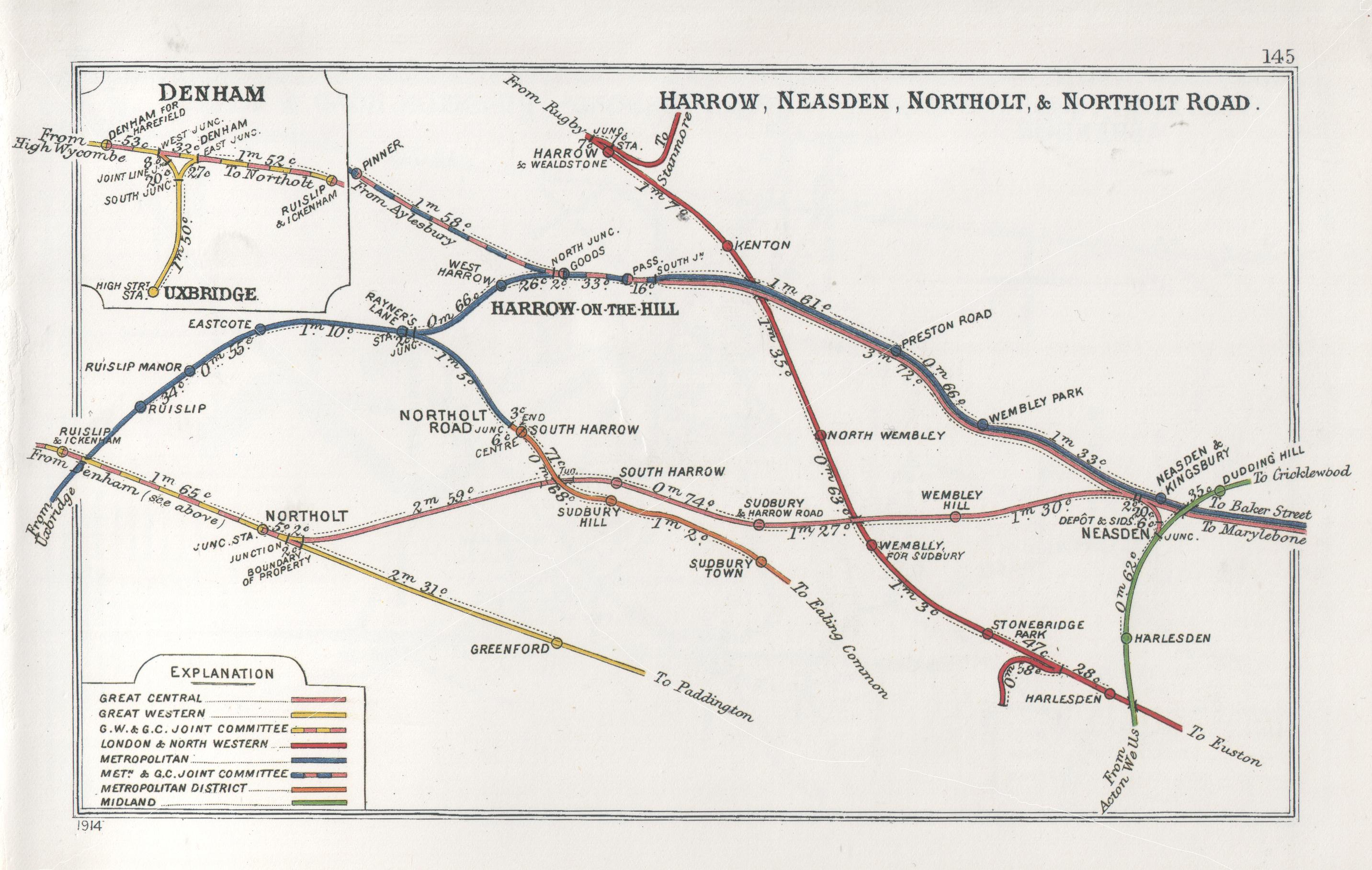
A 1914 Railway Clearing House map of railways in the vicinity of Uxbridge (inset, upper left)

Most services from Uxbridge High Street ran to Denham via Denham West Junction, with some extended two stations further west to Gerrards Cross.

== See also ==
- Uxbridge tube station
- List of London railway stations

Preceding station	Disused railways	Following station
Denham; Line closed, station open	Great Western Railway; Uxbridge High Street branch	Terminus
South Harefield Halt; Line and station closed	Great Western Railway; Uxbridge High Street branch	Terminus
