= West Ruislip station =

London Underground and railway station

West Ruislip
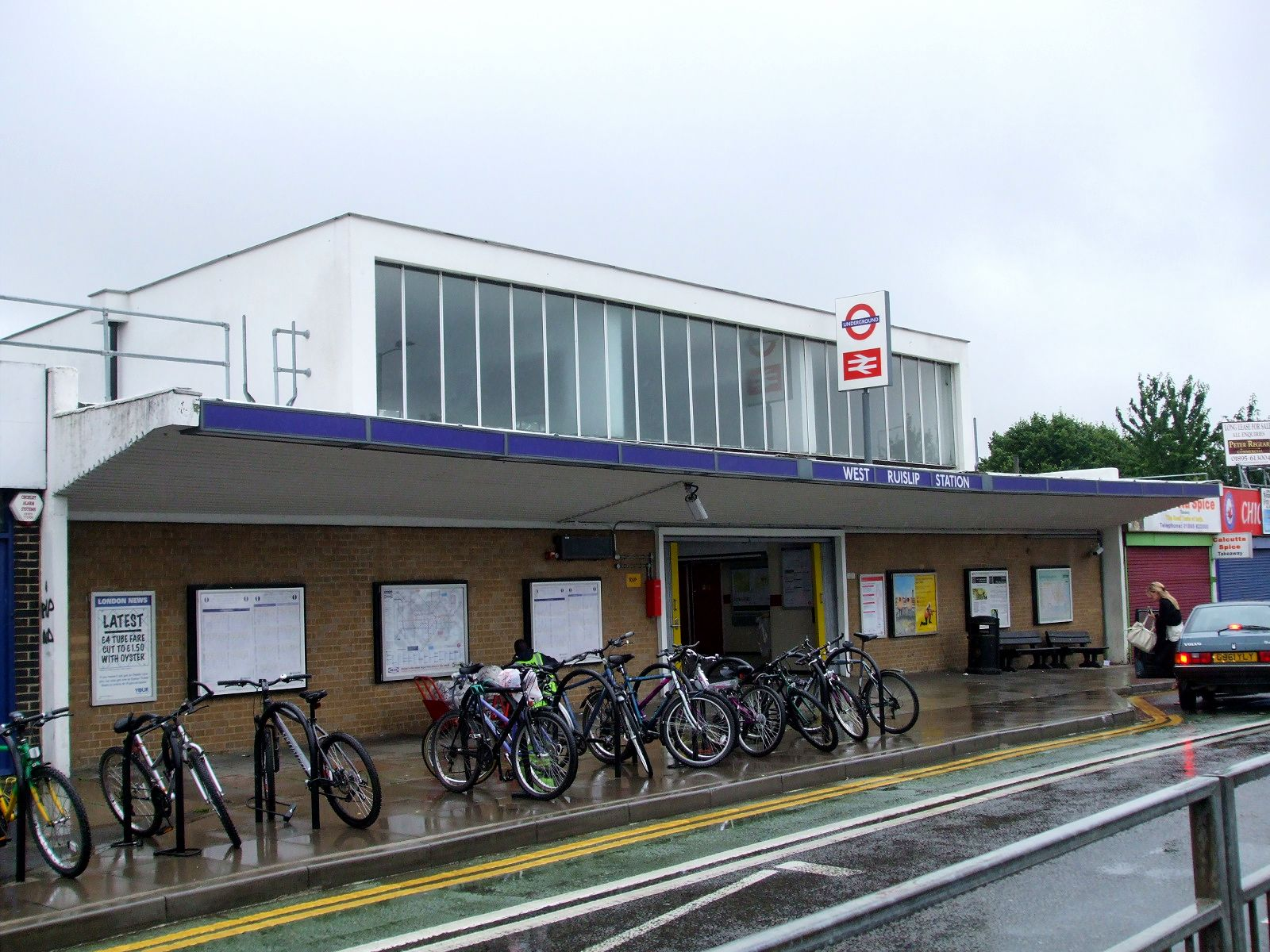
- West Ruislip station
- Interactive map of West Ruislip

General information
- Location: Ruislip
- Local authority: London Borough of Hillingdon
- Managed by: London Underground
- Owner: Transport for London
- Station code: WRU
- DfT category: F1
- Number of platforms: 4
- Fare zone: 6
- OSI: Ickenham

London Underground annual entry and exit
- 2021: ▲0.71 million
- 2022: ▲1.14 million
- 2023: ▲1.21 million
- 2024: ▲1.42 million
- 2025: ▼1.41 million

National Rail annual entry and exit
- 2020–21: ▼43,442
- Interchange: ▼866
- 2021–22: ▲0.121 million
- Interchange: ▲2,648
- 2022–23: ▲0.154 million
- Interchange: ▼1,756
- 2023–24: ▼0.141 million
- Interchange: ▲7,267
- 2024–25: ▼0.136 million
- Interchange: ▲9,636

Key dates
- 2 April 1906: Opened (GWR/GCR)
- 21 November 1948: Opened (Central line)

Other information
- External links: TfL station info page; Departures; Facilities
- Coordinates: 51.5696°N 0.4373°W

West Ruislip (/ˈwɛst ˈraɪslɪp/) is an interchange station on Ickenham High Road on the borders of Ickenham and western Ruislip in the London Borough of Hillingdon in Greater London, England, formerly in the county of Middlesex. It is served by London Underground and National Rail. On the London Underground, the station is one of the two western termini of the Central line and the next station towards east is Ruislip Gardens. It is also on the Chiltern Railways of the National Rail. The Central line and Chiltern Railways platforms and ticket office hall are managed by LU.

The closest station on the Metropolitan and Piccadilly lines is Ickenham, 1.1 miles (1.8 km) from this station.

== History ==
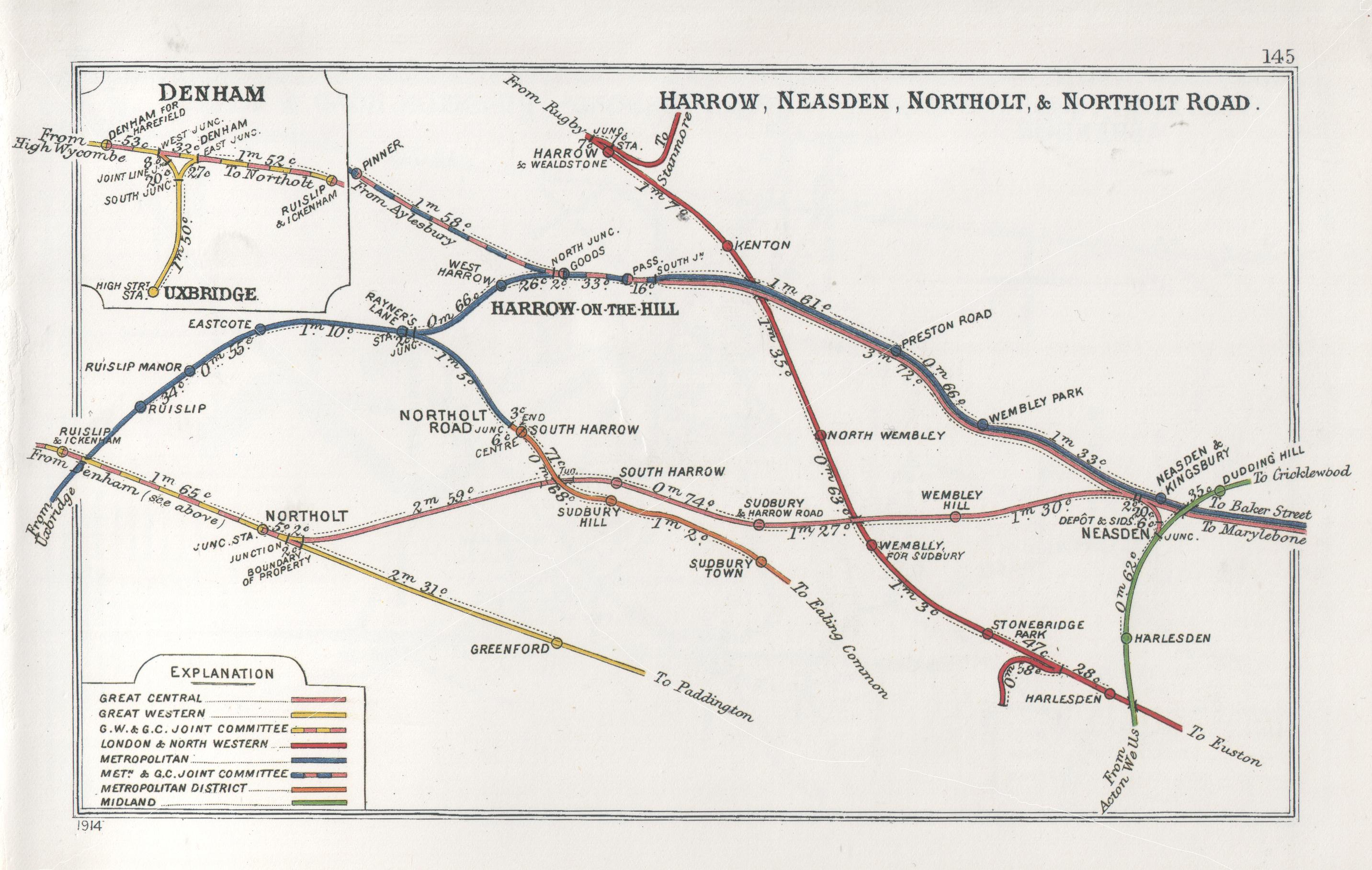
A 1914 Railway Clearing House map of railways in the vicinity of West Ruislip (shown here as Ruislip & Ickenham)

The station was opened on 2 April 1906 as Ruislip & Ickenham by the Great Western and Great Central Joint Railway (GW&GCJR). The GW&GCJR connected London and the Midlands via High Wycombe and provided an alternative route to the Great Central Railway's (GCR's) main line through Aylesbury, Harrow and Wembley which shared its route with the Metropolitan Railway.

Prior to the Second World War plans had been made for a number of extensions to the Central line. The London Passenger Transport Board's (LPTB's) 1935-40 New Works programme included the extension of the Central line to run alongside the Great Western Railway (GWR) tracks from North Acton to South Ruislip and the GW&GCJR tracks from there as far as Denham; the post-war introduction of the Metropolitan Green Belt caused the extension to be cut back to West Ruislip. Had the Central line extension been completed as planned, the next station would have been Harefield Road. Preparatory work on this section had started just before the war and a section of trackbed constructed for the extension can be seen to the west of the road overbridge, beyond the buffer stops of the Central line tracks alongside the National Rail line.

The additional tracks were constructed by the GWR on behalf of the LPTB and on 30 June 1947, the first section of the western extension opened from North Acton to Greenford. On the same date the station name was changed to West Ruislip (for Ickenham).

Central line services began running from West Ruislip on 21 November 1948.

The station building was built by British Railways for London Underground and was not completed until the 1960s At about the same time the sub-title was omitted from the station name. Some Central line stations with older signage still show the longer name on the line diagrams on their platforms.

The station was transferred from the Western Region of British Rail to the London Midland Region on 24 March 1974.

The London Borough of Hillingdon announced in June 2011 that it would be lobbying Transport for London to have the Central line extended from West Ruislip to Uxbridge. Such a project would require a business case approved by TfL and the completion of signal upgrade work on the Metropolitan line.

== Services ==
=== National Rail ===
National Rail services at West Ruislip are operated by Chiltern Railways.

The station's weekday off-peak service pattern is unusual in that it's served by trains at different frequencies in each direction. The station is served by one train per hour to London Marylebone and one train every two hours to High Wycombe. Services to and from London operate as stopping services calling at most stations. Additional services call at the station during the peak hours.

On weekends, the service is increased to hourly in each direction and northbound services are extended beyond High Wycombe to and from Aylesbury via Princes Risborough.

=== London Underground ===
On the London Underground, West Ruislip is one of the two western termini of the Central line and the next station is Ruislip Gardens to the east. The typical off-peak London Underground service on the Central line is 8 trains per hour (a train every 7.5 minutes) to and from Epping. During the peak hours, this is increased to up to 12 trains per hour to and from various destinations.

Preceding station	National Rail	Following station
Denham	Chiltern Railways Chiltern Main Line	South Ruislip
London Underground
Terminus	Central line	Ruislip Gardens towards Epping, Hainault or Woodford via Newbury Park
	Historical railways	
South Harefield Halt Line open, station closed	Great Western and Great Central Joint Railway	Ruislip Gardens Line and station open
South Harefield Halt Line open, station closed	Great Western Railway Uxbridge High Street Branch	Ruislip Gardens Line and station open

== Connections ==
London Buses routes 278, U1 and U10 serve the station.

== Nearby places ==
- Ruislip
- Ickenham
- Adjacent to the station is the former site of RAF West Ruislip, which until 2006 was a co-located United States Navy facility and elementary school, leased from the Ministry of Defence. This has been redeveloped for residential use.
