= South Ruislip station =

London Underground and railway station

South Ruislip
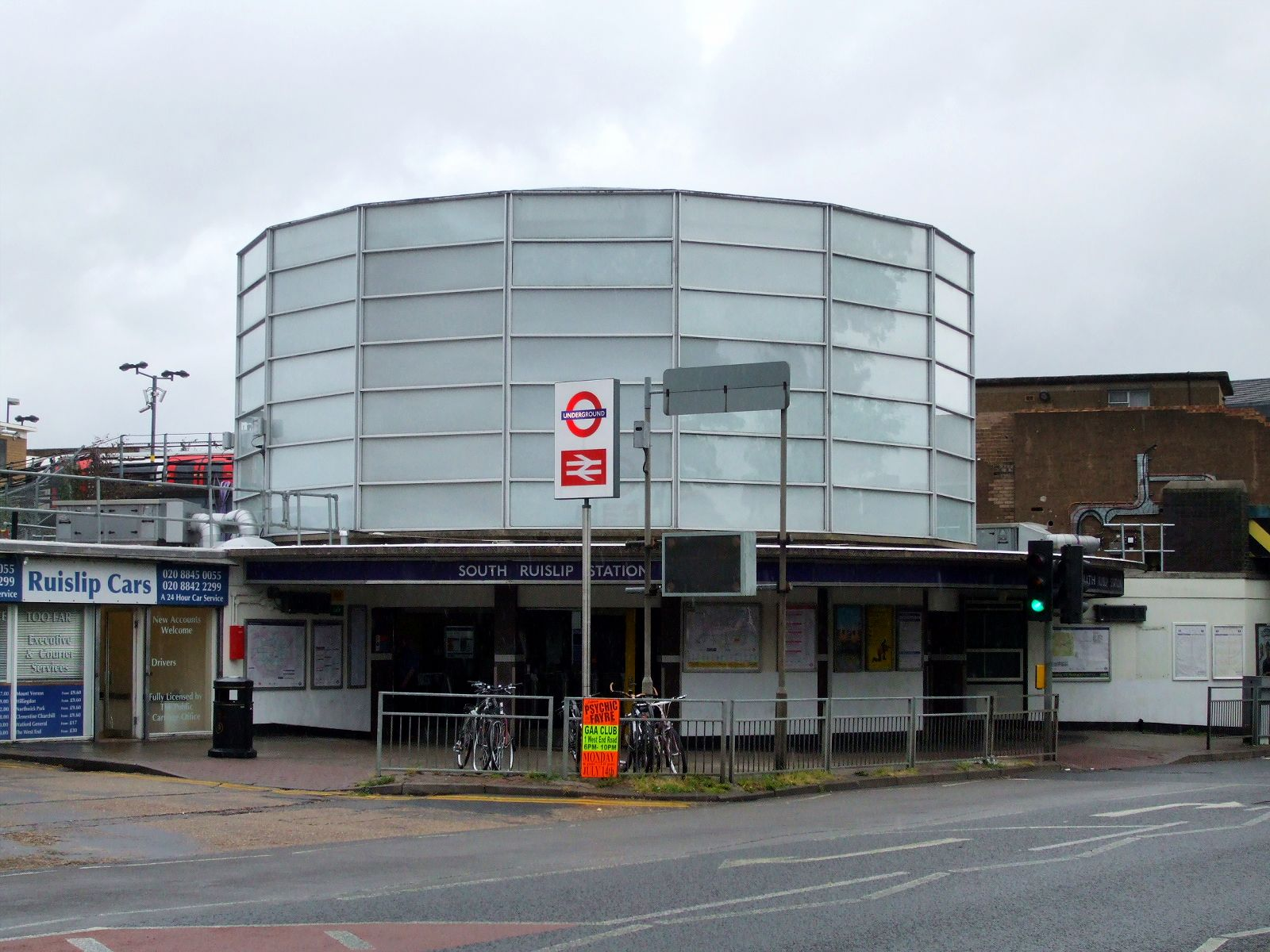
- Station building in July 2008
- Interactive map of South Ruislip

General information
- Location: South Ruislip
- Local authority: London Borough of Hillingdon
- Managed by: London Underground
- Owner: London Underground
- Station code: SRU
- DfT category: F1
- Number of platforms: 4
- Fare zone: 5

London Underground annual entry and exit
- 2020: ▼0.99 million
- 2021: ▼0.89 million
- 2022: ▲1.41 million
- 2023: ▲1.50 million
- 2024: ▲1.62 million

National Rail annual entry and exit
- 2020–21: ▼58,664
- 2021–22: ▲0.129 million
- 2022–23: ▲0.153 million
- 2023–24: ▼0.123 million
- 2024–25: ▲0.165 million

Key dates
- 1906: Tracks laid (GW & GCR)
- 1 May 1908: Opened (GW & GCR)
- 21 November 1948: Started (Central line)

Other information
- External links: TfL station info page; Departures; Facilities
- Coordinates: 51.5565°N 0.3988°W

South Ruislip (/ˈsaʊθ ˈraɪslɪp/) is a station served by London Underground and Chiltern Railways in South Ruislip in West London. The station is owned, managed and staffed by London Underground. The station is in London fare zone 5.

== History ==
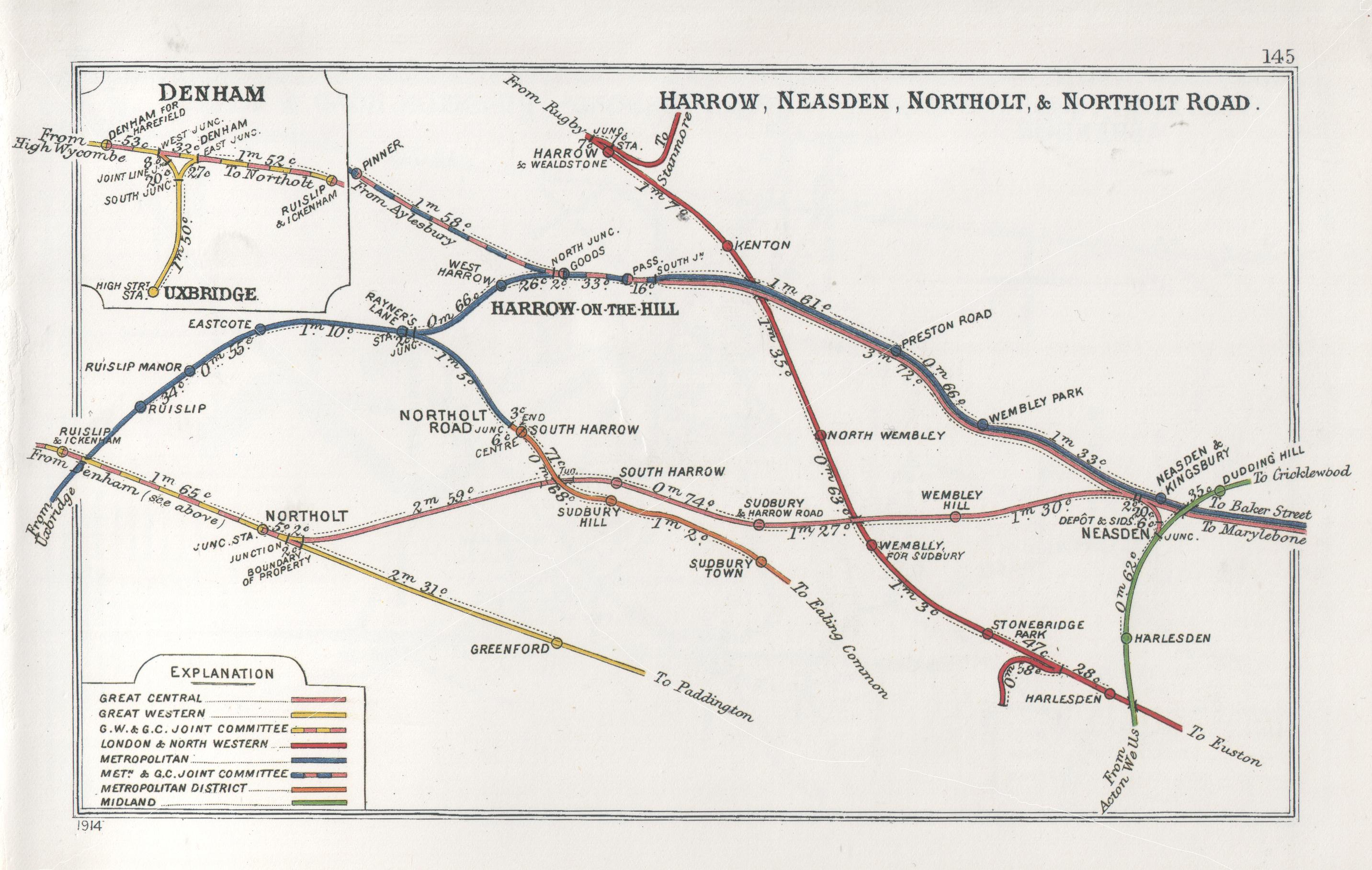
A 1914 Railway Clearing House map of railways in the vicinity of South Ruislip (shown here as Northolt Junction)

The GWR/GCR Joint line to High Wycombe carried services from both Paddington and Marylebone. They met at Northolt Junction, situated slightly to the east of the station, from where four tracks ran westwards to Ruislip Gardens and West Ruislip; there the route shrank to two tracks only. Opened on 1 May 1908 and originally known as Northolt Junction, the station became South Ruislip & Northolt Junction from September 1932 and received its present name on 30 June 1947.

The station was designed by Brian Lewis and F.F.C. Curtis and first served by Central line trains on 21 November 1948 when the Central line extension from London towards West Ruislip was completed after being delayed by World War II. The rounded booking hall was not completed until 1960. The concrete, glass and granite chip frieze in the booking hall is one of the earliest public works by glass artist, Henry Haig.

In late 1973 and early 1974 the track layout was simplified and the manual signal box was removed in early 1990, along with other manual signal boxes on this line, and its function replaced by colour light signalling and power operated points, both controlled from Marylebone. The track alignments were improved to allow higher speed running at the junction for the services from Marylebone, and the pointwork which had allowed trains from Paddington to call at the westbound Chiltern station platform was removed. All eastbound services were moved to the former through road; the eastbound road, which had formerly extended from the platform road at West Ruislip, was closed and lifted, and the eastbound platform widened. The alignment of the turnout towards Marylebone was improved to allow higher-speed running. Fragments of the old trackwork can still be seen to the north of the line at this point. The trackwork at this station has been upgraded and now permits higher speed running up to 100 miles per hour (160 km/h).

The station was transferred from the Western Region of British Rail to the London Midland Region on 24 March 1974.

== The station in the 21st century ==
Ticket barriers control access to all platforms.

The lines to Marylebone formerly passed either side of West Waste. As part of Chiltern Railways' Evergreen 3 route improvements works, Northolt Junction was remodelled and included provision to the north of the waste transfer depot of a new down main line alongside the existing up main to allow services to be accelerated. The new down main line has a line speed limit of 100 miles per hour (160 km/h) compared with the former 60 miles per hour (97 km/h). The existing down main was remodelled to become the down loop line, used by trains stopping at South Ruislip station.

The bridge outside which carries the lines over Long Drive is lower than others locally at 11 feet 9 inches (3.58 m) and is often hit by high vehicles. Either side of it, false deck beams have been installed so the danger of any impacts causing damage to the bridge itself has been lessened.

== Services ==
=== National Rail ===
National Rail services at South Ruislip are operated by Chiltern Railways. (2023)

The station's weekday off-peak service pattern is unusual in that it's served by trains at different frequencies in each direction. The station is served by one train every two hours to London Marylebone and one train per hour to High Wycombe. Services to and from London operate as stopping services calling at most stations. Additional services call at the station during the peak hours.

On weekends, the service is increased to hourly in each direction and northbound services are extended beyond High Wycombe to and from Aylesbury via Princes Risborough.

=== London Underground ===
The typical off-peak London Underground service on the Central line in trains per hour is:

- 9 tph to West Ruislip (2023)
- 9 tph to Epping (2023)

Additional services call at the station during the peak hours, increasing the service to up to 12 tph in each direction.

Preceding station	London Underground	Following station
Ruislip Gardens towards West Ruislip	Central line Ruislip branch	Northolt towards Epping, Hainault or Woodford via Newbury Park
Preceding station	National Rail	Following station
West Ruislip	Chiltern Railways Chiltern Main Line	Northolt Park
Disused railways
Ruislip Gardens	Great Western and Great Central Joint Railway	Northolt Park
Ruislip Gardens	Great Western Railway New North Main Line	Northolt

== Connections ==
London Buses routes 114 and E7 and night route N118 serve the station.
