= Baker's Wood =

Hamlet in Buckinghamshire, England

Coordinates: 51.572°N 0.518°W

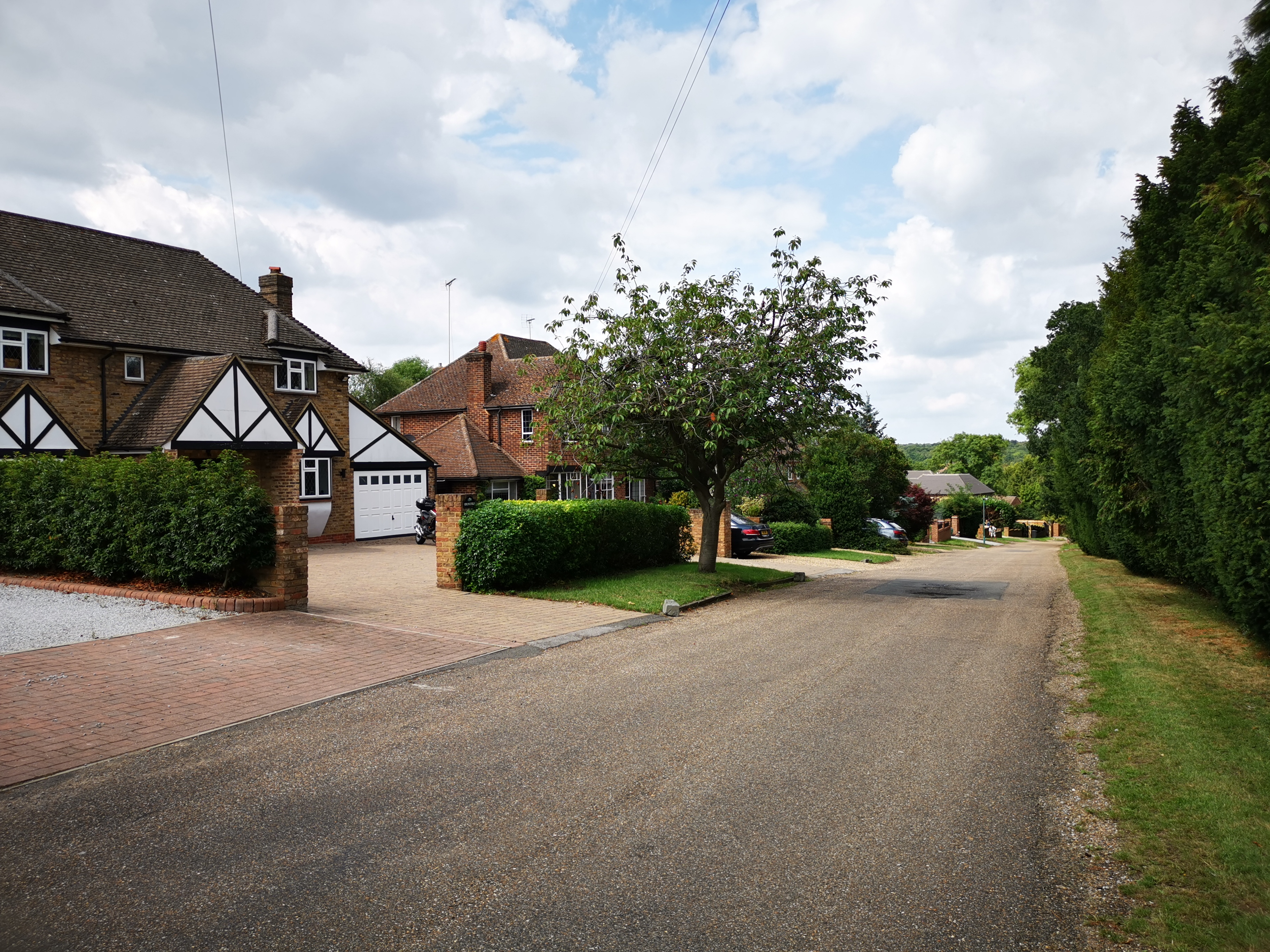
- Residential street

- Location within Buckinghamshire
- OS grid reference: TQ0287
- Unitary authority: Buckinghamshire
- Ceremonial county: Buckinghamshire
- Region: South East
- Country: England
- Sovereign state: United Kingdom
- Post town: UXBRIDGE
- Postcode district: UB9
- Police: Thames Valley
- Fire: Buckinghamshire
- Ambulance: South Central

Baker's Wood is a hamlet 2 miles west of Denham (where at the 2011 Census the population was included) off the A40 in Buckinghamshire, England.

The hamlet has a private road designation and a residents' association, which looks after the interests of the residents, maintenance of verges (in trust) and the road.
