= Uxbridge Vine Street railway station =

Former railway station in England

Coordinates: 51.5444°N 0.4791°W

Uxbridge Vine Street
- Uxbridge Vine Street in 1962

General information
- Location: Uxbridge, Hillingdon; England
- Grid reference: TQ 0552 8389
- Platforms: 3

Other information
- Status: Disused

History
- Original company: Great Western Railway
- Pre-grouping: GWR
- Post-grouping: GWR

Key dates
- 8 September 1856: Station opened for passengers
- 9 October 1871: Line reopened as standard gauge
- 1881: Line doubled
- 10 September 1962: Passenger service ceased
- 24 February 1964: Goods service ceased
- 13 July 1964: Station closed
Location

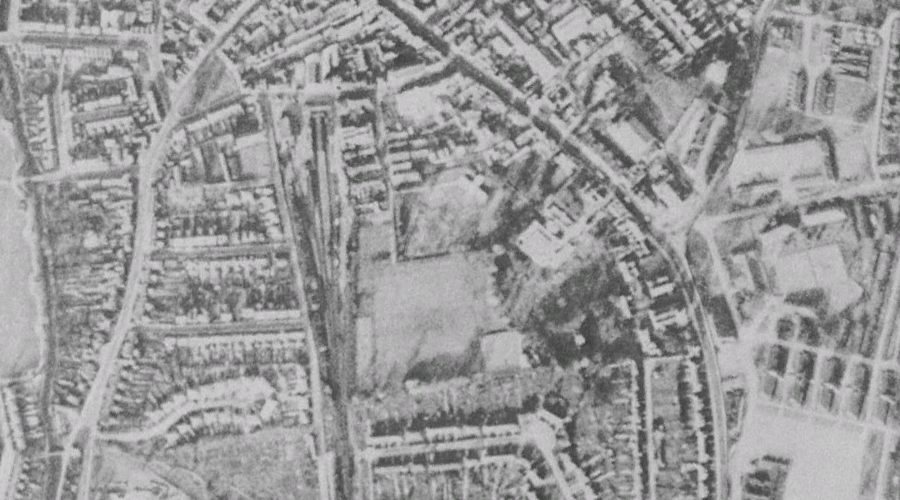
Uxbridge Vine Street station in 1945

Uxbridge Vine Street station opened on 8 September 1856 as Uxbridge Station and was the earliest of three railway stations in Uxbridge, London.

== History ==
When opened, it was the northern terminus of the Great Western Railway's Uxbridge branch from the main line at West Drayton. South from Uxbridge town centre, the line ran near Whitehall Road and Cleveland Road.

In November 1885, the Staines West branch opened sharing a short section of the Vine Street branch to connect to the main line. An intermediate station at Cowley opened in 1904.

The Uxbridge Branch continued to be operated under British Rail until 10 September 1962, when the service from West Drayton was withdrawn and Uxbridge Vine Street station was closed to passengers. Goods traffic ceased two years later with the exception of the line south of the Grand Union Canal on which freight services were operated to the Middlesex Oil and Chemical Works in Yiewsley until 8 January 1979. Demolition of Uxbridge Vine Street station occurred in 1969. Hillingdon Road now covers its site.

=== Uxbridge and Rickmansworth Railway ===
Uxbridge and Rickmansworth Railway Act 1861
- Act of Parliament
- Parliament of the United Kingdom
- Long title: An Act for making a Railway from Uxbridge in the County of Middlesex to Rickmansworth in the County of Hertford, with a Branch to Scott's Bridge Mill, to be called "The Uxbridge and Rickmansworth Railway," and for other Purposes.
- Citation: 24 & 25 Vict. c. lxxiii
- Territorial extent: United Kingdom

Dates
- Royal assent: 28 June 1861
- Commencement: 28 June 1861 (Note: The Acts of Parliament (Commencement) Act 1793.)
- Repealed: 31 January 2013

Other legislation
- Repealed by: Statute Law (Repeals) Act 2013

Status: Repealed

Uxbridge and Rickmansworth Railway Act 1862
- Act of Parliament
- Parliament of the United Kingdom
- Long title: An Act to enable the Uxbridge and Rickmansworth Railway Company to make a Deviation of their authorized Line of Railway; and for other Purposes.
- Citation: 25 & 26 Vict. c. xxxvi
- Territorial extent: United Kingdom

Dates
- Royal assent: 3 June 1862
- Commencement: 3 June 1862
- Repealed: 31 January 2013

Other legislation
- Repealed by: Statute Law (Repeals) Act 2013

Status: Repealed

Uxbridge and Rickmansworth Railway Amendment Act 1863 (Note: Section 1.)
- Act of Parliament
- Parliament of the United Kingdom
- Long title: An Act to extend the Time for making the Uxbridge and Rickmansworth Railway.
- Citation: 26 & 27 Vict. c. clxxiii
- Territorial extent: United Kingdom

Dates
- Royal assent: 21 July 1863
- Commencement: 21 July 1863
- Repealed: 31 January 2013

Other legislation
- Repealed by: Statute Law (Repeals) Act 2013

Status: Repealed

Text of statute as originally enacted

Uxbridge and Rickmansworth Railway (Further Time) Act 1868
- Act of Parliament
- Parliament of the United Kingdom
- Long title: An Act to extend the Time for the Purchase of Lands, and for the Completion of the Uxbridge and Rickmansworth Railway.
- Citation: 31 & 32 Vict. c. li
- Territorial extent: United Kingdom

Dates
- Royal assent: 25 June 1868
- Commencement: 25 June 1868
- Repealed: 31 January 2013

Other legislation
- Repealed by: Statute Law (Repeals) Act 2013

Status: Repealed

Text of statute as originally enacted

Uxbridge and Rickmansworth Railway Act 1881
- Act of Parliament
- Parliament of the United Kingdom
- Long title: An Act for making a Railway from Uxbridge, in the county of Middlesex, to Rickmansworth, in the county of Hertford; and for other purposes.
- Citation: 44 & 45 Vict. c. clxxv
- Territorial extent: United Kingdom

Dates
- Royal assent: 11 August 1881
- Commencement: 11 August 1881
- Repealed: 16 May 1888

Other legislation
- Repealed by: Uxbridge and Rickmansworth Railway (Abandonment) Act 1888

Status: Repealed

Text of statute as originally enacted

Uxbridge and Rickmansworth Railway Act 1884
- Act of Parliament
- Parliament of the United Kingdom
- Long title: An Act to extend the Time for the Compulsory Purchase of Lands for the Uxbridge and Rickmansworth Railway.
- Citation: 47 & 48 Vict. c. cxciii
- Territorial extent: United Kingdom

Dates
- Royal assent: 28 July 1884
- Commencement: 28 July 1884
- Repealed: 31 January 2013

Other legislation
- Repealed by: Statute Law (Repeals) Act 2013

Status: Repealed

Text of statute as originally enacted

Uxbridge and Rickmansworth Railway Act 1886
- Act of Parliament
- Parliament of the United Kingdom
- Long title: An Act to authorise a deviation of part of the Uxbridge and Rickmansworth Railway; to extend the time for completion; to enable the Company to raise further Capital; and for other purposes.
- Citation: 49 & 50 Vict. c. xcii
- Territorial extent: United Kingdom

Dates
- Royal assent: 25 June 1886
- Commencement: 25 June 1886
- Repealed: 16 May 1888

Other legislation
- Repealed by: Uxbridge and Rickmansworth Railway (Abandonment) Act 1888

Status: Repealed

Text of statute as originally enacted

Uxbridge and Rickmansworth Railway (Abandonment) Act 1888
- Act of Parliament
- Parliament of the United Kingdom
- Long title: An Act for the abandonment of the Uxbridge and Rickmansworth Railway.
- Citation: 51 & 52 Vict. c. x
- Territorial extent: United Kingdom

Dates
- Royal assent: 16 May 1888
- Commencement: 16 May 1888
- Repealed: 31 January 2013

Other legislation
- Repeals/revokes: Uxbridge and Rickmansworth Railway Act 1881; Uxbridge and Rickmansworth Railway Act 1886
- Repealed by: Statute Law (Repeals) Act 2013

Status: Repealed

Text of statute as originally enacted

Uxbridge and Rickmansworth Railway Act 1896
- Act of Parliament
- Parliament of the United Kingdom
- Long title: An Act for incorporating the Uxbridge and Rickmansworth Railway Company and for other purposes.
- Citation: 59 & 60 Vict. c. x
- Territorial extent: United Kingdom

Dates
- Royal assent: 21 May 1896
- Commencement: 21 May 1896

Status: Current legislation

Text of statute as originally enacted

Uxbridge and Rickmansworth Railway Act 1899
- Act of Parliament
- Parliament of the United Kingdom
- Long title: An Act to authorise the Uxbridge and Rickmansworth Railway Company to abandon portions of their undertaking and to construct a new or substituted railway in lieu thereof and for other purposes.
- Citation: 62 & 63 Vict. c. cclxviii
- Territorial extent: United Kingdom

Dates
- Royal assent: 9 August 1899
- Commencement: 9 August 1899

Status: Current legislation

Text of statute as originally enacted

A plan was approved in the Uxbridge and Rickmansworth Railway Act 1861 (24 & 25 Vict. c. lxxiii) and the Uxbridge and Rickmansworth Railway Act 1862 (26 & 27 Vict. c. xxxvi)) to construct an extension of the Uxbridge Branch to create a link northwards to Watford Junction in Hertfordshire via Rickmansworth (Church Street), connecting it to the Watford and Rickmansworth Railway (W&RR). The scheme never went ahead as the GWR withdrew its funding.

Preceding station	Disused railways	Following station
Terminus	Great Western Railway; Uxbridge branch	Cowley; Line and station closed

== See also ==
- Uxbridge High Street railway station
- Uxbridge tube station
- List of closed railway stations in London
