= Ruislip Gardens tube station =

London Underground station

Ruislip Gardens
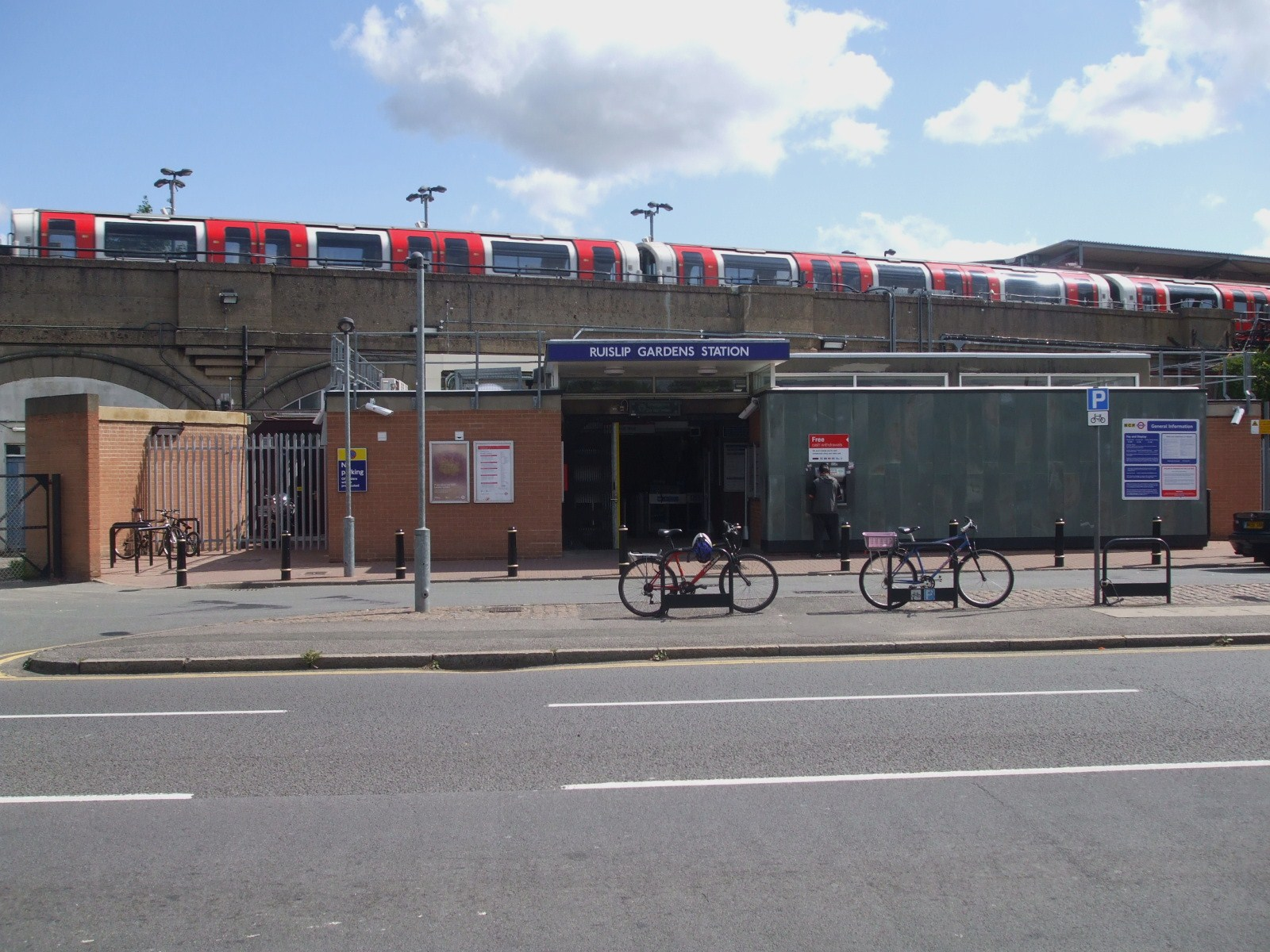
- Station entrance on West End Road
- Interactive map of Ruislip Gardens

General information
- Location: Ruislip
- Local authority: London Borough of Hillingdon
- Managed by: London Underground
- Number of platforms: 2
- Fare zone: 5

London Underground annual entry and exit
- 2020: ▼0.55 million
- 2021: ▼0.48 million
- 2022: ▲0.77 million
- 2023: ▲0.81 million
- 2024: ▲0.86 million

Key dates
- 2 April 1906: Tracks laid (GW&GCR)
- 9 July 1934: Opened (GW&GCR)
- 21 November 1948: Started (Central line)
- 21 July 1958: BR platforms closed

Other information
- External links: TfL station info page
- Coordinates: 51.5602°N 0.4102°W

Ruislip Gardens (/ˈraɪslɪp ˈɡɑːrdənz/) is a London Underground station. It is on the West Ruislip branch of the Central line, between West Ruislip and South Ruislip stations. It is in London fare zone 5.

== History ==
The tracks through the station were laid by part of the Great Western and Great Central Joint Railway with services starting on 2 April 1906 although there was no station at Ruislip Gardens at that time. The station opened on 9 July 1934.

As part of the 1935-40 New Works Programme, Central line services were projected westwards from a new junction, west of North Acton on the line to Ealing Broadway. The original intention was to extend the service as far as Denham, but work was delayed by World War II and the formation of the Metropolitan Green Belt after the war and so the terminus of the extension was cut back to West Ruislip, with services starting on 21 November 1948.

The main line services stopping at Ruislip Gardens ceased on 21 July 1958 and the station closed, leaving only the Central line services in place. Until recently the entrance to a passenger stairwell was visible on the London-bound side of the Chiltern tracks.

== Services ==
Ruislip Gardens station is on the West Ruislip branch of the Central line in London fare zone 5. It is between West Ruislip to the west and South Ruislip to the east.

Some services start or terminate here rather than West Ruislip, the trains leaving or entering the Central line depot to the west of the station, south of the running lines. There is a link from the Central line depot for stock movement to the Metropolitan line just to the west of Ruislip via a shunting neck.

The typical off-peak service in trains per hour is:

- 9 tph to West Ruislip (2023)
- 9 tph to Epping (2023)

Additional services call at the station during the peak hours, increasing the service to up to 12 tph in each direction.

Preceding station	London Underground	Following station
West Ruislip Terminus	Central line West Ruislip branch	South Ruislip towards Epping, Hainault or Woodford via Newbury Park
Disused railways
West Ruislip	Great Central Railway; Great Western and Great Central Joint Railway	South Ruislip
West Ruislip	Great Western Railway; New North Main Line	South Ruislip

== Connections ==
London Buses route E7 and school route 696 serve the station.
