= Uxbridge (Vine Street) branch line =

Railway line to Uxbridge (1856-1979)

The Uxbridge (Vine Street) branch line was a railway line to Uxbridge in the historical English county of Middlesex, from the Great Western Railway main line at West Drayton. It opened in 1856 as a broad gauge single line, 2 1/2 miles (4 km) long. It was converted to standard gauge in 1871. Two other branch lines were later built to Uxbridge, but without making a connection.

The passenger service was closed in 1962, and all traffic ceased in 1964 except for a stub at the West Drayton end, closed in 1979.

== Background ==
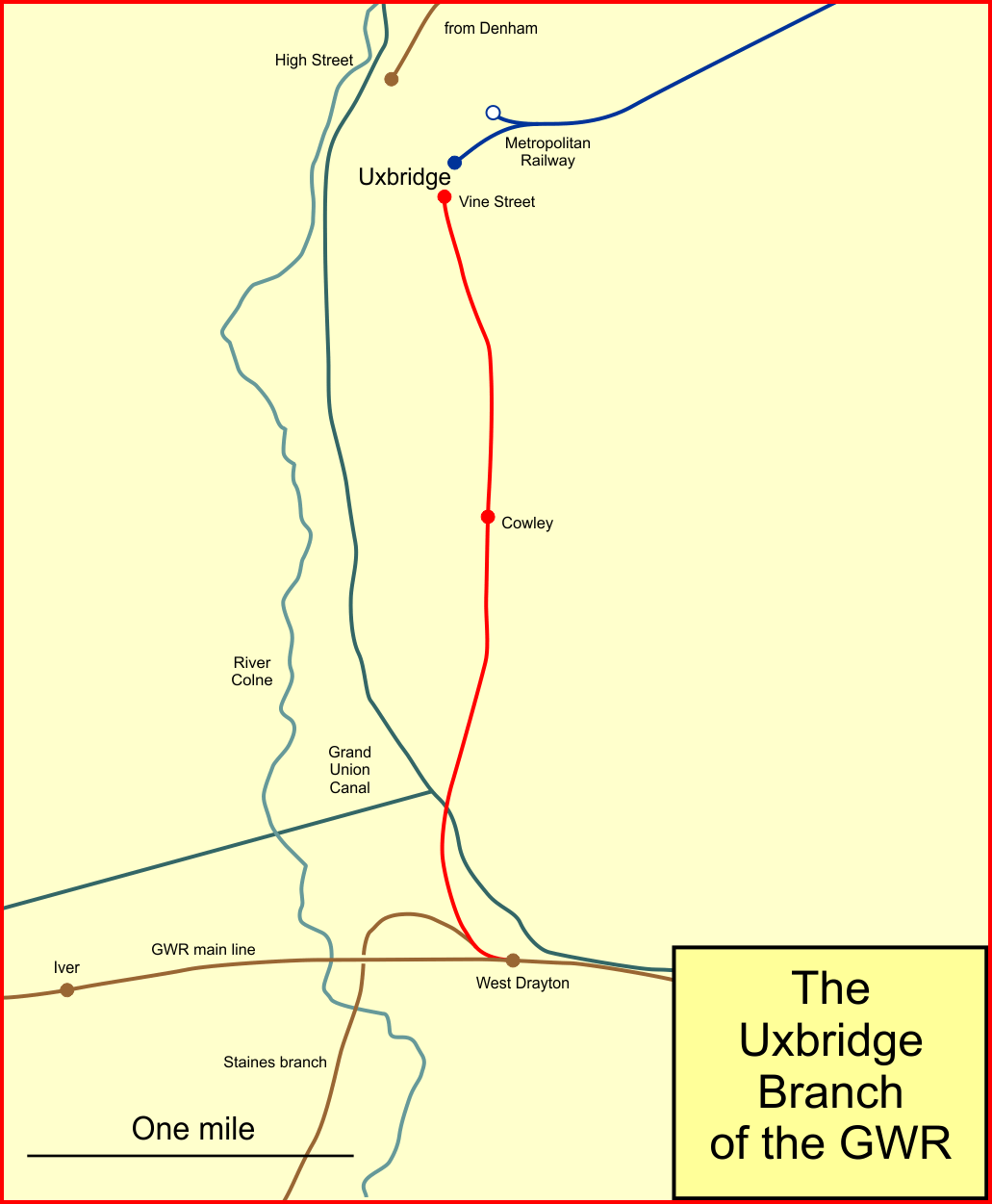
The Uxbridge branch after 1936

Uxbridge had enjoyed the benefit to its trade of a location on the London to Oxford coach route before the railway came. This led interests in the town to oppose the routing of railways through the town, and an 1829 proposed line to Birmingham (not actually built), and then the Great Western Railway main line were designed to avoid the town, and accordingly the GWR approached no closer than West Drayton, 2 1/2 miles (4 km) away. As well as the road transit, at the time West London could be reached by packet boat on the Paddington branch of the Grand Union Canal, recorded in the name Packet Boat Lane in Cowley Peachey.

The commercial disadvantage of not having a railway connection was soon apparent, and in the mid-1840s a branch line was promoted; it was the Great Western and Uxbridge Railway, authorised by an act of Parliament, the Great Western and Uxbridge Railway Act 1846 (9 & 10 Vict. c. clxvi) of 16 July 1846. However local investors were reluctant to support the scheme and it went no further for the time being.

== Real progress ==
The Great Western Railway was appealed to for help, and the following year, on 22 July 1847 the GWR obtained powers in the Great Western Railway (Amendments and Extensions) Act 1847 (10 & 11 Vict. c. ccxxvi) to take over the 1846 scheme itself. The branch line was to be short, but work did not proceed promptly, and it was not until powers for a deviation of the route near Uxbridge were obtained in the Great Western Railway Branches Act 1853 (16 & 17 Vict. c. cliii) that a start was made.

A single broad gauge line was opened on 8 September 1856 for passenger and goods traffic; the line was 2 miles 51 chains (4.2 km) in length, from a junction at West Drayton. The Uxbridge station was in Vine Street.

The initial train service had 15 trains each way and ten on Sundays. A through train to Paddington was started in 1876. By 1913 there were 45 trains daily, 16 on Sundays, including three to and from Liverpool Street and one to Victoria, until 1939.

== Early years ==
The GWR undertook the conversion of the gauge of its railway in the area in 1871 and the branch itself was closed from Friday 6 to Monday 9 October 1871; a road service to and from West Drayton was provided during the closure. In 1880 double track was installed.

The line left West Drayton station westward and curved immediately north; from its opening in 1885 the Staines branch (the Staines and West Drayton Railway) diverged and turned south from this point. The Uxbridge branch continued north, and had one intermediate station at Cowley, opened in 1904.

The Uxbridge station had an overall roof; it was demolished in 1933.

== Train services ==
Kirkland, writing in 1952, recorded that there were 35 passenger trains in each direction on the branch, of which 11 or 12 each way were through to Paddington. The local trips on the branch were worked by push and pull trains, mostly giving good connections at West Drayton. 61XX engines of the 2-6-2T type operated the through Paddington trains (from 1931).

Steam railmotors had been introduced from 1913, and partial dieselisation was introduced from September 1958, using GWR railcars.

== Metropolitan Railway ==
The area around Uxbridge became desirable for suburban development towards the end of the nineteenth century, and after some false starts, the Metropolitan Railway opened a branch line to a separate Uxbridge station. It opened on 1 July 1904, (Note: Kirkland; White says 4 July 1904.) and after an initial period of steam operation, was made an all-electric route. The station was in Belmont Road; as of 2017 the site was occupied by Sainsbury's supermarket. From 1933 tube trains of the Piccadilly line used the branch and station, but the station was inadequate, and in December 1938 the line was extended by a short distance to a new station in Uxbridge High Street.

== Northwards to Denham ==
The Acton and Wycombe Railway was authorised 1897, later forming a shortened route from Paddington towards High Wycombe; the route was later adopted and extended jointly by the Great Western Railway and the Great Central Railway, and is usually referred to as the GW and GC Joint Line. The GWR obtained authorisation in the Great Western Railway (General Powers) Act 1898 (61 & 62 Vict. c. clxxiv) to build a branch line from Denham on that line to Uxbridge Vine Street; a further act, the Great Western Railway Act 1899 (62 & 63 Vict. c. clxxxvii) of 1 August 1899 allowed a variation to the route. The connection to the Vine Street station would have run to the east of Oxford Road roundabout, but this final section was never built; the branch from Denham terminated at Uxbridge High Street. It opened on 1 May 1907, at first for passengers only. Some of the land for the connecting line was acquired, and in 1952 part of it could still be traced. The branch closed to passengers on 31 August 1939, fully closing on 2 April 1962.

== Road competition ==
From 1901 a street-running tramway service was operated from Uxbridge to Shepherd's Bush, and this made serious inroads into the business of the branch.

=== Closure ===
The line was closed to passengers on 10 September 1962, and replaced by the 224 bus. It was reduced to a single freight only track on 18 October 1962 and was closed to all traffic north of the Grand Union Canal on 13 July 1964. A short (approximately 745 yards) section from West Drayton Station to the Middlesex Oil and Chemical Works in Yiewsley continued in use until 8 January 1979. The section for freight access to the truncated Staines and West Drayton Railway to Colnbrook continues to be used.

== Current situation ==
=== The site today ===
The stretch of land alongside Brunel University where the track ran was sold by the local council upon the line's closure to the college as it was at the time, for £65,000. Otherwise a short piece of track at Cowley is one of the few remaining traces of the railway.

=== Proposed replacement ===
In response to proposals for enlargement of the London Ultra Low Emission Zone to the entirety of Greater London, a bi-partisan letter in November 2022 from the leader of the council and opposition of Hillingdon Council to the Mayor of London referenced poor cross-borough transport links and suggested an express bus service connecting Uxbridge to Elizabeth line stations at West Drayton and Hayes and Harlington.

== Topography ==
- West Drayton; GWR main line station; opened 4 June 1838; renamed West Drayton and Yiewsley 1895 to 1974; still open;
- Cowley; opened 1 October 1904; closed 10 September 1962;
- Uxbridge; opened 8 September 1856; renamed Uxbridge Vine Street 1907; closed 10 September 1962.
