= Denham, Buckinghamshire =

Village and civil parish in Buckinghamshire, England

Coordinates: 51.563°N 0.499°W

Denham
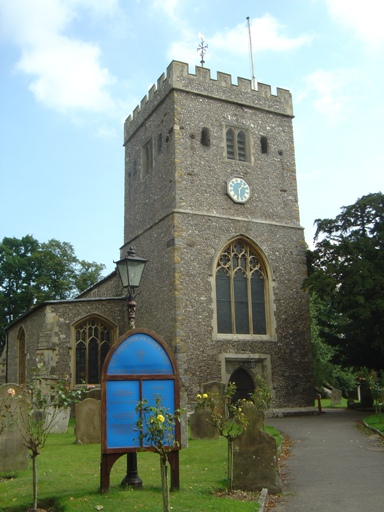
- St. Mary's Parish Church

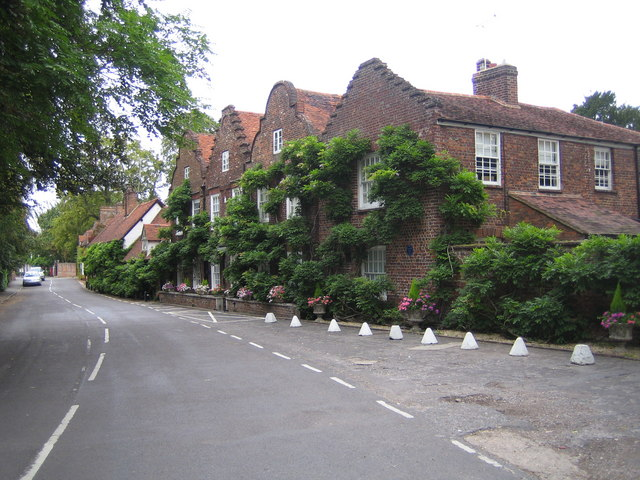
- Village Road is part of the architectural conservation area of Denham's nucleus.

- Location within Buckinghamshire
- Area: 16.02 km^{2} (6.19 sq mi)
- Population: 8,284
  - Density: 517/km^{2} (1,340/sq mi)
- OS grid reference: TQ0486
- Civil parish: Denham
- Unitary authority: Buckinghamshire
- Ceremonial county: Buckinghamshire
- Region: South East
- Country: England
- Sovereign state: United Kingdom
- Post town: Uxbridge
- Postcode district: UB9
- Dialling code: 01895
- Police: Thames Valley
- Fire: Buckinghamshire
- Ambulance: South Central
- UK Parliament: Beaconsfield

Denham is a village and civil parish in the unitary authority of Buckinghamshire, England, approximately 17 mi from central London, 2 mi northwest of Uxbridge and just north of junction 1 of the M40 motorway. The name is derived from the Old English for "homestead in a valley". It was listed in the Domesday Book of 1086 as Deneham. Denham contains the Buckinghamshire Golf Club.

== Buildings ==
The Church of England parish church of Saint Mary has a flint and stone Norman tower and Tudor monuments. The tree-lined Village Road includes several old red brick houses with mature Wisteria on them, and has been used as a location in British films and television.

Southlands Manor is a Grade II listed building. Its entry on the English Heritage website states that it was built in the 16th century, with a variety of later changes including the addition of four chimney stacks in the early 17th-century. Analysis of a sample of timbers from the main building and its associated barn have found that they were felled in the winters of 1472/3 and 1473/4, indicating that the relevant parts of the building were erected in 1474 or soon after.

The Old Bakery, built in about C14, it is one of the earliest surviving buildings along the village High Street. It is located along what would have been medieval burgage plots. The plots were for laying out a town. Built for the Abbot of Westminster, probably on instructions by Nicholas de Littlington, for his reeve. One survey suggests a very precise date of building of 1367–68, although no dendrochronology has been undertaken. The building phases and outlay are complex, with much alteration. Prior to the 1950s demolition of the former E wing the building formed three cottages/shops.

Denham Film Studios were near the village and where famous films, including Brief Encounter and In Which We Serve were produced. The buildings were demolished in 1980 and the site re-landscaped as a business park and later as a site for luxury homes.

Bosch has its UK head office in Denham.

== The "Denham Massacre" ==
In 1870 Denham received national attention in what became known as the "Denham Massacre". A local blacksmith, Emmanuel Marshall and six of his family, were found bludgeoned to death with a sledgehammer in their cottage in the village. A homeless man named John Owen, who claimed Marshall owned him money, was convicted of the murders and hanged at Aylesbury Gaol.

== Development ==
- Denham Village, the original settlement
- Denham Garden Village, north of Denham Green Lane – built in the 1950s, renovated in 2006
- Denham Green grew up around the shops beside the railway station. Alexander Korda's Denham Film Studios (now demolished) used the Broadwater (Business) Park land between the junction of the road to Rickmansworth (A412) and Moor Hall Road towards Harefield
- New Denham is a linear part on the old Oxford Road north-west of Uxbridge, west of the Grand Union Canal
- Higher Denham is a locality on the site of a World War I army training and transit camp, placed to take advantage of the adjacent Denham Golf Club station. After the war, the camp land was sold off piecemeal for housing, following a similar trend all over Metro-land. Martin-Baker, manufacturers of aircraft ejector seats, have a small factory in Higher Denham.
- Tatling End is on the Oxford Road, west of the junction with the A412, at the top of the hill leading out of the Misbourne valley
- Tilehouse Lane forms the western boundary of the old Tile House and grounds, which were constructed in 1800 and fell into dereliction in the mid 20th Century. The site was purchased by BP who built the Durdent Court residential training and conference centre there in 1983. BP subsequently sold the facility and it is now the Denham Grove Hotel.

== Transport ==
Denham railway station has direct services to London Marylebone and High Wycombe and limited services to Princes Risborough, Aylesbury and Banbury. Connecting services link to Birmingham Snow Hill, Stratford-upon-Avon and Kidderminster.

The 724 Green Line bus service links Harlow and Heathrow Airport—passing through St Albans, Watford, Rickmansworth, Denham and Uxbridge—and terminating at Heathrow Central bus station.

The 331 bus service between Uxbridge and Ruislip stations (operated by Metroline West for London Buses) calls at the Station Parade shops in Denham Green. The 581 circular bus service provides a link between the various areas of Denham and Uxbridge bus station. The Saturdays-only 582 service links the various Denhams with Iver, Slough and Windsor. The 101, 102 and 104 bus routes run through the outskirts of Denham.

Denham Aerodrome (ICAO: EGLD) is an operational general aviation aerodrome established in the early 1900s. Sited on higher land to the north of the village, it is the base of many private and executive aircraft and helicopters with several hangars and a hard runway. In 1915, during the First World War, RAF Denham was established as a flying training school for flight cadets.

== Schools ==
Denham Village School (formerly Denham Village Infant School, which originally had classes for Reception and Years 1 and 2), in Cheapside Lane, is the original school for Denham, and now has classes from Reception to Year 6. The school building dates from 1832 and is Grade II listed.

Denham Green E-ACT Primary Academy is located on Nightingale Way and opened in September 2013. Replacing the former Tilehouse Combined School, it is for children ages 4–11, and offers pre-school services. The school's current leadership team completed an Ofsted inspection shortly before converting to an academy. Ofsted noted that the school was a Good school with Outstanding features. The academy accepts all children from the Denham area (including Denham Village, Denham Green, Maple Cross, Harefield and North Uxbridge) who wish to attend the school.

== Sports ==
- Denham contains the Buckinghamshire Golf Club and the Denham Golf Club.
- Denham Cricket Club, on Cheapside Lane, currently play in Morrant's Chiltern Cricket League.
- Denham United Football Club, on Tilehouse Lane, play in the High Wycombe Sunday Football Combination Division 1.

== Demography ==
2011 Published statistics: population, home ownership and extracts from physical environment, surveyed in 2005
Output area	Homes owned outright	Owned with a loan	Socially rented	Privately rented	Other	km^{2} roads	km^{2} water	km^{2} domestic gardens	km^{2} domestic buildings	km^{2} non-domestic buildings	Usual residents	km^{2}
Civil parish	1125	1039	463	357	37	0.761	0.391	1.416	0.250	0.175	7139	16.02

== Notable residents ==
- Raymond Baxter, BBC Television presenter, lived in Denham until 1978.
- Mary Hayley Bell, English actress and writer, married to Sir John Mills, lived in Denham from 1975 until her death in 2005.
- Cilla Black, singer, entertainer and television personality had her main residence in Denham Green, bought with her late husband Bobby in the 1970s. In a burglary in 2002 £1 million worth of gems were stolen.
- Sir George Bowyer, 5th Baronet, was born at Denham Court.
- Brian Connolly, lead singer with 1970s glam rock band Sweet, lived at Denham until his death in 1997.
- Jess Conrad, actor and singer, lived in Denham.
- Edward Cooke, British politician and pamphleteer, was born in Denham.
- Dame Isobel Cripps, overseas aid organiser, was born in Denham.
- Paul Daniels, magician, lived in Denham.
- Lt-Gen. Gerald Goodlake VC, British soldier and recipient of the Victoria Cross, lived and died at Savay Farm, close to Denham.
- Sir John Mills, film actor, was a resident of the village for many years, and is commemorated by a blue plaque on Hills House, his former residence by the church.
- Sir Roger Moore, actor, lived in Sherwood House, Tilehouse Road, Denham.
- Oswald Mosley, British politician and founder of the British Union of Fascists, lived at nearby Savay Farm with his wife, Diana Mosley.
- Mike Oldfield, musician, lived in Tilehouse Lane, Denham, 1979–86.
- Harry Saltzman, Canadian-born Hollywood producer who produced the James Bond films in the 1960s, lived most of his life in Denham.
- Norman Spencer, film producer, lived in Denham in his later life.
- Robert Vansittart, 1st Baron Vansittart, senior British diplomat and Chief Diplomatic Adviser to the British Government in the 1920s and 1930s, lived in Denham Place until his death in 1957.
- Dennis Wise, former Wimbledon, Chelsea and England football player and manager, lives in Denham.

== Twinning ==
Twinned with Denham, Shark Bay, Western Australia
