= Hampstead Junction Railway =

Railway line in London, England

The Hampstead Junction Railway was a railway line in north-west London, England, opened in 1860. It connected the existing North London Railway at Camden with the North and South Western Junction Railway at Willesden. It ran through open country but encouraged residential building, providing passenger train connections with the City of London, as well as connecting other lines. It was absorbed by the North London Railway in 1867. Its route remains in use today with the passenger trains of the North London Line as well as heavy freight traffic.

== Origins ==
Hampstead Junction Railway Act 1853
- Act of Parliament
- Parliament of the United Kingdom
- Long title: An Act for making a Railway from the London and North-western Railway at Willesden to the North London Railway, with a Branch to the North and South Western Junction Railway, to be called "The Hampstead Junction Railway," and for other Purposes.
- Citation: 16 & 17 Vict. c. ccxxii

Dates
- Royal assent: 20 August 1853

Text of statute as originally enacted

The Hampstead Junction Railway was incorporated by an act of Parliament, the Hampstead Junction Railway Act 1853 (16 & 17 Vict. c. ccxxii), on 20 August 1853 to build a line from Willesden, on the London and North Western Railway (LNWR), to the North London Railway (NLR) at Camden, with a branch to the North and South Western Junction Railway (N&SWJR) at Old Oak Junction.

It "was intended principally to enable local passenger traffic on the North London railway to extend west to Kew and Richmond without the need to pass through Camden station and Primrose Hill Tunnel, where enormous traffic on the London and North Western's main line presented a serious obstacle to the running of local passenger trains at frequent intervals".

The North London Railway ran from Poplar, in east London, westward across north London through Canonbury and Camden, to join the London and North Western Railway at Willesden, which lacked a station at the time. As well as connecting with the London docks, the NLR had a connection to Fenchurch Street station in the City of London.

To the west, the North and South Western Junction Railway had opened, diverging southwards from the LNWR main line at Willesden to Kew, where it connected with the London and South Western Railway (LSWR). This gave it access (over the LSWR) to the important town of Richmond.

Residential travel to places of business in the City of London was increasing considerably, and goods and mineral traffic from the docks and manufacturing areas in East London to the western suburbs was also growing. The Hampstead Junction line provided relief to the LNWR main line, connecting the North London Railway and the N&SWJR.

== Opening ==
The line was opened on 2 January 1860, and was worked by the North London Railway.

From 1864 it was managed by the North London Railway, and absorbed by the LNWR in 1867.

== Route ==
The Hampstead Junction Railway diverged northwards from the North London Railway following Camden Town station (renamed Camden Road in 1950) at Camden Road Junction towards Willesden. In 1867, Kentish Town station (renamed Kentish Town West in 1924) was opened at the crossing with Prince of Wales Road. The line continued to Gospel Oak station (named Kentish Town until 1867) and Hampstead Heath station, before heading through the 1166-yard long Hampstead Tunnel. The railway then served Finchley Road St Johns Wood station (renamed Finchley Road & Frognal in 1880) before crossing the Midland Railway main line to West End Lane station (renamed West Hampstead in 1975) and Edgeware Road (Kilburn) station (renamed several times, finally as Brondesbury in 1883).

The line continued to Brondesbury Park station, which opened later in 1908, followed by Kensal Green & Harlesden station, which was replaced in 1873 by Kensal Green station (renamed Kensal Rise in 1890). The earlier 1861 station had staggered platforms, so that stopping trains passed under Green Lane (later Wrottesley Road) before the platform was reached. Following this station, there was a three-way diverging junction, with the two outer routes leading to the London North Western Railway (LNWR) main line, and the centre route crossing over the LNWR main line and joining the North and South Western Junction Railway at Old Oak Junction. A high-level platform was later built over the LNWR to serve Willesden Junction station in 1969.

Gradients on the line rise from each end to a high point in Hampstead Tunnel, the westbound gradient being at a steep gradient of 1 in 98.

The North London line was electrified at 600 V DC using the four rail system on 1 October 1916; with trains running from Broad Street to Richmond and Kew Bridge. The four rail electrification was altered to a three-rail system in August 1970.

In 1996, the line was closed for major upgrade work in connection with the construction of the Channel Tunnel Rail Link, involving substantial alterations and the strengthening of the Hampstead Tunnel. The line was reopened on 29 September 1996, and the electrification system was changed to 25 kV AC overhead as part of the work.
