= Brondesbury =

Area of the London Borough of Brent, England

Coordinates: 51.54567°N 0.20597°W

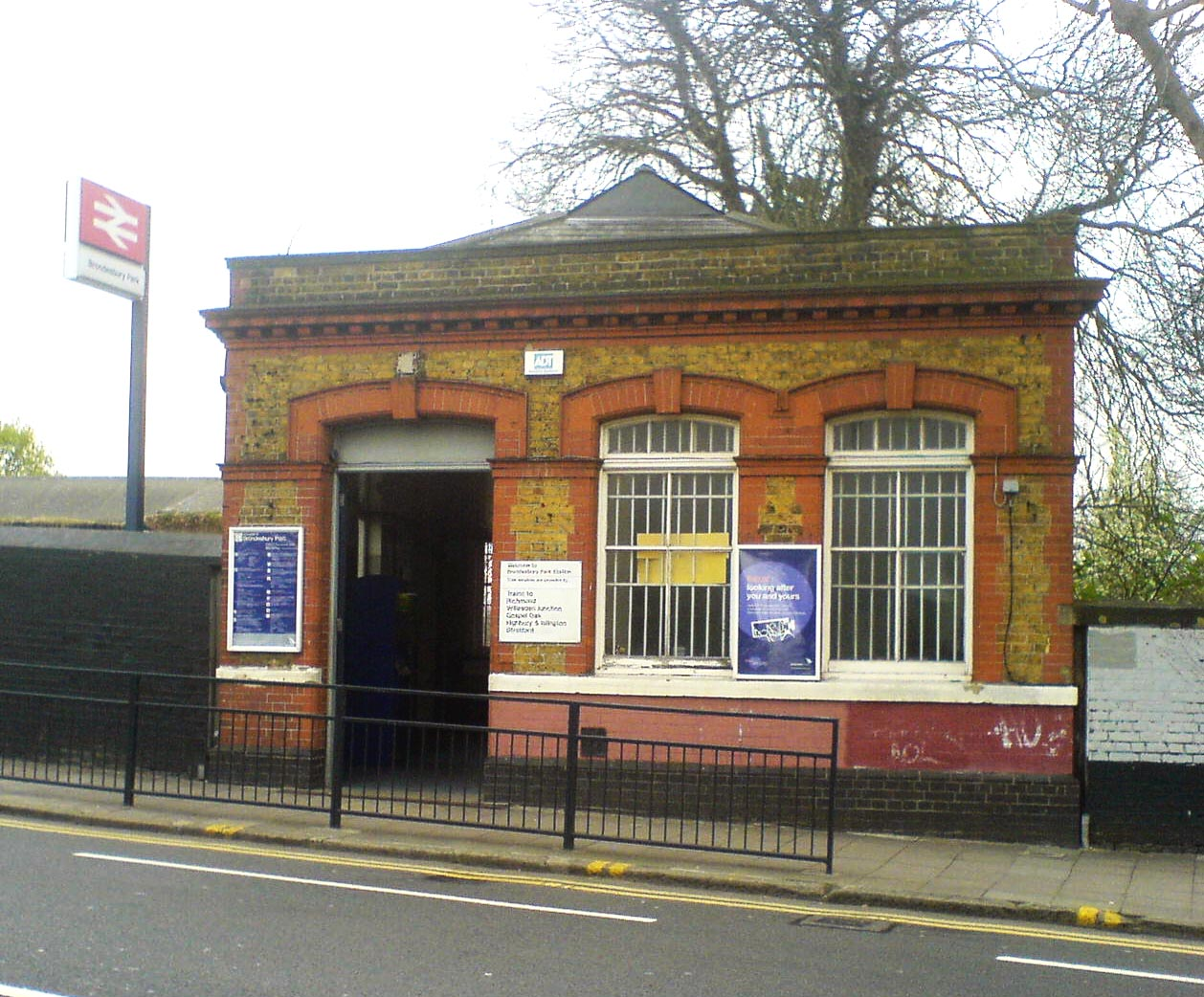
- One of the small station buildings of Brondesbury Park Station, higher than the line which is in a cutting. It has small cornices at the hood of window height and a modillioned bulky cornice (ledge) above. It has a built in yellow-brown brick with complementary coloured red brick dressings.

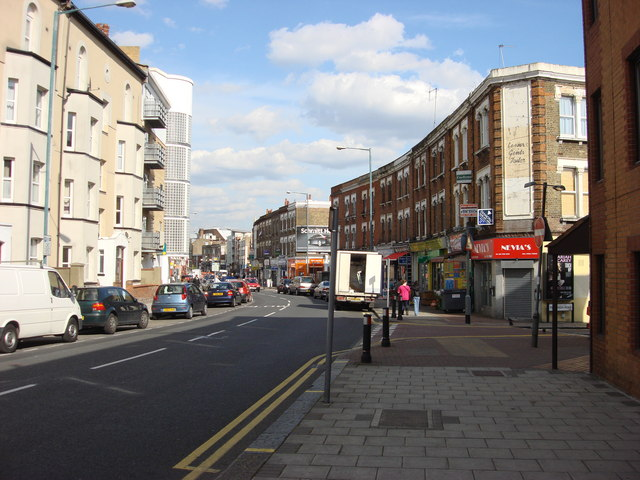
- Willesden Lane in Brondesbury

- Location within Greater London
- Population: 13,023 (Brondesbury & Brondesbury Park)
- OS grid reference: TQ245845
- London borough: Brent; Camden
- Ceremonial county: Greater London
- Region: London
- Country: England
- Sovereign state: United Kingdom
- Post town: LONDON
- Postcode district: NW6
- Dialling code: 020
- Police: Metropolitan
- Fire: London
- Ambulance: London
- UK Parliament: Hampstead and Highgate
- London Assembly: Brent and Harrow; Barnet and Camden

Brondesbury (/ˈbrɒndzbəri/), which includes Brondesbury Park, is an area in the London Boroughs of Brent and Camden, in north London, England. The area is traditionally part of the ancient parish and subsequent municipal borough of Willesden, one of the areas that merged to form the modern borough of Brent.

Brondesbury railway station lies 4.1 miles north-west of Charing Cross, and its proximity to the originally Roman A5 road (the borough's eastern boundary) sometimes leads to addresses on the eastern, Camden, side of the road to also be informally described as part of Brondesbury.

It was a rural area until several decades after the coming of the railway in the Victorian era. Housing began to be built in earnest across Brondesbury in the late 1860s to 1890s and it became desirable enough to retain a suburban layout and most of the associated original wave of house building. It has long had British, Irish, Jewish, black and South Asian communities. Brondesbury was once the location of residence for Black civil rights leader Billy Strachan and his family, who wrote for local newspapers gave weekly political speeches in the area.

== Transport ==
=== Rail/Underground ===
Brondesbury has two railway stations served by London Overground's North London Line between Richmond, Clapham Junction and Stratford.

- Brondesbury Station
- Brondesbury Park Station

Kilburn tube station on the Jubilee line is about 200 m north from Brondesbury station on Kilburn High Road.

== Demography ==
=== Economic activity groups ===
Half of the area is Brondesbury Park ward, details of which are below:

Status	Ward %	Borough %	National %
Economically Active	78.0	74.3	76.8
Retired	2.5	2.6	4.9
Student	7.9	9.2	6.6
Looking After Home Or Family	4.8	5.9	4.9
Long-Term Sick Or Disabled	4.0	4.0	4.6
Other inactive	2.9	4.0	2.3

Narrowly, most of the other half forms the north of Kilburn electoral ward, equivalent details of which are below:

Status	Ward %	Borough %	National %
Economically Active	77.5	74.3	76.8
Retired	2.1	2.6	4.9
Student	7.4	9.2	6.6
Looking After Home Or Family	4.7	5.9	4.9
Long-Term Sick Or Disabled	4.9	4.0	4.6
Other inactive	3.6	4.0	2.3

Currently as the electoral wards are drawn about 20% of the area is in Queens Park ward. Its relevant statistics are as follows:

Status	Ward %	Borough %	National %
Economically Active	81.4	74.3	76.8
Retired	2.0	2.6	4.9
Student	6.3	9.2	6.6
Looking After Home Or Family	4.0	5.9	4.9
Long-Term Sick Or Disabled	3.4	4.0	4.6
Other inactive	3.0	4.0	2.3

== History ==
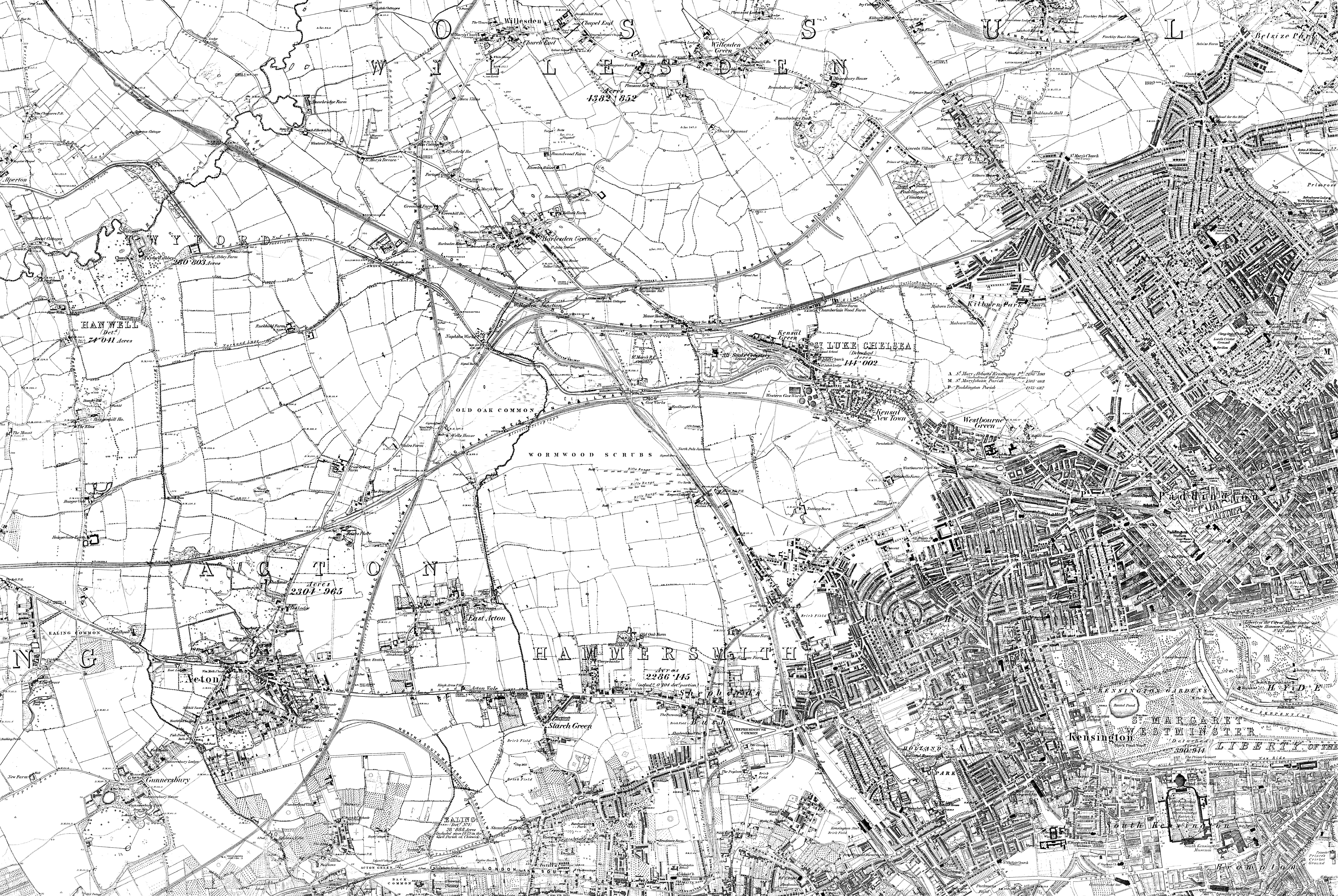
Extract of OS Map of 1868-1883. Click on map to view wider sheet.

=== Manor and manor house ===
Willesden parish, which included Durand's estate at Twyford and Harlesden manor, was divided between eight variable, ecclesiastical prebends: East Twyford in the south-west, Neasden in the north-west, Oxgate in the northeast, Harlesden in the centre and south, and Chambers, Brondesbury, Bounds, and Mapesbury in the east.

The manor Brondesbury, Brands or Broomsbury almost certainly derived its name from Brand (seen in documents of about 1192 and 1215), sometimes confused with Brownswood in Hornsey of Roger Brun listed as prebendary of Brondesbury. The estate was held by the prebendaries until it was vested in the Ecclesiastical Commissioners in 1840 under the Act of that year. In 1649 the parliamentary commissioners sold it to Ralph Marsh but it reverted at the Restoration (1660). The leasehold interest of Brondesbury was bought with what remained too of Bounds manor in 1856 and the Ecclesiastical Commissioners retained the freehold until the 1950s and 1960s.

Forty-year leases were made of Brondesbury to William Peter, gentleman of London, in 1538 and to Thomas Young, a Willesden yeoman, in reversion in 1566. In the first decade of the 17th century Young's widow and his daughter lived here. In 1615 the latter, Christian's estranged husband, Henry Shugborow, brought an action for possession against the executors, who had re-entered because the rent had not been paid and it had been sublet to one Marsh, 'an ancient tenant'. The estate was leased for lives in 1638 to Edward Roberts but Ralph Marsh, who in 1649 bought Brondesbury from the parliamentary commissioners, seems to have occupied the land. Thomas and Ralph Marsh were described as "of Brands" in 1679 and 1694 respectively. Ralph Marsh (d. 1709) in 1708 received a lease for lives. The estate was heavily mortgaged by the Marshes from 1725 and in 1749 Ralph Marsh sold the lease to John Stace, who obtained a new lease in 1757. Stace sold the lease in 1765 to Joseph Gibson, the undertenant, who obtained a new lease in 1769 and whose widow and son tried to sell the estate in 1778. In 1788 Lady (Sarah) Salusbury purchased the leasehold, and in 1799 she obtained a new lease for lives. Brondesbury thereafter passed through the same ownership as Bounds, Lady Salusbury obtaining possession (all other competing leases rendered inferior) in 1842.

A moated house as the manor house existed by 1538. It was described in 1649, probably with the remnants of the moat, and was depicted in 1749 as a large, apparently L-shaped building with a central cupola. It appears to have been rebuilt in the third quarter of the 18th century and by the time of Lady (Sarah) Salusbury was a three-storeyed villa with a central canted entrance bay rising the full height of the north front. A lower wing, presumably an addition, ran southward from the east end. In 1789 Humphry Repton landscaped roughly 10-acre (4.0 ha) of demesne grounds and William Wilkins supplied drawings for a Gothic seat. In his 'Red Book' Repton commented favourably on the hilltop site and enhanced the view towards London. The house and 23 acres, increased by 1834 to 53 acres, was occupied by Sir Coutts Trotter, Bt. (1804–36), Lady Trotter (1836–40), Lady (Elizabeth) Salusbury (1840–3), and Charles Hambro (1843–9). The house was extended westward and a semicircular bay was added to the south front in the early 19th century. By 1849 the demesne fell to 27 acres and the house, described in 1816 as being commodious yet having 'no regularity of architectural character' and in 1822 as an 'elegant seat', three-storeyed. It continued as a gentleman's residence under Mrs. Howard (1850–3), Henry Vallence (1853–6), Mrs. Geach (1856–61), John Coverdale (1862–7), and Thomas Brandon (1867–76), and in 1877 was offered for sale with 52 acres. After remaining empty it was leased as a school, to Margaret Clark (1882–98) and Lucy Soulsby (1898–1915). In 1891 the school added a classroom and dormitory block on the east and later a chapel beyond that. The house continued as a school until 1934 when, described as 'shabby-looking', it was bought by C. W. B. Simmonds, a builder, and was pulled down to make way for Manor Drive.

The Imperial Gazetteer of 1870-72 reads:

Brondesbury, a chapelry in Willesden parish, Middlesex; formed in 1866. Pop., 400. Living, a rectory.

=== First place of worship ===
Christ Church, Willesden Lane, Brondesbury. Dist[rict] formed 1867 from St. Mary's under Dr. Charles W. Williams (d. 1889) and financed by his sisters. Declared a rectory...1868. Williams, patron and first rector, succeeded by son, Charles D. Williams 1889-1913. Patronage sold to parish c. 1930 and transferred to Lord Chancellor c. 1957. United with St. Lawrence's 1971. One asst. curate by 1896, two by 1926. High Church. Attendance 1903: 300 a.m.; 447 p.m [Sundays]. Limestone...in 13th century style by C. R. B. King: chancel, north tower and spire, nave, N. aisle, N. transept, and NW. porch 1866, S. aisle and S. transept 1899, choir vestry 1909. Damaged by land mine 1940, restored 1948. Missions: St. Lawrence (q.v.); Poplars Ave. c. 1918; Avenue Close 1903-39.

=== Later places of worship ===
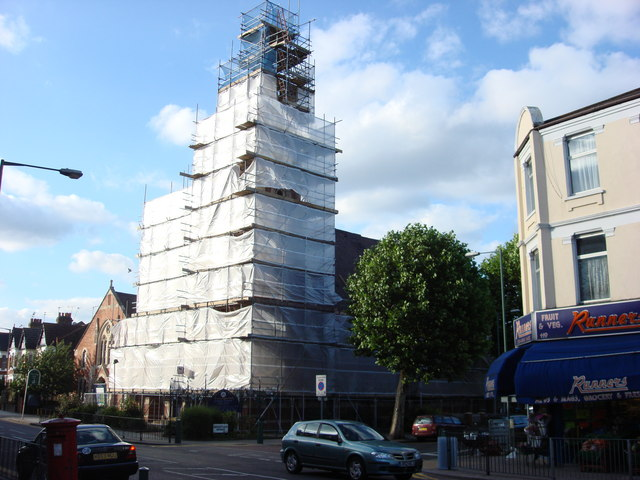
Church of the Transfiguration, Brondesbury Park, itself in a state of transfiguration

The Catholic church has the Church of the Transfiguration where the district traditionally is considered Kensal Rise.

A late 20th century addition is the Christ Apostolic Church (Mount Joy) which is an Aladura church, the major family of churches in western Nigeria.

== In art, literature, film and the media ==
Giles, Giles & Fripp, the forerunner to the band King Crimson, at its most successful in 1969–1974, named an album The Brondesbury Tapes.
