= Queen's Park, London =

Suburb of London

Coordinates: 51.5338°N 0.2026°W

Queen's Park
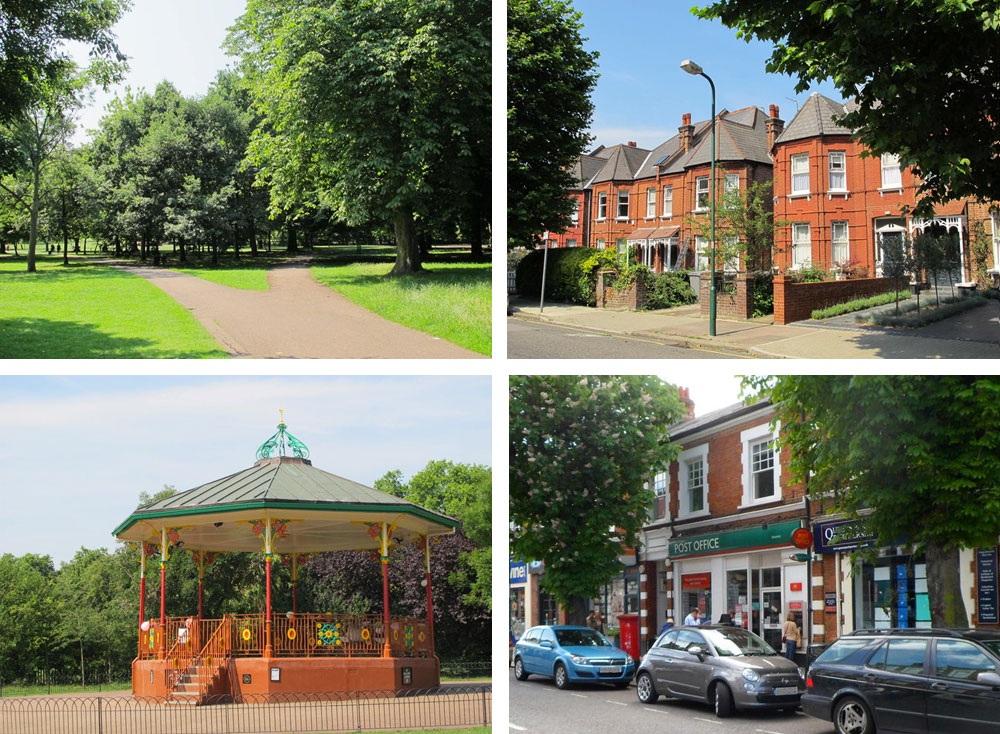
- From top left to bottom right: The northern entrance to Queen's Park; Victorian houses on Chevening Road; The bandstand in Queen's Park; Queen's Park Post Office on Salusbury Road

- Location within Greater London
- Population: 12,372 (2018 Census. Westminster CC)
- OS grid reference: TQ246832
  - Charing Cross: 4 mi (6.4 km) SE
- Civil parish: Queen's Park (Note: The civil parish of Queen's Park coincides with the Queen's Park electoral ward of the City of Westminster)
- London borough: Brent; Westminster
- Ceremonial county: Greater London
- Region: London
- Country: England
- Sovereign state: United Kingdom
- Post town: LONDON
- Postcode district: NW6, NW10
- Postcode district: W9, W10
- Dialling code: 020
- Police: Metropolitan
- Fire: London
- Ambulance: London
- UK Parliament: Queen's Park and Maida Vale
- London Assembly: Brent and Harrow; West Central

Queen's Park is an area located mostly in the London Borough of Brent, and partially in the City of Westminster. An area within Westminster forms the civil parish of Queen's Park, (Note: The civil parish of Queen's Park coincides with the Queen's Park electoral ward of the City of Westminster) the first to be created in London since the right of communities to establish civil parishes was enacted in 2007. The area is located 4 miles (6.4 km) north-west of Charing Cross, and centred around a 30 acres (12 ha) park, which opened in 1887 and was named in honour of Queen Victoria. The area gives its name to Queens Park Rangers football club.

The north of Queen's Park (in the London Borough of Brent) is an area of Brondesbury Park, and one of its open spaces. The south is in the London borough of the City of Westminster. Kilburn Lane delineates the boundary between the boroughs, as well as of the Queen's Park electoral wards for the two boroughs.

Architecturally, Queen's Park is an important historic area, with a unified urban layout with a high level of building preservation. The park is a good example of a Victorian urban green space, and the surrounding streets largely comprise original two- and three-storey Victorian buildings.

== Governance ==
Queen's Park civil parish in the City of Westminster

The Queens Park ward of the Metropolitan Borough of Paddington. Paddington merged into the City of Westminster in 1965.

=== Background ===
Queen's Park straddled the ancient parishes of Willesden (the northern part, in the London Borough of Brent) and Chelsea (the southern part, in the City of Westminster).

The Queens Park Estate was developed in 1875–81, in Kensal Town which had been an exclave of Chelsea from before the time of the Norman Conquest. In 1900 the exclave was removed from Chelsea and divided between its neighbours, with most of it, the area north of the Grand Union Canal, and including the Queens Park Estate joining with the area of the ancient parish of Paddington to form the new Metropolitan Borough of Paddington.

The park was laid out in the parish of Willesden in 1886. In 1874 the parish of Willesden adopted the Local Government Act 1858 and a local board was formed.

In 1965, Paddington merged with Westminster and Marylebone to form the City of Westminster, while Willesden became part of the new London Borough of Brent.

=== Electoral wards ===
The area gives its name to two electoral wards in adjacent London boroughs. The area north of Kilburn Lane is the Queens Park ward of the London Borough of Brent and the area south of Kilburn Lane is the Queen's Park ward of the City of Westminster. Both wards return three councillors to their respective councils, all Labour as of the 2022 local elections.

Both wards fall within the Queen's Park and Maida Vale parliamentary constituency, represented by Labour MP Georgia Gould.

=== Queen's Park Community Council ===
In May 2012, residents of the Westminster ward voted in favour of the establishment of a Queen's Park civil parish and parish council.

In June 2012, Westminster City Council approved the establishment of Queen's Park Community Council from 1 April 2014 as the first parish council created in London since new legislation was enacted in 2007. The community council area is coterminous with the City of Westminster ward of Queen's Park.

The first election of councillors to the community council took place in May 2014 at the same time as other local elections. Subsequent elections are held every four years at the same time as elections to the city council, with the most recent being on 5 May 2022. Parish councils have no statutory responsibilities, but have a budget they can direct towards community projects.

=== Queen's Park Neighbourhood Plan ===
In November 2021, the City Council formally adopted the Queen's Park Neighbourhood Plan. It is therefore now part of the statutory Development Plan for Westminster and will be used alongside the council’s own planning documents and the Mayor’s London Plan in determining applications in the Queen's Park Neighbourhood Area.

== History ==
=== 19th century ===
The Queens Park Estate was developed between 1875 and 1881, in what is now the City of Westminster, by the Artizans, Labourers & General Dwellings Company, and named in honour of Queen Victoria. The park, which shares the name, lies a short distance north of the estate in the London Borough of Brent. It was laid out in 1886 by the City of London, and opened the following year.

In 1879, the Royal Agricultural Society annual show was held on the area which would become Queen's Park. The 100 acres (40 ha) site was chosen for its proximity to the railway network, Queen's Park Station having opened on 2 June 1879 on the main line from London to Birmingham, just in time to facilitate the movement of heavy machinery and stock. By the 1870s the annual shows had become major events and the Kilburn show was to be the largest ever held. The show was opened on 30 June 1879 by the Prince and Princess of Wales and saw an entry of 11,878 implements, 2,879 livestock entries and over 187,000 visitors. Poor weather and deep mud led to low attendance, but a visit by Queen Victoria on the fifth day, where she was driven on a specially constructed drive of ballast and brick from the new station along Salusbury Road on a route lined with cheering crowds, rallied visitors.

In 1884, the North West London Park League was formed to secure the site as a people's park. The league appealed to the Ecclesiastical Commissioners not to sell the land for building until the future of the site could be assured as a public open space. In 1885 the Estates Committee of the commissioners agreed to offer the use of the central portion of the land of 30 acres (12 ha) for public use and that the remaining portion of the site would be laid out as housing to derive the most benefit from the frontage onto the proposed park. The offer was to be made through the Lord Mayor to the City of London Corporation, conditional on sanction by Parliament. On 5 September 1887 Queen's Park officially opened with several thousand people present.

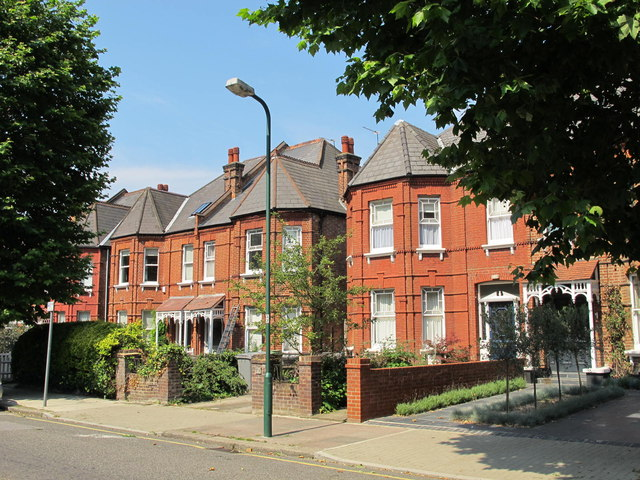
Victorian houses on Chevening Road in Queen's Park, built around 1899.

The houses around Queen's Park were erected over a number of years starting with the north side of Harvist Road of which the majority were completed by 1899. The west side of Chevening Road was also under construction in 1899 by local builders Bennet and Gimbrett to the design of G. A. Sexton. Many builders contributed to the estate which helped to generate the varied architectural character that can be seen on Kempe, Keslake and Chamberlayne Roads.

The football team Queens Park Rangers was formed when a local boys' team, founded by the vicar of the nearby St John's Church, merged with Christ Church Rangers and took their name from the area. They went on to become a professional team in 1889. In July 2011 a plaque commemorating the event was unveiled by former star Stan Bowles on St Jude's Institute on Ilbert Street.

=== 20th century ===
In 1915, the Bakerloo Line was extended to Queen's Park station, the nearby Kensal Green station appearing in 1916. Both stations offer easy access to Paddington, Charing Cross and Waterloo mainline stations.

In 1917, Queens Park Rangers moved away from the area to the Loftus Road stadium in nearby Shepherd's Bush.

In summer 1979, The Jam recorded their music video When You're Young in Queen's Park, making use of the bandstand.

In 1986, Brent Council with the support of English Heritage made the area around Queen's Park a Conservation Area in recognition of its special architectural and historic character. Subsequently, in 1993 the designated area was extended westwards towards Chamberlayne Road.

== Geography ==
=== Neighbouring areas ===
Neighbouring areas include Kensal Town to the south, Kensal Green to the west, Willesden to the north and Kilburn and Maida Vale to the east. There is a degree of overlap in perceptions of the extent of these areas.

=== The park ===
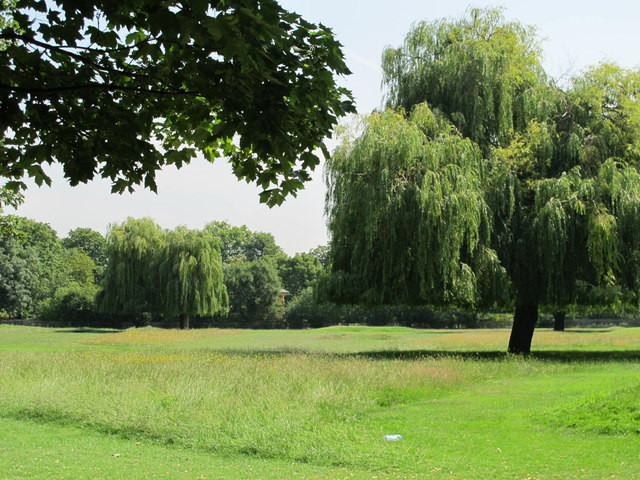
The northwest part of Queen's Park

The park was laid out by Alexander McKenzie between March 1887 and June 1887. McKenzie was a leading figure in Victorian park design, part of an influential group of landscape designers which included Robert Marnock, Joseph Meston and William Robinson who led garden design away from the parterres and geometry of earlier Victorian gardens to a more natural style of gardening.

Designed without any straight paths, Queen's Park makes extensive use of bold tree planting and shrubberies with natural outlines, and large open areas of lawn for recreation and sport.

Facilities in the park include six all-weather tennis courts, a pitch-and-putt course, an ornamental quiet garden, a children's playground with paddling pool, a children's animal farm and a café.

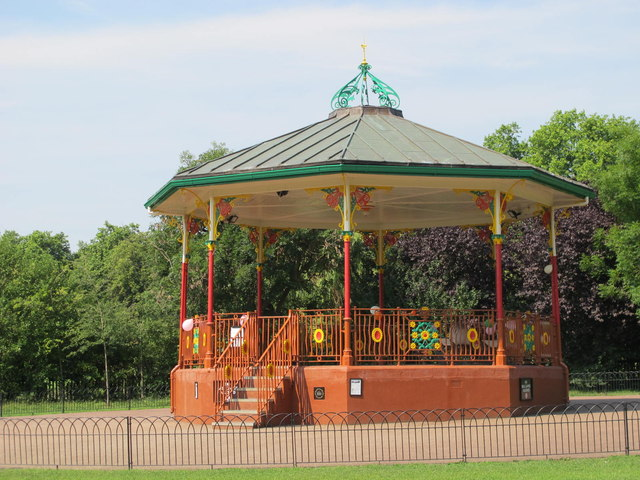
The bandstand in Queen's Park

A landmark in the park is the bandstand, which was completed in 1887 using ironwork supplied by Walter Fariane & Co. of Glasgow, and a timber roof with wrought-iron scrolled devices to each facet, and a central wrought- iron lantern. The bandstand was Grade-II listed in 2000.

The park is managed by the City of London Corporation. In 2020 it won Green Flag status for the 24th year in a row, and an additional Green Heritage Site award for its care and conservation of open space and facilities.

The City of London focuses on sustainable management, recycling as much waste as possible. Grass clippings and wood are used to make mulch for shrubberies; everyday waste like cans, bottles and plastics are separated and recycled. Residents bring in their Christmas trees, which are mulched and return for use on their own gardens. Rain water is recycled via a new drainage system. All water runs into a holding tank underground and can be pumped to various areas when needed.

Queen's Park has a range of places of worship:

- St Anne with Holy Trinity, Brondesbury (Church of England)
- St Luke's Church, West Kilburn, Fernhead Road (Church of England)
- St John the Evangelist, Kensal Green, Kilburn Lane (Church of England)
- Church of The Transfiguration (Roman Catholic)
- West Kilburn Baptist Church
- Brondesbury United Synagogue
- Imam Khoei Islamic Centre
- Harrow Road Jamme Mosque, Lancefield Street
- Kingdom Hall of Jehovah's Witnesses, Third Avenue

== Culture ==
The local community host two annual festivals at Queen's Park.

- Queen's Park Day in September brings together a funfair, stalls for local community groups and shops, various entertainments (including acrobats and bird of prey displays) and live music hosted by the Rhythm Studio who foster young bands and singers in the Queens Park area.
- The Queen's Park Book Festival, in June, mixes national and international writers with local writing groups as part of the growing book festival movement across England.

== Economy ==
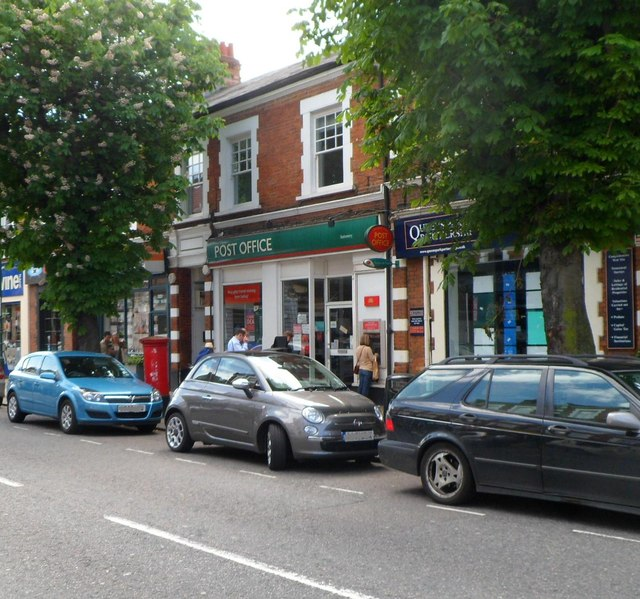
The Post Office on Salusbury Road

The economic centre of Queen's Park is Salusbury Road, where there are many shops, pubs, cafes and restaurants.

The weekly Queen's Park Farmers' Market has around 40 stalls and takes place every Sunday between 10am and 2pm in the grounds of Salusbury Primary School on Salusbury Road. The market was awarded market of the year at the Farmers’ Market and Retail Association Local Food Awards in 2012.

AMC Networks opened a 25,000 square feet (2,300 m^{2}) UK headquarters office housing 200 employees on Salusbury Road in 2017. It closed in 2022 and was replaced with a Jobcentre Plus.

== Education ==
The area has several schools:

- Salusbury Primary School
- Ark Franklin Primary academy
- Islamia Primary School, established in 1983 by Yusuf Islam, a voluntary-aided Islamic faith school that educates around 390 pupils aged 4 to 11.
- Al-Sadiq and Al-Zahara Schools
- Queen's Park Primary School in Droop Street is also home to the Westminster Children's University.
- Princess Frederica C of E Primary school
- St Luke's CE Primary School, Fernhead Road
- The St Marylebone CE Bridge School, Herries Street
- Wilberforce Primary School, Beethoven Street.
- Hopscotch Under 5's
- Kenmont Primary school

== Transport ==
Queen's Park station is a tube and Network Rail station in London fare zone 2; it has direct links to south and central London via the Bakerloo line or to Euston, Watford Junction and intermediate stations via London Overground Lioness line or to Harrow & Wealdstone station using Bakerloo line trains. Brondesbury Park station, on the London Overground Mildmay line, is near the northeast corner of Queen's Park. To the northwest of the area is Kensal Rise station also on the London Overground Mildmay line.

Queen's Park is also well served by the London Bus network with the 6, 18, 28, 36, 52, 98, 187, 206, 228, 302, 316, 452, N18 and N98 all passing through the area.

== Notable residents ==
- Lily Allen – singer / songwriter and author
- Alison Brooks – architect
- Karen Buck – Member of Parliament for Regent's Park and Kensington North (1997–2010) and Westminster North (2010-2024). She previously represented Queen's Park ward on Westminster City Council.
- Daniel Craig – actor
- Fredo – rapper
- Jason Isaacs – actor
- Dua Lipa – pop star
- Sienna Miller – actress
- Cillian Murphy – actor
- Thandiwe Newton – actress
- Michael Page – professional boxer and mixed martial artist
- Eartha Pond – former professional footballer, campaigner, and Chair of Queen's Park Community Council
- Alexandra Shulman – ex-editor of British Vogue
- Zadie Smith – author
- Samantha Spiro – actor
- Mark Strong – actor
- Edward Sutcliffe - painter
