= Brondesbury railway station =

London Overground station

Brondesbury
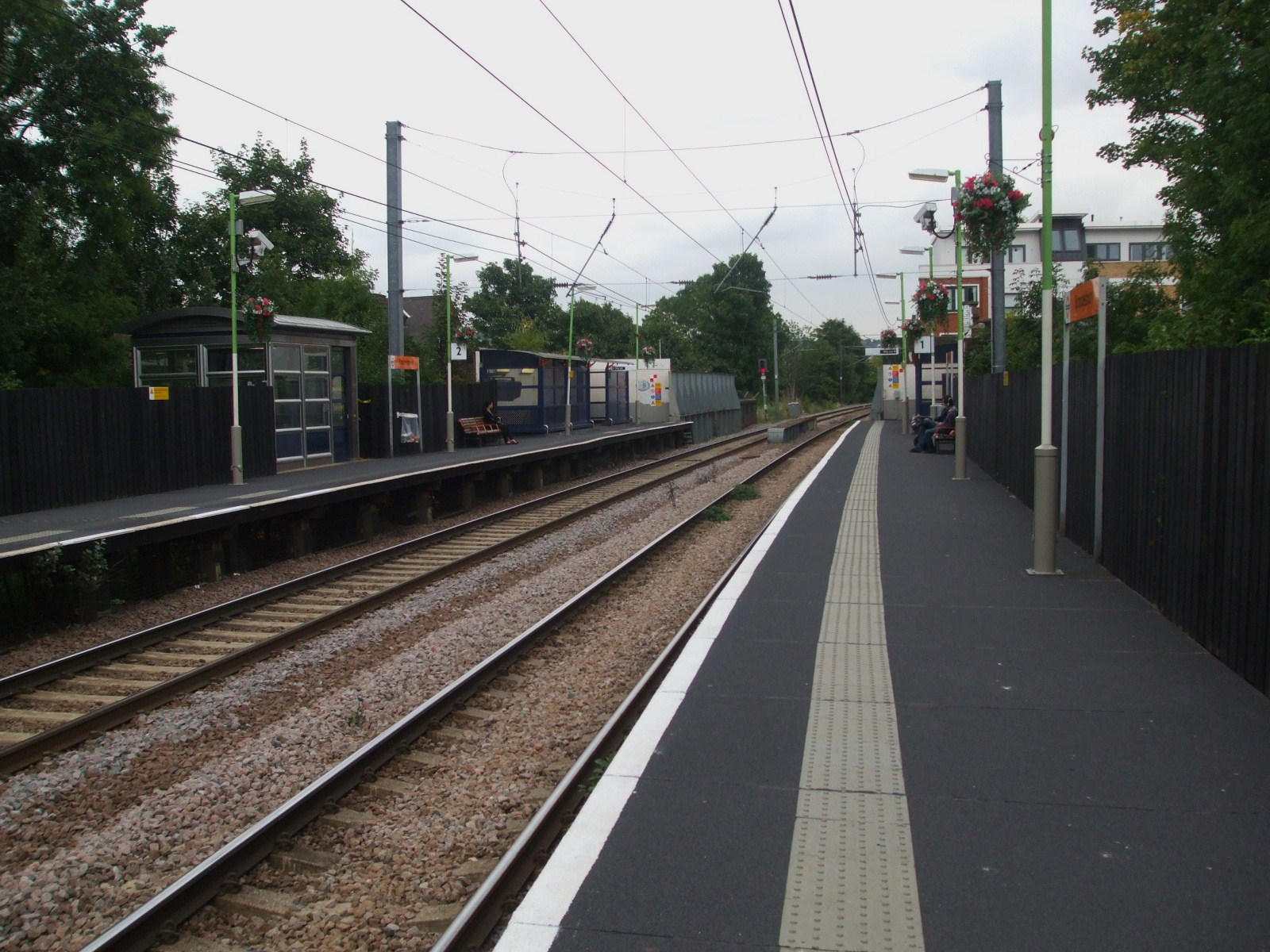
- Interactive map of Brondesbury

General information
- Location: Kilburn
- Local authority: London Borough of Brent
- Managed by: London Overground
- Owner: Network Rail
- Station code: BSY
- DfT category: E
- Number of platforms: 2
- Fare zone: 2
- OSI: Kilburn

National Rail annual entry and exit
- 2020–21: ▼1.152 million
- 2021–22: ▲1.977 million
- 2022–23: ▲2.179 million
- 2023–24: ▲2.405 million
- 2024–25: ▲2.443 million

Railway companies
- Original company: Hampstead Junction Railway
- Pre-grouping: London and North Western Railway
- Post-grouping: London, Midland and Scottish Railway

Key dates
- 2 January 1860: Opened as Edgeware Road (Kilburn)
- 1 November 1865: Renamed Edgware Road
- 1 January 1872: Renamed Edgware Road and Brondesbury
- 1 January 1873: Renamed Brondesbury (Edgware Road)
- 1 May 1883: Renamed Brondesbury

Other information
- External links: Departures; Facilities
- Coordinates: 51.5451°N 0.202°W

Brondesbury is a station on the Mildmay line of the London Overground. It is situated on a viaduct crossing Kilburn High Road in the Brondesbury area of Kilburn in the London Borough of Brent. It is approximately 200 m (660 ft) south-east of Kilburn station and half a mile north-west of Kilburn High Road station.

== History ==
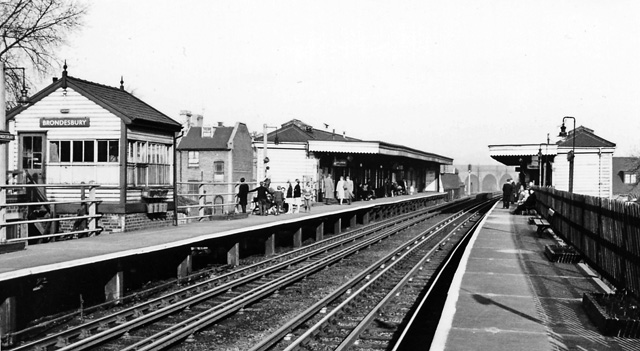
Brondesbury Station in 1961

Brondesbury station opened on 2 January 1860 as Edgeware [sic] Road (Kilburn) station on the Hampstead Junction Railway. It was renamed several times: Edgware Road on 1 November 1865, Edgware Road and Brondesbury on 1 January 1872, Brondesbury (Edgware Road) on 1 January 1873, Brondesbury on 1 May 1883. A signal box was in use at the station until 5 February 1962.

A number of plans were put forward between 1890 and 1926 to build an underground railway along the Edgware Road, and would have seen the construction of a Tube station at Brondesbury. None of the schemes succeeded and no such line was ever built.

== Services ==
All services at Brondesbury are operated by London Overground as part of the Mildmay line using Class 378 EMUs.

The typical off-peak service in trains per hour is:

- 8 tph to Stratford via Camden Road
- 4 tph to Richmond
- 4 tph to Clapham Junction

During the late evenings, the services to and from Clapham Junction do not operate.

Preceding station	London Overground	Following station
Brondesbury Park towards Clapham Junction or Richmond	Mildmay line North London line	West Hampstead towards Stratford

== Connections ==
London Buses routes 16, 32, 189, 316 and 632 and night route N16 serve the station.
