= Kensal Rise railway station =

London Overground station

Kensal Rise
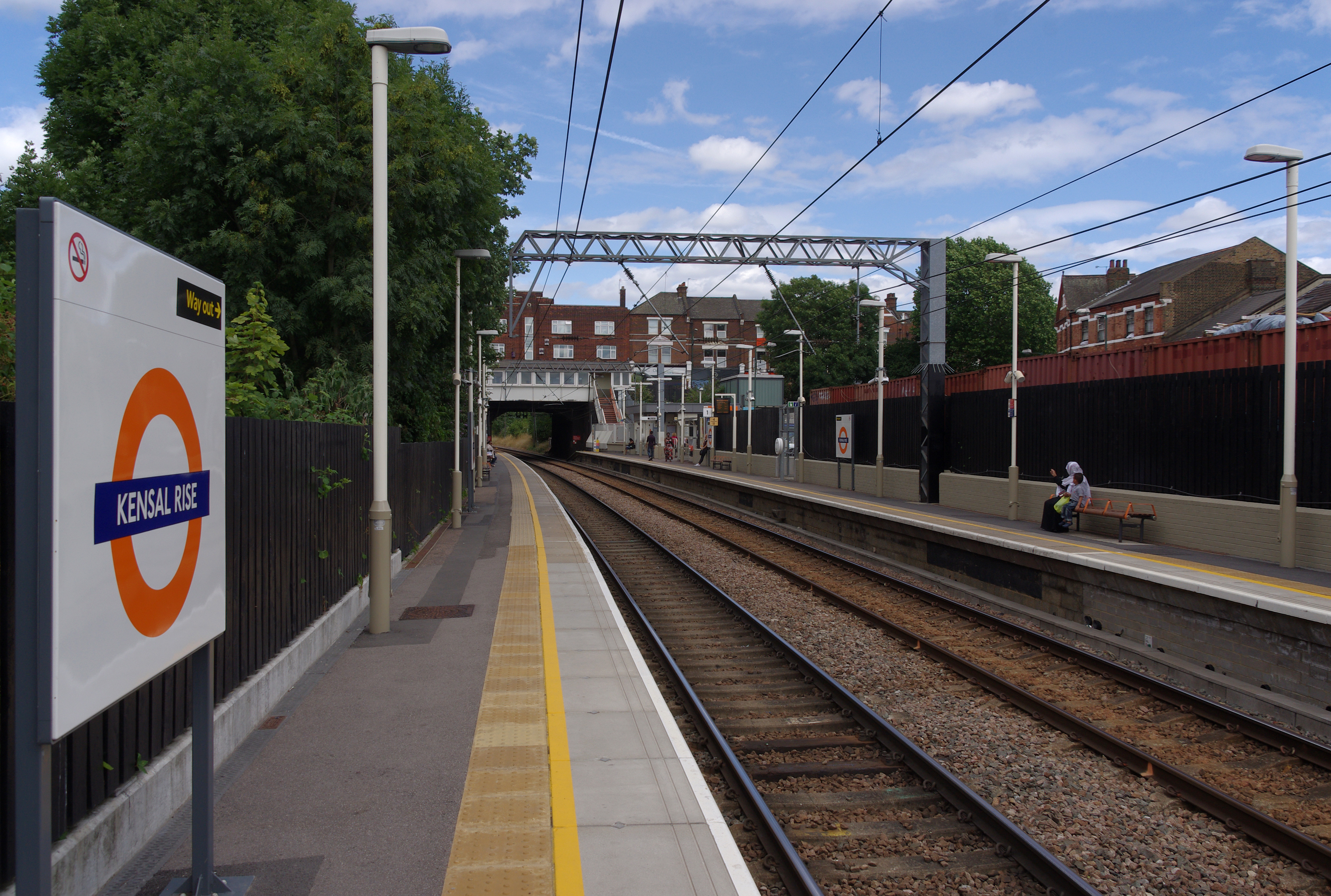
- Interactive map of Kensal Rise

General information
- Location: Queen's Park
- Local authority: London Borough of Brent
- Grid reference: TQ235832
- Managed by: London Overground
- Owner: Network Rail
- Station code: KNR
- DfT category: E
- Number of platforms: 2
- Accessible: Yes
- Fare zone: 2

National Rail annual entry and exit
- 2020–21: ▼1.100 million
- 2021–22: ▲1.929 million
- 2022–23: ▲2.199 million
- 2023–24: ▲2.554 million
- 2024–25: ▲2.608 million

Key dates
- 1873: Opened

Other information
- External links: Departures; Facilities
- Coordinates: 51.5342°N 0.2208°W

Kensal Rise is a station on the Mildmay line of the London Overground, situated on Chamberlayne Road, Kensal Rise in north-west London. The station is in London fare zone 2.

== History ==
It opened in 1873 as Kensal Green, replacing Kensal Green & Harlesden railway station which opened in 1861 at the crossing of Green Lane (later Wrottesley Road), lying in between the present station and Willesden Junction. The present station was renamed Kensal Rise in 1890. It is close to the newer Kensal Green station built on the Watford DC Line in 1916. Since late 2007 both stations are now served by London Overground, although Kensal Green is managed by London Underground, being additionally served by the Bakerloo line.

== Services ==
All services at Kensal Rise are operated by London Overground as part of the Mildmay line using Class 378 EMUs.

The typical off-peak service in trains per hour is:

- 8 tph to Stratford via Camden Road
- 4 tph to Richmond
- 4 tph to Clapham Junction

During the late evenings, the services to and from Clapham Junction do not operate.

| Preceding station | London Overground | Following station |
|---|---|---|
| Willesden Junction towards Clapham Junction or Richmond | Mildmay line North London line | Brondesbury Park towards Stratford |

== Connections ==
London Buses routes 6, 28, 52, 187 and 302 serve the station.

== See also ==
- Kensal Green station
