= North London line =

Railway line in London

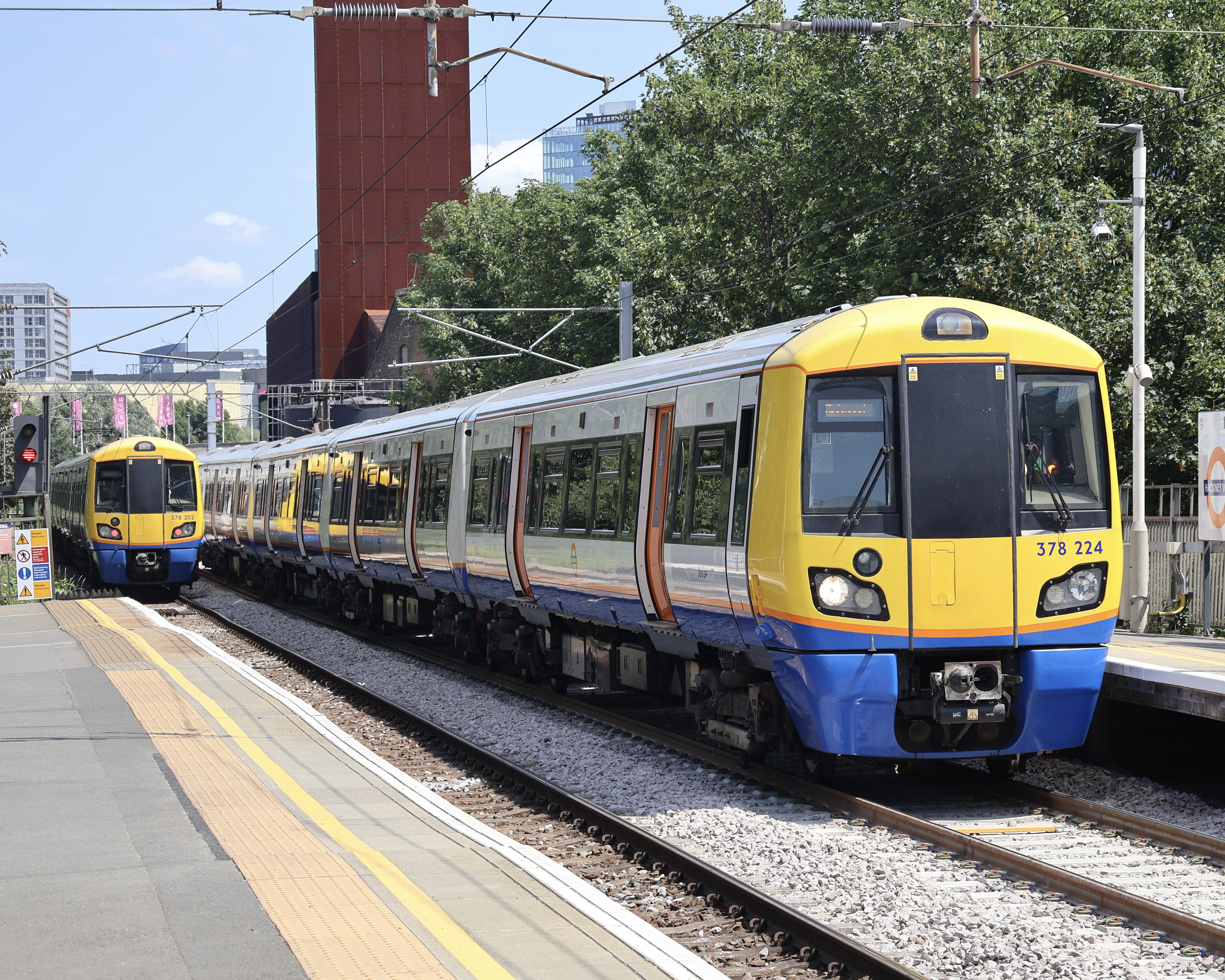
- Class 378 Capitalstar at Hackney Wick in 2025

Overview
- Status: Operational
- Owner: Network Rail
- Locale: Greater London
- Termini: Richmond; Stratford
- Stations: 27

Service
- Type: Rapid transit; suburban rail; freight rail
- System: National Rail; London Overground; London Underground
- Depot: Willesden TMD
- Rolling stock: Overground: Class 378 / Class 710; Underground: S7 Stock

History
- Opened: 1869

Technical
- Number of tracks: Two (mostly); Four (York Way–Arundel Square)
- Track gauge: 1,435 mm (4 ft 8 1/2 in) standard gauge
- Electrification: Overhead line, 25 kV 50 Hz AC; Third rail, 750 V DC
Route map
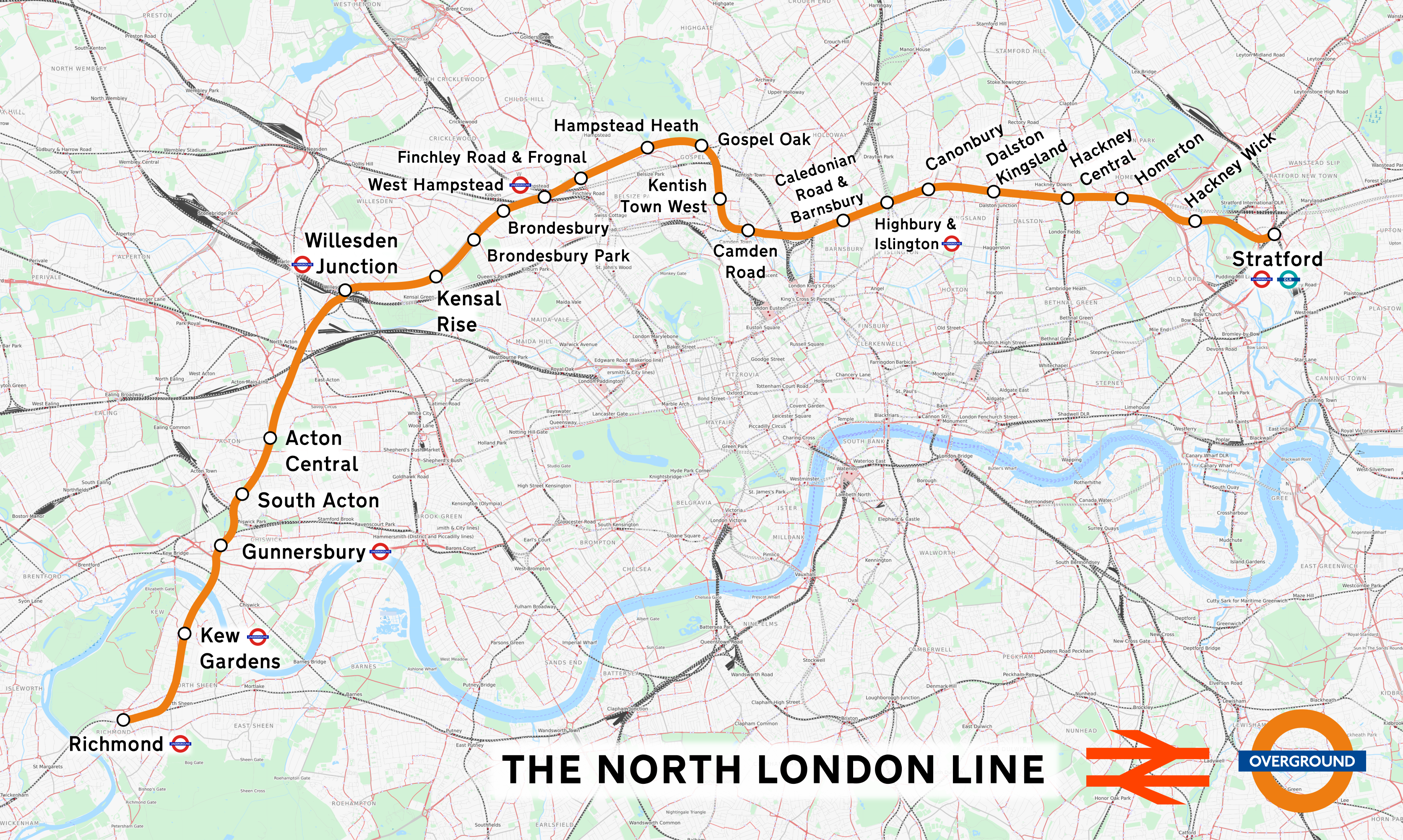
(Click to expand)

The North London line is a railway line which passes through the inner suburbs of London, England between Richmond in the southwest and Stratford in the east, avoiding central London. Its route is a rough semicircle. Much of it originated as part of the North London Railway and the current route is the result of a series of amalgamations, closures and reopenings. It has a mix of third-rail and overhead electrical power supply. It is heavily used by freight services in addition to the Mildmay line passenger service on the London Overground. TfL took over the line in 2007 and introduced new stock as well as putting the line on the Tube map. It closed for four months in 2010 between Gospel Oak and Stratford and had a reduced service for another year to allow platform extensions and signalling upgrades. In November 2024, the London Overground service on the line was named, along with that on the West London line, the Mildmay line to honour the Mildmay Mission Hospital which treated victims of the HIV/AIDS crisis in the 1980s.

== History ==
=== Formation ===
The North London line between Richmond and North Woolwich derived from five connecting sections which were opened over 25 years from 1846:

- The easternmost section opened as the Eastern Counties and Thames Junction Railway in 1846/7 between Stratford and North Woolwich. The later construction of the Royal Victoria Dock necessitated a swing-bridge on the original route south of Canning Town which was rerouted in 1850 via Custom House and the Connaught Tunnel. The original route was retained as the Silvertown Tramway, a local freight line connected at both ends to the new main line.
- The main central section opened from 1850 to 1852 as the East and West India Docks and Birmingham Junction Railway (renamed the North London Railway (NLR) in 1853). This gave a link from the Euston main line near Primrose Hill to the docks at Poplar via Bow.
- In the west, the North and South Western Junction Railway was opened in 1853 from Willesden Junction to a junction with the Hounslow Loop Line near Kew Bridge.
- The last link in the east was opened between the NLR near Victoria Park and Stratford in 1854.
- To obviate NLR trains running on the busy Euston main line, the Hampstead Junction Railway was opened from the NLR at Camden Road to Willesden via Hampstead Heath in 1860.
- To give the NLR direct access to the City of London, the City extension to Broad Street was opened from Dalston Junction in 1865.
- The final part of the route was the opening of a link from South Acton to Richmond by the London and South Western Railway (LSWR) in 1869.

=== Developments ===
The line from Broad Street to Kew Bridge and Richmond was electrified by the LNWR in 1916 on the fourth-rail DC system.

In 1944, passenger services on the NLR Poplar branch ceased. Freight traffic continued on the branch to the docks on the Isle of Dogs until 1980. The track bed of the southern part of the branch, from Poplar to Bow, was used for the Docklands Light Railway (DLR) branch to Stratford.

The service was listed for closure in the 1963 Beeching Report, with losses claimed as being £69,000 per year (equivalent to £1,279,000 in 2024). It was saved after a huge campaign. The line was Grant Aided under the Transport Act 1968 and came under threat when the Conservative Government of 1970–71 proposed to reduce Grant Aid funding. That threat, eventually lifted, led to the founding of a new campaign group, the North London Line Committee, which tried to work with British Rail management to promote the service.

In 1979, the North Woolwich to Stratford service was extended to Camden Road as the Crosstown Linkline service, using the same Cravens-built diesel multiple unit trains. There were no intermediate stations until, in 1980, Hackney Wick was opened, near the site of the former Victoria Park station and Hackney Central was re-opened; then Homerton re-opened in 1985 (the two latter stations had closed in 1944). New platforms were built at West Ham for interchange with the adjacent Underground station.

The part of the line between the West London and East Coast Main Lines was proposed in the mid-1990s to be used for Regional Eurostar services, which would travel from the lines into Waterloo International station to points north of London. A proposed link to Heathrow Airport would have also used the line between Willesden Junction and Acton. Regional Eurostar was eventually cancelled.

=== Rolling stock ===
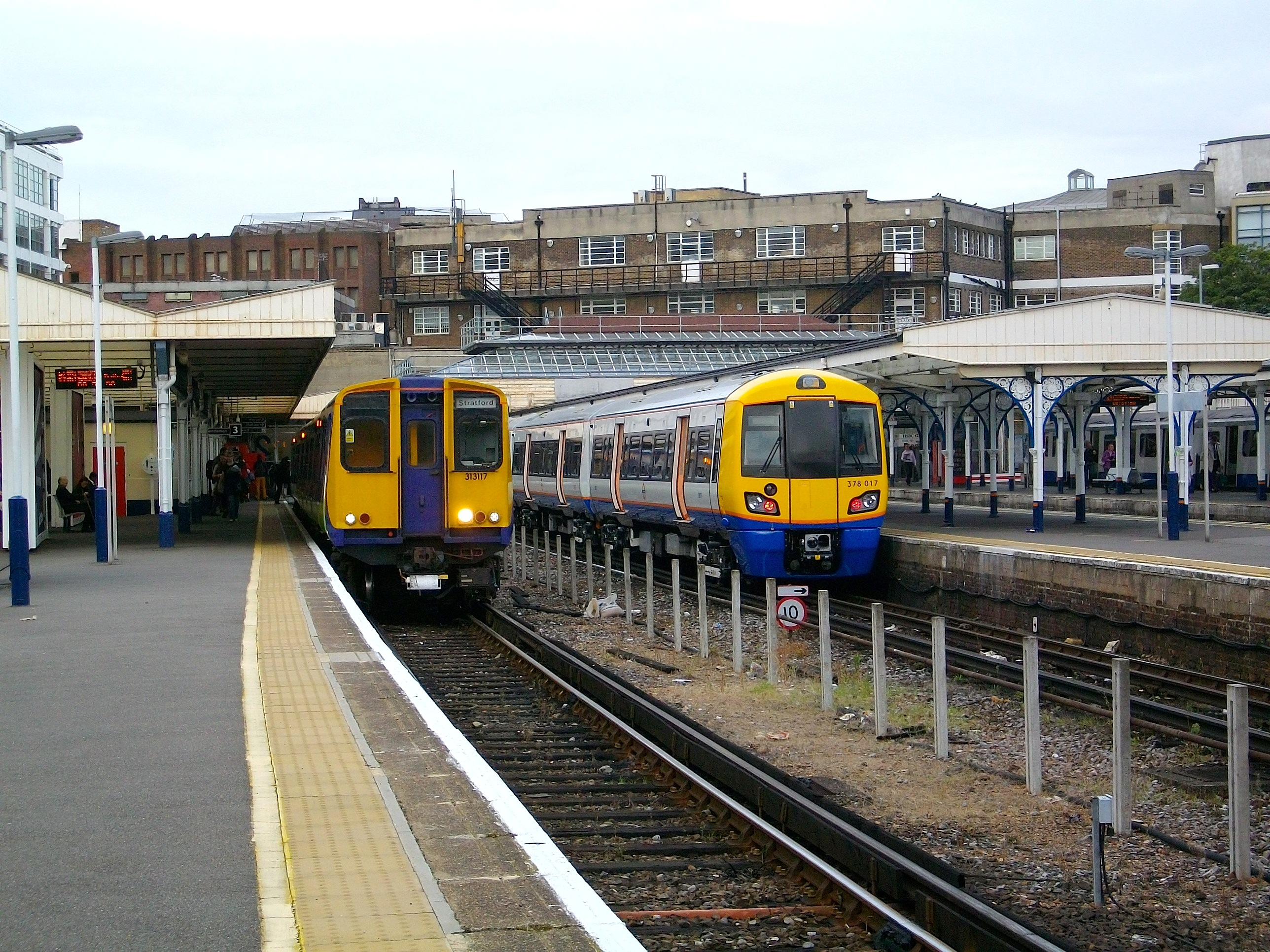
Old vs new: a Class 313 and its replacement, a Class 378 Capitalstar at Richmond

The line was originally operated by steam-hauled trains which were replaced after electrification by London and North Western Railway EMUs built from 1914 and augmented by later EMUs built in the 1930s by the London, Midland and Scottish Railway. These had all been replaced by the early 1960s with dedicated short-wheelbase trains (shared with the Watford DC line) built by the Southern Region at Eastleigh (using underframes built at Ashford) from 1957 which were later designated by British Railways as Class 501. These were succeeded by Southern Region Class 416 EMU for a short period, these units being allocated to Selhurst depot in south London. Class 416 trains were in turn succeeded by Class 313 EMUs, which worked the route until 2010 when London Overground introduced Class 378 Capitalstar four-car dual-voltage electric trains compatible with both 750 V DC third-rail and 25 kV AC overhead power sources, and all of these units were by 2017 operating in 5-car formations to address the additional demand on the route.

=== Closures ===
In 1986, Broad Street station closed and the Tottenham Hale–Stratford link and the station at Lea Bridge ceased to be used by regular passenger trains. The line between Dalston and North Woolwich was electrified on the third-rail system and Broad Street services were diverted to North Woolwich using former Southern Region 2-EPB types built in the 1950s. The two-car trains soon proved too small and were replaced by three-car Class 313 electric multiple units. The new service was branded by British Rail as the North London Link, and some signs using this name still exist.

In December 2006, as with the Poplar branch (see above), the line between Stratford and North Woolwich was permanently closed to make a way for a future DLR extension from Canning Town to Stratford International (which opened in February 2011). The section south of Canning Town was not used by the DLR, as it is largely duplicated by the DLR King George V branch. Instead, the section became part of the Elizabeth line's branch to Abbey Wood, which opened in May 2022. The section south of Stratford had always been the 'Cinderella' end of the line, in that when there were operating problems it was common for trains to be turned short at Stratford.

=== Poor performance before the TfL takeover ===
Despite favourable performance figures, the North London line used to be regarded by frequent travellers as offering a poor and unreliable service with extremely congested trains which were often cancelled shortly before they were due to arrive. A 2006 London Assembly report described the current service as "shabby, unreliable, unsafe and overcrowded", proposing the transfer of the service to Transport for London (TfL) as a solution to improve the quality of the service due to upgrade plans which coincided with the extension of the East London line.

=== TfL ===
The North London line, as part of Silverlink, along with the West London line, Gospel Oak to Barking line and the Watford DC line, was transferred to Transport for London (TfL) in 2007 to form its new London Overground service. TfL began to remodel stations, integrate lines and, following the transfer and extension of the East London line, created an orbital rail service. TfL also brought in new trains and the lines, which previously appeared on tube maps following a public campaign, gained their own colour.

TfL closed the line in February 2010 between Gospel Oak and Stratford for the installation of a new signalling system and the rebuilding or extension of platforms to allow four-car trains to run on the line; most NLL platforms had been reduced in usable length (where they had not been originally short) in the late 1960s when services were reduced to three-carriage trains only. The line reopened on 1 June 2010 with a reduced service and none on Sundays, and with the upgrade work completed, the full seven-day service resumed on 22 May 2011.

=== Former services ===
In addition to the primary Broad Street – Richmond service, there were services that linked Broad Street with Harrow & Wealdstone and Watford Junction on the Watford DC line. Most of these were routed via the line between South Hampstead and Camden Road, calling at Primrose Hill although some travelled via Hampstead Heath and joined the DC line at Willesden Junction. Prior to electrification in the 1960s, other services ran as far as Tring on the West Coast Main Line via Primrose Hill and Willesden Junction Main Line (now demolished). By the time that Broad Street closed in 1986, the Watford services operated only in the rush hours; they were diverted to Liverpool Street by way of a new link in Hackney, known as the Graham Road Curve. Trains were frequently cancelled owing to rolling stock shortages; these circumstances had begun some years earlier with service reductions and scrapping of trains in the late 1960s, followed in later years by closure of depots at Croxley Green and Stonebridge Park preventing stabling of spare stock. Along with what eventually became a lack of trains timetabled to serve Liverpool Street to match the needs of rush-hour passengers, this inevitably led to falling patronage. British Rail applied to close the service in 1990, and the last trains ran two years later.

In 2000, Anglia Railways started a service between Basingstoke and Ipswich, utilising parts of the North London line. The service was called London Crosslink and ran up to five times a day at roughly two-hourly intervals. The service called only at principal stations such as Staines, Feltham and Brentford. On the North London line, the trains called only at Stratford, Highbury & Islington, Camden Road (some services), West Hampstead and Willesden Junction. The service was withdrawn in 2002.

The AC electrification of the eastern part of the North London line uses the previously unelectrified northern pair of tracks, which were also partially singled at the same time. Between Canonbury and Highbury & Islington, there is a line which links to the East Coast Main Line at Finsbury Park. This used to carry passenger trains to and from various main line stations (such as Edgware, Alexandra Palace, High Barnet, Welwyn Garden City and others) over part of the North London line to Broad Street Station; however, with the electrification of the Great Northern Electrics suburban lines in 1976, trains were diverted into Moorgate and London King's Cross stations, so since then this link has only been used for freight trains. It too was singled concurrent with the AC electrification of the eastern part of the North London line.

== Route ==
Its route is a rough semicircle. Between Richmond and Gunnersbury, London Underground's District line shares tracks with the Mildmay line; the entire route is owned and maintained by Network Rail.

=== Stations ===
Station
Richmond
Kew Gardens
Gunnersbury
South Acton
Acton Central
Willesden Junction
Kensal Rise
Brondesbury Park
Brondesbury
West Hampstead
Finchley Road & Frognal
Hampstead Heath
Gospel Oak
Kentish Town West
Camden Road
Caledonian Road & Barnsbury
Highbury & Islington
Canonbury
Dalston Kingsland
Hackney Central
Homerton
Hackney Wick
Stratford

=== Track ===
Most of the line runs in a curve across north London. Only Richmond and Kew Gardens stations at the western end are south of the River Thames. The river crossing is made by Kew Railway Bridge on tracks which are shared with the London Underground District line. The location of the eastern extremity has varied over the years. Between 1944 and 1986, it was at Broad Street station; then it was switched to North Woolwich. Later, it was cut back to Stratford. A tunnel, the Hampstead Heath tunnel, runs under Hampstead between Finchley Road & Frognal and Hampstead Heath. The line is double track throughout, with quadruple track between York Way (near St. Pancras) and Arundel Square (near Highbury and Islington). The former North Woolwich branch included a section of single track between Custom House and North Woolwich stations, and the Broad Street branch was at one time formed of quadruple track.

During the February–May 2010 blockade, the Caledonian Road & Barnsbury, Highbury & Islington and Canonbury stations were rebuilt to allow the extended East London line to serve Highbury & Islington on fully segregated tracks on the south side of the cutting. Under the reinstated four-track arrangement, the North London line runs parallel to the double-track East London line from Dalston Kingsland to Highbury and Islington. The line then becomes quadruple-track at Arundel Square, with passenger services using the inner pair of tracks and freight services using the outer pair, before the line reduces to double track at York Way, near St. Pancras.

=== Traction current supply ===
Originally, the line was electrified in 1914–15 using the fourth rail +420 V / -210 V system, as used by London Underground. This was changed in the 1970s to +630 V / 0 V; the trains (then EMUs of a design unique to this and the DC line) were modified to the same basic traction supply arrangements as SR 3rd rail EMUs; the centre/negative current rail was removed except where coincident four-rail running was required between Richmond and Gunnersbury for the Underground trains that share this section, the centre rail there being bonded to the running rail used for current return. The line is now electrified using that same third rail system from Richmond to Acton Central, but with overhead lines now used from Acton Central to Stratford. The line into Broad Street used third-rail supply and, when the through service to North Woolwich started in 1985, trains used the third rail throughout. When the trains were replaced a few years later by dual-voltage Class 313 trains, it became possible to use the overhead line equipment which had been added to parts of the line for the benefit of freight trains; there had been some unexpected difficulties with earth currents from the third rail system which this overcame. This use was steadily extended, and trains had to make a number of changes between traction current supplies during their short journey; these were at Hackney Wick, Dalston Kingsland, Camden Road and Acton Central. With the final upgrade of the line between Camden Road and Stratford, the need to change traction current systems on this stretch was eliminated, and now the only changeover takes place at Acton Central for the short section to Richmond. The line ran on third rail throughout the 1980s until 1996 when it was closed for several months for conversion to overhead power, reopening electrified with OHLE later in 1996. In 2010, the last of the third-rail sections around Camden Road station were completely removed.

== Connections ==
The line crosses, or comes into contact with, a very large number of other railway lines, especially lines radiating from central London. This does provide opportunities to move between different sectors of suburban London without having to enter the central zone.

=== Interchanges shown on the tube map ===
- at Richmond, to and from South Western Railway services including the Kingston loop line.
- at Gunnersbury, connecting NLL services north of the station to District line services east of the station.
- at Willesden Junction, with the Bakerloo line, Watford DC line and West London line.
- at West Hampstead, with the Jubilee line and Thameslink stations, each situated a short walk either side of the NLL station.
- at Gospel Oak, to and from the Suffragette line of London Overground.
- at Highbury & Islington, to and from the Victoria line, the East London line and Great Northern services to Moorgate, Finsbury Park and the Great Northern Line.
- at Canonbury, with the East London line.
- at Hackney Central which is linked via direct passenger walkway to Hackney Downs station for London Overground and Greater Anglia services to and from Liverpool Street.
- at Stratford, to and from the Central line, Great Eastern Main line Greater Anglia services between East Anglia and Liverpool Street, the Jubilee line, and Docklands Light Railway.

=== Other interchanges ===
- at Brondesbury, 220 m south of Kilburn on the Jubilee line
- at Finchley Road & Frognal, about 400 m north of Finchley Road on the Metropolitan and Jubilee lines
- at Camden Road, about 400 m north-east of Camden Town on the Northern line
- at Caledonian Road & Barnsbury, 670 m north of Caledonian Road on the Piccadilly line
- at South Acton, 1 km south-east of Acton Town on the Piccadilly and District lines.

==== Alternative stations – lines merge nearby ====
- Dalston Kingsland is 225 m north of Dalston Junction; the two lines converge at the next station west (Canonbury)

=== Former interchanges ===
- At North Woolwich, passengers could cross the Thames via the Woolwich foot tunnel or take the free ferry to Woolwich Arsenal station for connections on the North Kent line to the Medway towns, Gravesend, Dartford, Sidcup, Abbey Wood, Blackheath, Lewisham, Greenwich and Central London. This service is now provided by King George V DLR station which offers direct rail services to Woolwich Arsenal from North Woolwich, providing quick interchange to services on the North Kent line.

== Current operations ==
It is heavily used by freight services in addition to the Mildmay line passenger service on the London Overground.

=== Service levels ===
Trains run seven days a week, from approximately 05:00 (08:00 Sundays) until 00:58. There are eight trains per hour between Stratford and Willesden Junction, four of which continue to Clapham Junction and four to Richmond. (These are the timings as of Feb 2025)

New three-car Class 378 trains were introduced on 29 July 2009 (later extended to four in 2011 then five coaches in 2013). The air-conditioned trains, combined with improved signalling and passenger information, dramatically improved the service, making it an effective alternative to travelling through central London for many orbital journeys.

=== East London line extension ===
From March 2011, the extended East London line connects to the NLL, with ELL services joining the line west of Dalston Kingsland, running to Highbury & Islington.

=== Five-car operation ===
Transport for London extended platforms at some stations along the route to prepare the line for five-car operations in 2015, a project aimed at combating overcrowding on the line. The project was successfully completed and the first five-car trains started to run in summer 2015.

=== Renaming ===
In July 2023, TFL announced that it would be giving each of the six Overground services unique names by the end of 2024. In February 2024, it was confirmed that the North London / West London section would be named the Mildmay line (to honour the Mildmay Hospital in Bethnal Green, which treated victims of the HIV/AIDS crisis in the 1980s) and would be coloured sky blue on the updated network map. The renaming was implemented in November 2024.

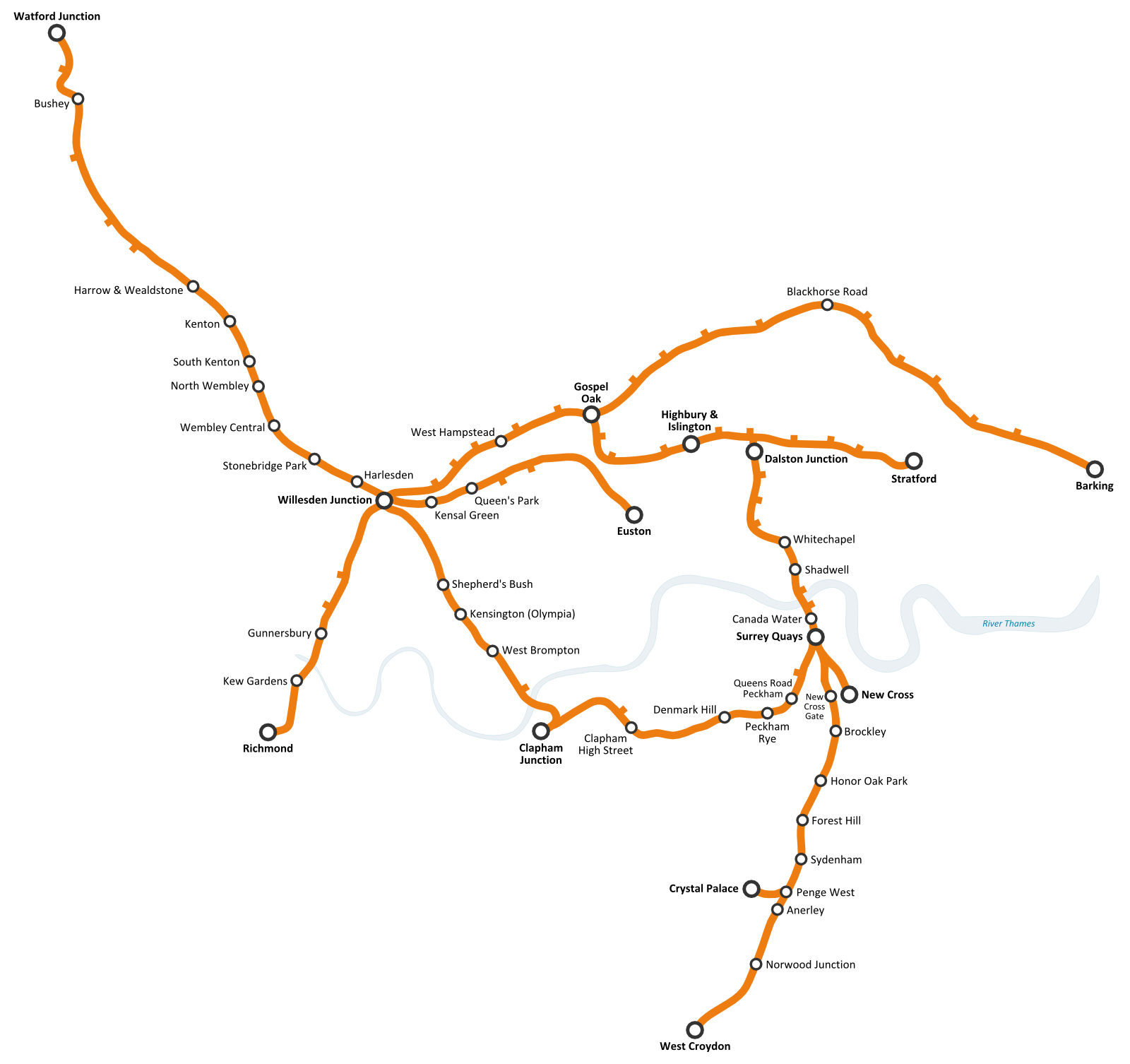
Map of the London Overground network, with the NLL connected to other lines

== Proposed developments ==
=== Maiden Lane ===
Maiden Lane station may be reopened by Camden Council; however, the Office of Rail Regulation has not included this in the current plans.

=== Crossrail to Hounslow ===
Hounslow council has proposed that part of the North London line be used as a branch of Crossrail to Hounslow, which would see Crossrail services serving Acton Central and South Acton. It was not included in the initial Crossrail bill but could form part of a later extension.

=== Old Oak Common Lane ===
Under the former government's plans for High Speed 2 line from London Euston to Birmingham, a new station called Old Oak Common was to be built by 2025 serving the North London line, West London line, High Speed 2 and Crossrail. The new government supports the idea after it had been opposed at first.

=== North Acton ===
Another new station at North Acton is proposed for interchange with the Central line, but it might require the Central line station being moved to the east.

=== High Speed 2 ===
The planned link between the proposed High Speed 2 line and the existing High Speed 1 line would have used the North London line alignment around Camden Road station, which might have reduced the existing or future capacity of the line. Its heavy investment in the line and the passenger growth on it has made Transport for London against the alignment's use as a link between the two High Speed lines. That link has now been removed from the parliamentary bill.

=== Camden Highline ===
From 2015 to 2026, there was a proposal for a walking connection between Camden Town and King's Cross. The Camden Highline was a proposed public park and garden walk alongside the North London line. The project was abandoned in May 2026.

== Closed stations ==
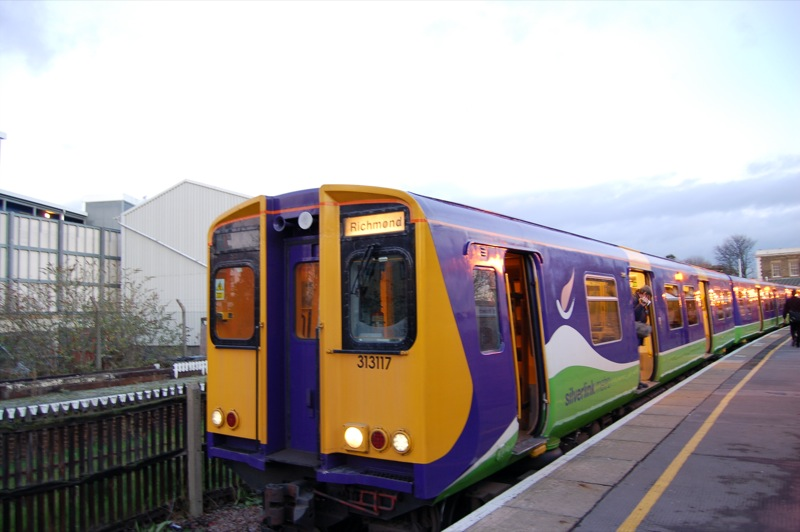
Silverlink Metro 313117 at North Woolwich on 9 December 2006, the final day of service at that station

Closed stations apart from those on the closed sections of the line are:

- Kensal Green & Harlesden
- Maiden Lane
- Mildmay Park
- Victoria Park

=== City Extension ===
On 1 November 1865 the NLR opened its City Extension, mostly on a viaduct from a triangular junction at Dalston to Broad Street in the city, with these stations:

- Dalston Junction
- Haggerston
- Shoreditch
- Broad Street

The extension closed on 30 June 1986, but although the track was lifted the viaduct remained in place. The route was re-opened in 2010 as part of the extended East London line, which, like the North London line, is operated by London Overground.

=== North Woolwich section ===
On 10 December 2006, the former Eastern Counties and Thames Junction Railway line between Stratford and North Woolwich was closed to allow building of a Docklands Light Railway line to Stratford International between Stratford and Canning Town. Part of the south end of the closed section is used by the Elizabeth line.

NLL stations closed were:

- West Ham
- Canning Town
- Custom House
- Silvertown
- North Woolwich

DLR and Jubilee line services are not affected at the first three of those stations.

The DLR line to Stratford International uses the former NLL low-level platforms at Stratford. NLL trains now terminate at new platforms on the north side of the high-level station.

== Bibliography ==
- Wayne Asher, Wayne (2015). A very Political Railway – the rescue of the North London Line. ISBN 978-1-85414-378-5
- White, H P (1971). A Regional History of the Railways of Great Britain, Volume 3 – Greater London. ISBN 0-7153-5337-3
