= Kilburn Lane =

Street in London, England

Coordinates: 51.53341°N 0.21175°W

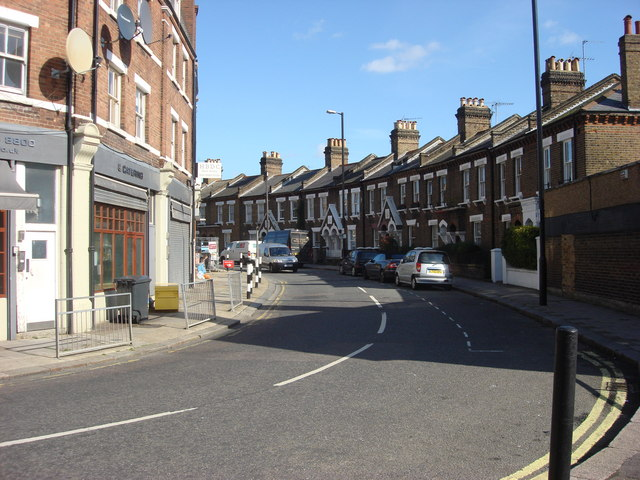
Kilburn Lane near the western end

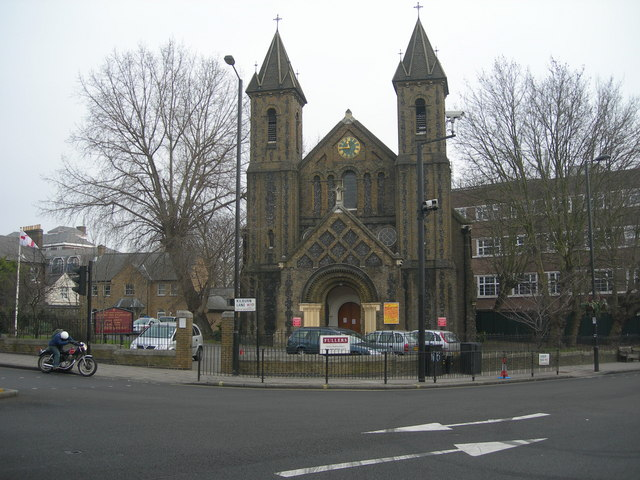
St. John the Evangelist's Church.

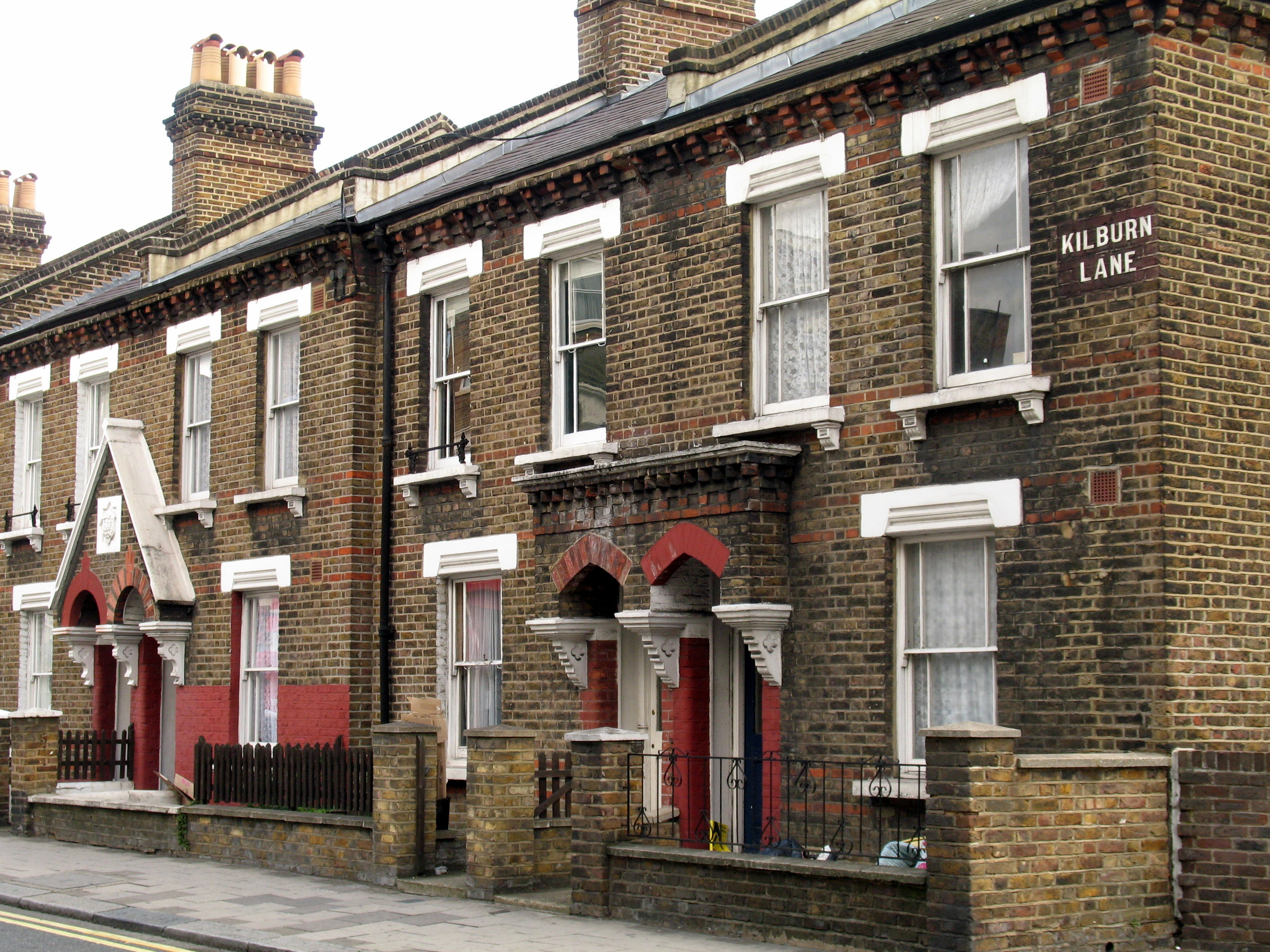
Houses of the Victorian Queens Park Estate on the south side of the Lane.

Kilburn Lane is a street in Northwest London which runs through North Kensington, London and Kilburn, London. Its route marks the boundary between the City of Westminster and the London Borough of Brent. To the east it continues into South Kilburn as Carlton Vale. At the western end the street curves southwards until it meets Harrow Road, becoming Ladbroke Grove and continuing across the Grand Union Canal.

It is a historic road, marking a route from the old village of Kensal to Kilburn Priory before Henry VIII's dissolution of the monasteries in the sixteenth century. During the seventeenth century part of it became known as Flowerhills Lane. The area was rural for most of its existence, as major development didn't take place until the nineteenth century when London expanded into new suburbs. At this time the area directly south of the Lane was known as Queen's Park Estate (and gave its name to the football club Queens Park Rangers which was founded there in the 1880s), but in the twentieth century this name has come to refer to the area north of Kilburn Lane centred on Queen's Park tube station.

At the junction with Harrow Road the Anglican St. John the Evangelist's Church was opened in 1844. Kilburn Lane also contains the late Victorian West Kilburn Baptist Church.

== Bibliography ==
- Bebbington, Gillian. London Street Names. Batsford, 1972.
- Cockburn, J. S., King, H. P. F. & McDonnell, K. G. T. & A History of the County of Middlesex. Institute of Historical Research, 1989.
- Cherry, Bridget & Pevsner, Nikolaus. London 3: North West. Yale University Press, 2002.
- Crabb, Steve. Queen's Park: A History. The History Press, 2022.
- Hibbert, Christopher Weinreb, Ben, Keay, John & Keay, Julia. The London Encyclopaedia. Pan Macmillan, 2011.
