= London Buses route 28 =

London bus route

28
- Metroline Wright Eclipse Gemini 2 bodied Volvo B9TL at Shepherd's Bush station in August 2026

Overview
- Operator: Metroline
- Garage: Willesden Junction
- Vehicle: Volvo B9TL Wright Eclipse Gemini 2
- Night-time: N28 and N31

Route
- Start: Southside Wandsworth
- Via: Fulham; Kensington High Street; Kensington Palace; Notting Hill; Westbourne; Harrow Road
- End: Kensal Rise station

London Buses route 28 is a Transport for London contracted bus route in London, England. Running between Southside Wandsworth and Kensal Rise station, it is operated by Metroline.

== History ==
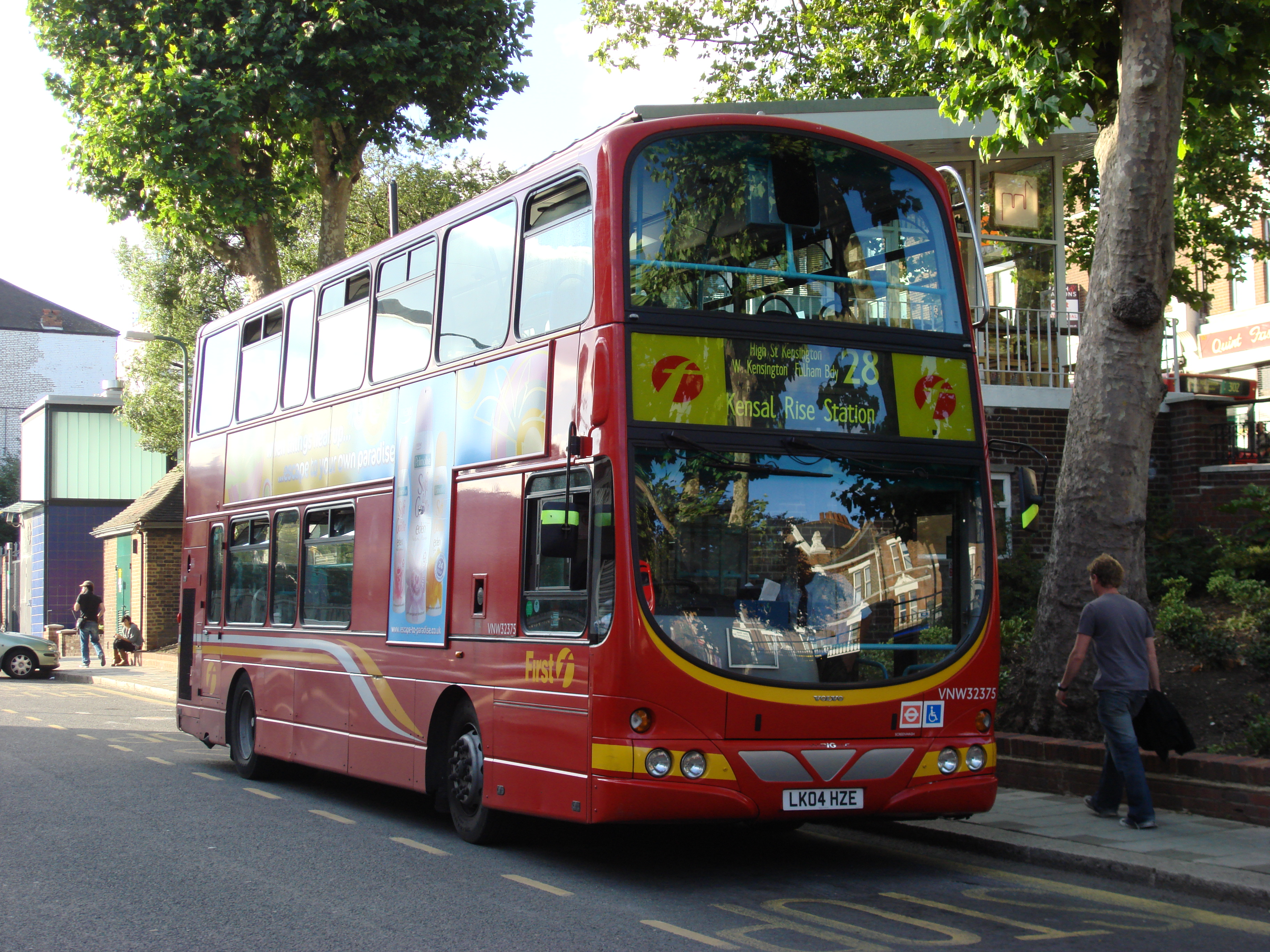
First London Wright Eclipse Gemini bodied Volvo B7TL at Kensal Rise station in June 2007

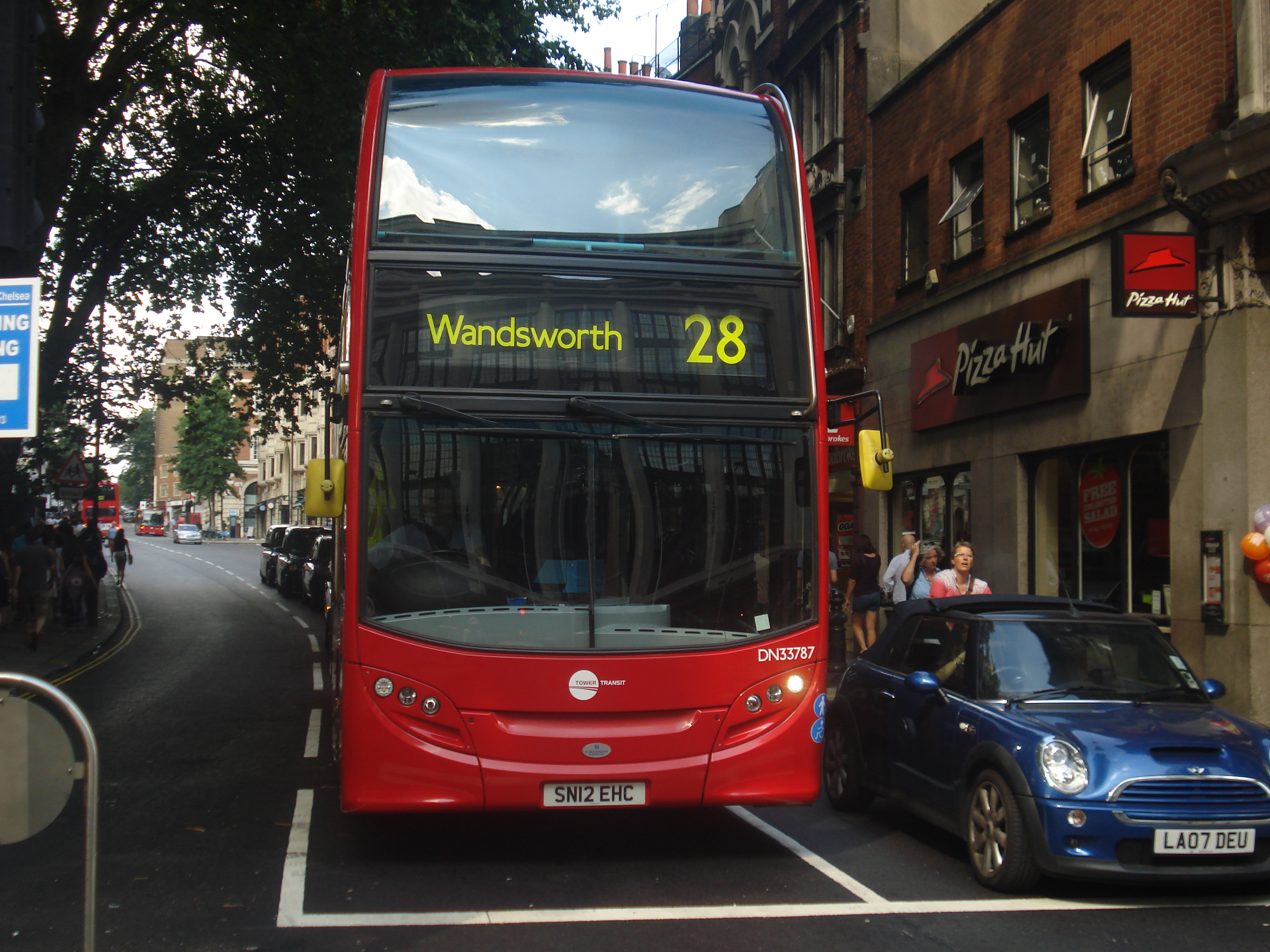
Tower Transit Alexander Dennis Enviro400 at Kensington High Street in August 2013

In 1988, Gold Arrow routes 28 and 31 were introduced, operated by CentreWest. On 4 March 1989, route 28 was converted to minibus operation with AEC Routemasters replaced by 28-seat Alexander bodied Mercedes-Benz midibuses leading to severe overcrowding and poor reliability.

In June 2013, route 28 was included in the sale of First London's Atlas Road garage to Tower Transit.

On 1 May 2021, route 28 was passed on to London United from Wandsworth and Stamford Brook garages.

On 29 January 2022, route 28 was transferred to Westbourne Park garage.

On 24 July 2023, the route was temporarily withdrawn between Wandsworth Bridge and Southside Wandsworth until 2 October 2023 due to the closure of Wandsworth Bridge.

== Current route ==
Route 28 operates via these primary locations:

- Southside Wandsworth
- Wandsworth Town station
- Wandsworth Bridge
- Imperial Wharf station
- Fulham Broadway station
- West Kensington station
- Kensington (Olympia) station
- Hammersmith Road
- Kensington High Street
- High Street Kensington station
- Kensington Palace North
- Notting Hill Gate station
- Portobello Market
- Westbourne Park station
- Harrow Road Prince of Wales Hotel
- Kensal Rise station
