= Brondesbury Park railway station =

London Overground station

Brondesbury Park
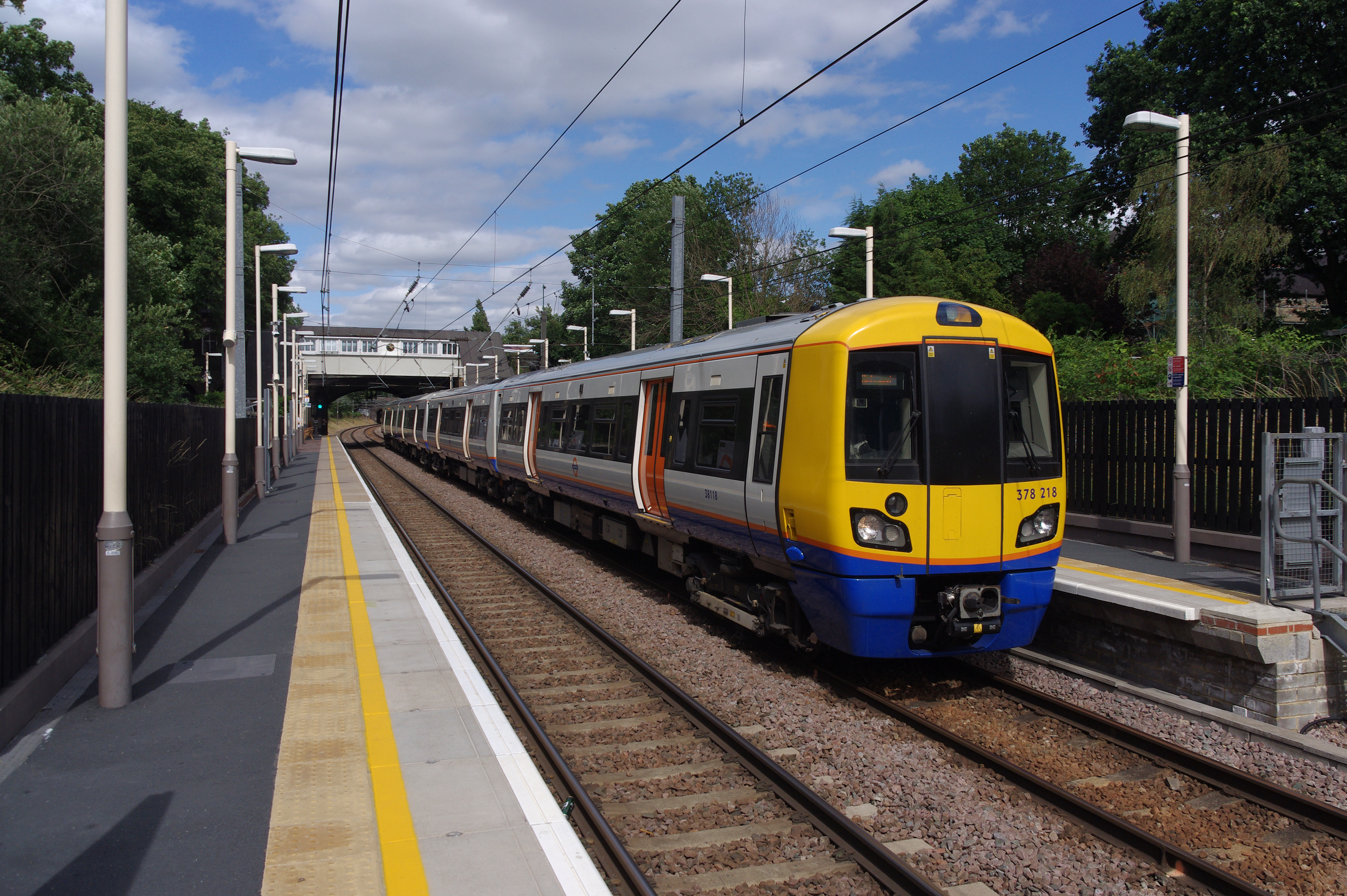
- Interactive map of Brondesbury Park

General information
- Location: Brondesbury Park
- Local authority: London Borough of Brent
- Managed by: London Overground
- Owner: Network Rail
- Station code: BSP
- DfT category: E
- Number of platforms: 2
- Fare zone: 2

National Rail annual entry and exit
- 2020–21: ▼0.393 million
- 2021–22: ▲0.767 million
- 2022–23: ▲0.894 million
- 2023–24: ▲1.014 million
- 2024–25: ▲1.067 million

Railway companies
- Original company: London and North Western Railway
- Pre-grouping: London and North Western Railway
- Post-grouping: London, Midland and Scottish Railway

Key dates
- 1 June 1908: Opened

Other information
- External links: Departures; Facilities
- Coordinates: 51.5407°N 0.2103°W

Brondesbury Park is a station on the Mildmay line of the London Overground, located in Brondesbury Park in the London Borough of Brent. It is situated in London fare zone 2 and is close to the Queen's Park area.

== History ==
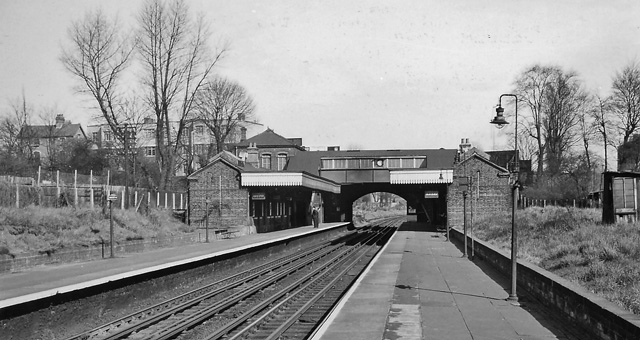
Brondesbury Park Station in 1961

The Hampstead Junction Railway route between Willesden Junction (Low Level) and Camden Road (via Gospel Oak) opened in 1860, but at first there were no stations west of Brondesbury. The line was absorbed by the London and North Western Railway in 1867, but it was not until 1 June 1908 that a station at Brondesbury Park was opened.

== Services ==
All services at Brondesbury Park are operated by London Overground as part of the Mildmay line using Class 378 EMUs.

The typical off-peak service in trains per hour is:

- 8 tph to Stratford via Camden Road
- 4 tph to Richmond
- 4 tph to Clapham Junction

During the late evenings, the services to and from Clapham Junction do not operate.

Preceding station	London Overground	Following station
Kensal Rise towards Clapham Junction or Richmond	Mildmay line North London line	Brondesbury towards Stratford

== Connections ==
London Buses route 206 serves the station.
