= Kensal Green and Harlesden railway station =

Former railway station in England

Coordinates: 51.5328°N 0.2341°W

Kensal Green & Harlesden was a railway station on the North London Line. It was opened by Hampstead Junction Railway in 1861, and closed in 1873. On closure, it was replaced by Kensal Rise railway station.
