= British Rail Class 378 =

Fleet of electric multiple units in England

British Rail Class 378 Capitalstar
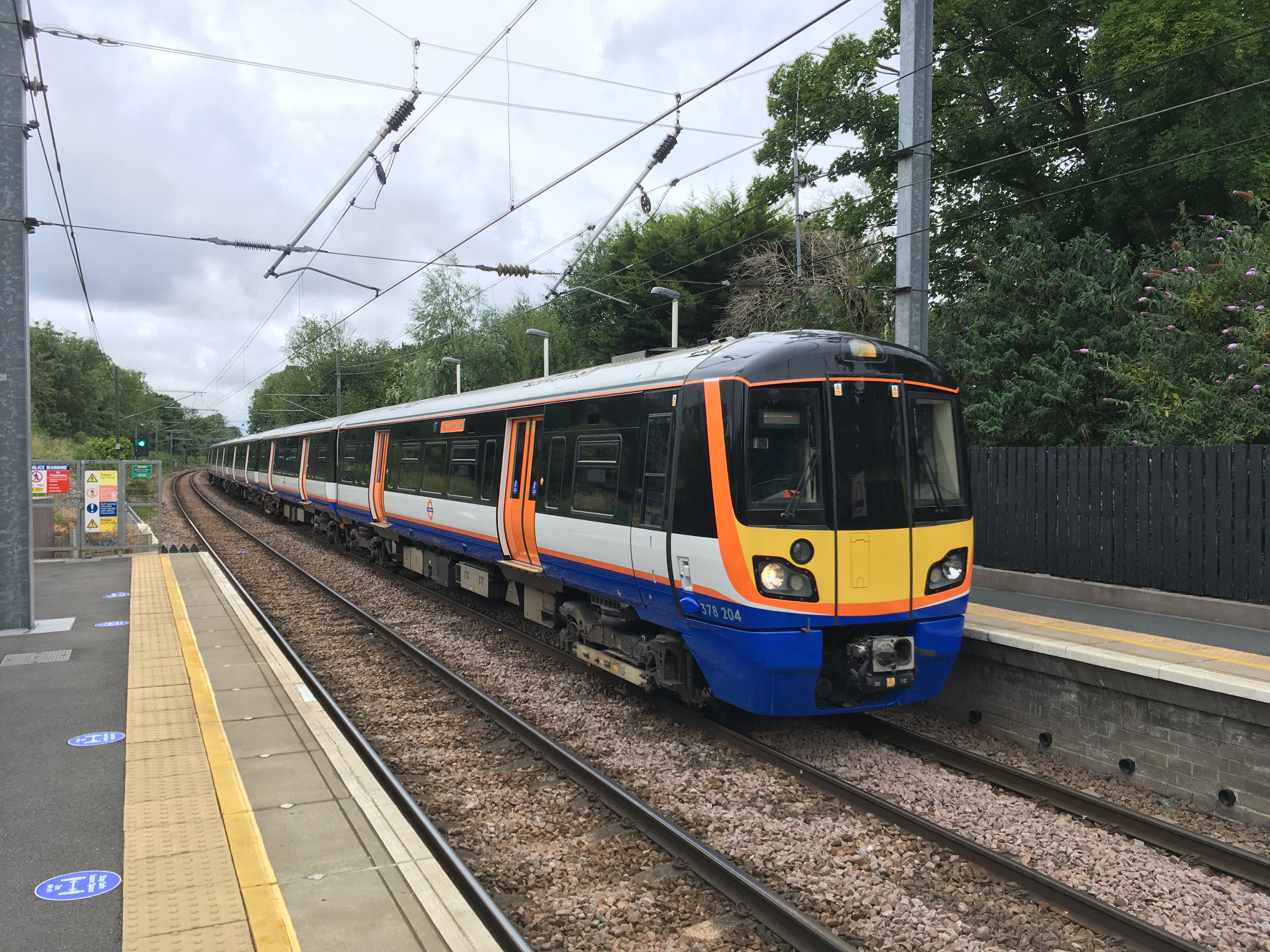
- London Overground Class 378 at Brondesbury Park

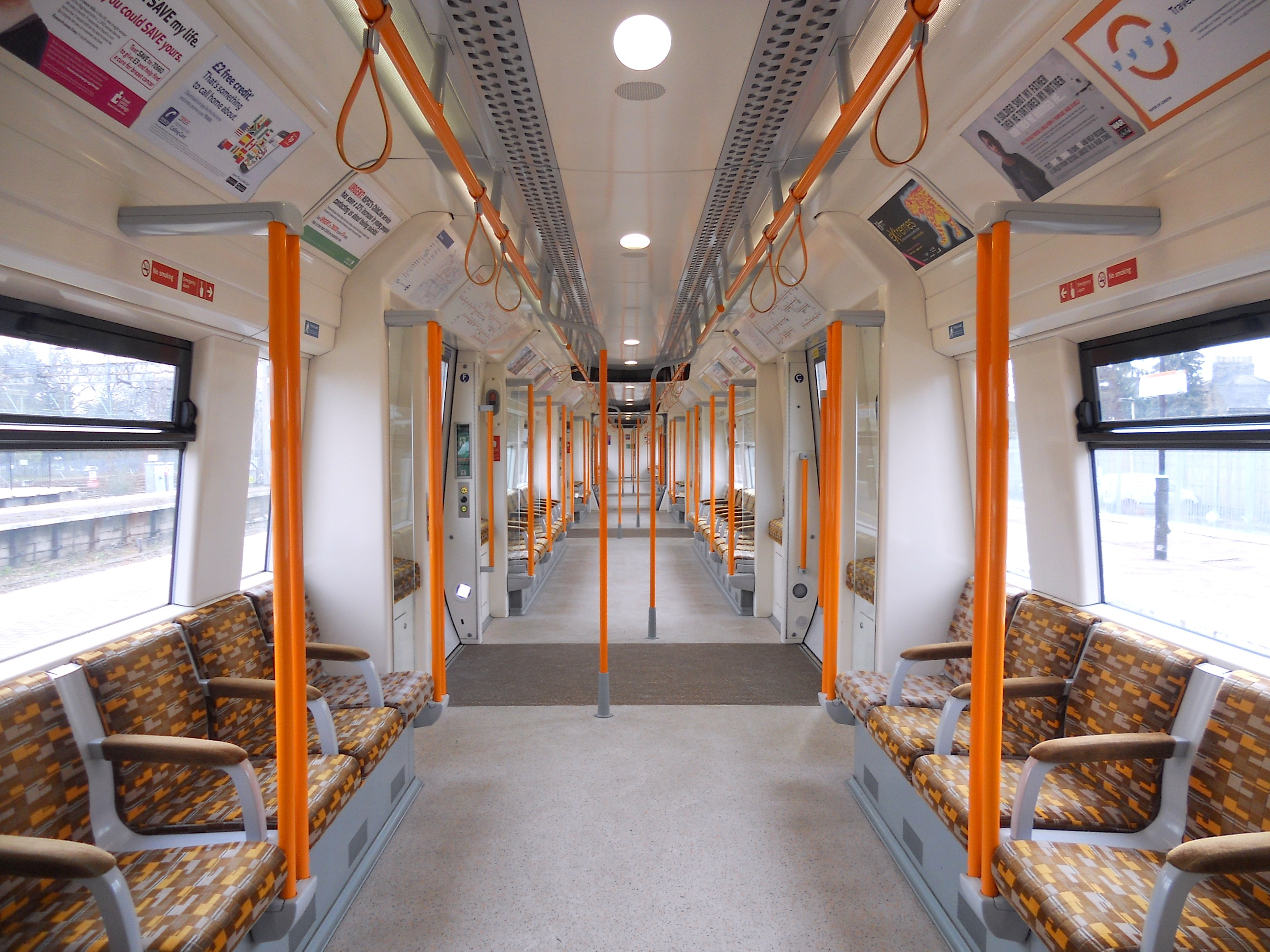
- The interior of a Class 378 unit
- In service: 29 July 2009 – present
- Manufacturer: Bombardier Transportation
- Built at: Derby Litchurch Lane Works
- Family name: Electrostar
- Replaced: Class 172; Class 313; Class 508; A60/A62 Stock
- Constructed: 2008–2011; (plus additional vehicles in 2015)
- Number built: 57
- Successor: Class 710 (Note: Gospel Oak to Barking lines.)
- Formation: Class 378/1: DMS-MS-TS-MS-DMS; Class 378/2: DMS-MS-PTS-MS-DMS
- Fleet numbers: 378135–378154; 378201–378224; 378225–378234; 378255–378257
- Capacity: 1,178 total; (186 fixed seats, 86 tip-up seats, and up to 906 standees)
- Owner: Transport for London
- Operator: London Overground
- Lines served: Mildmay line; Windrush line; Lioness line

Specifications
- Car body construction: Welded aluminium body with steel cab ends
- Train length: 101.350 m (332 ft 6.2 in)
- Car length: DMOS vehs.: 19.995 m (65 ft 7.2 in); Others: 19.660 m (64 ft 6.0 in)
- Width: 2.800 m (9 ft 2.2 in)
- Height: 3.774 m (12 ft 4.6 in)
- Floor height: 1.151 m (3 ft 9.3 in)
- Doors: Double-leaf pocket sliding, each 1.5 m (4 ft 11 in) wide (2 per side per car)
- Wheel diameter: 840 mm (2 ft 9 in) (nominal)
- Wheelbase: Over bogies: 2.600 m (8 ft 6.4 in); Over bogie centres: 14.173 m (46 ft 6.0 in)
- Maximum speed: 75 mph (121 km/h)
- Weight: DMOS vehs.: 45.5 t (44.8 long tons; 50.2 short tons); MOS vehs.: 41.1 t (40.5 long tons; 45.3 short tons); PTOS vehs.: 39.9 t (39.3 long tons; 44.0 short tons); Total: 212.8 tonnes (209.4 long tons; 234.6 short tons)
- Steep gradient: 1 in 29
- Traction motors: 12 × 200 kW (270 hp)
- Power output: 2,400 kW (3,200 hp)
- Electric systems: 750 V DC third rail; 25 kV 50 Hz AC overhead (378/2 only)
- Current collection: Contact shoe (DC); Pantograph (AC) (378/2 only)
- UIC classification: 1A-Bo + 1A-Bo + 2-2 + Bo-1A + Bo-1A
- Bogies: Powered: Bombardier P3-25; Unpowered: Bombardier T3-25
- Braking systems: Electro-pneumatic (disc) and regenerative/rheostatic; (Knorr-Bremse EP2002)
- Safety systems: AWS; TPWS; Tripcock (378/2 only)
- Coupling system: Dellner 12
- Multiple working: Within class, and with Classes 375, 376, 377 and 379
- Seating: Longitudinal
- Track gauge: 1,435 mm (4 ft 8 1/2 in) standard gauge

Notes/references
- Sourced from and unless otherwise noted.

The British Rail Class 378 Capitalstar is an electric multiple unit passenger train specifically designed for the London Overground network. It is part of Bombardier Transportation's Electrostar family. A total of 57 five-car trains have been built, most of which were originally built as three- or four-car units.

The Class 378s were ordered in August 2006 in response to passenger dissatisfaction with existing mass-transit trains operated by Silverlink, such as the ageing fleet of Class 313. The procurement of a modern replacement was viewed as yielding better performance than the refurbishment of the existing units. Accordingly, a total of 57 Class 378s were manufactured at Bombardier's Derby site; the first example of which entered revenue service during July 2009. The type's introduction was roughly half a year later than originally planned, largely as a result of difficulties with multiple suppliers.

In design terms, the train is broadly similar to the Class 376 trains operated by Southeastern, featuring the same wider metro-style sliding pocket doors for more efficient boarding and alighting. However, it also has significant differences from the Class 376, such as fully longitudinal seating similar to that used on London Underground rolling stock to give more standing and less seating capacity and reduce overcrowding; the interior was optimised for the high-volume metro-style services being operated by London Overground.

== History ==
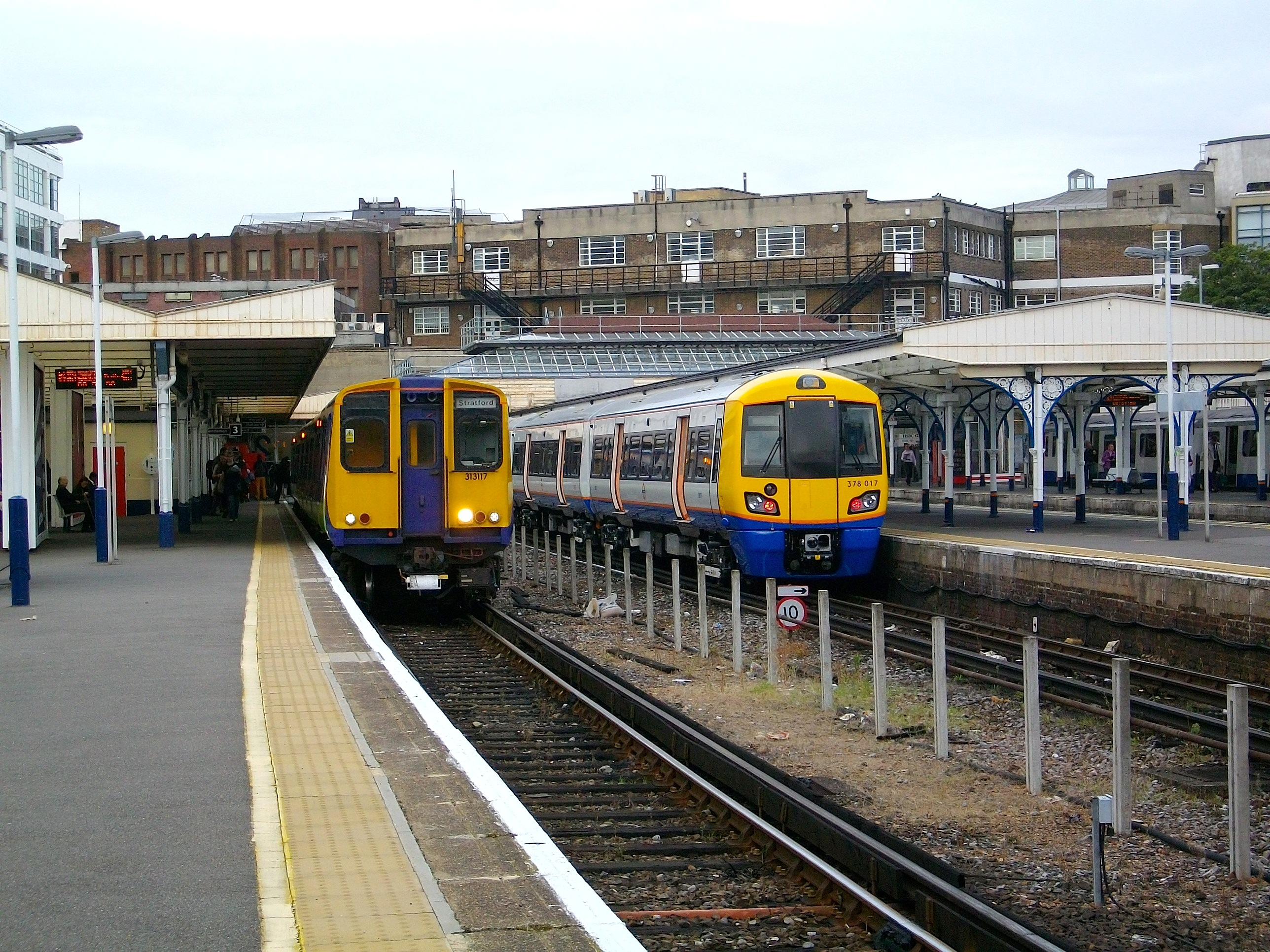
London Overground Class 313 and Class 378 side by side at Richmond

By the start of the twenty-first century, several types of rolling stock that had originally entered service multiple decades before were in operation across London. In particular, the Silverlink franchise on the North London line was frequently regarded by travellers as having offered a poor service, complaints centring around extremely congested trains and unreliable service. The Class 313 was in use for these services at this time; its interiors were of noticeably lower quality compared to that of newer trains and the trains themselves were viewed as unwelcoming to passengers, particularly during late hours. Officials at Transport for London (TfL) were motivated to improve the situation and decided on a modern replacement for the Class 313. Accordingly, they began to investigate various options for doing so.

In August 2006, it was announced that a contract worth £223 million had been signed between rolling-stock manufacturer Bombardier and TfL, under which an initial batch of 152 individual cars would be supplied, deliveries of which were to start in September 2008. The original contract contained an option to purchase additional cars, up to a total of 216. Maintenance arrangements were also included, involving the construction of a new depot near New Cross Gate station to perform heavy maintenance tasks upon this new fleet. The new fleet, designated Class 378, was manufactured by Bombardier at its facility in Derby.

In July 2007, TfL announced it had ordered a further 36 Capitalstar carriages for £36 million. The order comprised three additional four-car units for the East London Line, and 24 additional carriages to extend the original 3-car units for the North London Line into 4-car units, to be delivered in 2011.

On 16 September 2008, the first complete unit was unveiled and began testing on Bombardier's test track before being delivered for testing on the national network. On the first public unveiling of the Class 378, TfL announced that it had reached an agreement to procure a further three dual-voltage units, taking the total number to 57. These units were intended to enhance the fleet once the South London line was brought under London Overground's control.

In February 2013, approval was gained for the procurement of 57 additional vehicles, allowing the whole Class 378 fleet to be lengthened from four to five cars for greater capacity. At the time, TfL's business plan called for five-car services to begin on the East London Line from November 2014, while the rest of the electrified Overground network would follow by the end of 2015. In January 2016, TfL announced that all units were now in a five-car configuration.

TfL had originally purchased the fleet outright but, in 2007, it completed a sale and leaseback deal that saw ownership pass to QW Rail Leasing. The fifth cars were similarly transferred to QW in 2013, with both leases including an initial lease commitment until June 2027. In March 2023, TfL's finance committee was asked to approve plans to terminate these leases early so that the fleet could be repurchased by TfL, on the grounds that doing so would be cheaper and less risky than continuing the leases. As part of the request, it was stated that TfL's fleet strategy called for the Class 378 fleet to remain in service until it became life-expired in 2044. This purchase was completed in summer 2023, at a cost of £281m.

== Design and features ==
The Class 378 Capitalstar is a dual-voltage electric multiple-unit (EMU), designed to be supplied via either the 750 V DC third rail or the 25 kV 50 Hz AC overhead lines. It is a customised version of Bombardier's Electrostar family, aimed at the short-distance mass-transit end of the market. Following completion of five-car upgrades in 2016, each unit is formed of a driving motor vehicle and an intermediate motor vehicle either side of an intermediate trailer. In Class 378/2 units, the intermediate trailer carries the pantograph and electrical transformer.

The interior of the train was designed to maximise passenger capacity. Traditional seating was eliminated and longitudinal seats adopted instead, along with wide areas around the doors to speed the entrance and exit of passengers. Furthermore, a significant portion of each car is intended for use by standing passengers, and thus have grabrails and other holding points for such passengers to steady themselves, broadly similar to a London Underground train. The trains lack toilets, as the whole NLL line takes a little more than one hour to traverse from end to end. In conjunction with the base internal configuration, the cars were outfitted with numerous modern amenities aimed at improving passenger comfort, such as air conditioning, real-time passenger information systems, wheelchair accessibility (including the facilitating of level access), and different seat moquette colours to highlight priority seating.

Detrainment device after deployment from the nose door. The spotlight above the headlight cluster on the non-driving side provides illumination for the area at the foot of the steps.

To facilitate safe use in the narrow single-bore tunnels on the East London Line, the units are provided with a detrainment device at each driver's cab in the form of folding stairs that deploy from the cab's nose door.

The train is equipped with sensors to detect how many people are in each coach, and automatically adjust how much energy is expended on heating a particular carriage based upon this capacity, among other intelligent management functions that are performed. External CCTV is displayed automatically on releasing the doors via an in-cab monitor, removing the need for Driver-Only Operation (DOO) equipment such as monitors/mirrors at platforms. A somewhat similar arrangement to this had already come into use on Southern's Electrostar units. Furthermore, in the event of a passenger operating an emergency alarm, the internal CCTV is automatically displayed on the in-cab monitor, allowing the driver to view the affected area of the train, while an intercom allows the driver to speak to the passenger.

== Operations ==
The Class 378 was originally intended to enter service in January 2009. This schedule was delayed by seven months as a consequence of the great recession of 2008, which had forced several suppliers into bankruptcy, resulting in a shortage of several components. This also affected delivery of the similar Class 377/5 units to First Capital Connect. As a result, the first Class 378 unit did not enter service until 29 July 2009.

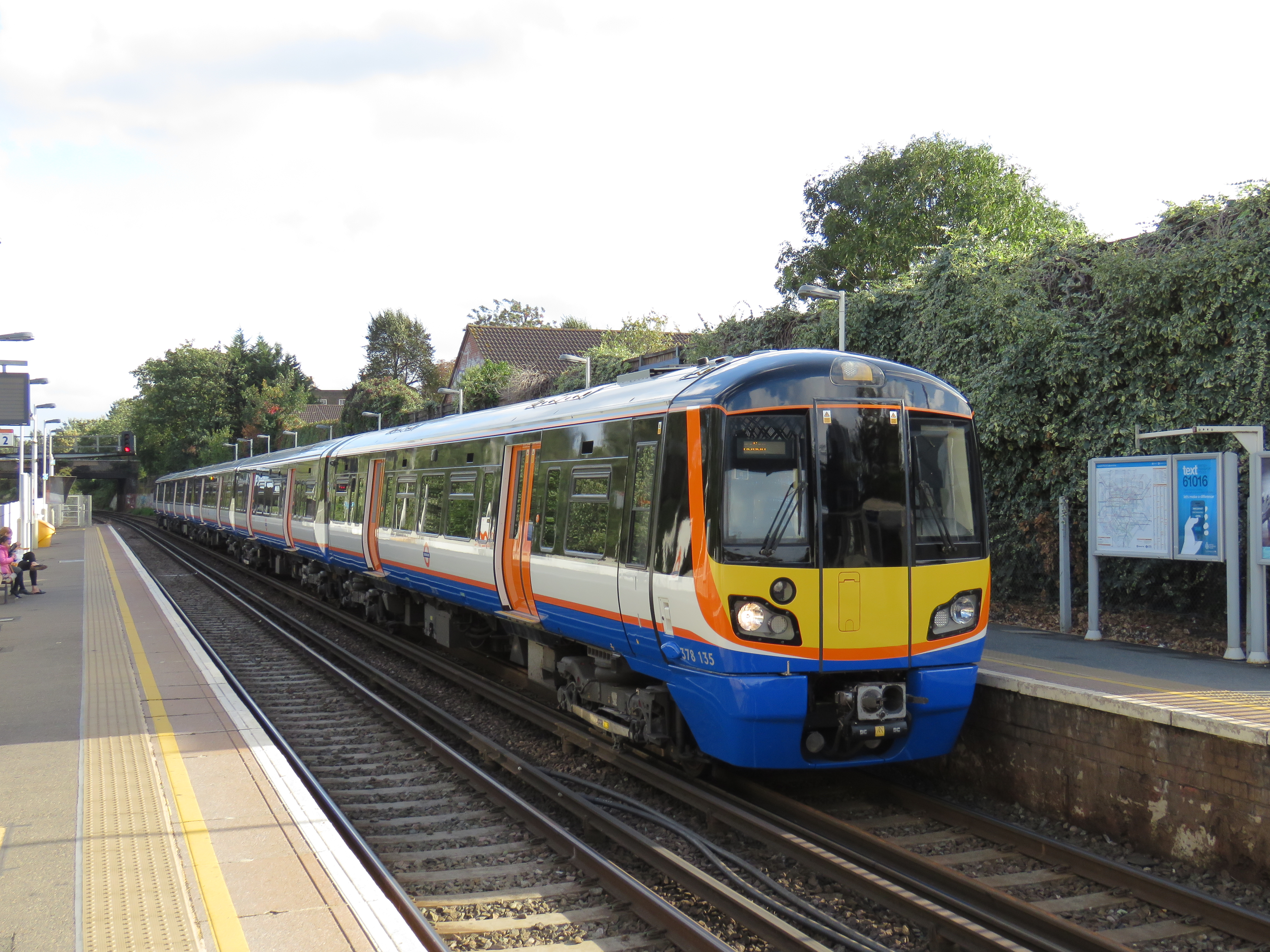
London Overground Class 378 at Wandsworth Road

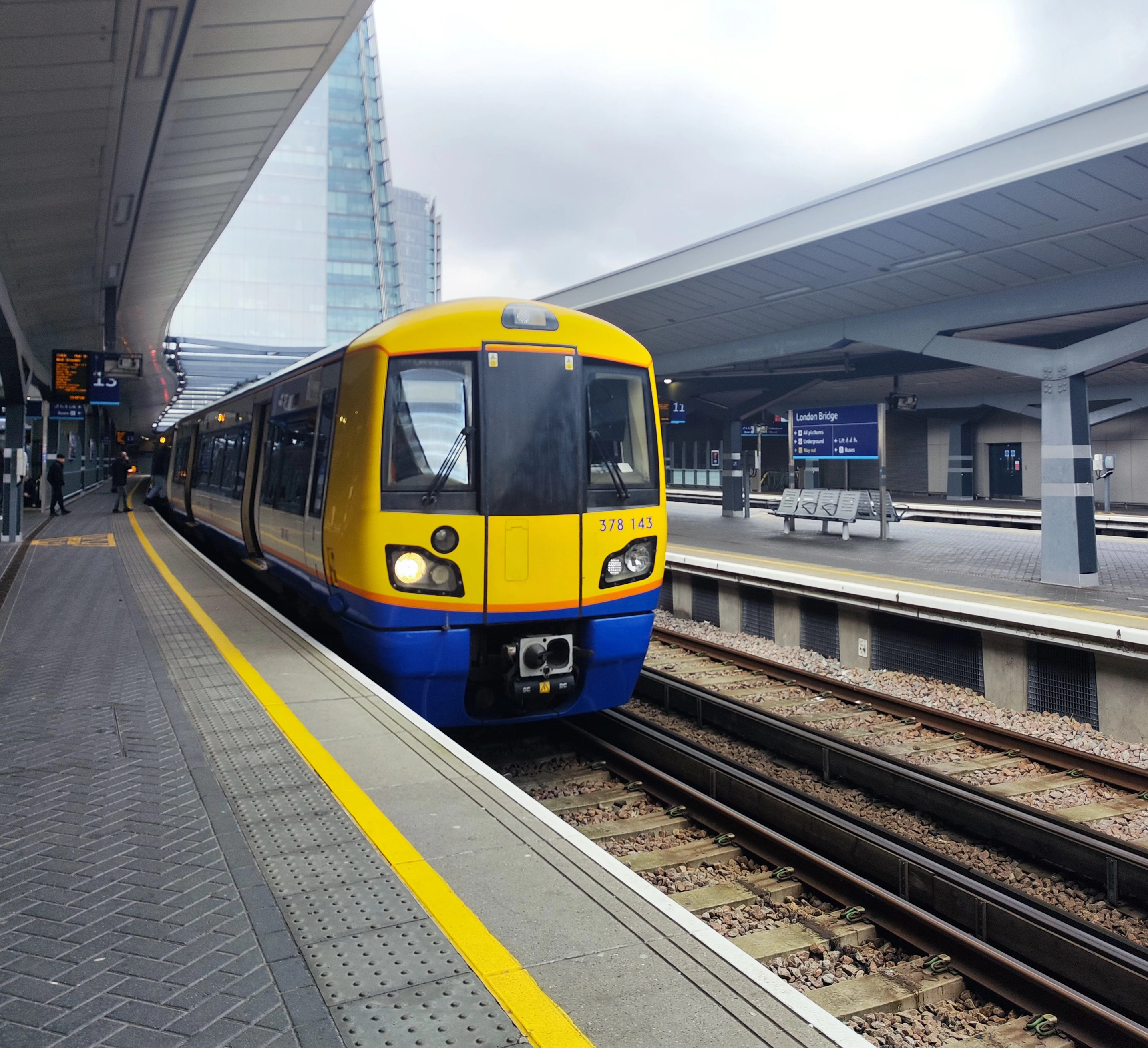
Class 378 at London Bridge

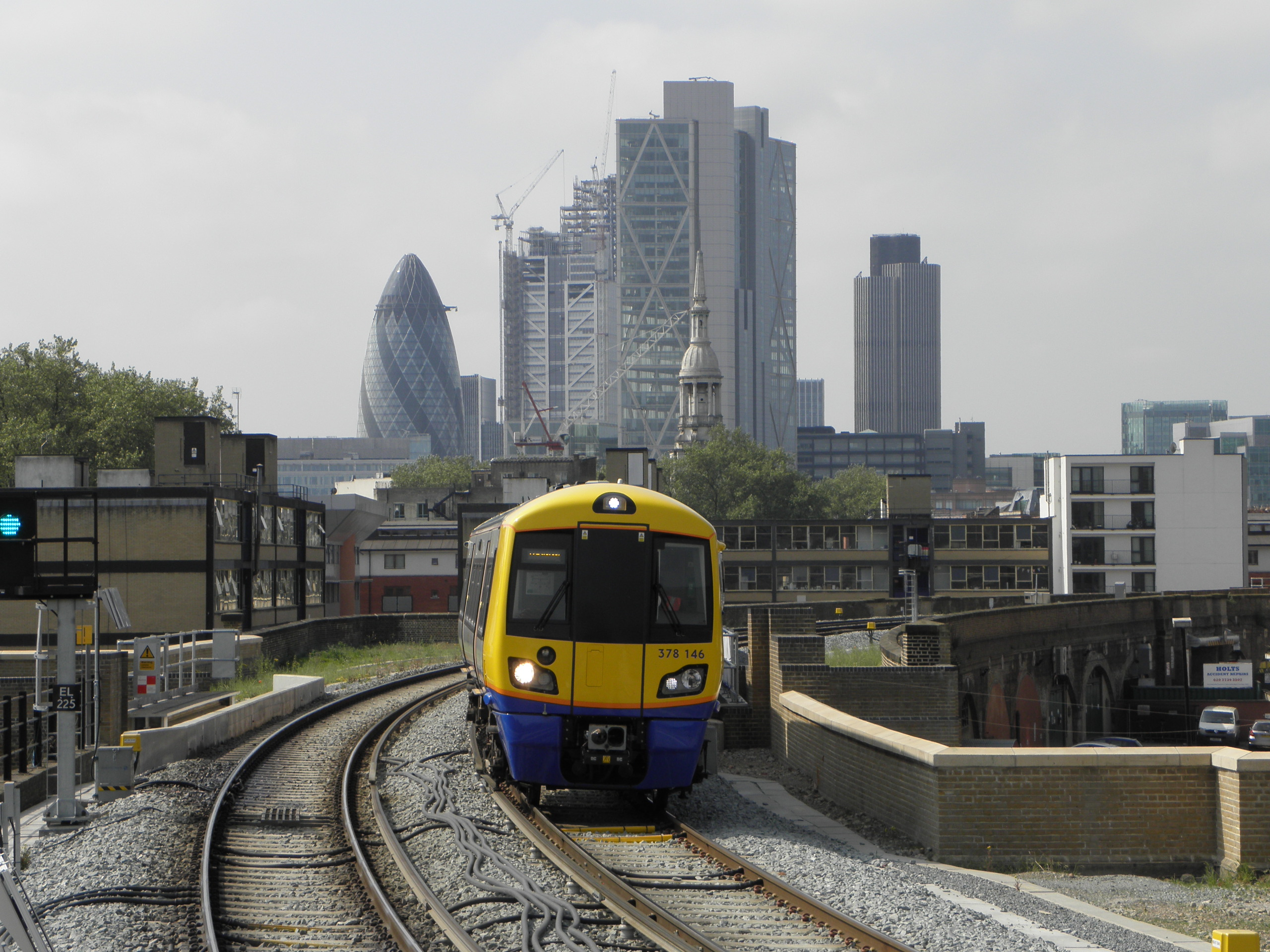
Class 378 approaching Hoxton, with City of London skyline beyond

During 2011, several Class 378s suffered unplanned shutdowns while operating along the North London Line. The cause was found to be harmonic interference generated by passing Class 92 locomotives, which occasionally traverse the line for freight movements. The problem was permanently resolved after Bombardier altered the interference tolerance settings.

During January 2016, TfL announced the completion for work to extend all 57 units into a five-car configuration. In December 2018, unit 378232 was shortened back to four cars to run on the Gospel Oak to Barking line while delays to delivery of Class 710 were resolved. 378206 and 378209 were also shortened to four carriages to work as temporary cover while the diesel-powered Class 172s were withdrawn.

In July 2015, London Overground announced an order for 45 new Class 710 units, some of which would displace the Class 378s in use on the Watford DC line. These displaced units will then be cascaded to strengthen services on the other lines the units are used on.

In 2018, London Overground began a programme to refresh the Class 378 fleet, giving them a livery and moquette similar to that of the newer Class 710 fleet. This refurbishment programme was done at Alstom's Widnes facility, but will move to Ilford in October 2026 following Alstom's announcement of repurposing the site.

During January 2018, the Class 378 fleet was temporarily withdrawn from service for urgent safety inspections after one unit suffered a failed brake caliper.

== Fleet ==
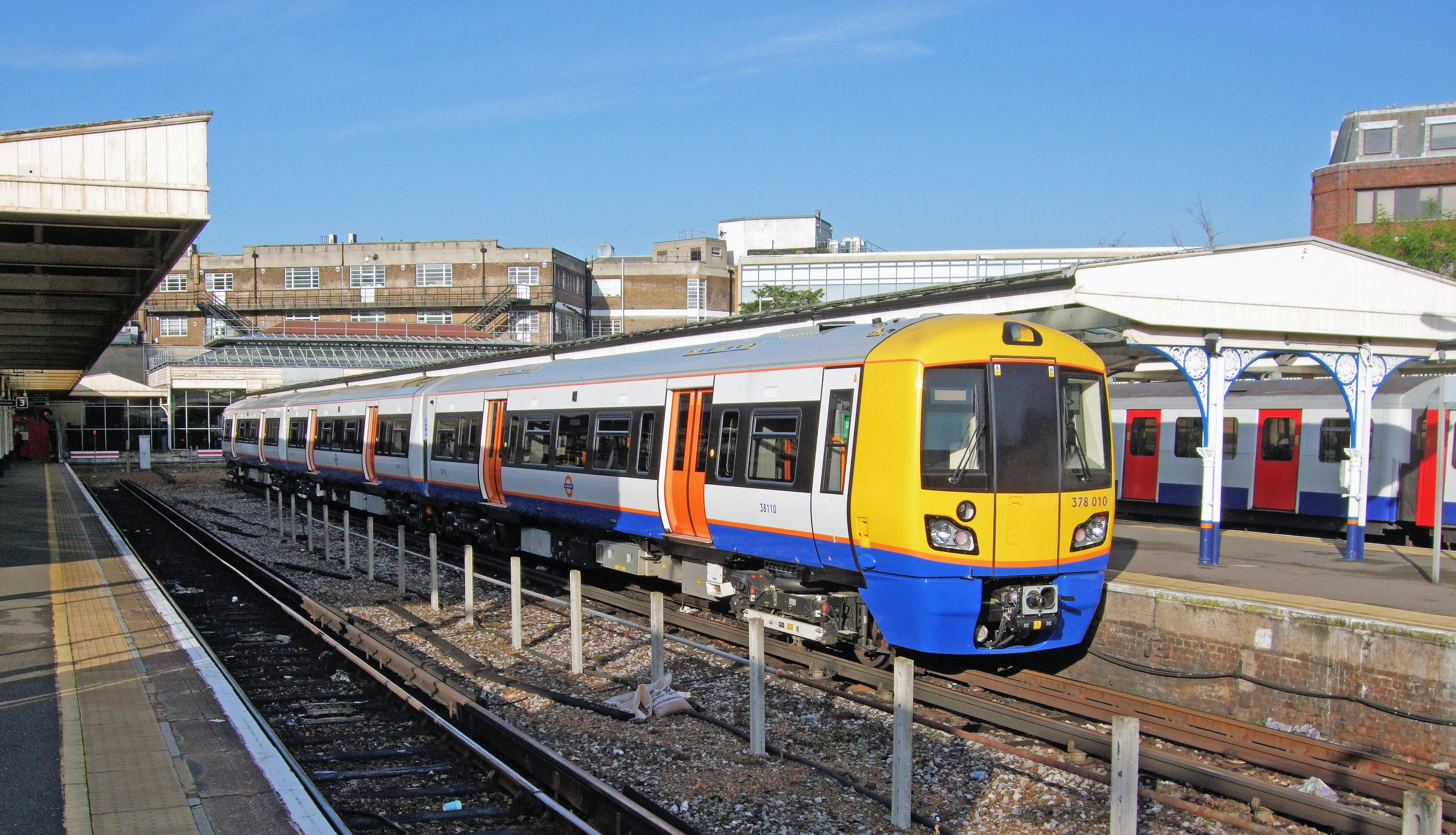
Class 378 awaiting departure at Richmond

The Class 378 fleet is currently formed of two separate subclasses, DC-only 378/1 and dual-voltage (AC and DC) Class 378/2:

- Class 378/1 – 20 four-car units were ordered. These units operate services on the extended East London Line, and are 750 V DC only. These trains, which are designated Class 378/1, replaced the A60/A62 Stock previously used on the line. They entered service on 27 April 2010, on the preview service between Dalston Junction and New Cross / New Cross Gate. The service was extended to Crystal Palace and West Croydon on 23 May 2010. In common with all trains in the Electrostar family, these DC-only 378/1 units have a recessed roof space for the fitting of a pantograph and other equipment for dual-voltage working in the future if necessary. The Southern services on the South London line were withdrawn in 2012 and replaced by a new London Overground service operated using new air-conditioned 4-car Class 378 units.
- Class 378/2 – 37 dual-voltage four-car units ordered for the North London, West London, Watford DC, East London lines. These units have dual-voltage capability, taking current at 25 kV AC from overhead wires or 750 V DC from third rail. These trains replaced the Class 313 and Class 508 units in 2010. The first 24 units were originally three-car units designated Class 378/0 (378001-378024) and were redesignated Class 378/2 (renumbered 378201–378224) as each unit received its additional carriage in late 2010. The remaining 13 units (378225-378234 and 378255–378257) were built as four-car Class 378/2s from the outset.

Units:
| Class | Operator | Qty. | Year built | Cars | Unit nos. | Routes | Notes |
|---|---|---|---|---|---|---|---|
| 378/1 | London Overground | 20 | 2009–2010 | 5 | 378135–378154 | Windrush line | Third-rail only. |
| 378/2 | London Overground | 24 | 2008–2010 | 5 | 378201–378224 | Mildmay line; Windrush line; Lioness line | Dual-voltage units. Originally built as three-car Class 378/0 (378001–378024). |
| 378/2 | London Overground | 13 | 2010–2011 | 5 | 378225–378234, 378255–378257 | Mildmay line; Windrush line; Lioness line | Dual-voltage units. |

=== Illustration ===
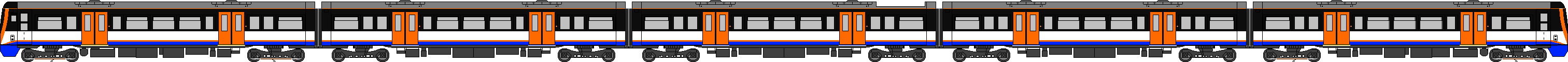
Illustration of a London Overground Class 378/1 unit

=== Named units ===
Named units are as follows:

- 378135: Daks Hamilton
- 378136: Transport for London
- 378204: Professor Sir Peter Hall
- 378205: Every Story Matters #LondonForEveryone (also carries a special livery to commemorate the LGBTQ+ community)
- 378211: Gary Hunter
- 378232: Jeff Langston
- 378233: Ian Brown CBE

== See also ==
- British Rail Class 376
