= HKW =

HKW may refer to:

- HKW Chemnitz-Nord, a power station in Saxony, Germany
- Haus der Kulturen der Welt, a venue in Berlin, Germany
- Hackney Wick railway station, London, England
- Hazarat Karanwala railway station, Pakistan
