= Hackney Wick railway station =

Railway station in London, England

Hackney Wick
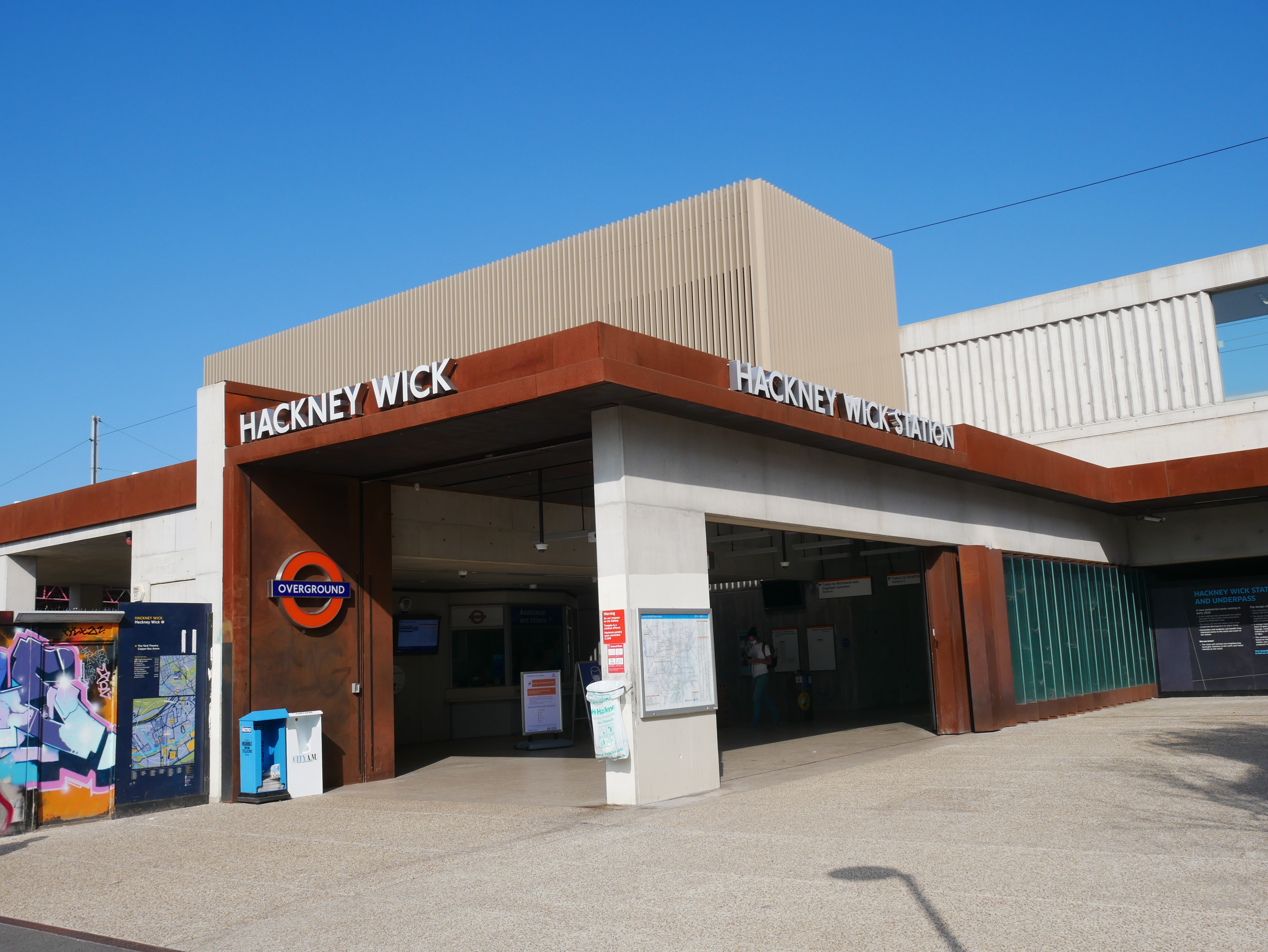
- Interactive map of Hackney Wick

General information
- Location: Hackney Wick
- Local authority: London Borough of Hackney
- Managed by: London Overground
- Owner: Network Rail
- Station code: HKW
- DfT category: E
- Number of platforms: 2
- Accessible: Yes
- Fare zone: 2

National Rail annual entry and exit
- 2020–21: ▼0.950 million
- Interchange: ▼457
- 2021–22: ▲2.341 million
- Interchange: ▲649
- 2022–23: ▲3.082 million
- Interchange: ▲1,629
- 2023–24: ▲4.180 million
- Interchange: ▲5,371
- 2024–25: ▲4.211 million
- Interchange: ▼1

Key dates
- 12 May 1980: Opened
- 2017: Remodelled

Other information
- External links: Departures; Facilities
- Coordinates: 51.543417°N 0.024389°W

Hackney Wick is a station on the Mildmay line of the London Overground, located in the district of Hackney Wick, East London. Situated in London fare zone 2, the station was opened on 12 May 1980 by British Rail as part of the Crosstown Linkline service between North Woolwich and Camden Road stations. Between Spring 2017 and May 2018, the station was rebuilt and modernised, including replacement of the footbridge by a subway. The new subway links the two platforms as well as providing a cycle and pedestrian link between Hackney and Tower Hamlets.

== History ==
The station opened on 12 May 1980 by British Rail as part of the Crosstown Linkline service. The area had been served by Victoria Park railway station, a short distance to the west, on the Broad Street–Poplar branch of the North London Railway from 1856 to 1943.

As part of the programme to introduce four-car trains on the London Overground network, the North London line between Gospel Oak and Stratford closed in February 2010; reopening 1 June 2010. This was to enable the installation of a new signalling system and the extension of 30 platforms. Engineering work continued to June 2011, during which reduced services operated and Sunday services were suspended.

The typical service at the station is 4 trains per hour westbound to Richmond via Hackney Central, Highbury & Islington, Camden Road and Willesden Junction, 2 trains per hour to Clapham Junction, and 6 trains per hour eastbound to Stratford.

Until 9 December 2006, when the line from Stratford to North Woolwich was closed to be converted to a Docklands Light Railway line, the eastbound service ran to North Woolwich calling at Stratford, West Ham, Canning Town, Custom House and Silvertown & London City Airport.

Hackney Wick station was a key transport point for the 2012 Summer Olympics as it is situated 100 m (330 ft) from the western periphery of the Olympic Park. However, due to potential overcrowding, TfL announced that westbound trains would not stop at this station for the duration of the Games.

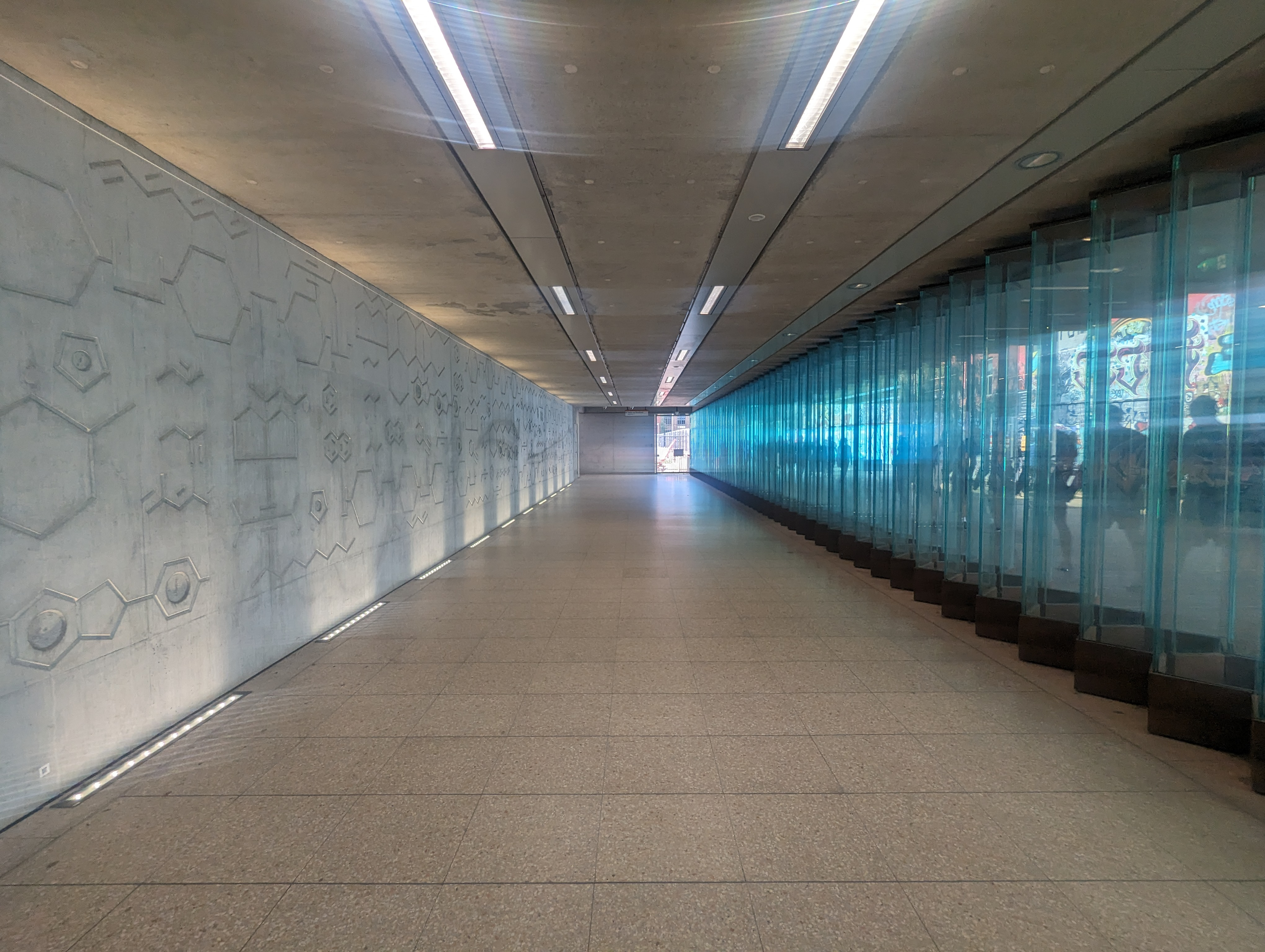
Ground floor corridor at Hackney Wick Station container debossed concrete representations of selected chemical compounds and glass wall representing chemical symbols

Hackney Wick is one of four stations located around the park, along with Stratford, Stratford International and Pudding Mill Lane.

As part of the London 2012 Olympic legacy Wendy Hardie and Adam Brown undertook an art architecture collaboration to "refine the architecture and to make it more place specific and sensitive to its creative context". The local historical industries provided inspiration, notably innovation in chemistry, Hackney Cut canal and Lee Navigation. The result opened in mid 2018 with a number of notable elements. These include a wall formed of a continuous chain of extruded glass hexagons representing molecular structure of chemical compounds that were invented in Hackney Wick including the world's first plastic, Cellulose nitrate (patented as Parkesine). The glass wall is supported by weathered steel hexagon shoes that are inspired by the rusty sheet piled retaining walls and hand mechanised lock gates found along the nearby waterways. In addition the concrete also depicts chemical compounds using debossed abstracted notations representing Petroleum, Cellulose nitrate and Shellac as well as Meldola blue and Primuline which were important compounds of the dye industry.

At 00:54 on 21 March 2019, two men were fatally electrocuted after climbing a wagon of a freight train stopped adjacent to Hackney Wick station. A coroner's report found that the men used a hole in a chain link fence to access the railway, and that fences in the area of the incident had not been inspected since 2016. The report also identified a number of failures in Network Rail's inspection regime.

== Services ==
Hackney Wick currently has the following services on the Mildmay line of the London Overground, which are operated by Class 378 Capitalstar trainsets in off-peak.

- 8tph to Stratford
- 4tph to Richmond
- 4tph to Clapham Junction

== Buses ==
London Buses routes 276 and 488 serves the station with London Buses route 339 serving the station indirectly on White Post Lane.

| Preceding station | London Overground | Following station |
|---|---|---|
| Homerton towards Clapham Junction or Richmond | Mildmay line North London line | Stratford Terminus |
