= Dalston Kingsland railway station =

London Overground station

Dalston Kingsland
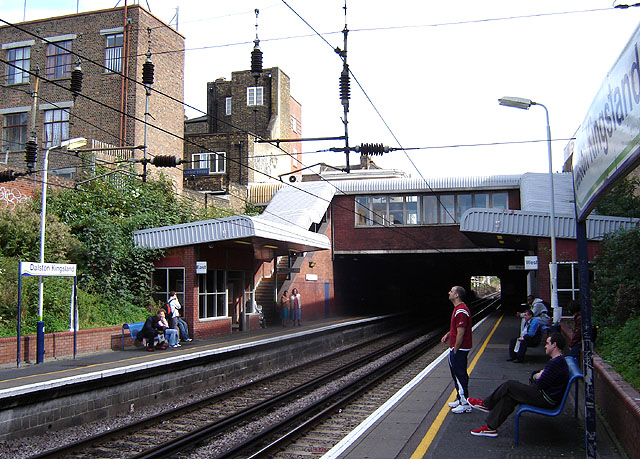
- The station in 2005
- Interactive map of Dalston Kingsland

General information
- Location: Dalston
- Local authority: Hackney
- Grid reference: TQ335850
- Managed by: London Overground
- Owner: Network Rail
- Station code: DLK
- DfT category: D
- Number of platforms: 2
- Fare zone: 2
- OSI: Dalston Junction 3 or 4 mins walk away

National Rail annual entry and exit
- 2020–21: ▼2.130 million
- 2021–22: ▲4.090 million
- 2022–23: ▲4.564 million
- 2023–24: ▲5.134 million
- 2024–25: ▲5.309 million

Railway companies
- Original company: North London Railway

Key dates
- 9 November 1850: Opened as Kingsland
- 1 November 1865: Closed
- 16 May 1983: Reopened as Dalston Kingsland

Other information
- External links: Departures; Facilities
- Coordinates: 51.5482°N 0.0763°W

Dalston Kingsland is a station on the Mildmay line of the London Overground, located on the western side of Kingsland High Street in the Dalston area of the London Borough of Hackney. Situated in London fare zone 2, the station straddles the boundary with the London Borough of Islington, with part of the platforms falling within Islington. The station is located opposite Ridley Road Market. Ticket barriers are in operation.

Kingsland railway station was opened on the site in 1850. It was closed and replaced by Dalston Junction station, approximately 250 metres (820 ft) walk away, in 1865. The current station was opened by British Rail in 1983. There is now an official out-of-station interchange with Dalston Junction, which is served by the Windrush line of the London Overground.

== History ==
A station was first opened on the site on 9 November 1850 by the North London Railway, formerly the East and West India Docks and Birmingham Junction Railway. It closed on 1 November 1865 when an extension was built to Broad Street in the City of London and a triangular junction was installed which joined the existing tracks to the east and west of the station. A new Dalston Junction station was opened at the southern tip of the junction and it replaced Kingsland station. The station was rebuilt and reopened on 16 May 1983 as part of the Crosstown Linkline service. The station replaced Dalston Junction when it closed in 1986, along with the rest of the line to Broad Street.

In August 2002 a potentially serious railway accident was avoided near Dalston Kingsland when a passenger train was inadvertently diverted on to the goods line during emergency signalling. When the passenger train was reversing to its correct path a following goods train almost ran into it.

== Present day ==
Dalston Junction reopened on 27 April 2010 on the London Overground East London line extension, with interchange permitted between it and Dalston Kingsland. The western curve of the junction was relaid for the East London line going to Highbury & Islington station; the site of the eastern curve is covered by the Dalston Eastern Curve Garden and the car park of Kingsland shopping centre.

As part of TfL's Overground improvement programme, plans have been approved to redevelop the station. Aside from increasing the number of entry and exit gates, the changes are largely cosmetic and do not make any provision for step-free access.

Plans have been approved to redevelop the "Peacocks" building immediately adjacent to the station into a 15-storey tower block.

== Services ==
As part of the programme to introduce four-car trains on the London Overground network, the North London line between Gospel Oak and Stratford closed in February 2010, reopening on 1 June 2010. The closure was to enable the installation of a new signalling system and the extension of 30 platforms. Engineering work continued until May 2011, during which reduced services operated and Sunday services were suspended.

Typical off-peak frequency at the station is four trains per hour westbound to Richmond via Highbury & Islington, Camden Road and Willesden Junction; four trains per hour westbound to Clapham Junction; and eight trains per hour eastbound to Stratford. However, service intervals vary from about seven minutes during peak times to 30 minutes on Sundays

At Dalston Kingsland station the North London line (NLL) was powered by both 25 kV overhead AC and 750 V third-rail DC systems and was the change-over point between current collection by pantographs and by shoes for passenger trains that are dual-system Class 378 electric multiple units (EMUs). For reliability, time-saving, and as part of the NLL upgrade, the third rail has now been removed and overhead cables power the North London line between Stratford and Acton Central.

== Gallery ==
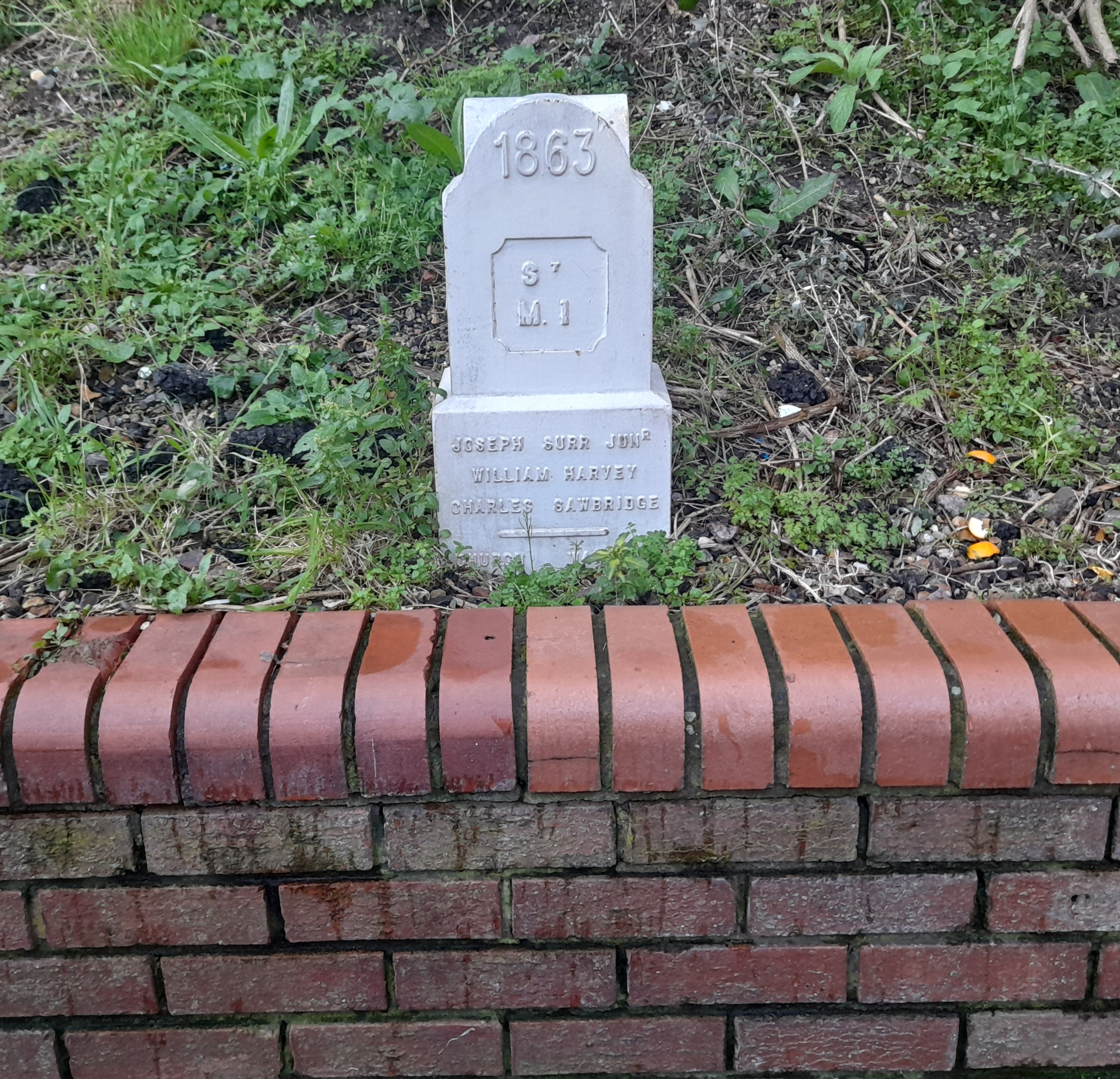
St Mathias Stoke Newington 1863 cast iron boundary marker post

1863 cast iron boundary marker post at far end of Westbound platform believed to be for the St Mathias Stoke Newington parish formed in 1849. "Joseph Surr junr. William Harvey, Charles Sawbridge, Church Wardens" inscribed on both sides.

== Connections ==
London Buses routes 67, 76, 149, 243 and 488 serve the station.

Preceding station	London Overground	Following station
Canonbury towards Clapham Junction or Richmond	Mildmay line North London line and West London line	Hackney Central towards Stratford
Disused railways
Canonbury	Eastern Region of British Railways Watford DC Line	London Liverpool Street
