= Caledonian Road & Barnsbury railway station =

London Overground station

Caledonian Road & Barnsbury
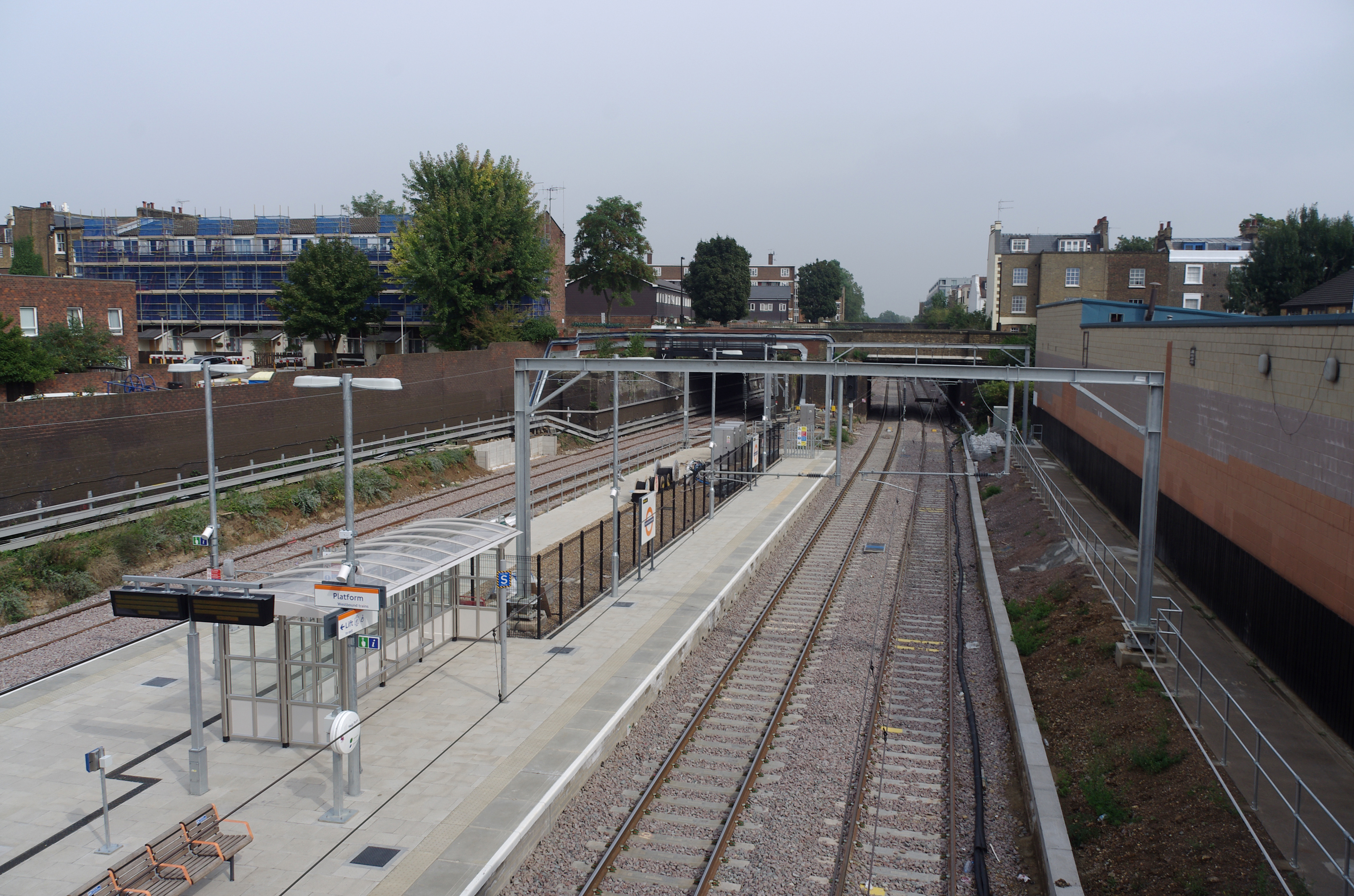
- Caledonian Road & Barnsbury
- Interactive map of Caledonian Road & Barnsbury

General information
- Location: Barnsbury
- Local authority: London Borough of Islington
- Managed by: London Overground
- Owner: Network Rail
- Station code: CIR
- DfT category: E
- Number of platforms: 2
- Accessible: Yes
- Fare zone: 2

National Rail annual entry and exit
- 2020–21: ▼0.599 million
- 2021–22: ▲1.161 million
- 2022–23: ▲1.328 million
- 2023–24: ▲1.538 million
- 2024–25: ▲1.567 million

Key dates
- 10 June 1852: Opened as Caledonian Road
- 21 November 1870: relocated east, renamed Barnsbury
- 1893: renamed Caledonian Road & Barnsbury

Other information
- External links: Departures; Facilities
- Coordinates: 51.5432°N 0.1145°W

Caledonian Road & Barnsbury is a station on the Mildmay line of the London Overground, located in the London Borough of Islington in north London.

The station is situated in London fare zone 2. Caledonian Road tube station on the Piccadilly line of the London Underground is located a 660-metre (2,170 ft) walk away; however transferring between the two stations is not considered a out-of-station interchange in TfL's fare system.

== History ==
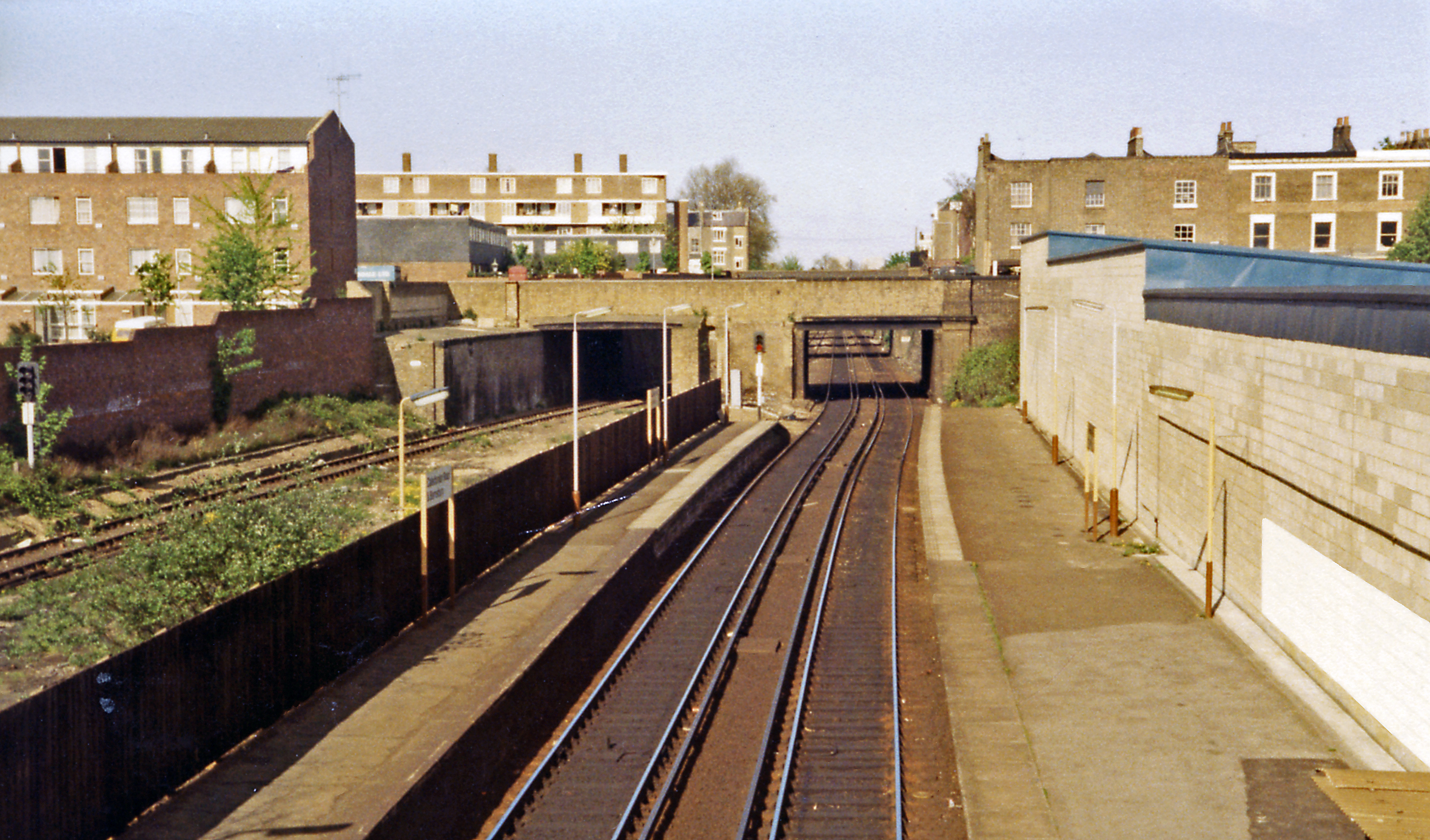
Caledonian Road & Barnsbury station in 1984 before the new platform

The station opened in 1870 as "Barnsbury" replacing the 1852 Caledonian Road station which was slightly west of the present site. Barnsbury was renamed "Caledonian Road & Barnsbury" in 1893.

Between 14 May 1979 and 11 May 1985 the station was served by the Crosstown Linkline diesel multiple unit service between Camden Road and North Woolwich.

To allow four-car trains to run on the London Overground network, the North London line between Gospel Oak and Stratford closed in February 2010, and reopened 1 June that year, in order for a new signalling system to be installed and 30 platforms to be extended. After the reopening the work continued until May 2011 with a reduced service and none on Sundays.

== Design ==
The station entrance on Offord Street leads to the old westbound platform (until February 2010) from which a footbridge gives access to the newer island platforms, numbered 2 and 3, probably to distinguish them from the old platform 1. There is a footpath, with Oyster readers, from Caledonian Road to the entrance.

== Location ==
London Buses routes 17, 91, 274 and night route N91 serve the station.

== Services ==
The typical off-peak weekday, Saturday and Sunday service at the station in trains per hour is

- 4 westbound to Richmond
- 4 westbound to Clapham Junction
- 8 eastbound to Stratford

Preceding station	London Overground	Following station
Camden Road towards Clapham Junction or Richmond	Mildmay line North London line and West London line	Highbury & Islington towards Stratford
