= Canonbury railway station =

London Overground station in the London Borough of Islington

Canonbury
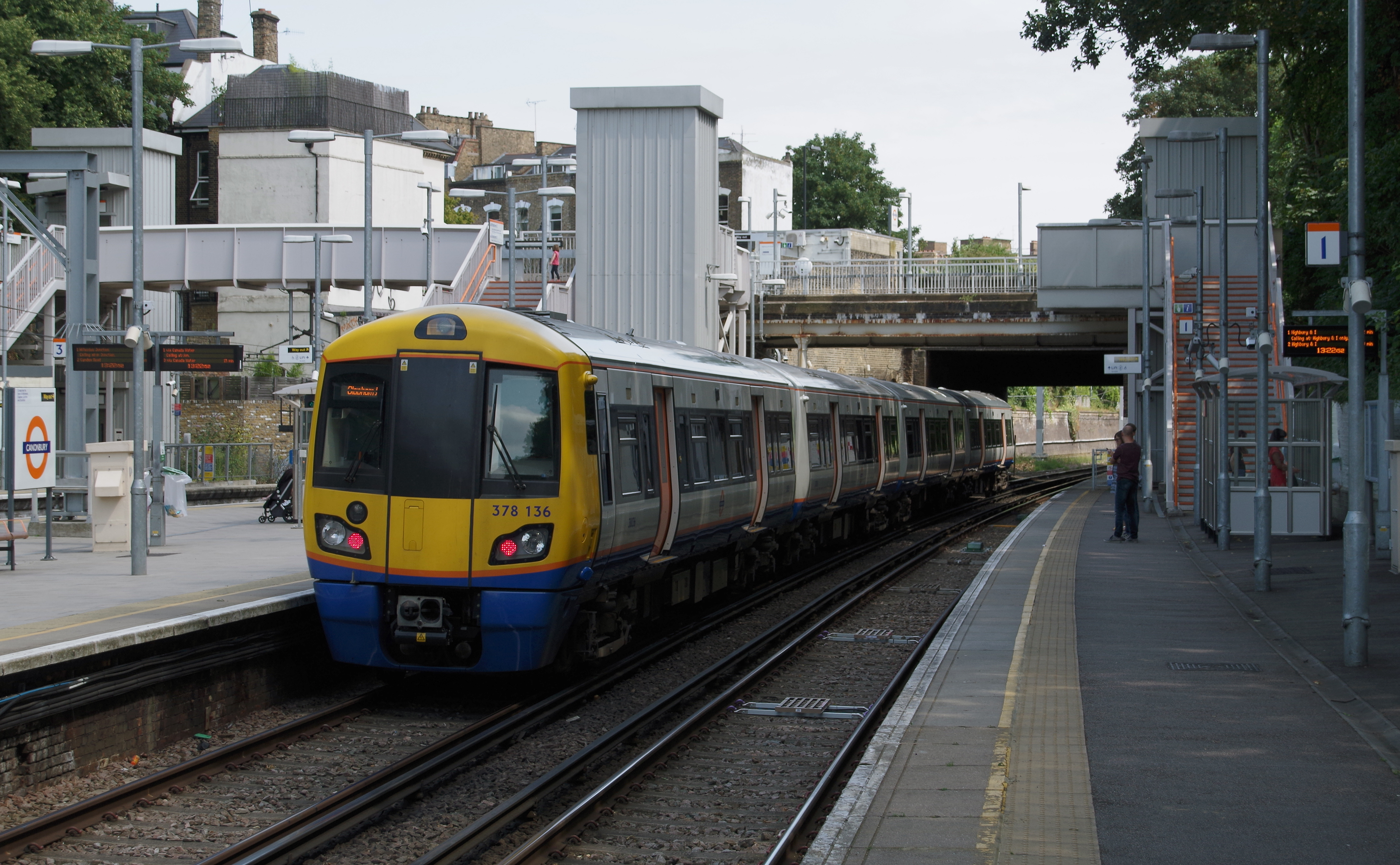
- Canonbury railway station
- Interactive map of Canonbury

General information
- Location: Canonbury
- Local authority: Islington
- Managed by: London Overground
- Owner: Network Rail
- Station code: CNN
- DfT category: F1
- Number of platforms: 4
- Accessible: Yes
- Fare zone: 2

National Rail annual entry and exit
- 2020–21: ▼0.913 million
- Interchange: ▼0.192 million
- 2021–22: ▲1.950 million
- Interchange: ▲0.390 million
- 2022–23: ▲2.350 million
- Interchange: ▲0.842 million
- 2023–24: ▲2.752 million
- Interchange: ▲0.926 million
- 2024–25: ▲2.835 million
- Interchange: ▼0.836 million

Key dates
- 1858: opened
- 1870: resited

Other information
- External links: Departures; Facilities
- Coordinates: 51.5482°N 0.0925°W

Canonbury is a station on the Mildmay and Windrush lines of the London Overground, serving the districts of Canonbury and Highbury within the London Borough of Islington in north London. It is close to the boundary with the London Borough of Hackney. The station is situated in London fare zone 2.

== History ==
The station was originally named "Newington Road and Balls Pond Road" when opened in 1858 by the North London Railway, and was sited east of the present station on the east side of Newington Green Road. The station was renamed "Canonbury" in July 1870 and then resited to its present location, the west side of Douglas Road (now Wallace Road), in December of the same year. The Victorian main building was demolished in 1969, although the building was fully intact.

In 2007, the ticket office was extensively refurbished, as part of the station upgrade programme delivered through conversion to London Overground. On 1 June 2010, as a result of the East London Line extension, North London line services were rerouted to the newly constructed platforms 3 and 4, with the East London line trains now using refurbished platforms 1 and 2.

To the west of the station is the Canonbury curve, a freight-only connection through the Canonbury tunnel to the East Coast Main Line at Finsbury Park which had opened in 1874. A passenger service operated to/from Broad Street from 1875 until 1976 when suburban services from the main line were diverted to Moorgate via the newly built surface connection between Finsbury Park and Drayton Park.

Between 14 May 1979 and 11 May 1985 the station was served by the Crosstown Linkline diesel multiple unit service between Camden Road and North Woolwich.

The North London line between Gospel Oak and Stratford closed in February 2010, for installing a new signalling system and for extending 30 platforms, in order in due course to allow four-car trains to run on the London Overground network. After reopening on 1 June 2010, the work continued until May 2011 with a reduced service operating Mondays to Saturdays and no service at all on Sundays.

During the NLL closure of February–May 2010, the through route was moved to the north side of the cutting, and two adjacent brand new platforms provided, an island platform replacing the former eastbound platform. This allowed the extended ELL to serve Canonbury (and Highbury & Islington) on a pair of completely segregated tracks occupying the former route on the south side of the cutting.

Since the northern extension of the East London line, which was completed and opened in March 2011, Canonbury station has had four platforms. This provides interchange between London Overground Mildmay line and Windrush line services with step-free access to all platforms and peak service frequencies of 12 trains per hour in each direction.

== Services ==
All times below are correct as of the May 2011 timetables.

=== Mildmay line ===
Mondays to Fridays there is a service approximately every 7–8 minutes. On Saturdays the service is approximately every 10 minutes. Services have resumed on Sundays and are similar to those on Saturdays. Details of these services are below: The times below are the typical weekday service at the station in trains per hour:

- 4 westbound to Richmond via Camden Road and Willesden Junction.
- 4 westbound to Clapham Junction also via Camden Road and Willesden Junction (no late evening service)
- 8 eastbound to Stratford via Hackney.

=== Windrush line ===
Mondays to Saturdays there is a service every 6–9 minutes throughout the day, while on Sundays before 13:00 there is a service every 15 minutes, changing to every 7–8 minutes until the end of service after that. Details of these services are below:

The times below are the typical weekday service at the station in trains per hour:

- 8 northbound to Highbury & Islington. (Platform 1)
- 4 southbound to Crystal Palace via Surrey Quays and Sydenham. (Platform 2)
- 4 southbound to West Croydon via Surrey Quays & Norwood Junction (not Sundays). (Platform 2)

Direct services to/from Clapham Junction run on Sundays only (change at Dalston Junction at other times)

Services run through the night on Friday and Saturday.

Preceding station	London Overground	Following station
Highbury & Islington towards Clapham Junction or Richmond	Mildmay line North London line	Dalston Kingsland towards Stratford
Highbury & Islington Terminus	Windrush line East London line	Dalston Junction towards Crystal Palace or West Croydon
Disused Railways
Highbury & Islington	North London Railway; 1850–1934	Mildmay Park

== Connections ==
London Buses route 236 serves the station.
