= Mildmay Park railway station =

Former railway station in the London Borough of Islington

Mildmay Park
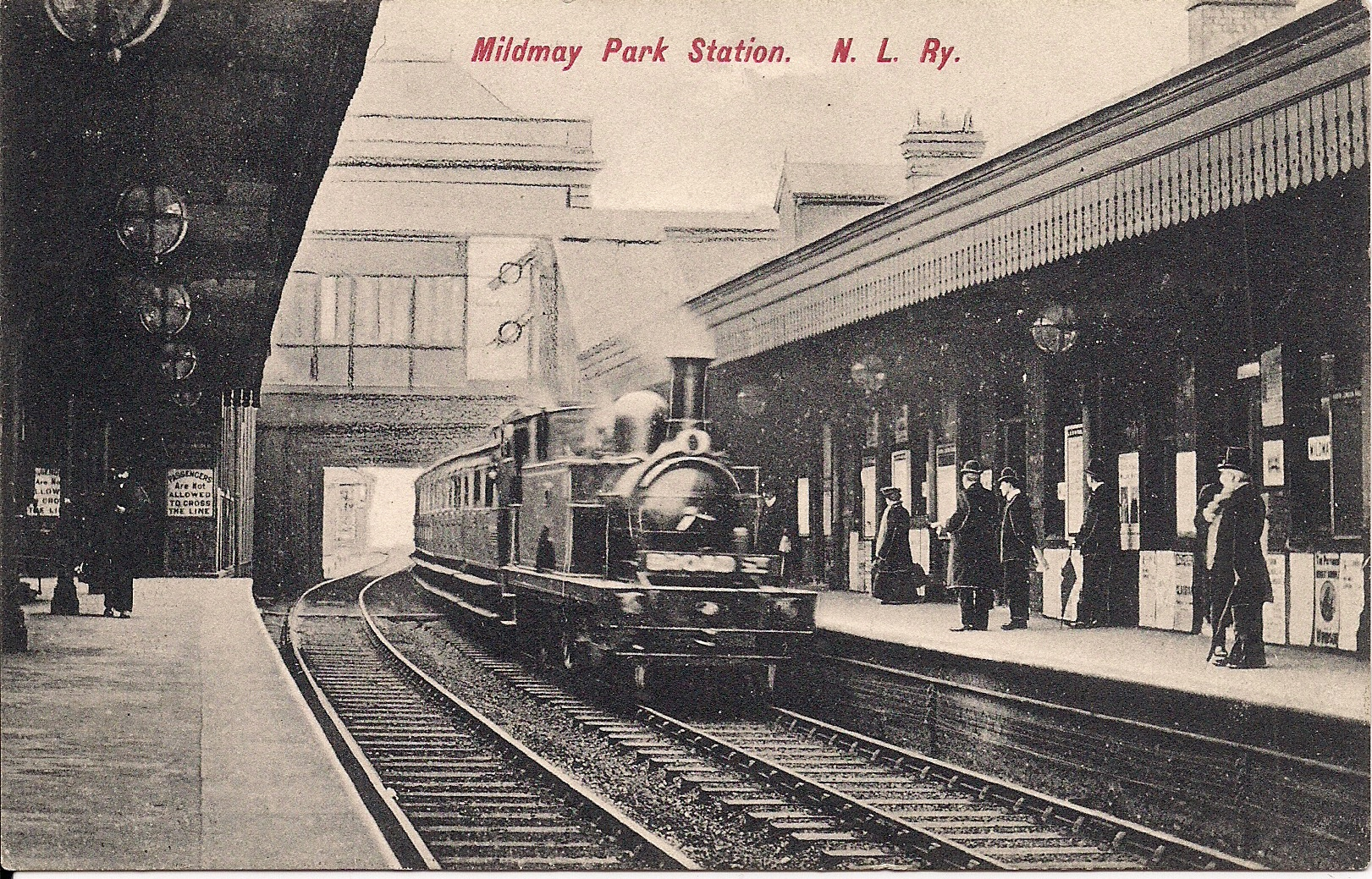
- Interactive map of Mildmay Park

General information
- Location: Newington Green
- Owner: North London Railway
- Number of platforms: 4

Key dates
- 1880: Opened (NLR)
- 1934: Closed (LMS)

Other information
- Coordinates: 51.5487°N 0.0829°W

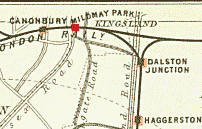
Neighbouring stations in 1899

Mildmay Park railway station was a railway station on the North London line located between Canonbury and Hackney stations, and on its City Branch between Canonbury and Dalston Junction.

The station was located on Mildmay Park between Newington Green and Balls Pond Road.

== History ==
The North London Railway from Dalston Junction to Highbury & Islington was opened on 26 September 1850, although the station was not opened until 1 January 1880. It was closed by the London, Midland and Scottish Railway on 1 October 1934. The ticket office that was located on brick columns over the eastbound track was demolished in 1987. Some remnants of the platforms are still visible from what in 2024 were renamed the London Overground Mildmay and Windrush lines.

Preceding station	Historical railways	Following station
Canonbury; Line and station open	London and North Western Railway; North London Line City Branch	Dalston Junction; Line and station open
