= Homerton railway station =

London Overground station

Homerton
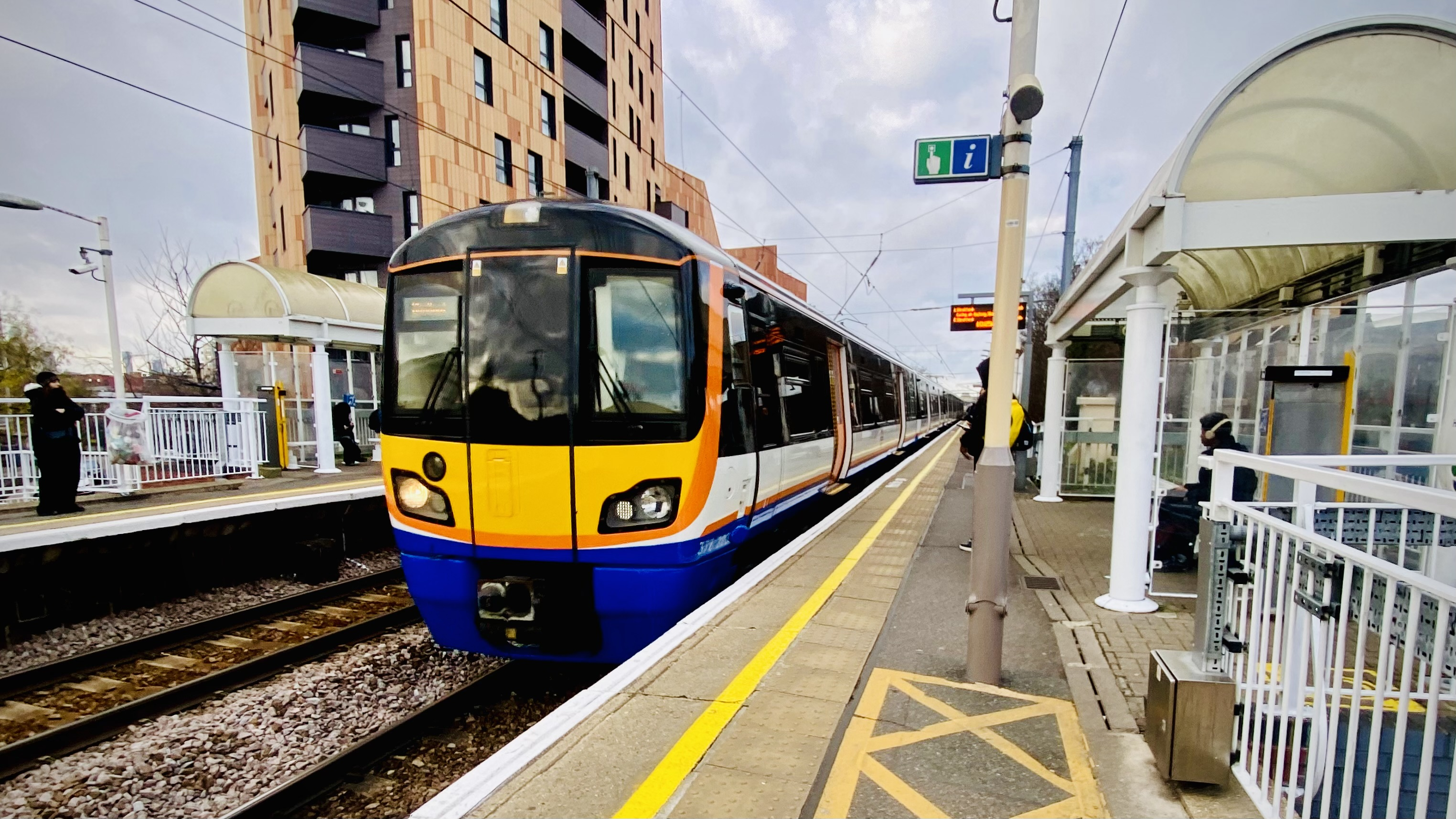
- Interactive map of Homerton

General information
- Location: Homerton
- Local authority: London Borough of Hackney
- Managed by: London Overground
- Owner: Network Rail
- Station code: HMN
- DfT category: E
- Number of platforms: 2
- Accessible: Yes
- Fare zone: 2

National Rail annual entry and exit
- 2020–21: ▼1.774 million
- 2021–22: ▲3.299 million
- 2022–23: ▲3.863 million
- 2023–24: ▲4.556 million
- 2024–25: ▲4.686 million

Key dates
- 1 October 1868: Opened
- 15 May 1944: Temporarily Closed
- 23 April 1945: Officially Closed
- 13 May 1985: Present Station Opened

Other information
- External links: Departures; Facilities
- Coordinates: 51.547°N 0.0431°W

Homerton is a station on the Mildmay line of the London Overground, located in the district of Homerton, East London. Situated in London fare zone 2, the current station opened on 13 May 1985 to coincide with the introduction of the Richmond to North Woolwich through electric passenger service. The station is close to Homerton University Hospital and Hackney Marshes.

== History ==
The original station was opened on 1 October 1868 by the North London Railway. Services ceased on 15 May 1944 with a substitute bus service provided until official closure on 23 April 1945. Other than a partial section of wall to the north of the bridge over Barnabas Road, the original 1868 station has been demolished. Although of reduced size, the original station building would have been similar to buildings remaining at Hackney Central and Camden Road.

The present basic station was opened on 13 May 1985, to coincide with the introduction of the North London Link service between Richmond and North Woolwich.

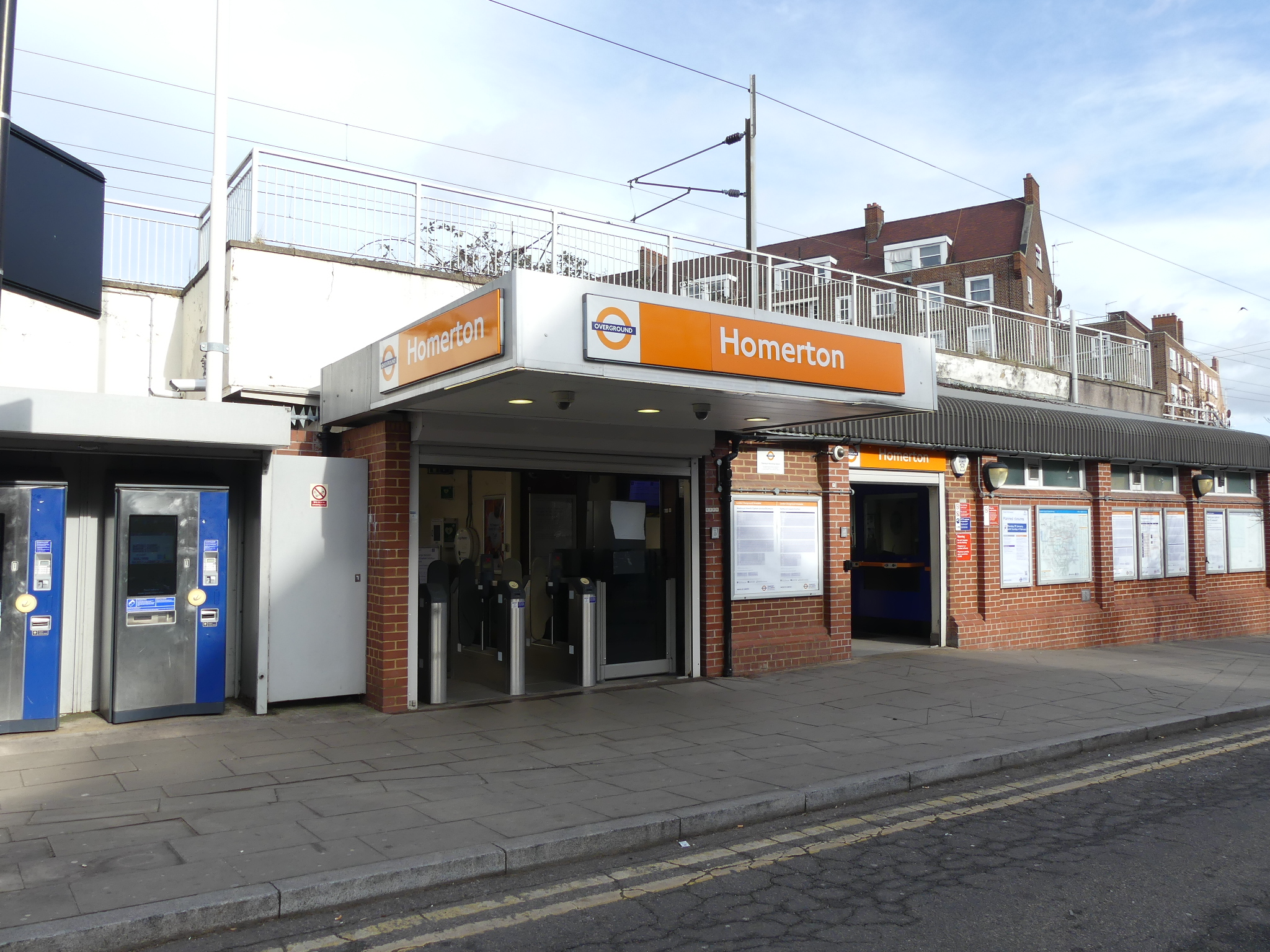
The entrance to Homerton station on Berger Road

In February 2010, as part of the programme to introduce four-car trains on the London Overground network, the North London line between Gospel Oak and Stratford closed to enable the installation of a new signalling system and the extension of 30 platforms along the route. Engineering work continued until May 2011, during which reduced services operated and Sunday services were suspended. The line reopened on 1 June 2010.

== Services ==
The typical service at the station is four trains per hour westbound to Richmond via Hackney Central, Highbury, Camden Road and Willesden Junction, alternating with four trains per hour westbound to Clapham Junction. There are eight trains per hour eastbound to Stratford. These extra services which were introduced following maintenance work on the North London line have replaced the additional shuttle train running between Camden Road and Stratford in the morning and evening peaks.

Preceding station	London Overground	Following station
Hackney Central towards Clapham Junction or Richmond	Mildmay line North London line	Hackney Wick towards Stratford
Disused railways
Hackney Central	North London; Railway	Victoria Park
