= List of stations in London fare zone 2 =

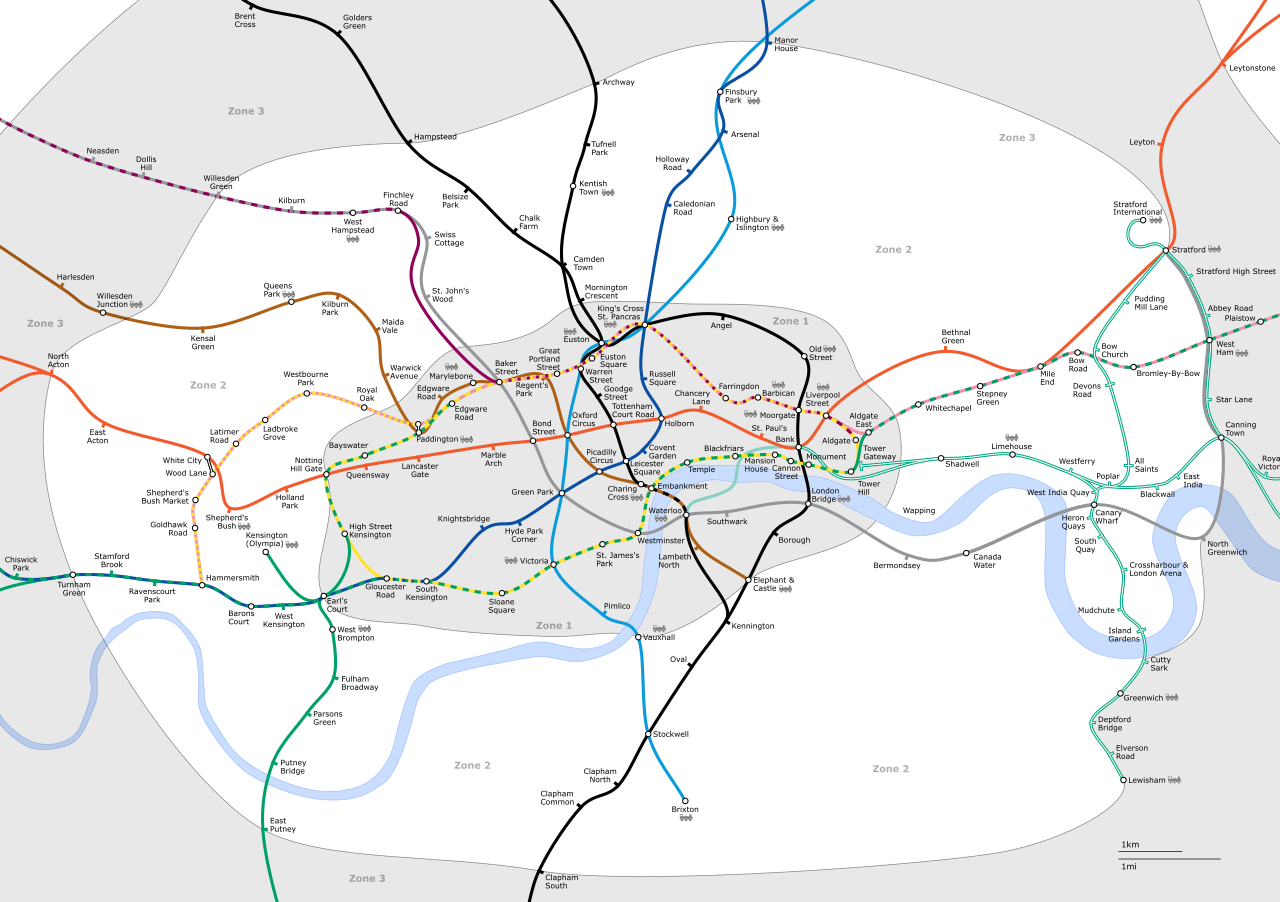
Map of Zone 2 Underground stations, pre 2021

Fare zone 2 is an inner zone of Transport for London's zonal fare system used for calculating the price of tickets for travel on the London Underground, London Overground, Docklands Light Railway (DLR) and, since 2007, on National Rail services.

== Background ==
London is split into six approximately concentric zones for the purpose of determining the cost of single fares and Travelcards. Every London Underground line—except for the Waterloo & City line—has stations in zone 2. It was created on 22 May 1983 and extends from approximately 2 to 5 miles (3 to 8 km) from Piccadilly Circus.

== List of stations ==
The following stations are in zone 2:

Station	Local authority	Managed by	Notes
Abbey Road	Newham	DLR	Also in zone 3
All Saints	Tower Hamlets	DLR	
Archway	Islington	London Underground	Also in zone 3
Arsenal	Islington	London Underground	
Barons Court	Hammersmith and Fulham	London Underground	
Battersea Park	Wandsworth	Southern	
Belsize Park	Camden	London Underground	
Bermondsey	Southwark	London Underground	
Bethnal Green LU	Tower Hamlets	London Underground	
Bethnal Green NR	Tower Hamlets	London Overground	
Blackwall	Tower Hamlets	DLR	
Bow Church	Tower Hamlets	DLR	
Bow Road	Tower Hamlets	London Underground	
Brixton LU	Lambeth	London Underground	
Brixton NR	Lambeth	Southeastern	
Brockley	Lewisham	London Overground	
Bromley-by-Bow	Tower Hamlets	London Underground	Also in zone 3
Brondesbury	Brent	London Overground	
Brondesbury Park	Brent	London Overground	
Caledonian Road	Islington	London Underground	
Caledonian Road and Barnsbury	Islington	London Overground	
Cambridge Heath	Tower Hamlets	London Overground	
Camden Road	Camden	London Overground	
Camden Town	Camden	London Underground	
Canada Water	Southwark	London Underground; London Overground	
Canary Wharf LU	Tower Hamlets	London Underground	
Canary Wharf DLR	Tower Hamlets	DLR	
Canary Wharf NR	Tower Hamlets	Elizabeth line	
Canning Town	Newham	London Underground	Also in zone 3
Canonbury	Islington	London Overground	
Chalk Farm	Camden	London Underground	
Clapham Common	Lambeth	London Underground	
Clapham High Street	Lambeth	London Overground	
Clapham Junction	Wandsworth	Network Rail	
Clapham North	Lambeth	London Underground	
Clapham South	Wandsworth	London Underground	Also in zone 3
Clapton	Hackney	London Overground	Also in zone 3
Crossharbour	Tower Hamlets	DLR	
Cutty Sark	Greenwich	DLR	Also in zone 3
Dalston Junction	Hackney	London Overground	
Dalston Kingsland	Hackney	London Overground	
Denmark Hill	Southwark	Thameslink	
Deptford	Lewisham	Southeastern	
Deptford Bridge	Lewisham	DLR	Also in zone 3
Devons Road	Tower Hamlets	DLR	
Drayton Park	Islington	Great Northern	
Earl's Court	Kensington and Chelsea	London Underground	Also in zone 1
East Acton	Hammersmith and Fulham	London Underground	
East Dulwich	Southwark	Southern	
East India	Tower Hamlets	DLR	Also in zone 3
East Putney	Wandsworth	London Underground	Also in zone 3
Elephant & Castle LU	Southwark	London Underground	Also in zone 1
Elephant & Castle NR	Southwark	Thameslink	Also in zone 1
Elverson Road	Greenwich	DLR	Also in zone 3
Essex Road	Islington	Great Northern	
Finchley Road	Camden	London Underground	
Finchley Road & Frognal	Camden	London Overground	
Finsbury Park LU	Islington	London Underground	
Finsbury Park NR	Islington	Great Northern	
Fulham Broadway	Hammersmith and Fulham	London Underground	
Goldhawk Road	Hammersmith and Fulham	London Underground	
Gospel Oak	Camden	London Overground	
Greenwich	Greenwich	Southeastern	Also in zone 3
Hackney Central	Hackney	London Overground	
Hackney Downs	Hackney	London Overground	
Hackney Wick	Hackney	London Overground	
Haggerston	Hackney	London Overground	
Hammersmith (Circle/H&City)	Hammersmith and Fulham	London Underground	
Hammersmith (District/Piccadilly)	Hammersmith and Fulham	London Underground	
Hampstead	Camden	London Underground	Also in zone 3
Hampstead Heath	Camden	London Overground	
Herne Hill	Lambeth	Southeastern	Also in zone 3
Heron Quays	Tower Hamlets	DLR	
Highbury & Islington	Islington	London Underground	
Holland Park	Kensington and Chelsea	London Underground	
Holloway Road	Islington	London Underground	
Homerton	Hackney	London Overground	
Hoxton	Hackney	London Overground	Also in zone 1
Imperial Wharf	Hammersmith and Fulham	London Overground	
Island Gardens	Tower Hamlets	DLR	
Kennington	Lambeth	London Underground	Also in zone 1
Kensal Green	Brent	London Underground	
Kensal Rise	Brent	London Overground	
Kensington (Olympia)	Kensington and Chelsea	London Overground	
Kentish Town	Camden	London Underground	
Kentish Town West	Camden	London Overground	
Kilburn	Brent	London Underground	
Kilburn High Road	Camden	London Overground	
Kilburn Park	Brent	London Underground	
Ladbroke Grove	Kensington and Chelsea	London Underground	
Langdon Park	Tower Hamlets	DLR	
Latimer Road	Kensington and Chelsea	London Underground	
Lewisham DLR	Lewisham	DLR	Also in zone 3
Lewisham NR	Lewisham	Southeastern	Also in zone 3
Limehouse DLR	Tower Hamlets	DLR	
Limehouse NR	Tower Hamlets	c2c	
London Fields	Hackney	London Overground	
Loughborough Junction	Lambeth	Thameslink	
Maida Vale	Westminster	London Underground	
Manor House	Hackney	London Underground	Also in zone 3
Mile End	Tower Hamlets	London Underground	
Mornington Crescent	Camden	London Underground	
Mudchute	Tower Hamlets	DLR	
New Cross	Lewisham	Southeastern	
New Cross Gate	Lewisham	London Overground	
North Acton	Ealing	London Underground	Also in zone 3
North Dulwich	Southwark	Southern	Also in zone 3
North Greenwich	Greenwich	London Underground	Also in zone 3
Notting Hill Gate	Kensington and Chelsea	London Underground	Also in zone 1
Nunhead	Southwark	Southeastern	
Oval	Lambeth	London Underground	
Parsons Green	Hammersmith and Fulham	London Underground	
Peckham Rye	Southwark	Southern	
Poplar	Tower Hamlets	DLR	
Pudding Mill Lane	Newham	DLR	Also in zone 3
Putney	Wandsworth	South Western Railway	Also in zone 3
Putney Bridge	Hammersmith and Fulham	London Underground	
Queen's Park	Brent	London Underground	
Queens Road Peckham	Southwark	Southern	
Queenstown Road	Wandsworth	South Western Railway	
Ravenscourt Park	Hammersmith and Fulham	London Underground	
Rectory Road	Hackney	London Overground	
Rotherhithe	Southwark	London Overground	
Royal Oak	Westminster	London Underground	
Shadwell DLR	Tower Hamlets	DLR	
Shadwell NR	Tower Hamlets	London Overground	
Shepherd's Bush LU	Hammersmith and Fulham	London Underground	
Shepherd's Bush NR	Hammersmith and Fulham	London Overground	
Shepherd's Bush Market	Hammersmith and Fulham	London Underground	
South Bermondsey	Southwark	Southern	
South Hampstead	Camden	London Overground	
South Quay	Tower Hamlets	DLR	
St Johns	Lewisham	Southeastern	
St John's Wood	Westminster	London Underground	
Stamford Brook	Hounslow	London Underground	
Star Lane	Newham	DLR	Also in zone 3
Stepney Green	Tower Hamlets	London Underground	
Stockwell	Lambeth	London Underground	
Stoke Newington	Hackney	London Overground	
Stratford	Newham	London Underground	Also in zone 3
Stratford High Street	Newham	DLR	Also in zone 3
Stratford International DLR	Newham	DLR	Also in zone 3
Stratford International HS1	Newham	Southeastern	Also in zone 3. (Note: Transport for London Oyster card and contactless pay-as-you-go is only available between St Pancras and Stratford International. Other zone-based ticketing is not available.)
Surrey Quays	Southwark	London Overground	
Swiss Cottage	Camden	London Underground	
Tufnell Park	Islington	London Underground	
Turnham Green	Hounslow	London Underground	Also in zone 3
Upper Holloway	Islington	London Overground	
Vauxhall LU	Lambeth	London Underground	Also in zone 1
Vauxhall NR	Lambeth	South Western Railway	Also in zone 1
Wandsworth Road	Lambeth	Southern	
Wandsworth Town	Wandsworth	South Western Railway	
Wapping	Tower Hamlets	London Overground	
Warwick Avenue	Westminster	London Underground	
West Brompton	Kensington and Chelsea	London Underground	
West Ham	Newham	London Underground	Also in zone 3
West Hampstead LU	Camden	London Underground	
West Hampstead NR	Camden	London Overground	
West Hampstead Thameslink	Camden	Thameslink	
West India Quay	Tower Hamlets	DLR	
West Kensington	Kensington and Chelsea	London Underground	
Westbourne Park	Westminster	London Underground	
Westferry	Tower Hamlets	DLR	
Whitechapel	Tower Hamlets	London Underground	
White City	Hammersmith and Fulham	London Underground	
Willesden Green	Brent	London Underground	Also in zone 3
Willesden Junction	Brent	London Underground	Also in zone 3
Wood Lane	Hammersmith and Fulham	London Underground	

== Changes ==
- January 1999: East India and Pudding Mill Lane (DLR) from Zone 3 to Zone 2/3 boundary
- January 2008: Hampstead Heath from Zone 3 to Zone 2, Willesden Junction from Zone 3 to Zone 2/3 boundary and Acton Central from Zone 2 to Zone 3
- January 2016: Stratford, Stratford High Street, Stratford International DLR station, West Ham, Canning Town, Star Lane and Abbey Road from Zone 3 to Zone 2/3 boundary.
- May 2021: Kennington from Zone 2 to Zone 1/2 boundary
