= Mildmay line =

Railway service in London

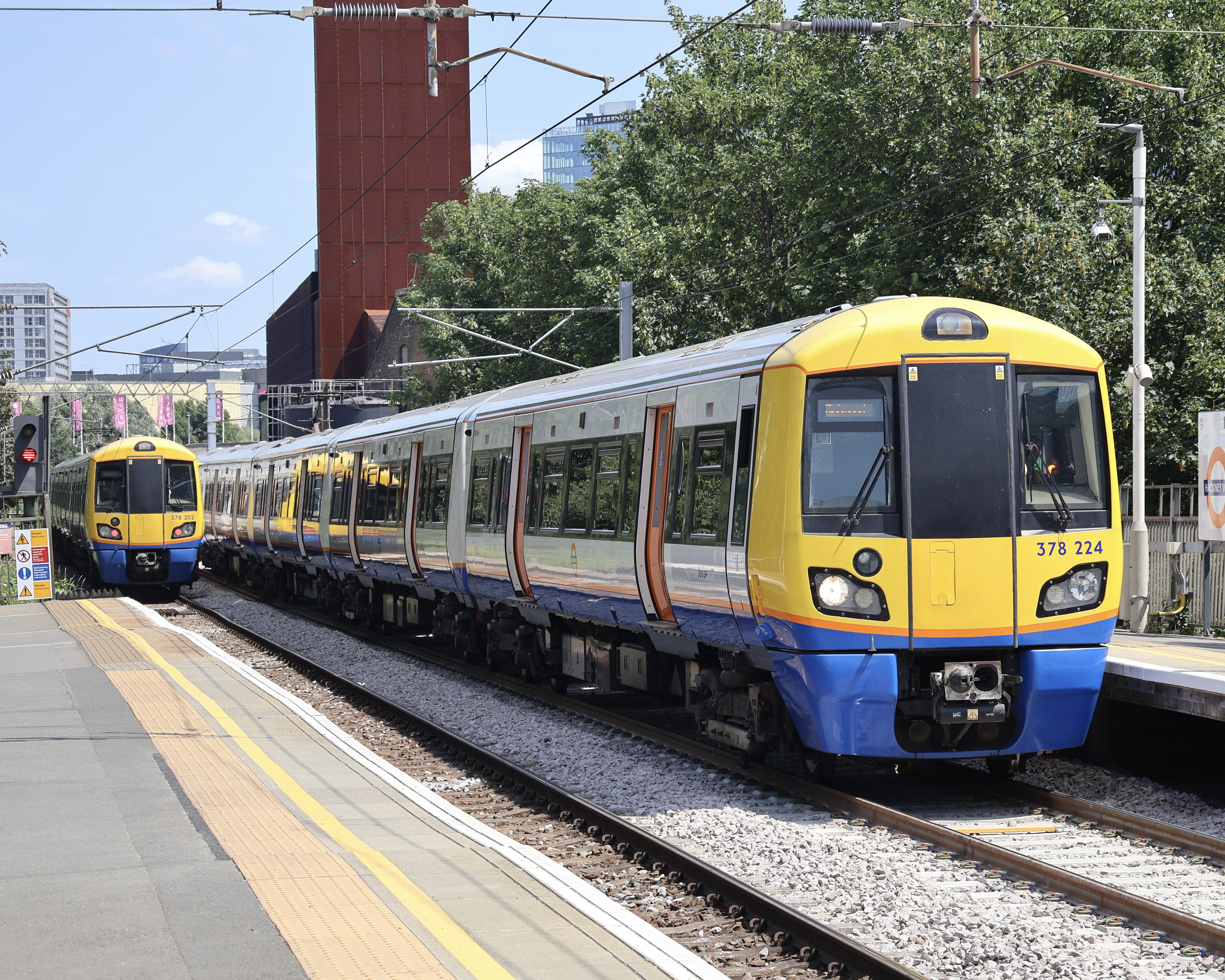
- Class 378 Capitalstar at Hackney Wick

Overview
- Service type: Suburban rail
- System: National Rail; London Overground
- Status: Operational
- Locale: Greater London

Route
- Termini: Richmond; Clapham Junction; Stratford
- Stops: 28
- Lines used: North London line; West London line

Technical
- Rolling stock: Overground: Class 378 / Class 710
- Track gauge: 1,435 mm (4 ft 8 1/2 in) standard gauge
- Electrification: Overhead line, 25 kV 50 Hz AC; Third rail, 750 V DC
- Depot: Willesden TMD
- Track owner: Network Rail
Route map
London Overground service

The Mildmay line is the service operated by London Overground on the North London and West London railway lines. It passes through the inner suburbs of London, between Richmond and Clapham Junction in the south-west and Stratford in the east, avoiding central London. It is one of two London Overground lines to form the outer circle of London, linking at Clapham Junction and Highbury and Islington with the Windrush line. Prior to the name being adopted in November 2024, the service was labelled in Transport for London timetables as the Richmond and Clapham Junction to Stratford route.

The name of the service was chosen to honour the Mildmay Mission Hospital, which treated patients during the HIV/AIDS crisis in the 1980s. Since 2014 the hospital itself has however been relocated to a new facility more closely served by the Windrush line. A more straightforward connection to the Mildmay area around Newington Green, spanning the core of the route near Canonbury and served by Mildmay Park railway station until 1934, was not cited when the name was selected. The line is blue on the Tube map.

== History ==
=== Renaming ===
The name proposed for this service in 2015 was the North London line. In 2021, Sadiq Khan announced that if re-elected as Mayor of London, he would give the six services operated by London Overground unique names that would reflect London's diversity, working with his Commission for Diversity in the Public Realm. In July 2023, TfL announced that it would be giving each of the six London Overground services unique names by the end of 2024. In February 2024, it was confirmed that the service from Stratford on the North London and West London railway lines would be named the Mildmay line and would be coloured sky blue on the updated network map.

== Services ==
As of May 2025, the typical off-peak service pattern is:

Mildmay line
Route	Trains per hour	Calling at
Richmond to Stratford	4	Kew Gardens; Gunnersbury, South Acton; Acton Central; Willesden Junction; Kensal Rise; Brondesbury Park; Brondesbury; West Hampstead; Finchley Road & Frognal; Hampstead Heath; Gospel Oak; Kentish Town West; Camden Road; Caledonian Road & Barnsbury; Highbury & Islington; Canonbury; Dalston Kingsland; Hackney Central; Homerton; Hackney Wick
Clapham Junction to Stratford	4	Imperial Wharf; West Brompton; Kensington (Olympia); Shepherd's Bush; Willesden Junction; Kensal Rise; Brondesbury Park; Brondesbury; West Hampstead; Finchley Road & Frognal; Hampstead Heath; Gospel Oak; Kentish Town West; Camden Road; Caledonian Road & Barnsbury; Highbury & Islington; Canonbury; Dalston Kingsland; Hackney Central; Homerton; Hackney Wick

In the official Mildmay line timetable, the passenger train service run by Southern between East Croydon and Watford Junction is indicated. This service shares infrastructure with Mildmay line trains between Clapham Junction and Shepherd's Bush stations, after which they join the West Coast Main Line en route to Watford Junction. This service operates at a frequency of one train per hour.

== Route map ==
London Overground network
Schematic map of the London Overground network

Geographic map showing London Overground
