= Pudding Mill Lane DLR station =

Docklands Light Railway station

Pudding Mill Lane
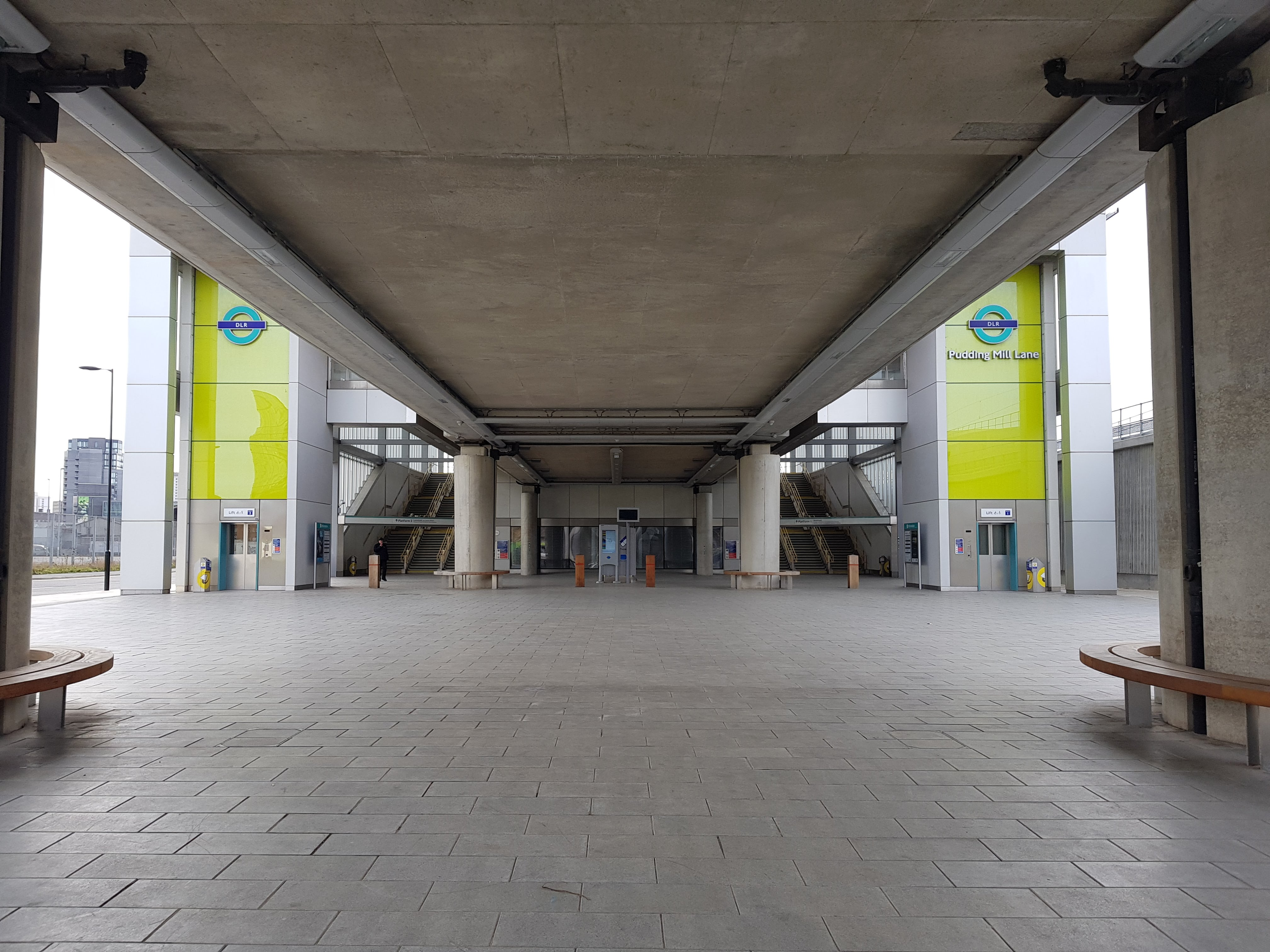
- Station entrance

General information
- Location: Stratford, Newham
- Coordinates: 51.5341°N 0.0138°W
- Owned by: Transport for London
- Managed by: Docklands Light Railway
- Platforms: 2

Construction
- Structure type: Elevated
- Accessible: Yes

Other information
- Status: Unstaffed
- Fare zone: 2 and 3
- Website: Official website

History
- Opened: 15 January 1996

Key dates
- April 2014: Resited

Passengers

DLR annual entry and exit
- 2020: ▼0.619 million
- 2021: ▼0.615 million
- 2022: ▲2.640 million
- 2023: ▼2.310 million
- 2024: ▼2.30 million
Location
- Location in Newham

Pudding Mill Lane is a Docklands Light Railway (DLR) station in Stratford in London, England. It opened in 1996 on the road of the same name, once a light industrial area in Stratford, now being redeveloped into housing development called Pudding Mill Lane. It is next to the Olympic Park; however, it was closed for the duration of the 2012 Olympic Games and reopened on 12 September 2012. The original island platform station was permanently closed on 18 April 2014 in order to allow for the construction of a ramp from the new Crossrail portal nearby. A new, larger station built a short distance to the south opened on 28 April 2014.

The station is located on the DLR's Stratford to Poplar branch, between the Bow Church and Stratford stations and is on the boundary between London fare zone 2 and 3. Trains also run to Lewisham in the morning peaks.

== History ==
=== Original station ===
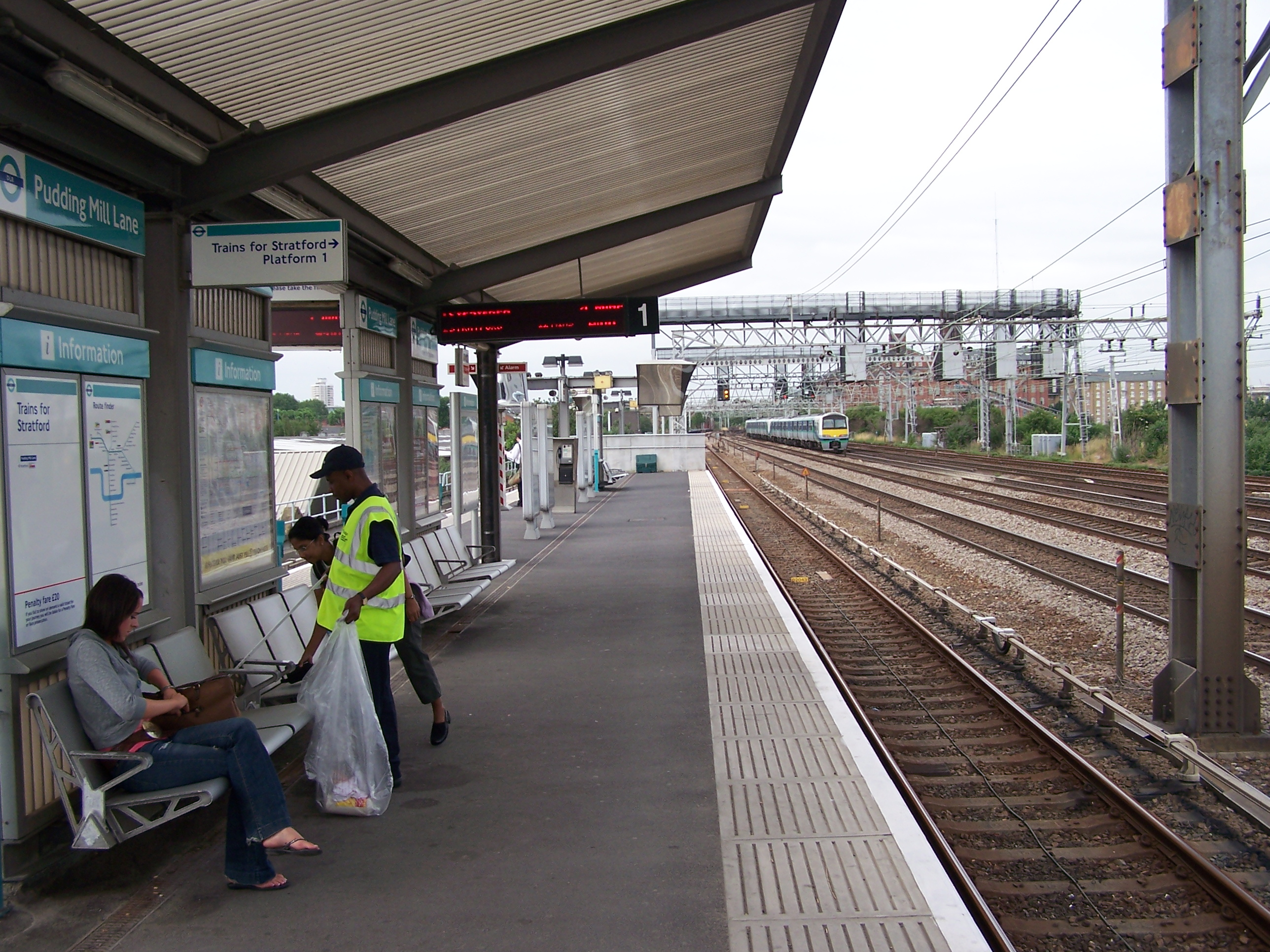
Island platform at the original station

The plans for the DLR to Stratford included an option for a station at Pudding Mill Lane. Funding was not available to build the station, but the location was one of two places safeguarded for future development, the other being Langdon Park.

Pudding Mill Lane was opened on 15 January 1996. Previously this location had been a simple passing point for trains on the otherwise single-tracked section between Stratford and Bow Church.

The name of the station is taken from the nearby Pudding Mill Lane which, in turn, takes its name from the former Pudding Mill River, a minor tributary of the River Lea. This is believed to have taken its name from St. Thomas's Mill, a local water mill shaped like a pudding and commonly known as Pudding Mill. The area had also been called Knob Hill up until the 1890s.

When all the other platforms on the DLR's Stratford branch were extended to accommodate three-car trains, Pudding Mill Lane remained with a two-car platform, instead using selective door operation. The lack of platform extensions in this case was due to the pending rebuild of the station.

During the 2012 Olympic Games, Pudding Mill Lane station was temporarily closed for safety reasons as, while ideally situated to serve the Olympic site, it was far too small to cope with the probable passenger numbers.

The original station closed after the last train departed at 00:47 on 17/18 April 2014, and its replacement opened on 28 April 2014.

=== New station ===
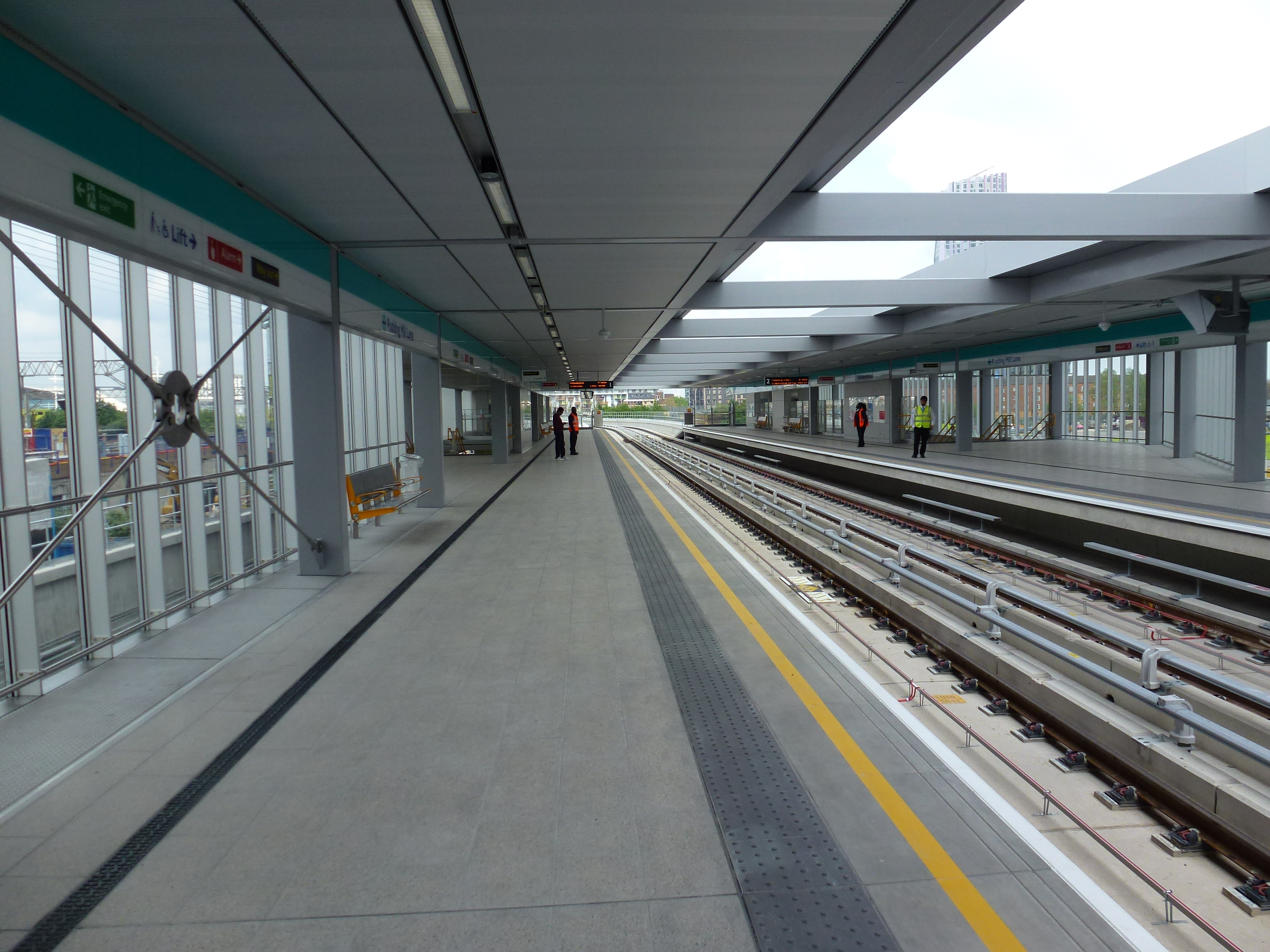
New station platforms

Crossrail has a tunnel portal to the east of the original Pudding Mill Lane site. The ramp from the portal to track level at Stratford station passes directly through the original Pudding Mill lane station site, thus required a replacement station to be built on a new viaduct nearby. The original station was demolished to make way for the new ramp, funded as part of the Crossrail project. This work also permitted the upgrade of the only significant stretch of single track left on the DLR to be doubled.

In July 2011, Newham Council's Strategic Development Committee approved plans by architect Weston Williamson for the new station. Sited just to the south of the old station, between the River Lea and City Mill River, it was built with a higher capacity to cope for new developments in the area. It has three-car platforms, better pedestrian links and access to buses, improved step-free access, and provision for escalators.

The station was flooded after torrential rain on 25 July 2021.

In May 2022, the station became the principal point of arrival for concert goers at the ABBA Arena, constructed across the road. An ABBA Voyage merchandise shop was subsequently opened in the station entrance.

== Services ==
The typical off-peak service in trains per hour from Pudding Mill Lane is:

- 12 tph to Stratford
- 12 tph to Canary Wharf

Additional services call at the station during the peak hours, increasing the service to up to 16 tph in each direction, with up to 8 tph during the peak hours extended beyond Canary Wharf to and from Lewisham.

Preceding station	DLR	Following station
Bow Church towards Lewisham	Docklands Light Railway	Stratford Terminus
