= Crosstown Linkline =

Railway service in London, England

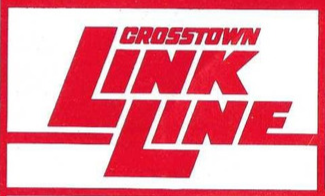

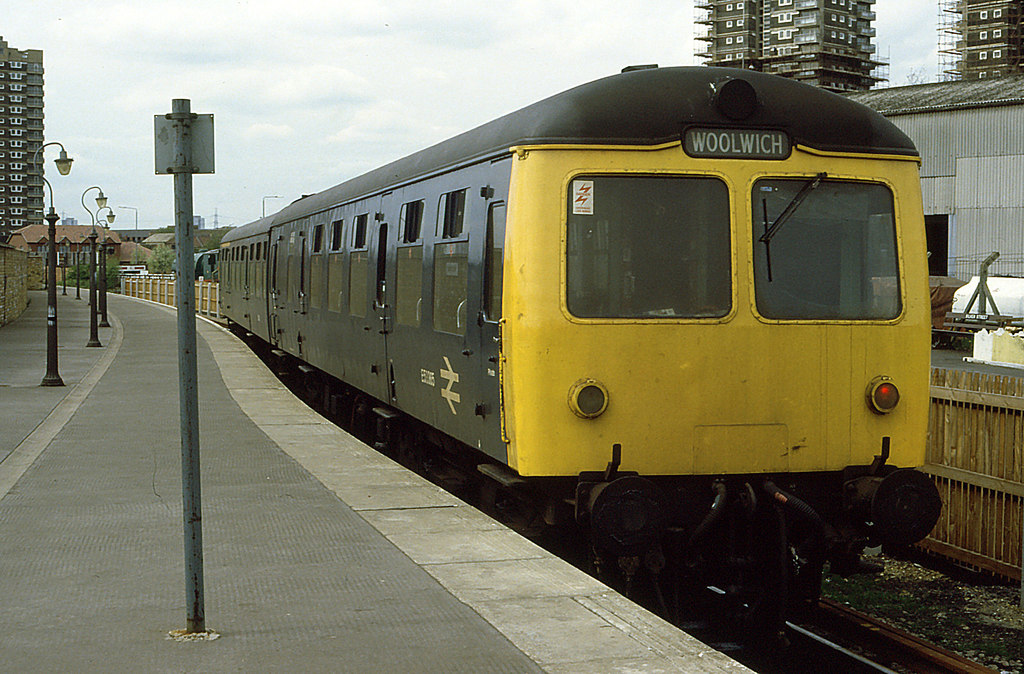
- Diesel Crosstown Linkline service at North Woolwich in May 1985, shortly before the service is replaced

Overview
- Locale: Greater London
- First service: 14 May 1979
- Last service: 11 May 1985
- Successor: North London Link
- Former operator(s): British Rail

Route
- Termini: Camden Road; North Woolwich
- Distance travelled: 11 miles (18 km)
- Average journey time: 37 minutes
- Service frequency: 2 trains hourly (3 at peak)

On-board services
- Class(es): Standard class only

Technical
- Rolling stock: British Rail Class 105

Crosstown Linkline was a railway service that operated from 14 May 1979 to 11 May 1985 between Camden Road and North Woolwich in London, England. The service was operated by British Rail with financial support from the Greater London Council. It reintroduced passenger trains to sections of line that had not been served for over thirty years. It benefited from several improvements during its brief existence as new stations were added and trains started running on Saturdays in 1983. Operated by diesel trains, it was replaced with the electric North London Link service between Richmond and North Woolwich from 13 May 1985.

== History ==
=== Background ===
The Greater London Council (GLC) and the Docklands Development Organisation jointly funded the service that was operated by British Rail, intending to improve transport in the Docklands regeneration area of East London. It was an extension of the existing Stratford to North Woolwich service. The service reintroduced passenger trains to areas that had not been served since the 1940s.

=== Infrastructure ===
Initially the service called at Camden Road, Caledonian Road & Barnsbury, Highbury & Islington, Canonbury, Stratford, West Ham, Canning Town, Custom House, Silvertown and North Woolwich. New platforms were provided at West Ham to coincide with the introduction of the service on 14 May 1979. Stations at Canning Town, Custom House, Silvertown and North Woolwich were upgraded.

The initial publicity for the route indicated three stations would be built between Canonbury and Stratford. Hackney Central and Hackney Wick stations were opened to passengers on 12 May 1980. The stations were funded by the GLC. There was a formal opening on the stations by Peter Parker of British Rail and Horace Cutler of the GLC on 11 June 1980. Dalston Kingsland station was opened on 16 May 1983.

=== Services ===
The route length was 11 miles with a journey time of 37 minutes. In 1981 the GLC asked British Rail to better publicise the service. The Railway Development Society published a survey of passenger opinions of the route in 1981. Passengers complained that the diesel trains were old and uncomfortable, there was no service at weekends and trains were frequently cancelled because of staff shortages. At the May 1982 timetable the off-peak service was two trains an hour with three trains an hour at peak times. Saturday service was introduced from 16 July 1983.

=== Replacement ===
The line was already third rail electrified between Camden Road and Canonbury where the service shared tracks with electric Broad Street services to Richmond and Watford. The third rail electrification was extended to North Woolwich in November 1984. The diesel Crosstown Linkline service was replaced with the electric North London Link service between Richmond and North Woolwich from 13 May 1985, with Homerton station between Hackney Central and Hackney Wick opening on the same day. Regular service was withdrawn between Canonbury and Broad Street, with Dalston Junction effectively replaced by Dalston Kingsland station.

== Gallery ==
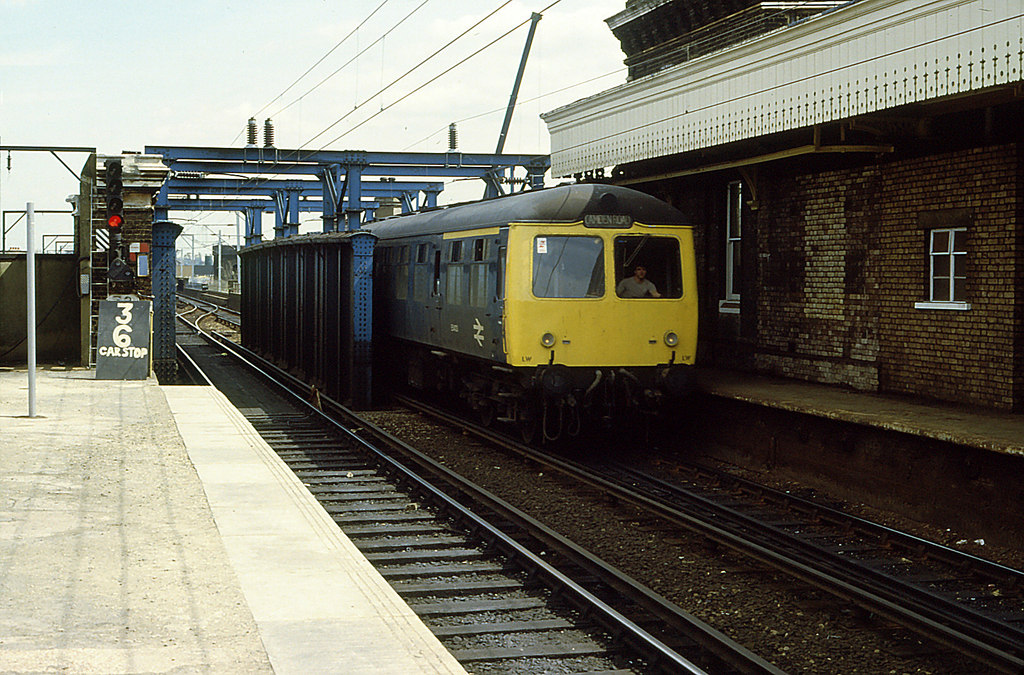
Service arriving at Camden Road in May 1985, shortly before the service is replaced

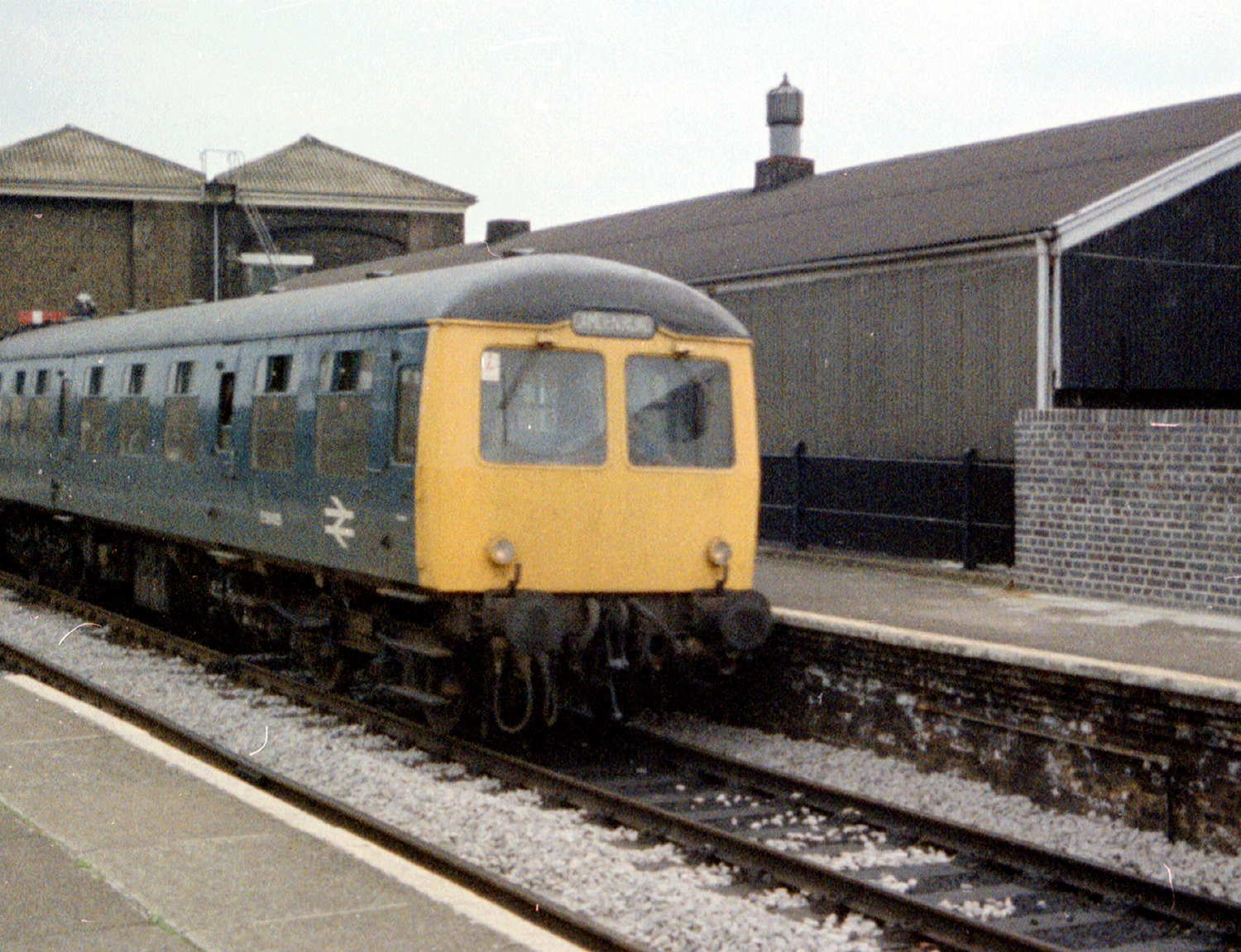
Train for Camden Road at Stratford

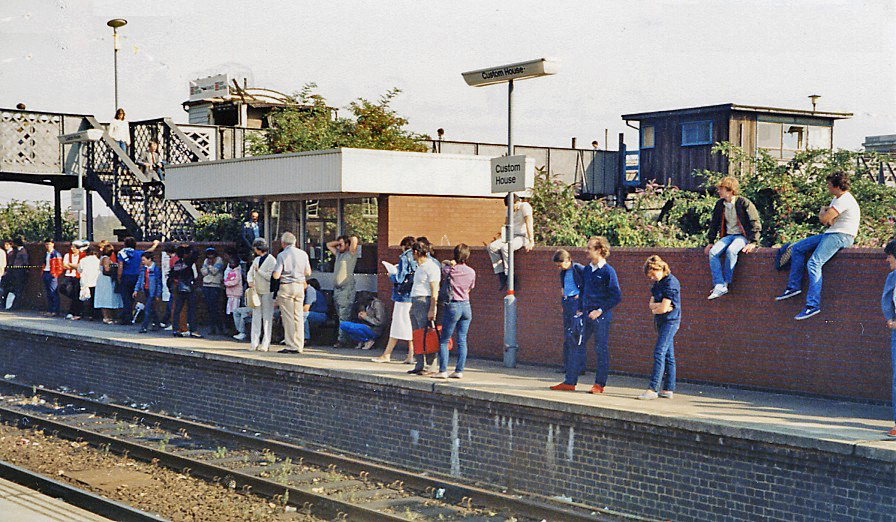
Custom House station in 1983

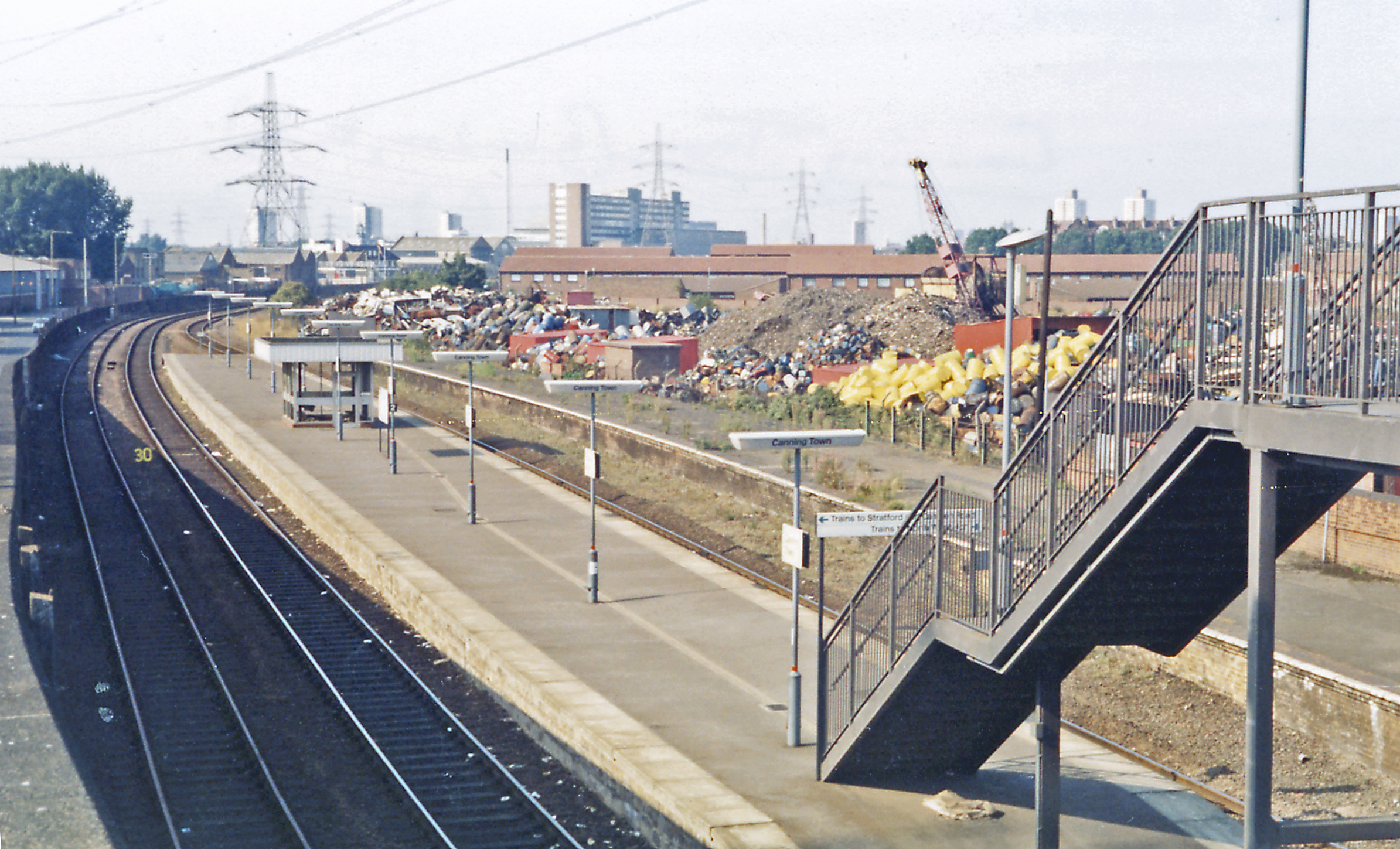
Canning Town station in 1983
