= Highbury & Islington station =

London Underground and railway station

Highbury & Islington
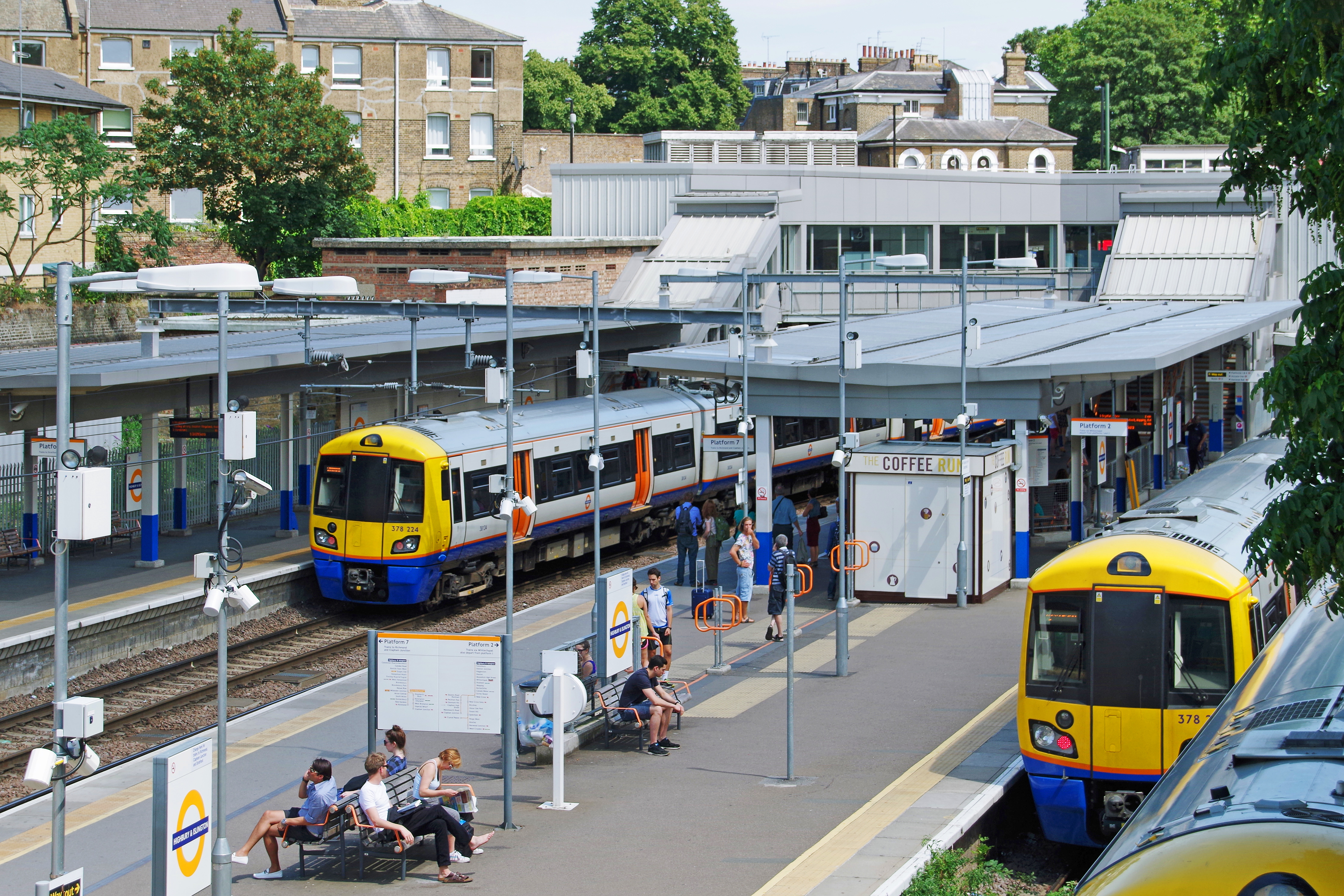
- London Overground platforms at the station
- Interactive map of Highbury & Islington

General information
- Location: Highbury & Islington
- Local authority: London Borough of Islington
- Managed by: London Underground; London Overground (surface platforms only)
- Station code: HHY
- DfT category: C2 (Great Northern platforms); F1 (London Overground)
- Number of platforms: 8
- Accessible: Yes (Overground platforms only)
- Fare zone: 2

London Underground annual entry and exit
- 2020: ▼8.22 million
- 2021: ▲8.34 million
- 2022: ▲13.76 million
- 2023: ▲14.14 million
- 2024: ▲15.05 million

National Rail annual entry and exit
- 2020–21: ▼8.661 million
- Interchange: ▼1.116 million
- 2021–22: ▲17.816 million
- Interchange: ▲2.193 million
- 2022–23: ▲20.601 million
- Interchange: ▲6.840 million
- 2023–24: ▲21.828 million
- Interchange: ▼3.780 million
- 2024–25: ▲23.983 million
- Interchange: ▼3.234 million

Key dates
- 26 September 1850: Opened (NLR)
- 28 June 1904: Opened (GN&CR)
- 1 September 1968: Opened (Victoria line)
- 1975: Closed (Northern line (Highbury branch))
- 1976: Opened (Northern City Line)
- February 2010: Overground platforms rebuilt
- 1 June 2010: North London Line platforms re-opened
- March 2011: East London Line platforms opened

Other information
- External links: TfL station info page; Departures; Facilities
- Coordinates: 51.5458°N 0.1050°W

Highbury & Islington (/ˈhaɪbəri ənd ˈɪzlɪŋtən/) is an interchange station in the London Borough of Islington, north London for London Underground, London Overground and National Rail services. The station is served by the Underground's Victoria line, the Overground's Mildmay and Windrush lines, and Great Northern's Northern City line.

On the Victoria line, the station is between King's Cross St Pancras and Finsbury Park. On the Mildmay line, it is between Caledonian Road & Barnsbury and Canonbury. The station is the terminus of the Windrush line, with Canonbury the preceding station. On the Northern City line, it is between Essex Road and Drayton Park, 2 miles 21 chains (3.6 km) down the line from Moorgate.

It is one of the busiest stations in the UK. The station is situated in London fare zone 2.

== History ==
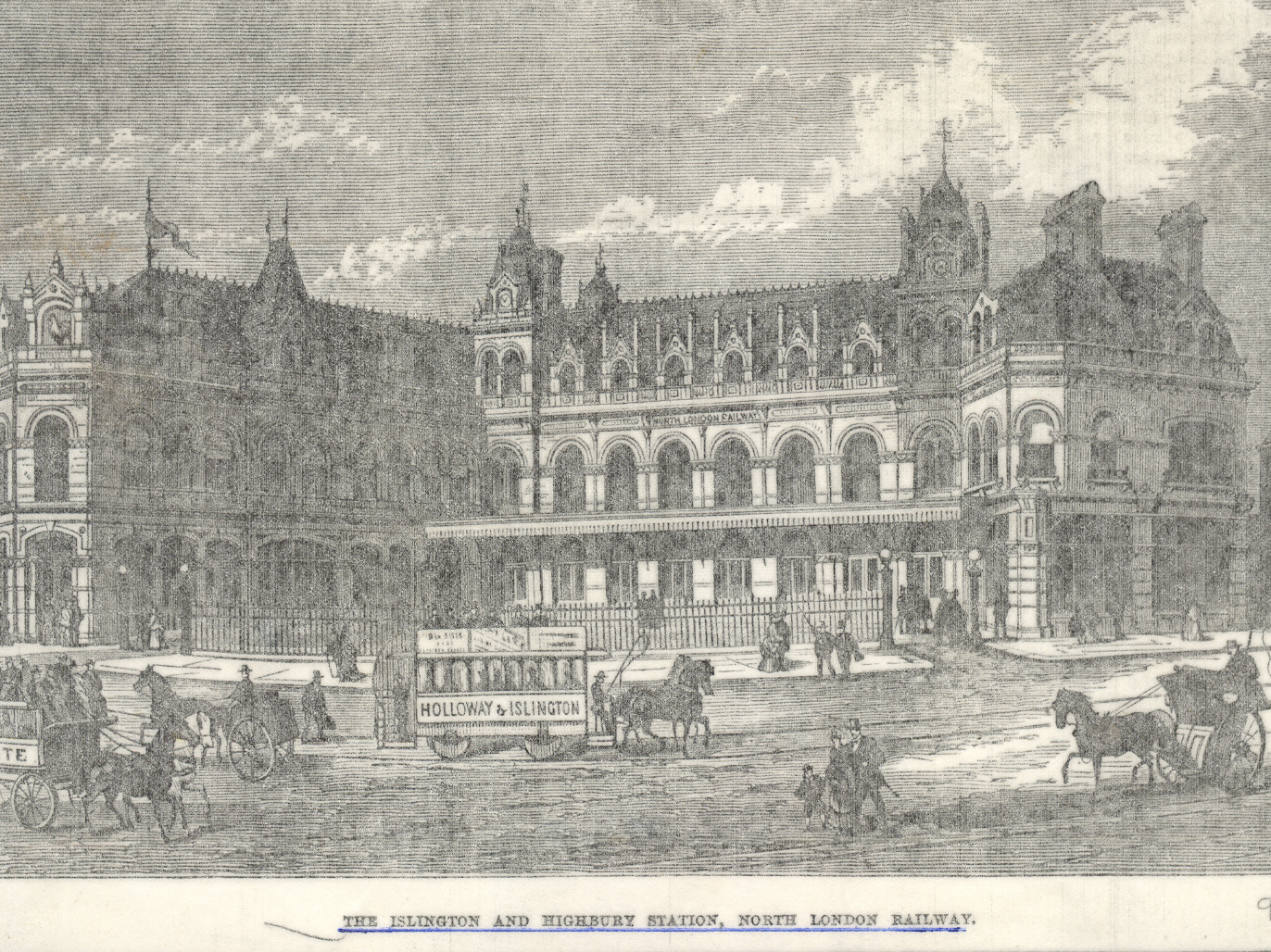
The Horne station building, pictured in 1873

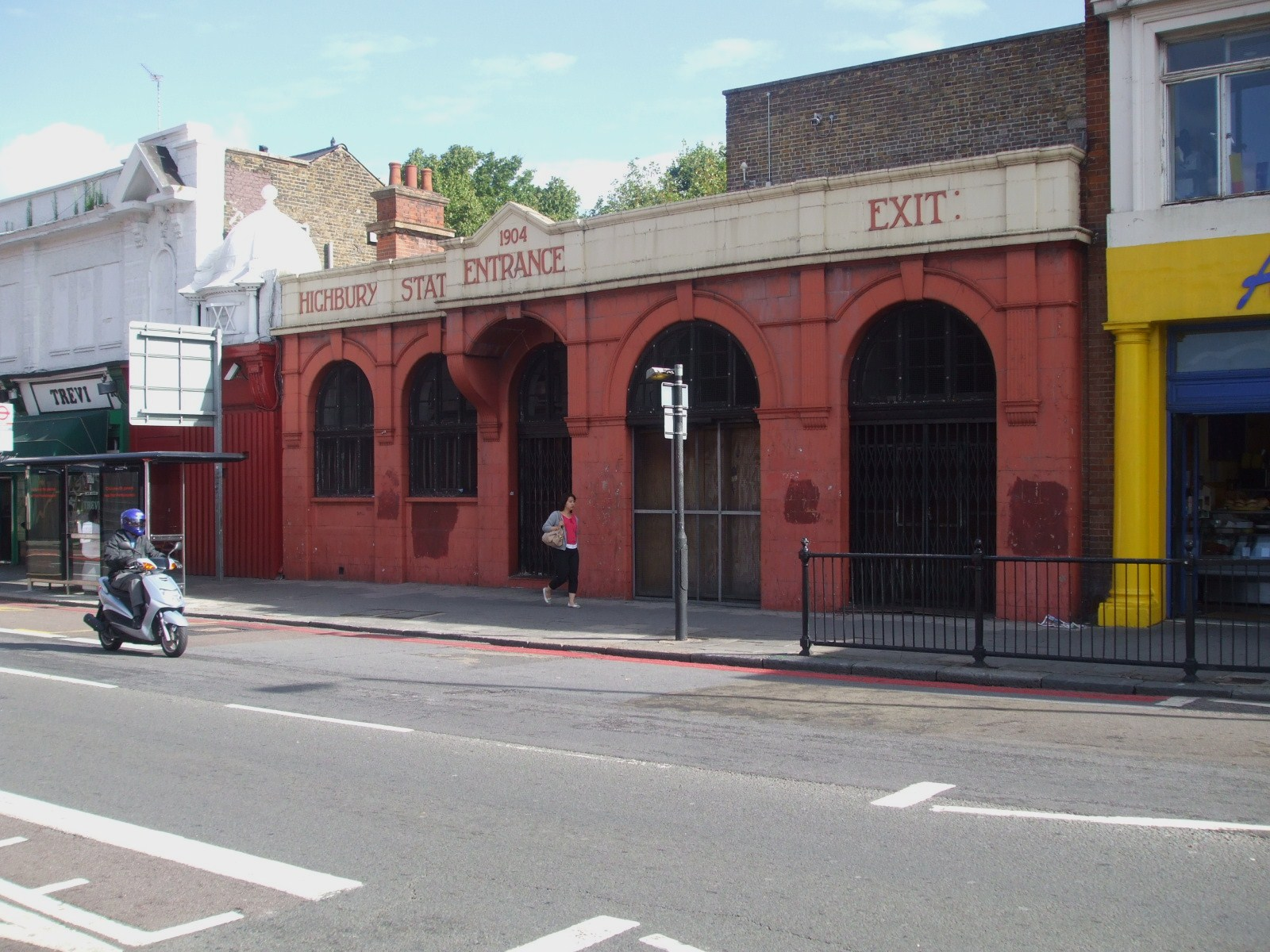
The GN&CR building (1904)

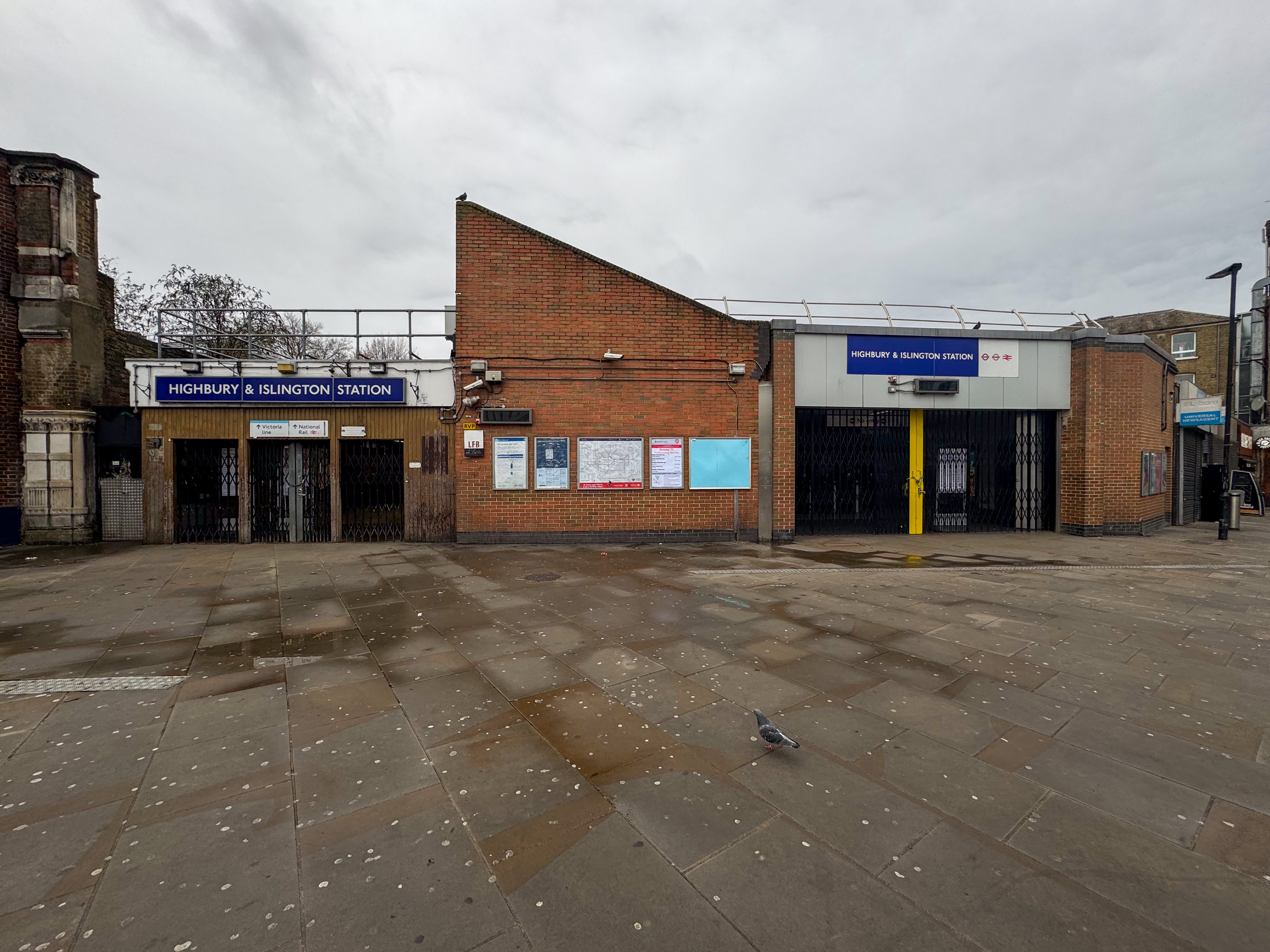
The 1960s building

The current station derives from two earlier stations. The first, which was on the same site, was a Victorian-gothic building, designed by Edwin Henry Horne, with a drive-in forecourt, opened on 26 September 1850 by the North London Railway (NLR) and called 'Islington'. Following reconstruction, it was renamed 'Highbury & Islington' on 1 July 1872.

The second station, on the opposite side of Holloway Road, was opened on 28 June 1904 by the Great Northern & City Railway (GN&CR) on its underground line between Finsbury Park and Moorgate. Opened as 'Highbury', it was renamed to 'Highbury & Islington' on 20 July 1922. This line and stations were operated by the Metropolitan Railway and its successors from 1913 until 1975 when the line, by then called the Northern City line, was transferred to British Rail. The route is now operated by Great Northern.

The NLR station was damaged by a V-1 flying bomb on 27 June 1944; however, its main building remained in use until it was demolished in the 1960s during the building of the Victoria line. The original westbound platform buildings remain, as does a small part of the original entrance to the left of the present station entrance.

The present single-storey structure was built in the 1960s for the opening of the Victoria line on 1 September 1968 and is the entrance for all lines. Previously only accessible by the two Otis lifts of the GN&CR building, a new escalator shaft to the deep level platforms created easier interchange with the NLR. In order to link the escalators to the new ticket hall, the shaft had to be constructed to run from the original lift landings at a relatively steep inclination under the Holloway Road. The lifts were taken out of service on 8 April 1968. When the escalators to the deep-level platforms were opened, the GN&CR station building was closed. Its disused entrance remains and was refurbished externally in 2006 – it houses signalling equipment for the Victoria line.

The Victoria line was built to give as many interchanges as possible with Underground and British Rail lines, with, wherever possible, cross-platform connection between different lines heading in the same direction. To this end, at Highbury & Islington the northbound Northern City line platform was reallocated to the southbound Victoria line to give a direct link between the two southbound platforms; a new northbound platform was constructed for each line; the northbound running NCL tunnel was diverted to its new platform; and the southbound Victoria line tunnel was joined to the old northbound NCL tunnel.

Between 14 May 1979 and 11 May 1985 the station was served by the Crosstown Linkline diesel multiple unit service between Camden Road and North Woolwich.

The former train operating company Anglia Railways ran services known as London Crosslink from Norwich to Basingstoke via Stratford, which called at Highbury & Islington. This service operated from 2000 until 2002.

To allow new four-car trains to run on the London Overground network, the North London line between Gospel Oak and Stratford was closed between February and May 2010 while a new signalling system was installed and 30 platforms were extended. During this closure, the Highbury & Islington station ticket hall was extended and step-free access installed on all of the London Overground platforms. The North London line reopened on 1 June 2010; however, the East London line platforms did not open until March 2011, whilst the Western Curve was reinstated, linking the station to Dalston Junction and the rest of the East London line.

== Platforms ==
Highbury & Islington has a total of eight platforms, divided between those that are on the surface and those that are deep level:

- Platform 1 – Windrush line (London Overground) services to Crystal Palace
- Platform 2 – Windrush line (London Overground) services to West Croydon (Clapham Junction on Sundays)
- Platform 3 – Northbound Victoria line (London Underground)
- Platform 4 – Northbound Northern City line (Great Northern)
- Platform 5 – Southbound Victoria line (London Underground)
- Platform 6 – Southbound Northern City line (Great Northern)
- Platform 7 – Westbound Mildmay line (London Overground)
- Platform 8 – Eastbound Mildmay line (London Overground)

=== Surface platforms ===
Platforms for Mildmay line (formerly NLL) and Windrush line (formerly ELL) services are operated by London Overground. On 1 June 2010, following the temporary closure of the route from February 2010 to May 2010, NLL services were rerouted to the newly built platforms 7 and 8 for the AC lines, which replaced the old "special use" platform. Platforms 1 and 2, which previously served the NLL route on third rail lines, were closed from February 2010 for reconstruction and reopened in 2011 for the ELL services. The change of platforms allows ELL services to operate without having to cross over NLL tracks. An island platform provides platforms 2 and 7; platforms 1 and 8 are side platforms. When the ELL extension to Clapham Junction was first instituted in December 2012, trains ran through to Clapham Junction from this station throughout the week. Following a timetable change in December 2014, they only do so on Sundays, with West Croydon the second destination served alongside Crystal Palace on weekdays & Saturdays.

=== Deep-level platforms ===
Platforms 3 to 6 are deep-level platforms. Platforms 3 and 5 are used for services on the Victoria line; 4 and 6 are used for Northern City line services.

== Services ==
=== London Overground ===
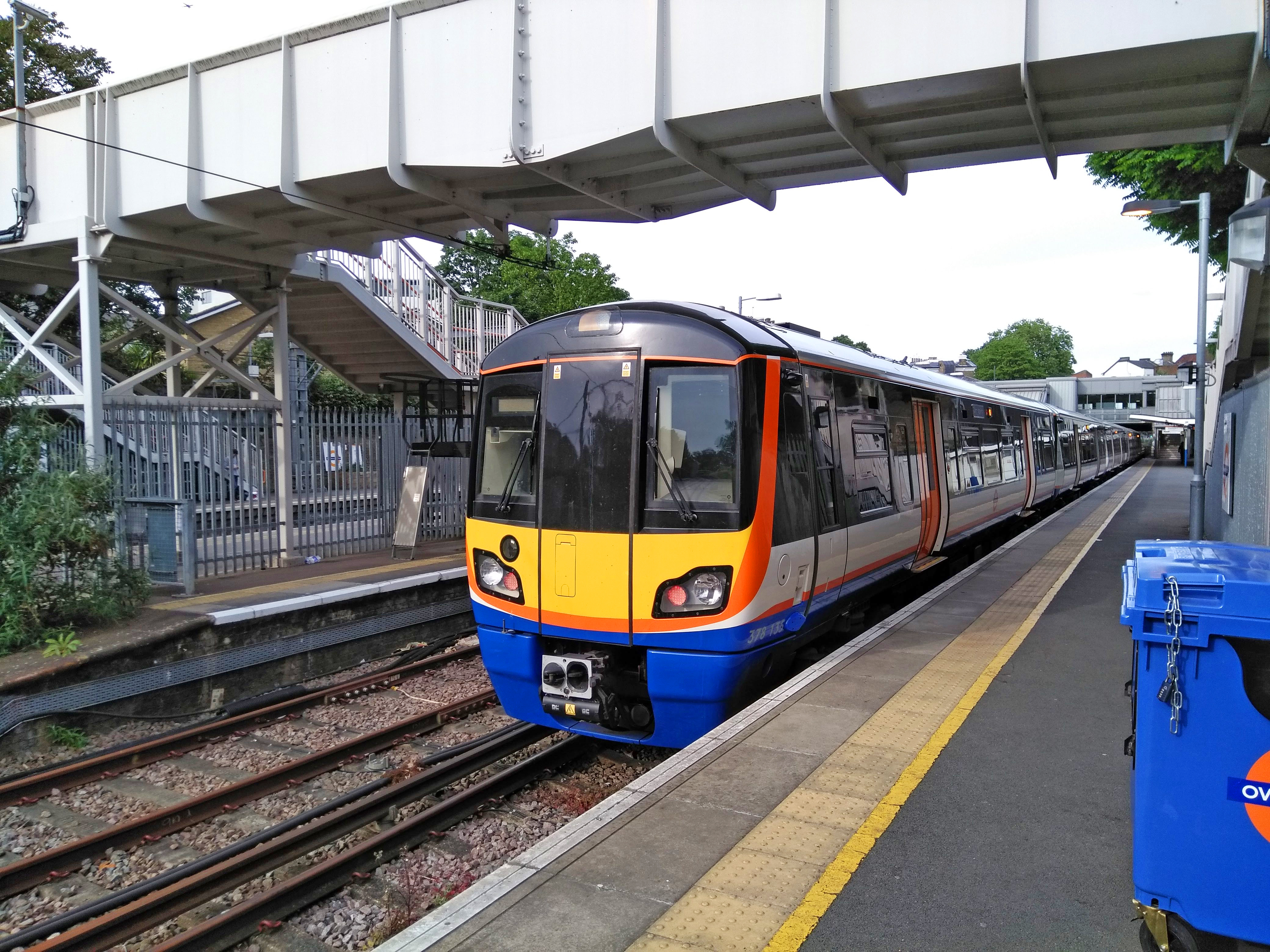
London Overground Class 378 in 2019

All times below are correct as of May 2016.

==== Mildmay line ====
On Mondays to Fridays there is a service approximately every 7–8 minutes throughout the morning and evening peaks, changing to roughly every 10 minutes off-peak. On Saturdays the service is approximately every 10 minutes. Sunday services are similar in frequency to the services on Saturdays.

==== Windrush line ====
On Mondays to Saturdays there is a service every 6–9 minutes throughout the day, while on Sundays before 13:00 there is a service every 15 minutes, changing after that to every 7–8 minutes until the end of service.

=== Great Northern ===
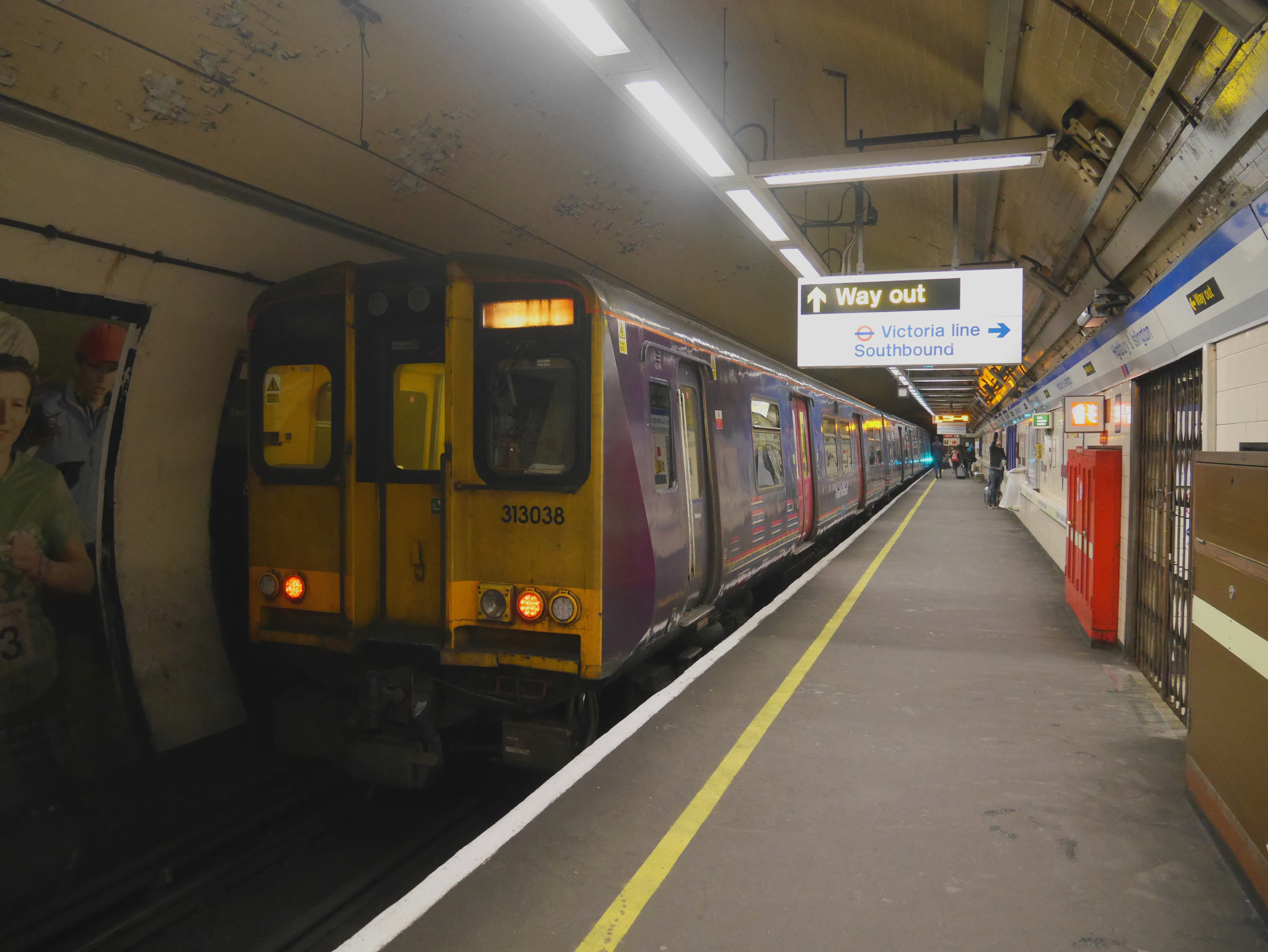
Great Northern Class 313 in 2017

On Mondays to Fridays there is a service approximately every 4–15 minutes until 10:00, when the frequency is every 15 minutes until 16:00, when the frequency again changes to between every 4–15 minutes until the end of service. Prior to December 2015, weekend and evening services were diverted to Kings Cross from Finsbury Park. Northbound trains run alternately to Welwyn Garden City and to Stevenage via Hertford North.

=== London Underground ===
==== Victoria line ====
Westbound there is a service every 2–5 minutes all day, all week. Eastbound there are services every 2–8 minutes all day, all week.

Preceding station	London Underground	Following station
King's Cross St Pancras towards Brixton	Victoria line	Finsbury Park towards Walthamstow Central
Preceding station	London Overground	Following station
Caledonian Road & Barnsbury towards Clapham Junction or Richmond	Mildmay line North London line	Canonbury towards Stratford
Terminus	Windrush line East London line	Canonbury towards Crystal Palace or West Croydon
Preceding station	National Rail	Following station
Drayton Park	Great Northern Northern City Line	Essex Road
Former Service
Camden Road or West Hampstead	Anglia Railways; London Crosslink	Stratford
Preceding station	London Underground	Following station
Drayton Park towards Finsbury Park	Metropolitan line Northern City Branch (1913-39)	Essex Road towards Moorgate
Drayton Park towards Finsbury Park	Northern line Northern City branch (1939-64)	Essex Road towards Moorgate
Drayton Park Terminus	Northern line Northern City branch (1964-75)	Essex Road towards Moorgate
Abandoned plans
Drayton Park towards Bushey Heath, High Barnet or Alexandra Palace	Northern line	Essex Road towards Moorgate

== Connections ==
London Buses routes 4, 19, 21, 30, 43, 263 and 393 and night routes N19, N41, N263, N271 and N277 serve the station.
