= Camden Road railway station =

London Overground station

Camden Road
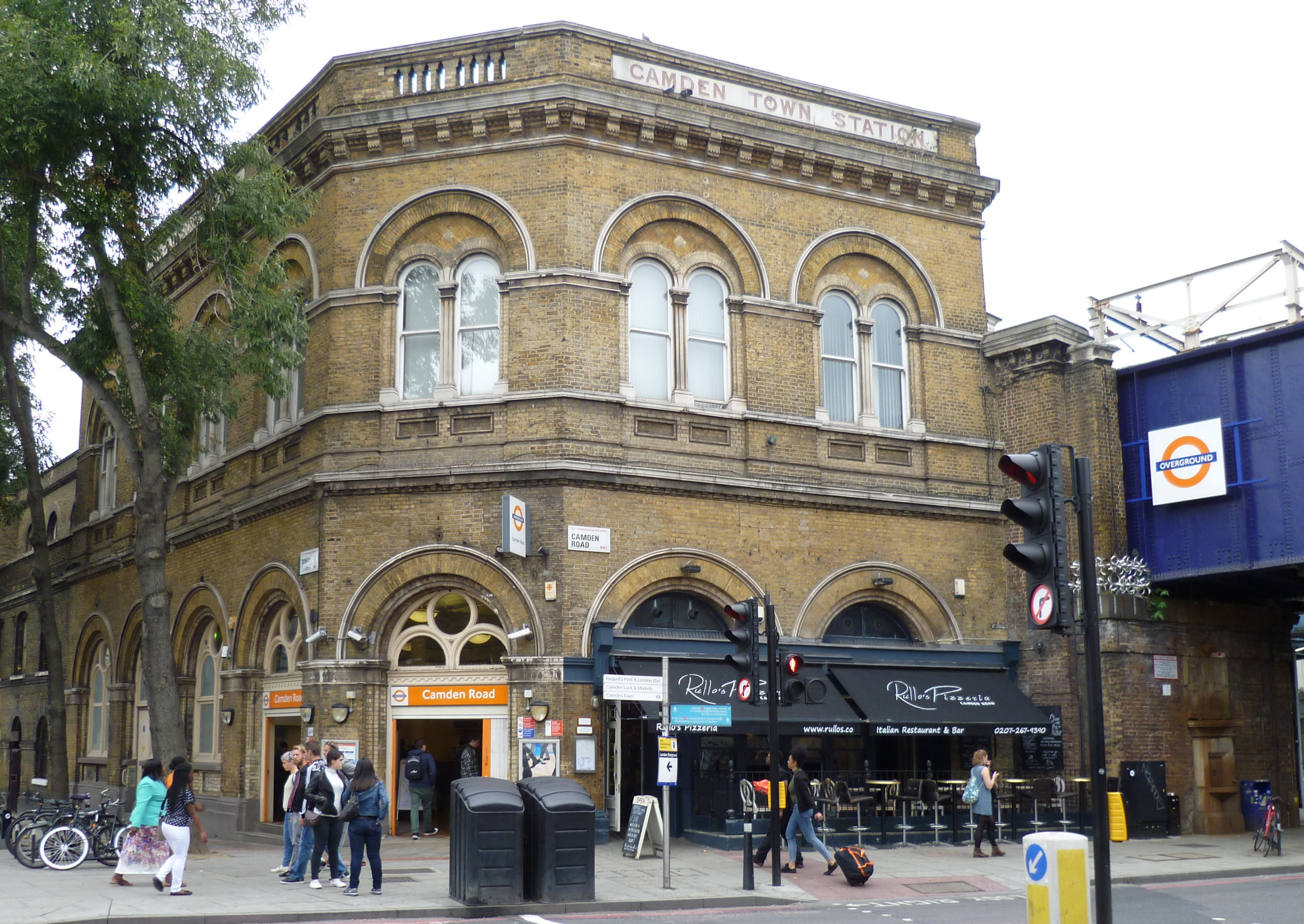
- Interactive map of Camden Road

General information
- Location: Camden Town
- Local authority: London Borough of Camden
- Managed by: London Overground
- Owner: Network Rail
- Station code: CMD
- DfT category: D
- Number of platforms: 2
- Accessible: Yes
- Fare zone: 2
- OSI: Camden Town

National Rail annual entry and exit
- 2020–21: ▼1.482 million
- Interchange: ▼5,983
- 2021–22: ▲3.071 million
- Interchange: ▲9,073
- 2022–23: ▲3.725 million
- Interchange: ▲11,725
- 2023–24: ▲4.291 million
- Interchange: ▼10,250
- 2024–25: ▲4.330 million
- Interchange: ▼5,740

Key dates
- 7 December 1850: first station opened
- 5 December 1870: resited
- 25 September 1950: Renamed (Camden Road)

Listed status
- Listed feature: Camden Road Station
- Listing grade: II
- Entry number: 1244154
- Added to list: 11 January 1999

Other information
- External links: Departures; Facilities
- Coordinates: 51.5418°N 0.1388°W

Camden Road is a station on the Mildmay line of the London Overground, located in the London Borough of Camden in north London. The station is situated in London fare zone 2. There is an official out-of-station interchange with Camden Town tube station on the Northern line of the London Underground, located a 390 metres (1,280 ft) walk away.

== History ==
The first Camden Road station was opened by the North London Railway in 1850 on the east side of what is now St. Pancras Way. It was renamed Camden Town on 1 July 1870, but closed on 5 December the same year when it was replaced by the current station, a short distance to the west.

Designed by Edwin Henry Horne, it opened as Camden Town by the North London Railway on 5 December 1870, but was renamed Camden Road on 25 September 1950 to avoid confusion with the London Underground Northern line Camden Town which had opened in 1907. Thus, between 1907 and 1950, there were two stations called Camden Town. It remains Horne's only station still operating as such.

Between 14 May 1979 and 11 May 1985 Camden Road was the western terminus of the Crosstown Linkline diesel multiple unit service to North Woolwich.

To allow four-car trains to run on the London Overground network, the North London line between Gospel Oak and Stratford closed in February 2010, and reopened on 1 June that year, in order to install a new signalling system and to extend 30 platforms. After the reopening the work continued until May 2011 with a reduced service and none on Sundays.

In November 2024 it was announced that toilets would be installed at the station.

== Design ==
The Edwin Henry Horne designed station is a Grade II listed building.

== Location ==
The station is at the corner of Royal College Street and Camden Road. The present Camden Town London Underground station is 450 metres (490 yd) to the southwest of this station. (Note: However, the accompanying 2008 photograph shows the original name ("Camden Town Station") still displayed on the parapet of the station building of what is now Camden Road station.) This is an official out of station interchange. London Buses routes 29, 46, 253 and 274 and night routes N29, N253 and N279 serve the station.

It is one of the few railway stations in England in which there is a police station.

== Services ==
The typical weekday service in trains per hour is:

- 4 westbound to Richmond via Willesden Junction
- 4 westbound to Clapham Junction also via Willesden Junction
- 8 eastbound to Stratford via Highbury & Islington.

There is now no normal passenger service on the line from Camden Road to Willesden Junction Low Level via Queens Park, though the route can be (and is) used if the line via Hampstead Heath is blocked for any reason.

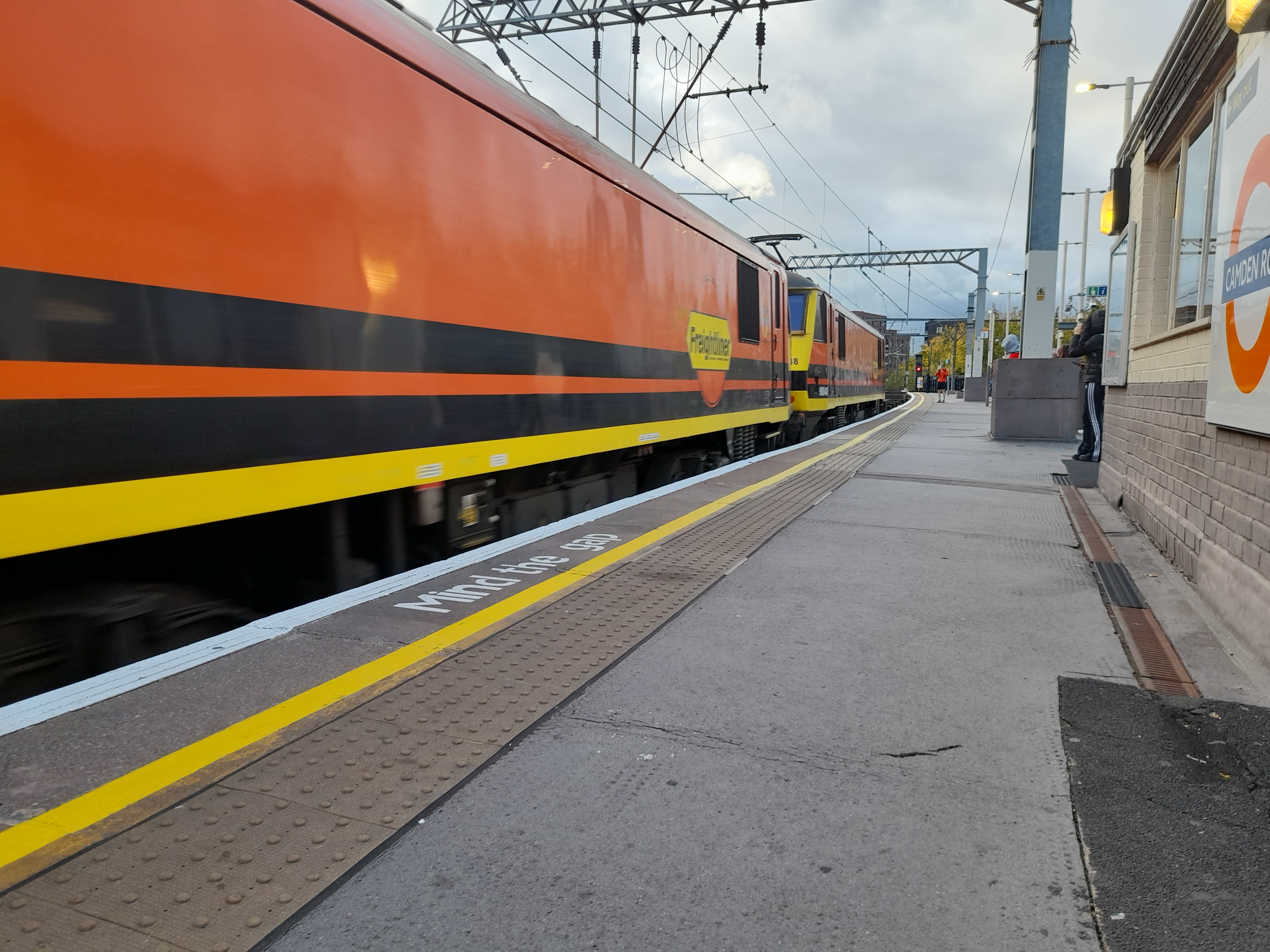
Pair of Freightliner locomotives travel east through Camden Road

In addition to the frequent local passenger service, the station is a busy location for freight traffic due to its proximity to the junctions linking the North London line to both the West Coast Main Line at Camden Junction (via the now closed station at Primrose Hill) and the East Coast Main Line at Copenhagen Junction. The former is particularly well used by container trains from the deep water ports at Felixstowe and Tilbury to various terminals in the Midlands and North West of England; it also carried a passenger service (between Watford Junction and Broad Street/Liverpool Street) until 1992.

== Proposals ==
=== Camden Highline ===
From 2015 to 2026, there was a proposal for a walking connection to and from King's Cross. The Camden Highline was a proposed public park and garden walk alongside the North London line. The project was abandoned in May 2026.

=== Potential reinstatement of platform 3 ===
Plans for the North London line upgrade originally included reinstatement of the two disused tracks through Camden Road station. In 2008 this was removed from the project to save costs and to ensure the upgrade would be completed in time for the 2012 Summer Olympics. In a London Rail Freight Strategy released by Network Rail in May 2021, proposed reinstatement of platform 3 as a through platform, with platform 2 becoming a turn back for a potential peak hour service from Camden Road to Stratford with potential to continue these during the off peak.

== Notes ==
Preceding station	London Overground	Following station
Kentish Town West towards Clapham Junction or Richmond	Mildmay line North London line	Caledonian Road & Barnsbury towards Stratford
Former services
Preceding station	National Rail	Following station
West Hampstead towards Basingstoke	Anglia Railways; London Crosslink	Highbury & Islington towards Norwich
Disused railways
Kentish Town West	North London-Watford Link (LNWR suburban system)	Maiden Lane
Primrose Hill	North London-Watford Link (LNWR suburban system)	Caledonian Road & Barnsbury
