= Ace Cafe =

Roadside entertainment venue in North London

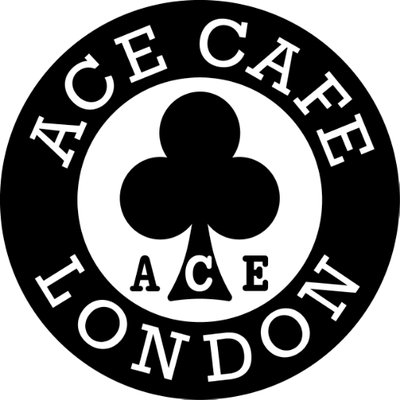

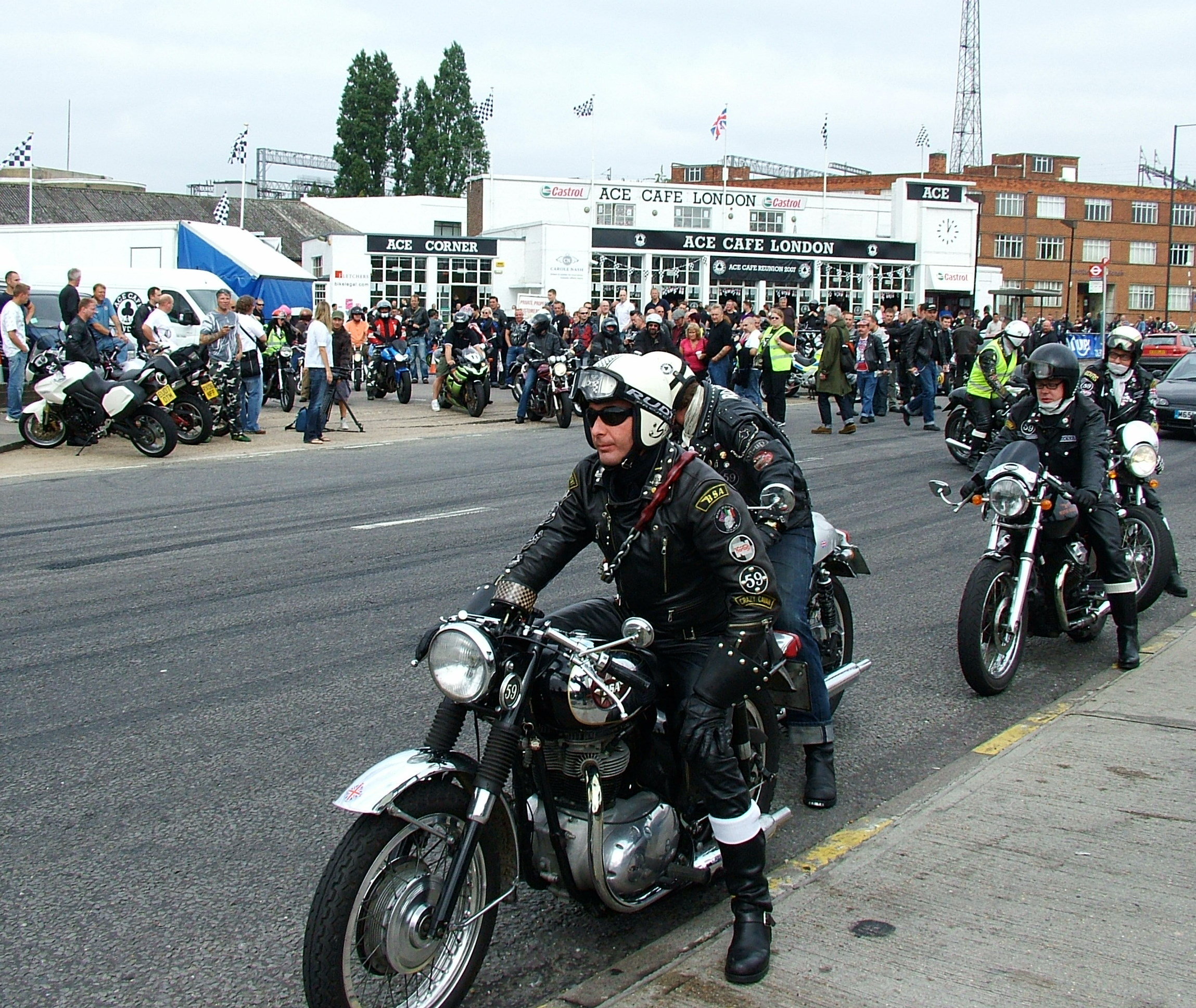
- A BSA rider at an Ace Cafe gathering in 2007

- Location within Greater London

Restaurant information
- Established: 1938
- Location: London
- Coordinates: 51.5412°N 0.2778°W
- Website: https://london.acecafe.com/

The Ace Cafe is a historic transport cafe located near Wembley, North West London, England. Situated next to the North Circular Road, it is historically a notable venue in motorcycle culture. The original cafe opened in 1938 and closed in 1969. It re-opened on the original site in 1997 as a cafe, functions, and entertainment venue.

== Location ==
The Ace Cafe is located on a leg on the western side of the North Circular Road, off the junction with Beresford Avenue. On the A406 it is between the Hanger Lane gyratory and the Wembley A404 junction. It is east of the Alperton neighbourhood, close by Stonebridge and the Park Royal industrial estate, just west of Stonebridge Park station and the Brent Viaduct.

Since 2011 Ace Cafe London have opened cafes in Lahti, Finland; Lucerne; Beijing, China; Barcelona, Spain and Orlando, US.

== History ==
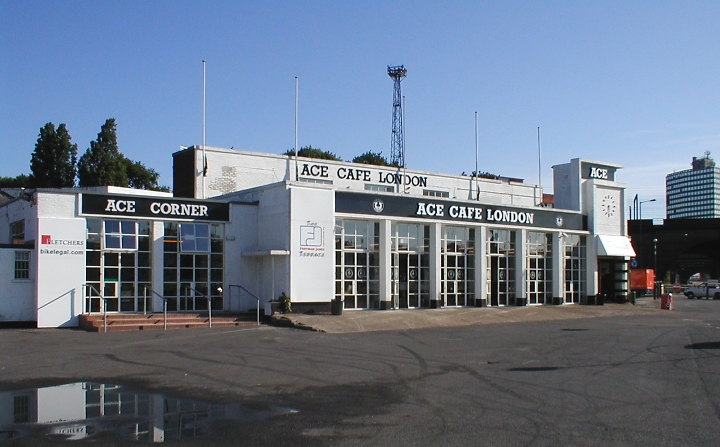
The Ace Cafe in 2004

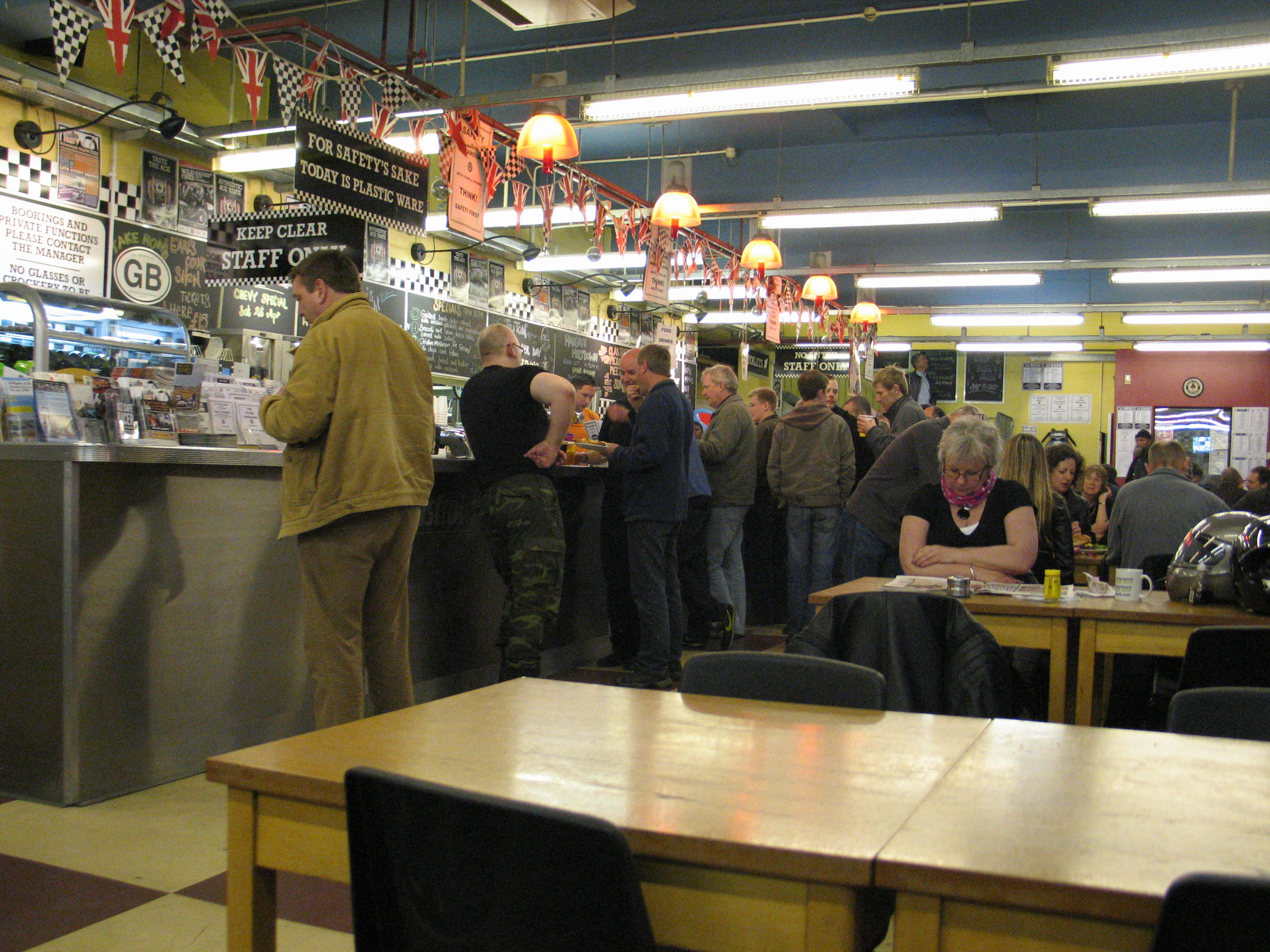
Interior of the cafe in 2008

The Ace Cafe opened in 1938 to accommodate traffic on the then-new North Circular Road. It was built on an area between the Grand Union Canal and Stonebridge Park Depot. The cafe was rebuilt in 1949, after an air raid on the nearby Willesden railway marshalling yards caused damage during the Second World War. Events in the postwar environment made the Ace a success: the emergence of teenage motorcyclists and an increase in traffic. As the cafe was open 24 hours a day, young people started to meet at the cafe to socialise with their motorcycles, and listen to rock'n'roll on juke boxes. Several bands and motorcycle enthusiast groups were formed at the Ace Cafe. During its heyday in the 1950s and 1960s, it would attract large groups of rockers in the evening and at weekends. Biker Reverend Bill Shergold would visit the cafe and invite young people to join his 59 Club, a motorcycle group that promoted "positive values".

The cafe closed in 1969, shortly after the opening of Scratchwood Services (now London Gateway services) at what was then the southern end of the M1 motorway. The ground floor of the building became a tyre sales and fitting shop. The first floor was occupied by a vehicle delivery company. By 1994, a renewed interest in the rocker culture led to an Ace Cafe reunion, organised by Mark Wilsmore with support from original 59 Club members. The cafe reopened in 1997, with complete refurbishment completed by September 2001. Rockers and motorcyclists from various countries attend themed meetings. It is no longer open 24-hours but the cafe now has an extensive calendar of events for both motorbike and classic car owners, hosting events such as monthly meets for both bikes and cars, as well as being licensed for weddings and civil partnerships.

== Film and media ==
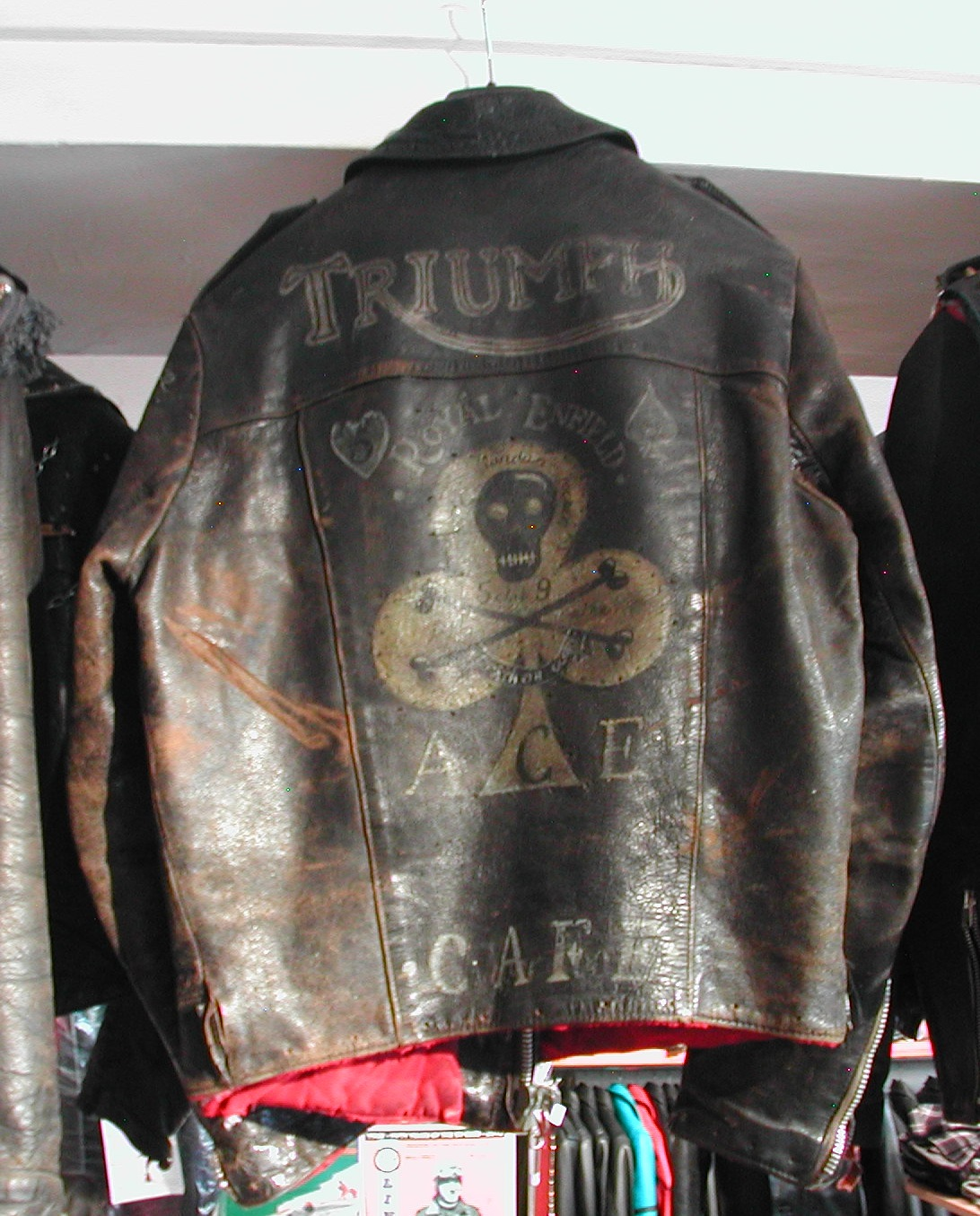
Customised Lewis Leathers motorcycle jacket with Ace Cafe details

The Ace Cafe was used as a location in the 1964 film The Leather Boys, Sidney J. Furie's British gay-interest kitchen sink drama, starring Rita Tushingham.

In the past it has been used for the Channel 5 TV programme Fifth Gear in the seasons 10 to 13 (September 2006 until March 2008), and for ITV programme Used Car Roadshow. It has also featured in the BBC television series By Any Means with Charley Boorman; mentioned as a favourite for Ewan McGregor by his wife in the documentary, Long Way Down; and the 2008 film Freebird.

The cafe also featured in an edition of Car SOS – Series 1, Episode 9, presented by Tim Shaw, filmed during 2012 and shown in the UK on at least one TV channel – National Geographic. The episode depicted the secret restoration of a decaying Ford Zodiac Mk1, which was then unveiled and presented to the unsuspecting owner in the car park, close to the building entrance.

Motoring TV presenters Edd China and Mike Brewer filmed at Ace Cafe on a Hot Rod night in early 2014 during a sequence to sell a Chevrolet Camaro, part of Wheeler Dealers series 11.

The music video for "You Go Your Way" (released 2024) by Perrie was filmed at Ace Cafe.

== Awards ==
The Ace Cafe won London Borough of Brent's "Best Bar None" award for local bars in 2009.

== See also ==
- Biker bar
- List of restaurants in London
