= Tokyngton =

Archaic name for part of Wembley, London

Coordinates: 51.5476°N 0.2770°W

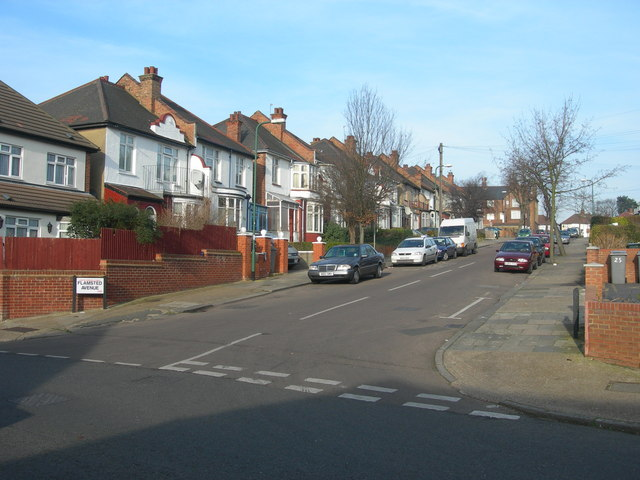
- Junction of Tokyngton Avenue

- Location within Greater London
- Population: 15,105 (2011 Census. Ward)
- OS grid reference: TQ175855
- London borough: Brent
- Ceremonial county: Greater London
- Region: London
- Country: England
- Sovereign state: United Kingdom
- Post town: WEMBLEY
- Postcode district: HA9
- Dialling code: 020
- Police: Metropolitan
- Fire: London
- Ambulance: London
- UK Parliament: Brent West
- London Assembly: Brent and Harrow

Tokyngton, also locally known as Monks Park, is a locality that forms the southeastern part of the town of Wembley in Greater London, in the London Borough of Brent, England.

Most refer to it as being either Wembley or Stonebridge, as the name Tokyngton is historical and out of favour, hardly used by locals and not noted as a destination on road signs, except for street names and public places bearing the name. Tokyngton was first mentioned in 1171, its name meaning "the farm of the sons of Toca". However the name does officially survive as an electoral ward of Brent London Borough Council.

The name Monks Park which is often used locally derives from the Neeld family, money lenders to King George III, who owned land in the then village of Tokyngton and lived away at a place called Monk's Park in Corsham, Wiltshire.

Today the area covers part of the Harrow Road (A404) and the residential neighbourhood north of it, directly to the south and southeast of Wembley Stadium (separated from it by the Chiltern Main Line tracks). It is also west of Neasden's St Raphael's Estate (separated by Tokyngton Recreation Ground and the River Brent) and northeast of Alperton (separated by the Stonebridge Park Depot and its accompanying rail tracks). The A406 North Circular Road passes to the southeast.

Tokyngton is served by two stations: Stonebridge Park on the Bakerloo and Watford DC Lines, and Wembley Stadium on the Chiltern Main Line.

== Locale ==
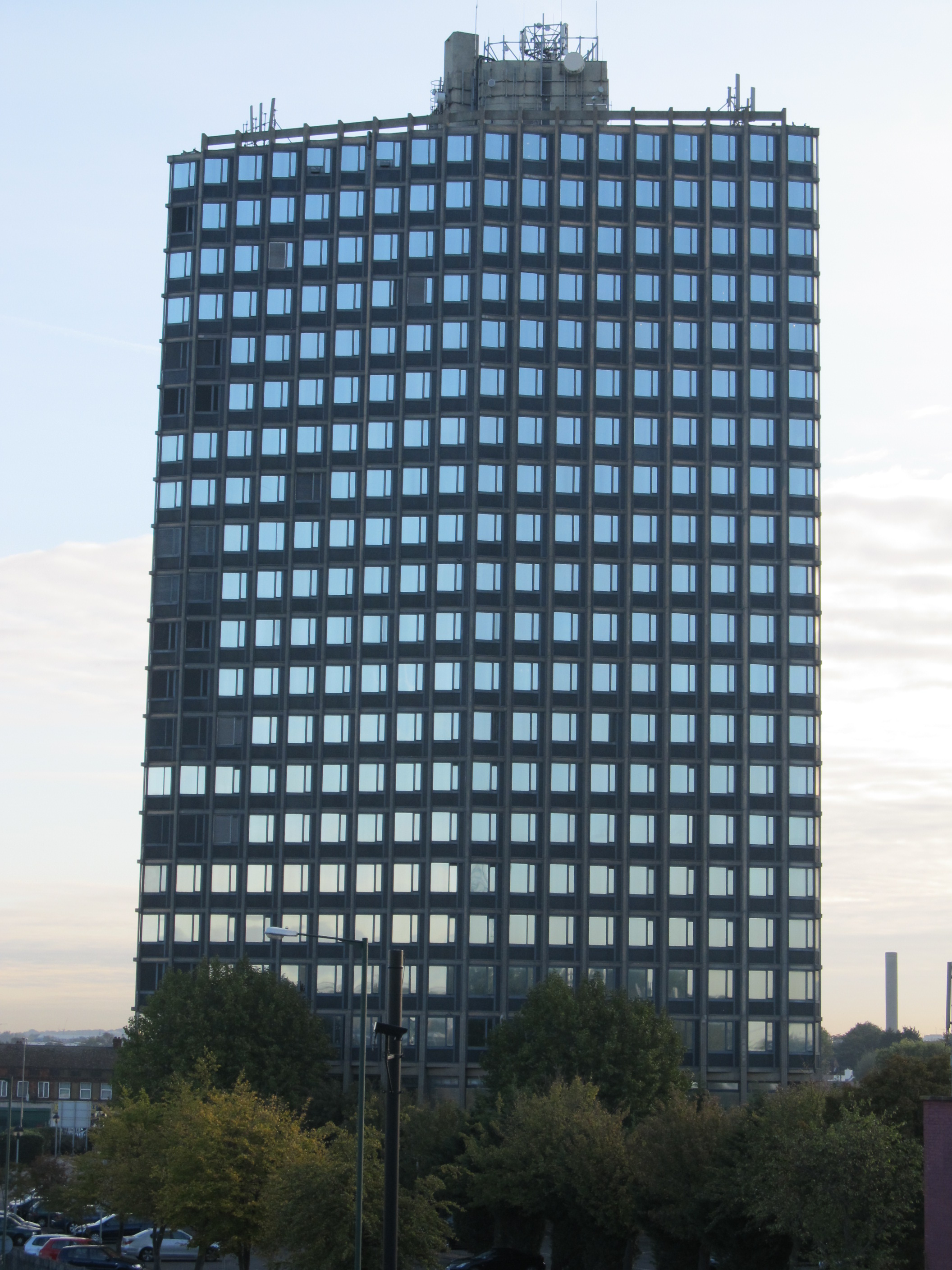
The Wembley Point building, located next to Stonebridge Park station

The area mostly consists of Edwardian terraces and 1930s semi-detached housing. There are three schools in the area: Oakington Manor Primary School in the northeast, and Elsley Primary School and St Joseph's Catholic Junior School in the west. There is also a community centre within Sherrans Farm Open Space in the north of the area, close to Wembley Stadium. Tokyngton Library, in the southeast, closed in 2011.

== Sport and leisure ==
Tokyngton has a non-League football team, Tokyngton Manor F.C., which plays at Spratleys Meadow.

== Politics and government ==
Tokyngton is part of the Brent West constituency for elections to the House of Commons of the United Kingdom, currently represented by Barry Gardiner from the Labour Party.

Tokyngton is part of the Tokyngton ward for elections to Brent London Borough Council.
