= Willesden Brent Sidings =

Train stabling point in Willesden, Brent, England

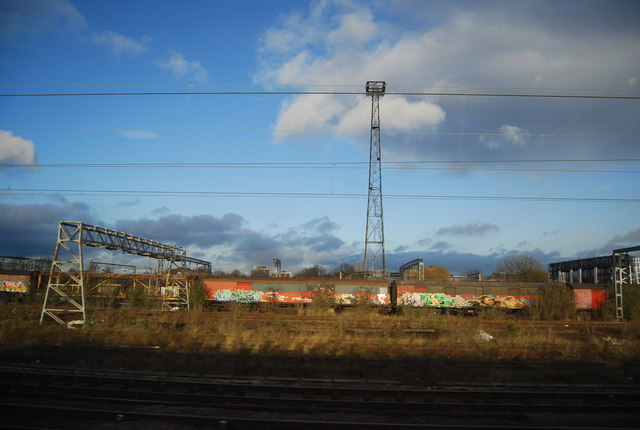
- The railway sidings seen from the West Coast Main Line
- Interactive map of Willesden Brent Sidings

Location
- Location: Willesden, London Borough of Brent
- Coordinates: 51.5386°N 0.2656°W
- OS grid: TQ205835

Characteristics
- Owner: DB Schenker
- Depot code: WE (1973 -)
- Type: Diesel

Willesden Brent sidings is a marshalling yard and stabling point located in Willesden, London Borough of Brent, England. The sidings are situated on the eastern side West Coast Main Line and to the west of Willesden Junction station, between the station and Wembley Yard. The area is also situated between Stonebridge Park and Harlesden stations on the Watford DC line and the Bakerloo line.

The depot code is WE.
