= Wembley Intercity Depot =

Railway maintenance depot in Wembley, London

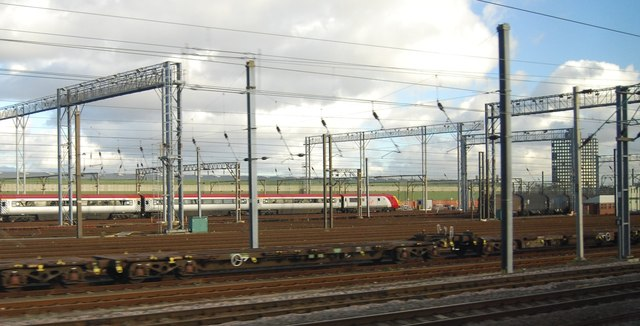
- Interactive map of Wembley Intercity Depot

Location
- Location: Wembley, London Borough of Brent
- Coordinates: 51.5462°N 0.2834°W
- OS grid: TQ190845

Characteristics
- Owner: Network Rail
- Operator: Alstom
- Depot code: WB
- Type: EMU, Electric

Wembley Intercity Depot (alternatively, Wembley Brent Depot) is an Electric Traction Depot located in Wembley, London Borough of Brent, England. The depot is situated alongside Wembley Yard, on the eastern side of the West Coast Main Line, to the south of Wembley Central station.

The depot code is WB.

Part of the depot was originally known as Stonebridge Park Depot, which is also the name of the adjacent London Underground facility. Stonebridge Park station, on the Watford DC and Bakerloo lines, is to the immediate south-east and Willesden Brent Sidings are across the A406 North Circular Road, also to the south-east.

== Allocation ==
As of 2020, the depot's allocation consists of Avanti West Coast Class 390 Pendolinos and Caledonian Sleeper Class 92 electric locomotives and Mark 5 carriages.
