= Willesden Junction station =

London Underground and London Overground station

Willesden Junction
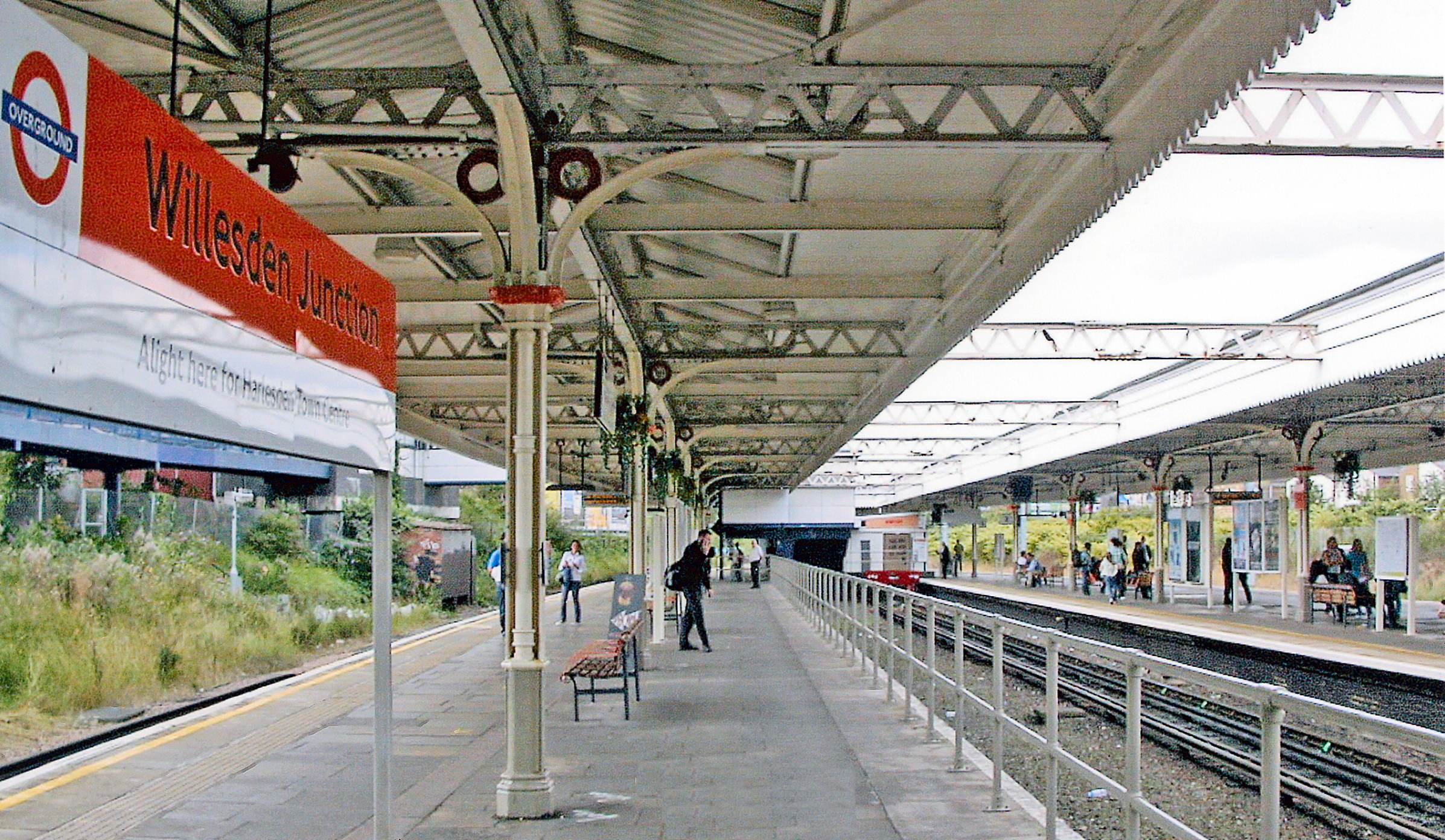
- London Overground platform at the station
- Interactive map of Willesden Junction

General information
- Location: Harlesden
- Local authority: London Borough of Brent
- Managed by: London Overground
- Owner: Network Rail
- Station code: WIJ
- DfT category: C2
- Number of platforms: 5
- Accessible: Yes
- Fare zone: 2 and 3

London Underground annual entry and exit
- 2020: ▼3.99 million
- 2021: ▼2.63 million
- 2022: ▲4.41 million
- 2023: ▼4.32 million
- 2024: ▲4.41 million

National Rail annual entry and exit
- 2020–21: ▼2.756 million
- Interchange: ▼0.855 million
- 2021–22: ▲5.358 million
- Interchange: ▲1.583 million
- 2022–23: ▲6.368 million
- Interchange: ▲1.973 million
- 2023–24: ▲6.878 million
- Interchange: ▲2.501 million
- 2024–25: ▲7.042 million
- Interchange: ▼2.425 million

Railway companies
- Original company: London & North Western Railway
- Post-grouping: London Midland & Scottish Railway

Key dates
- 1837: Tracks laid
- 1 September 1866: Opened
- 10 May 1915: Watford DC line and BS&WR commenced

Other information
- External links: TfL station info page; Departures; Facilities
- Coordinates: 51.53266°N 0.24547°W

Willesden Junction (/ˈwɪlzdən ˈdʒʌŋkʃən/) is an interchange station at the intersection of the North London and Watford DC lines in Harlesden, north-west London, England. It provides Bakerloo line services of the London Underground, and the Lioness and Mildmay line services of the London Overground. The station is located close to the Old Oak Lane conservation area in the East Acton ward.

== History ==
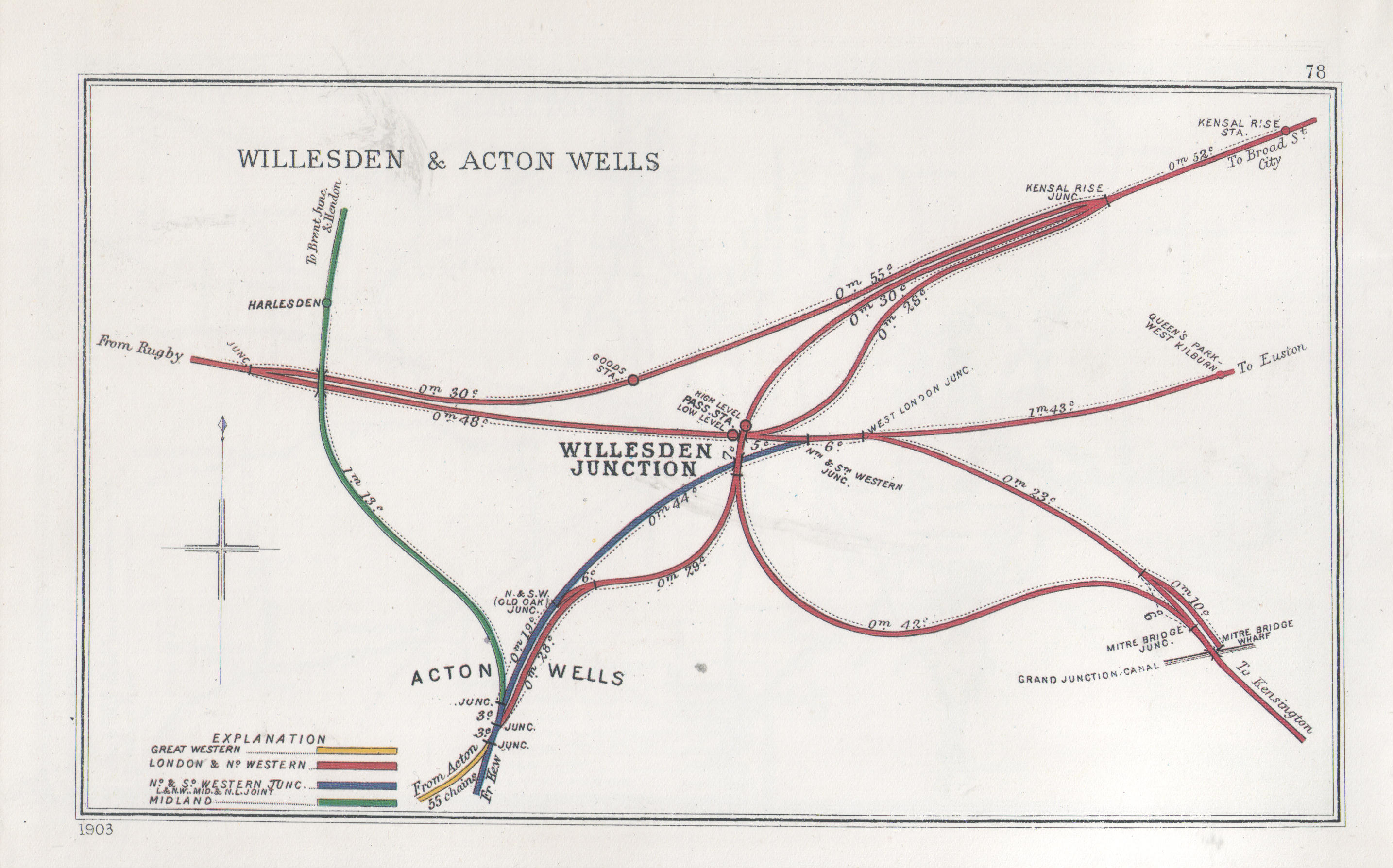
Willesden Junction in 1903. The pre-1866 Willesden station (near the site of Harlesden station) was on the red line to the west, just beyond the green Midland Railway Dudding Hill Line

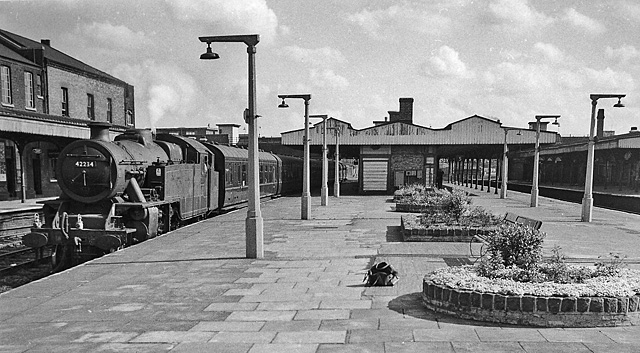
Willesden Junction main line station - end of platform view in 1962 looking towards Euston

The station developed on three contiguous sites: the West Coast Main Line (WCML) station was opened by the London & North Western Railway (LNWR) on 1 September 1866 to replace the London and Birmingham Railway's Willesden station of 1841 which was 0.5 miles (0.8 km) to the north-west. Passenger services ended in 1962 when the platforms were removed during the electrification of the WCML, to allow the curvature of the tracks to be eased. Later the bridges for the North London line (NLL) were rebuilt.

The high-level station on the NLL was opened by the North London Railway in 1869 for two Richmond tracks and later for two Shepherds Bush tracks, both crossing the WCML roughly at right angles. In 1894, a new combined high-level station was built, with an island platform plus a third shorter platform for Earls Court trains (which was later removed) together with a new station entrance building which still survives. By 1897, 199 passenger trains and 47 goods trains passed through the high-level station each day.

The 'Willesden New Station', or low-level station, on the Watford DC line was opened in 1910, to the north of the main line with two outer through platforms and two inner bay platforms at the London end. The bay platforms were originally long enough for four-coach Bakerloo trains when such trains ran outside peak times, but were shortened in the 1960s when a new toilet block was installed. In more recent times, the platform buildings have been reconstructed and the bay length increased, due to the addition of a fourth and then a fifth coach to Class 378 electric multiple units (EMUs).

In 1896, staff totalled 271, including 79 porters, 58 signalmen (in 14 signal boxes), and 58 shunters and yard foremen. They issued 1,006,886 tickets to passengers in 1896, up from 530,300 in 1886. Many of them were housed in what is now the Old Oak Lane conservation area, built by the LNWR in 1889 and which included an Institute, reading room and church.

The main line platforms were numbered from the south side (including one or two on the Kensington route), followed by the high level platforms and then the DC line platforms which thus had the highest numbers. Later, the surviving platforms were renumbered.

A freight liner terminal was opened in August 1967. It was built on an 18-acre site of the steam locomotive depot alongside the main electrified rail-link. It was opened by John Morris, Parliamentary Secretary for the Ministry of Transport. The terminal had the capacity to handle 2,000 containers a week.

In the late nineteenth century, it was nicknamed "Bewildering Junction" or "The Wilderness" because it contained such a maze of entrances, passages and platforms.

== Major accidents ==
The following accidents have occurred at or near to the station:

- On 5 December 1910, a passenger train was in a rear-end collision with another at the station. Five people were killed and more than 40 were injured; the accident was due to a signalling error.
- In June 1936, one first-class passenger was killed and four other passengers were injured on the main line track, just north of the station. An LMS passenger train heading to Watford was struck by a piece of equipment sticking out of the milk train heading to London Euston.
- On 6 October 1986, a Class 313 EMU collided with the rear of a stationary Bakerloo line train, on the up line to the east of the station between the Scrubbs Lane overbridge and Kensal Green tunnel (the location was officially described as "Kensal Green"). 23 of 25 passengers were injured, all but one were discharged from hospital during the same evening.

== The station today ==
There are no platforms on the West Coast Main Line, which is separated from the low-level station by the approach road to Willesden Traction Maintenance Depot, which lies immediately south-east of the station.

The high-level (HL) station consists of an island platform, rebuilt in 1956, with faces as platforms 4 and 5, which are roughly at the level of Old Oak Lane to the west of the station, serving the NLL and the West London line (WLL). Some trains on the latter reverse in a central turnback siding on the NLL to the east of the station, which opened in 2011. Both platforms have been extended across the DC line to accommodate four-coach Class 378 trains. The HL station previously had a third platform on the eastern side which was used by services to/from Earls Court. There is another turnback siding further east which was previously used; it was laid in the late 1990s to allow Royal Mail trains to reach its depot at Stonebridge Park.

The low-level station, at the level of the area to the south, is an Edwardian island platform, with outer faces as platforms 1 and 3 and northern bay platform bay as platform 2; the southern bay now has no track. In October 2014, the DC line was closed temporarily between Wembley Central and Queen's Park reportedly by Network Rail to allow platform 2 to be extended further west as a through platform. Most of the original and later platform buildings were demolished, when platform 2 was extended in preparation for longer Class 378 EMUs, with provision of a new footbridge and lift in 1999.

Platforms 1 and 3 are used by Bakerloo line services, which began on 10 May 1915, and London Overground services between Euston and Watford Junction. Until May 2008, northbound Bakerloo line trains, which were to reverse at Stonebridge Park depot (two stations further north), ran empty from Willesden Junction although the southbound service began at Stonebridge Park. This imbalance arose as there were no London Underground staff beyond Willesden Junction to oversee passenger detrainment, but this changed after London Underground took over the staffing of stations on the line, including Stonebridge Park, from Silverlink in November 2007, and trains bound for Stonebridge Park depot now terminate at Stonebridge Park station. Normally only the first and last NLL trains of the day, which start or terminate here, use the bay platform; it is used for empty stock transfers between the depot and the North London and Gospel Oak to Barking lines.

The station signs on the platforms state: "Alight for Harlesden town centre" below the Overground roundel.

=== Motive power depot ===
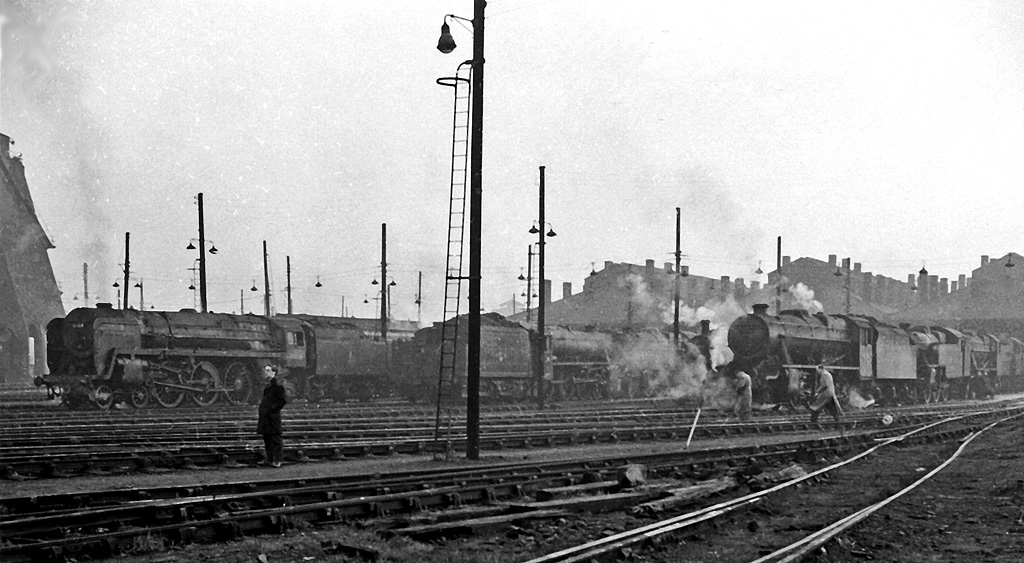
The original motive power depot in 1962

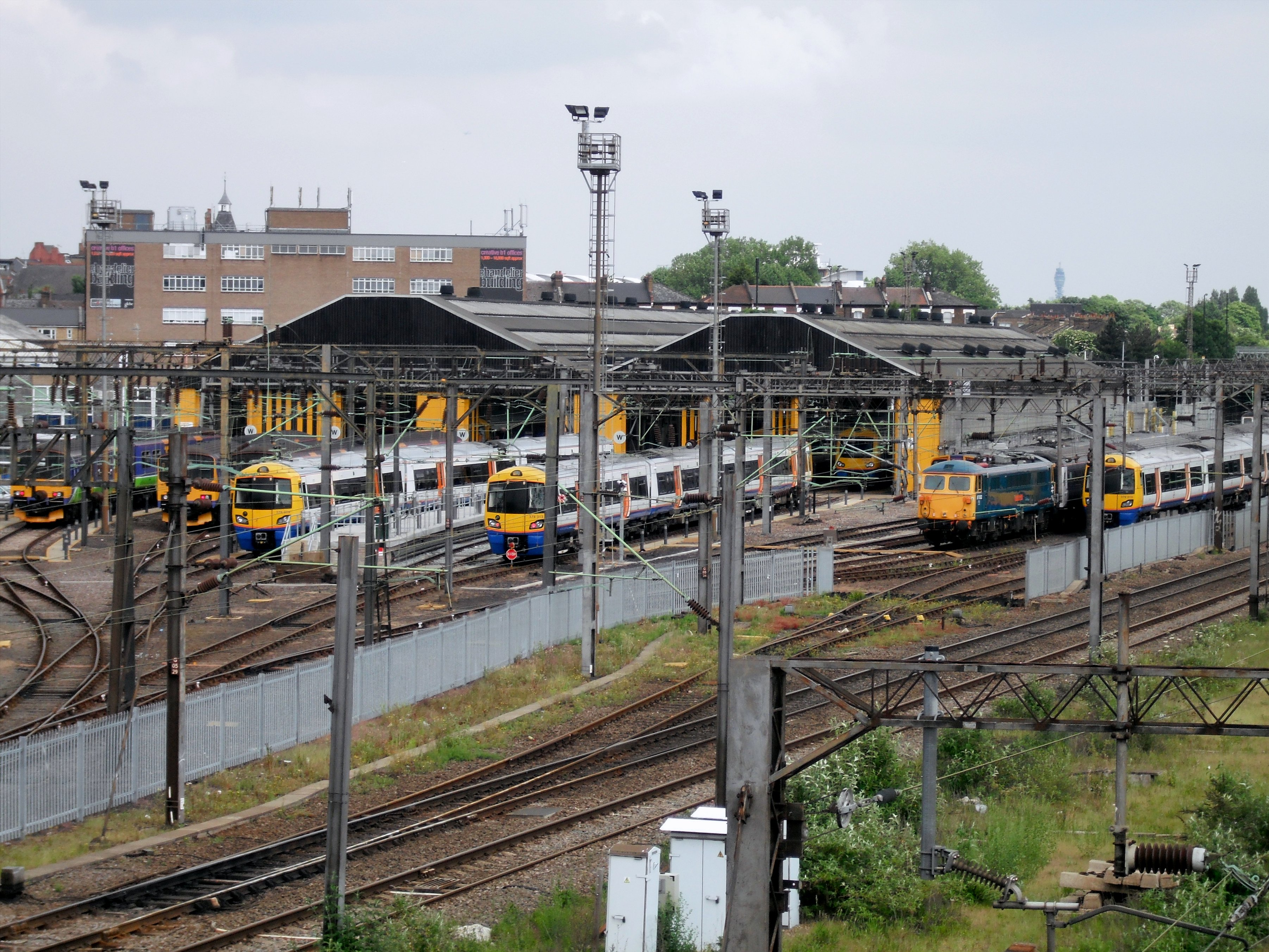
Willesden Traction Maintenance Depot

The LNWR opened a large locomotive depot on a site on the south side of the main line to the west of the station, in 1873. This was enlarged in 1898. The London Midland and Scottish Railway opened an additional roundhouse on the site in 1929. Both buildings were demolished when the depot was closed in 1965 by British Railways and replaced by a Freightliner depot.

The steam depot had the shed code 1A and was a major depot for predominantly freight locomotives used on the West Coast Main Line and for suburban passenger services from Euston.

The servicing of predominately electric locomotives and electric multiple units was then undertaken by the present Willesden TMD on the other side of the line, following the West Coast Main Line's electrification in the 1960s. Its depot code is WN.

== Services ==
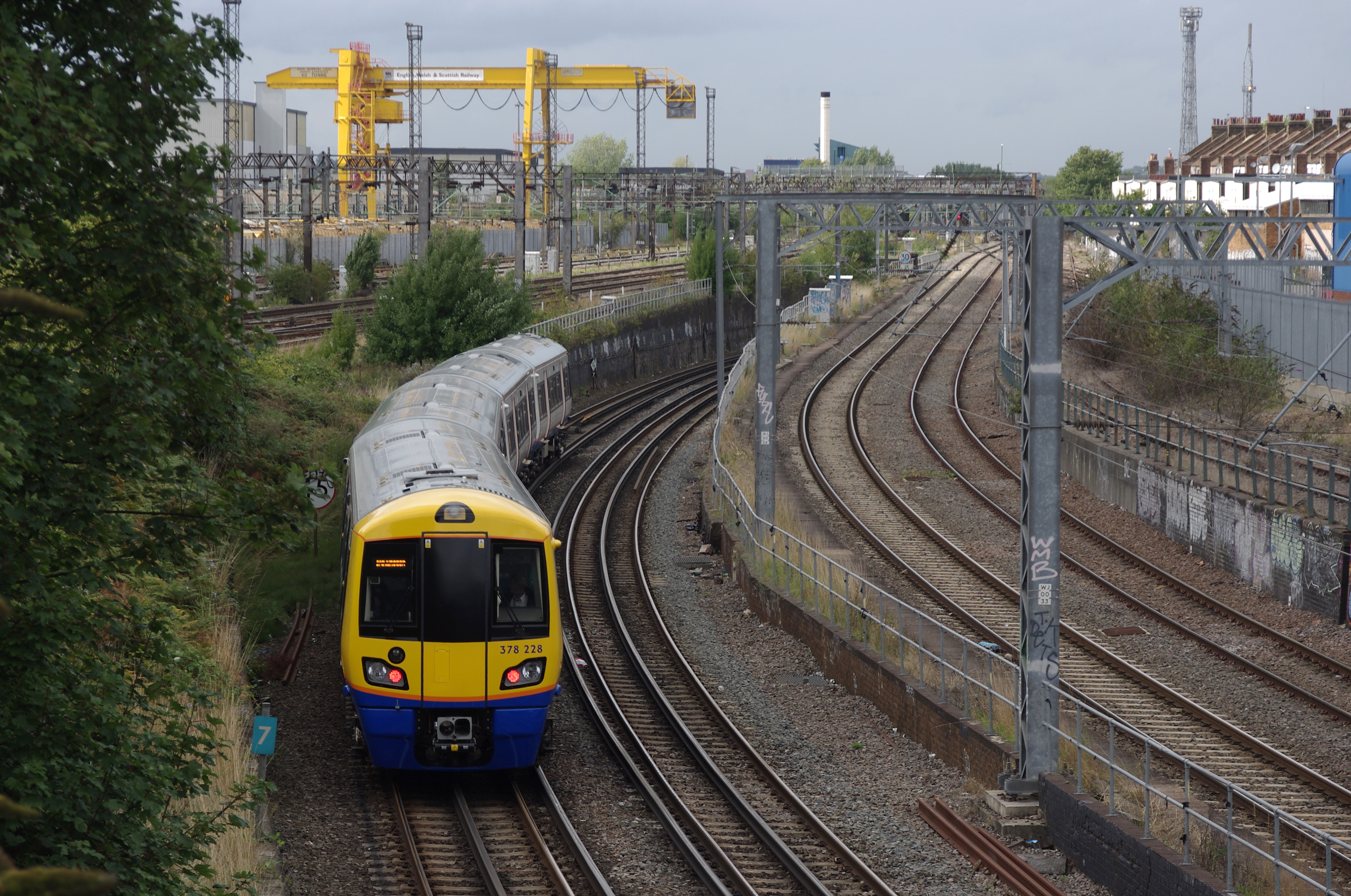
A London Overground service departs from Willesden for Watford Junction

London Overground operates Mildmay line services from the high-level station on the North London Line using Class 378 EMUs. The weekday off-peak service in trains per hour (tph) is:

- 8 tph to Stratford
- 4 tph to Richmond
- 4 tph to Clapham Junction.

London Overground also operates Lioness line services from the low-level station on the Watford DC line using Class 710 and Class 378 EMUs. The weekday off-peak service is:

- 4 tph to London Euston
- 4 tph to Watford Junction.

London Underground operates Bakerloo line trains on the Watford DC line using 1972 Stock. The weekday off-peak service is:

- 8 tph to Elephant & Castle
- 4 tph to Stonebridge Park
- 4 tph to Harrow and Wealdstone.

Preceding station	London Underground	Following station
Harlesden towards Harrow & Wealdstone	Bakerloo line	Kensal Green towards Elephant & Castle
Preceding station	London Overground	Following station
Acton Central towards Richmond	Mildmay line North London line	Kensal Rise towards Stratford
Shepherd's Bush towards Clapham Junction	Mildmay line West London line	Kensal Rise towards Stratford
Harlesden towards Watford Junction	Lioness line Watford DC line	Kensal Green towards Euston
Historical railways
Wembley Central	London and North Western Railway West Coast Main Line	Queens Park (London)
Brentford	Anglia Railways London Crosslink	West Hampstead

== Bus connections ==
The station area is served by London Buses routes 18, 220, 228, 266, 487 and night route N18.
