= Willesden railway station =

Former railway station in London

Coordinates: 51.5353°N 0.2572°W

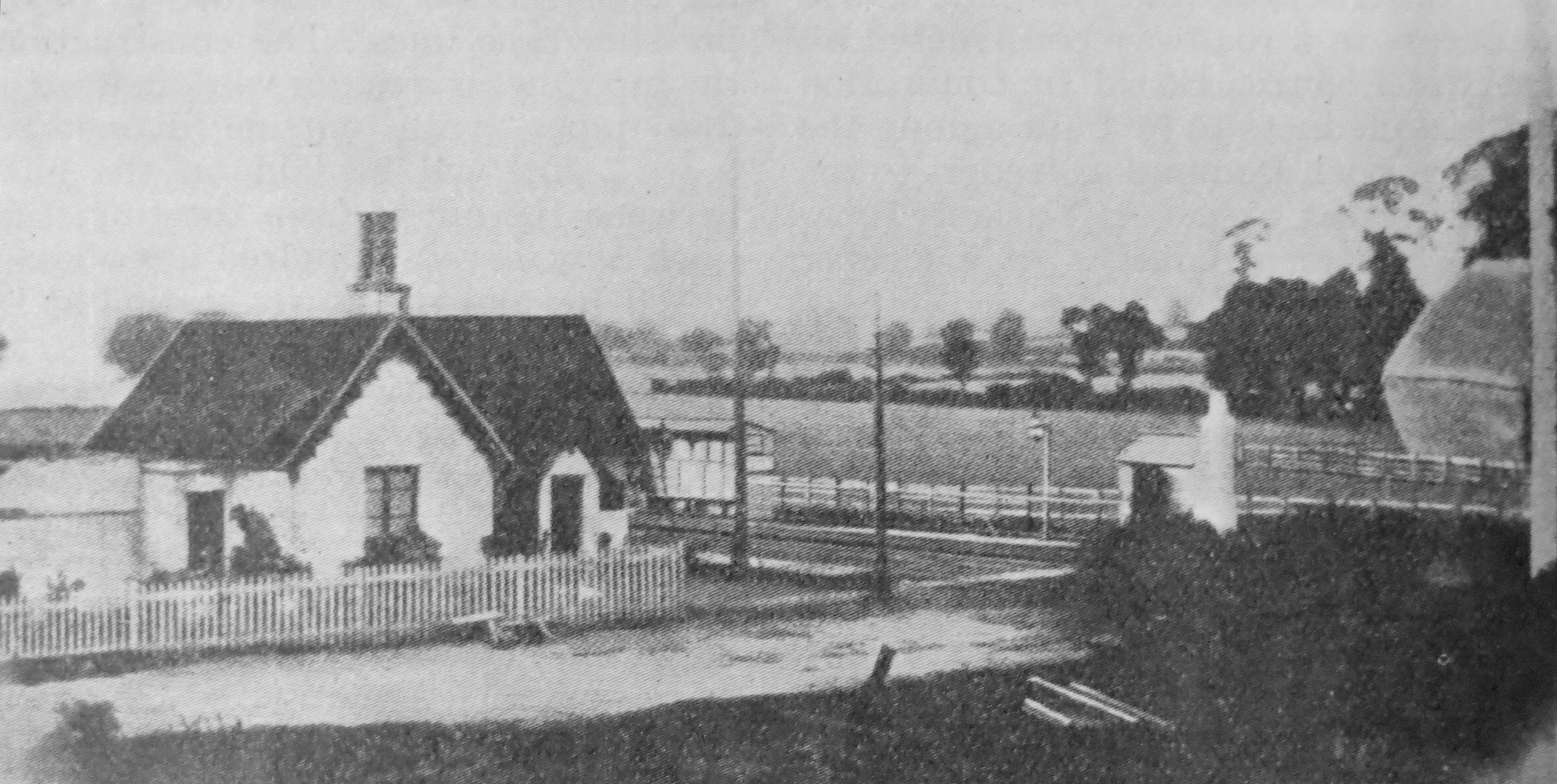
Willesden station and Acton Lane level crossing

Willesden railway station was a station about 50 yards (46 m) north of Acton Lane level crossing in Harlesden, Middlesex, opened in 1841 by the London and Birmingham Railway (L&BR) on what became the West Coast Main Line (WCML). It had wooden platforms about 50 yards (46 m) (5 coach lengths) long beside each of the two tracks, a small wooden ticket office with an awning and a coal siding. It was about 3/4 mile (1.2 km) south of the original village of Willesden, in what is now the London Borough of Brent. It closed later the same year, reopened in 1844 and closed finally when the L&BR's successor, the London and North Western Railway (LNWR), opened Willesden Junction station about 1/2 mile (0.8 km) to the southeast on 1 September 1866. On 15 June 1912 the LNWR opened a new station, known as Harlesden, near the site.
