= Harlesden station =

London Underground and London Overground station

Harlesden
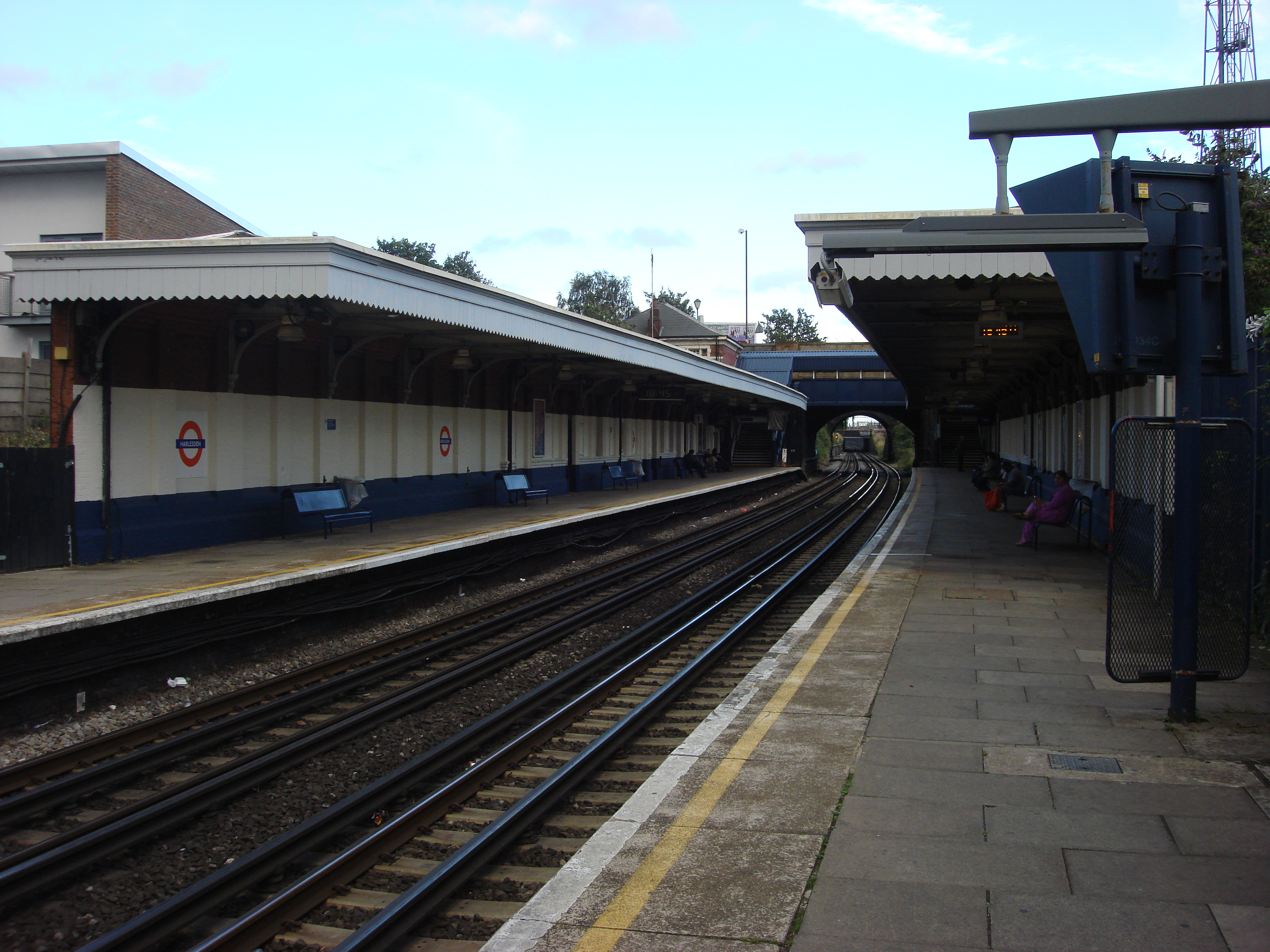
- Northbound platform at the station
- Interactive map of Harlesden

General information
- Location: Harlesden
- Local authority: London Borough of Brent
- Managed by: London Underground
- Owner: Network Rail
- Station code: HDN
- DfT category: E
- Number of platforms: 2
- Fare zone: 3

London Underground annual entry and exit
- 2021: ▼1.55 million
- 2022: ▲2.33 million
- 2023: ▲2.47 million
- 2024: ▲2.59 million
- 2025: ▼2.43 million

National Rail annual entry and exit
- 2020–21: ▼0.734 million
- 2021–22: ▲1.271 million
- 2022–23: ▲1.310 million
- 2023–24: ▲1.409 million
- 2024–25: ▲1.553 million

Key dates
- 15 June 1912: Opened

Other information
- External links: TfL station info page; Departures; Facilities
- Coordinates: 51.5364°N 0.2578°W

Harlesden (/ˈhɑːrlzdən/) is an interchange station on Acton Lane, in north-west London, England. It is on the Bakerloo line of the London Underground and the Lioness Line of the London Overground, between Stonebridge Park and Willesden Junction stations.

== History ==
Willesden was the first station at the site, which was opened in 1841 by the London and Birmingham Railway; it was closed in 1866, replaced by Willesden Junction station, 0.5 miles (0.80 km) to the south east.

In the Watford DC line programme of new electrified suburban tracks of the London and North Western Railway, a new station, Harlesden, opened on 15 June 1912. Bakerloo line services on the same tracks began on 16 April 1917, via a new junction at Queens Park. The Watford Junction to Euston modernisation project was completed in 1922.

== Location ==
The railway line here is the border between the Harlesden and Stonebridge residential area in the east, and the Park Royal industrial estate to the west. The southern end of Willesden Brent Sidings separates the station from the West Coast Main Line.

== Services ==
London Overground (Lioness line) operates regular services between Watford Junction and London Euston.

London Underground (Bakerloo line) operates regular services between Harrow & Wealdstone and Elephant & Castle.

Preceding station	London Overground	Following station
Stonebridge Park towards Watford Junction	Lioness line Watford DC line	Willesden Junction towards Euston
Preceding station	London Underground	Following station
Stonebridge Park towards Harrow & Wealdstone	Bakerloo line	Willesden Junction towards Elephant & Castle

== Connections ==
London bus routes 187, 206, 224, 226, 228, 260 and 487 also serve the station.

== Future ==
Transport for London has proposed building a new London Overground station adjacent to the existing station as part of the planned West London Orbital line. The new station would provide interchange with Overground services running from Brent Cross West, via Old Oak Common, to Hounslow.
