= Park Royal Partnership =

British urban regeneration partnership

Park Royal Partnership (PRP) was an urban regeneration partnership, promoting the economic development of Park Royal, London, Europe's largest industrial area.

The Park Royal Partnership (limited company No. 02702122) was dissolved on 07/07/2014 The linked companies Park Royal Workforce (limited company No. 5500391) and Brent Business Venture (limited company No. 01775481) are also dissolved.

== Activities ==
Map of the Park Royal area in north-west London

Park Royal is located north of roughly the half-way point between Heathrow airport and central London. The industrial and business estate is home to more than 2000 businesses and 40,000 employees.

Since the early 1990s, the PRP has been responsible for driving inward investment and business growth. It states:

In recent years, PRP has overseen more than £100 million of public and private sector investment, contributing directly to new business creation and growth, creating and safeguarding employment and regenerating the area's property and transport infrastructure.

Park Royal Partnership is funded by the private sector through subscriptions from its business members, and by its public sector partners, for whom the PRP acts as a delivery agent for regional and local public policy. The company is run by an independent board of directors drawn from the private, public and not-for-profit sectors.

The Park Royal Partnership Group is made up of three companies:

- Park Royal Partnership
- Park Royal Workforce
- Brent Business Venture

which work together to coordinate a range of business services. These include business growth and start-up support, networking, training and recruitment, as well as transport and environmental improvements.

In 2007, the PRP proposed an orbital, limited-stop bus service around Park Royal called "Fastbus". They claimed that Fastbus would improve orbital transport connections in Brent. A new road in Park Royal, near the Diageo 'First Central' business park, has been built with bus lanes, in anticipation of the new service. However as of mid-2009, there has been no support for the proposal by Transport for London.
