= Park Royal =

Area of West London, England

Coordinates: 51.529088°N 0.281267°W

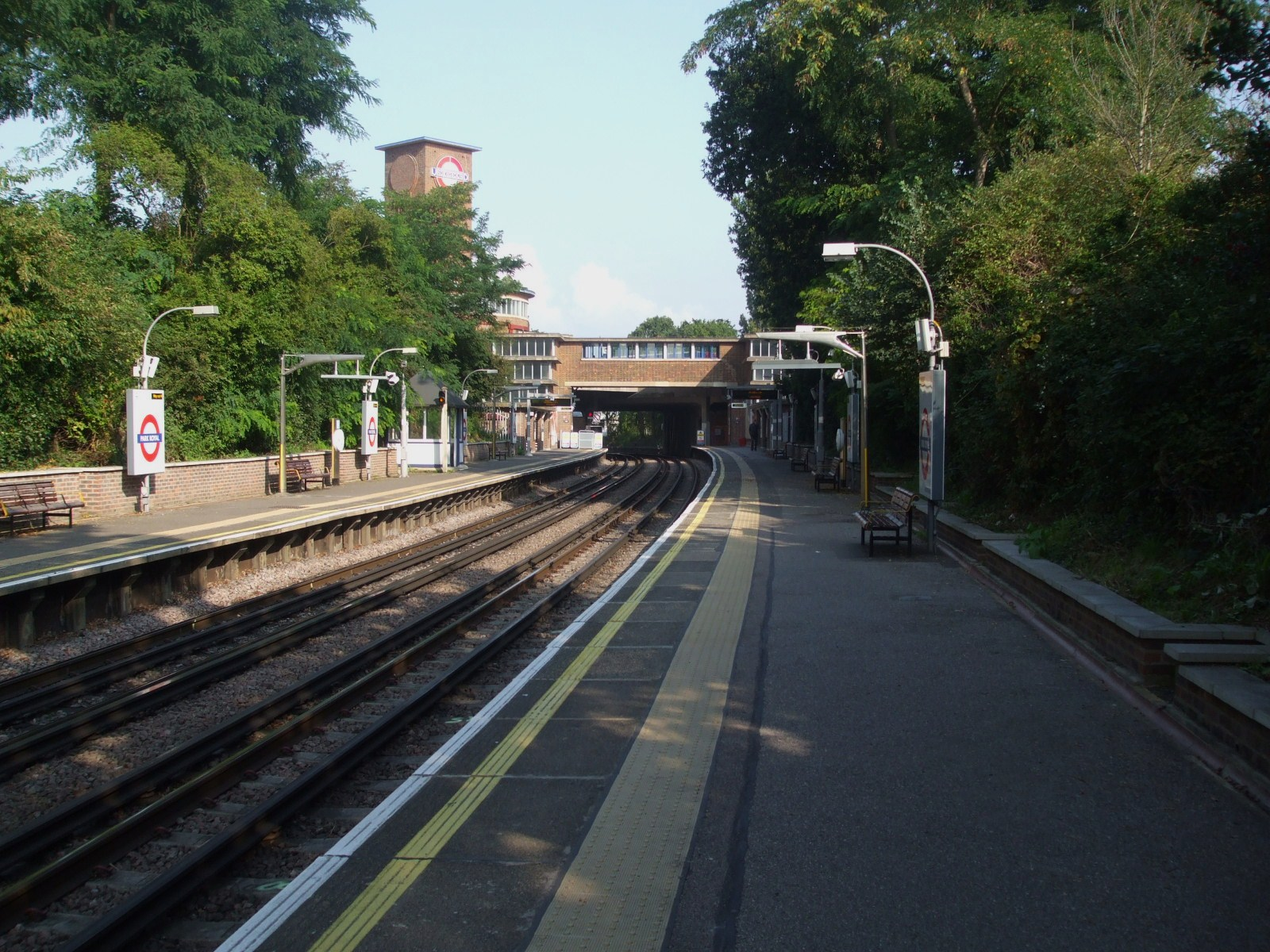
- Park Royal station

- Location within Greater London
- OS grid reference: TQ195828
- London borough: Ealing; Brent
- Ceremonial county: Greater London
- Region: London
- Country: England
- Sovereign state: United Kingdom
- Post town: LONDON
- Postcode district: NW10
- Postcode district: W3
- Dialling code: 020
- Police: Metropolitan
- Fire: London
- Ambulance: London
- UK Parliament: Brent East; Ealing Central and Acton
- London Assembly: Ealing and Hillingdon; Brent and Harrow

Park Royal is an area in West London, England, divided between the London Borough of Ealing and the London Borough of Brent.

It is the site of the largest business park in London, but despite intensive existing use, the area is, together with adjacent Old Oak Common, intended to become the UK's largest regeneration scheme. This arises from the area's relatively central location and also the strong and improving transport links which will include (at Old Oak Common), HS2 and the Elizabeth line. The scale of redevelopment has led to the Park Royal and Old Oak area being described as a potential "Canary Wharf of West London".

== Location ==
Map of Park Royal Business Park (OpenStreetMap)

To the north of Park Royal is Harlesden in the northeast, West Twyford, an outlying area of Ealing, in the northwest, and a Network Rail depot at Stonebridge Park in the far north, which also has London Underground Bakerloo line tracks running through it (and Harlesden station nearby). On the eastern side, Park Royal is bounded by Acton Lane and Park Royal Road (B4492). The Central Middlesex Hospital is located here.

The Grand Union Canal runs through the middle of the Park Royal industrial estate, with pedestrian access via the towpath.

== History ==
The name Park Royal derives from the short-lived showgrounds opened in 1903 by the Royal Agricultural Society as a permanent exhibition site for the society's annual show. After only three years the society sold the site, and returned to a touring format for its shows. Part of the area was used as an airfield between 1910 and 1913. During World War One munitions factories were located on Park Royal Road and Victoria Road: one of the factories employed 7,000 workers, mainly women. The district was bombed in 1917.

With its road, rail and canal links, Park Royal was subsequently developed for industrial use, mainly during the 1930s. For many years it was a centre of engineering, with firms including Park Royal Vehicles, GKN and Landis and Gyr.

Queens Park Rangers F.C. played on two grounds in Park Royal. The first was the Horse Ring, later the site of the Guinness brewery, which had a capacity of 40,000. When the Royal Agricultural Society sold the grounds in 1907, QPR moved to the Park Royal Ground, 400 yards (370 m) south, an almost exact replica of Ayresome Park, with a capacity of 60,000. The club was forced to move out in February 1915 as the ground was taken over by the Army.

On 12 December 1908, the first ever rugby league test match between Great Britain (playing as the Northern Union) and Australia took place at the Park Royal Ground in front of 2,000 fans. The match ended in a 22-all draw and was played as part of the first ever Kangaroo Tour.

The Guinness Brewery opened in 1936. It was designed by Sir Giles Gilbert Scott and Alexander Gibb. The Guinness company built homes for its workers in the surrounding area, naming the streets after people and places connected with the Guinness family, such as Iveagh Avenue and Moyne Place. The Brewery buildings were demolished in 2006.

The Guinness Sports Club hosted some of the hockey events for the 1948 Summer Olympics.

== Economy and redevelopment ==
=== Existing ===
It is the site of the largest business park in London, occupying about 1,200 acres (490 ha). Park Royal business park has over 1,200 businesses, employing an estimated 35,000 workers. Approximately 500 food companies operate at Park Royal, employing more than 14,000 people.

Park Royal also has areas of residential housing and amenities serving them. Park Royal Business Park is promoted commercially by the Park Royal Partnership, which is part of West London Business.

On the southern side beyond the arterial Western Avenue (A40), which leads to the Hanger Lane Gyratory System, is the Royale Leisure Park, which contains a Warner & Vue group cinema (which closed in June 2020 due to Covid-19 regulations reopened as Multi Screen ODEON Luxe Acton (2022–Present): Odeon acquired and refurbished the nine-screen site, reopening it on August 18, 2022), restaurants, arcade and a bowling alley. There is also a B&Q superstore, Renault and Nissan Car Dealerships previously 1926–1980s: Renault’s UK Factory and Assembly Base, then Dealership until closure 2022, giving way at a Data Centre (now under construction 2026), a Wren Kitchens (ex Staples Superstore) and other industrial buildings comprising the southern half of Park Royal.

Park Royal Underground station, on the Piccadilly line, is located just off Western Avenue. To the west of Park Royal is Hanger Hill and the North Circular Road (A406).

As well as many small industrial firms, Park Royal is the location of some large company buildings, including McVities and Heinz. The old Guinness brewery and sports ground site at the south-western extremity of the district has now been demolished, however the rail sidings are still in use for aggregate freight traffic supplying the Lafarge Tarmac depot. The first building erected adjacent to the new roundabout and bridge link to Western Avenue is occupied by international drinks company Diageo, owner of the Guinness brand and the redevelopment site. The Female Health Company, which manufactures Femidoms, has one of its two manufacturing plants here, too.

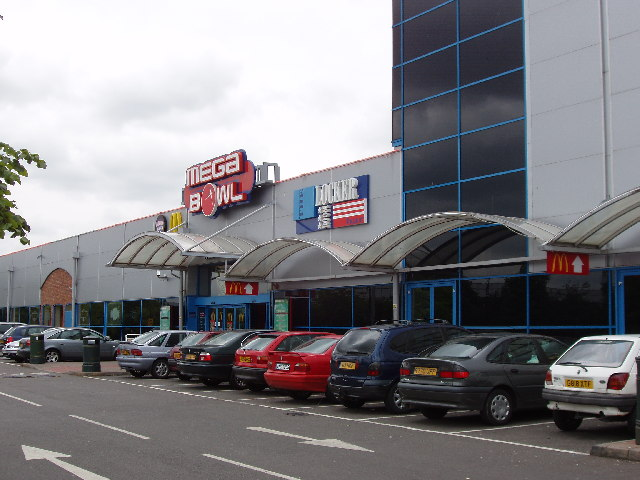
Royale Leisure Park

It is public policy to maintain Park Royal as predominantly a business area. It is designated as an Opportunity Area, and in 2008 the Mayor of London's office published a draft Planning Framework which aspires to maintain, "growing economic clusters of food/drink, transport/logistics and television/film." The framework does not preclude use of parts of the site for housing.

In summer 2011, the London Borough of Hammersmith and Fulham launched a Park Royal City plan for Old Oak Common, based around the immediate eastern border of North Acton, including light-rail lines to nearby areas.

Park Royal has a large ASDA superstore.

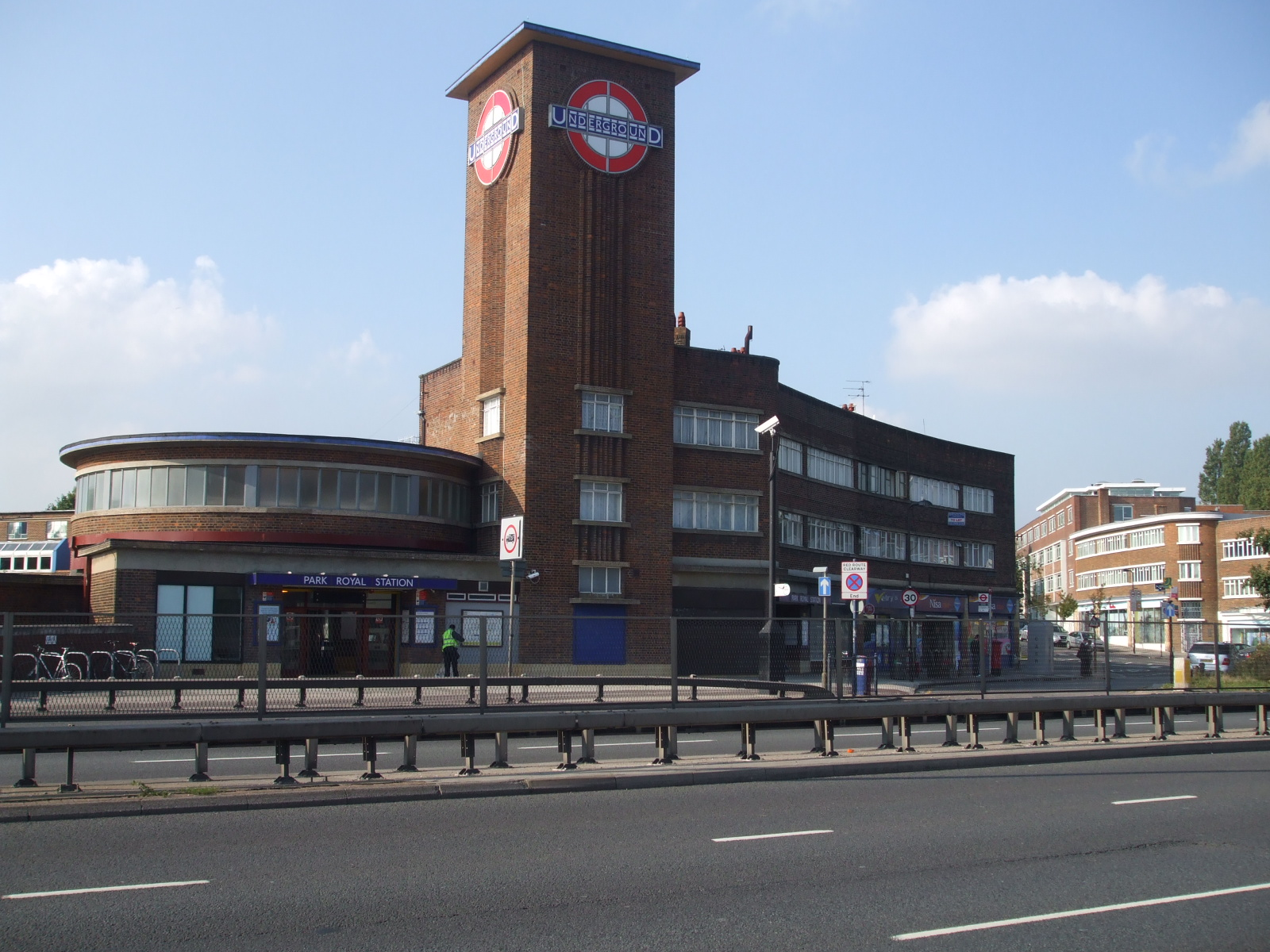
Park Royal tube station

=== Re-development ===
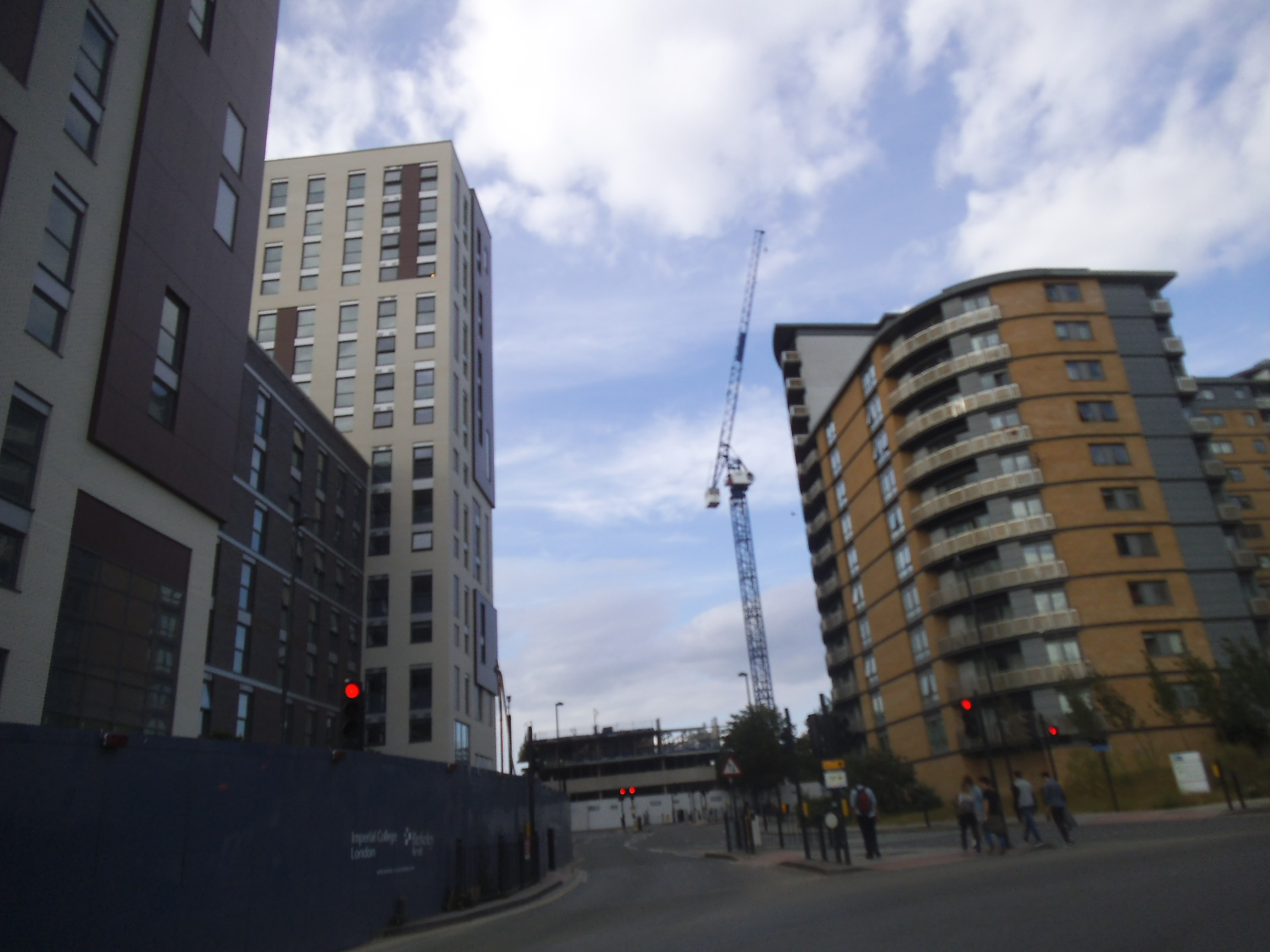
New built high rises in the Park Royal-North Acton area

The Old Oak and Park Royal redevelopment area is envisaged to provide 65,000 new jobs and 25,000 new homes.

=== Transport ===
==== Road ====
Park Royal is served by the A40 and A406 roads, and is situated close to a major interchange called the Hanger Lane gyratory.

==== Cycle Network ====
London Cycle Network routes 40, 42, 84 and 85 all serve Park Royal.

==== Underground and Overground ====
Stations in the area are:

- Hanger Lane tube station (Central line)
- Park Royal tube station (Piccadilly line)
- Stonebridge Park station (Bakerloo line & Watford DC Line)
- Harlesden station (Bakerloo line & Watford DC Line) - partly in the district.

==== Future transport developments ====
As well as HS2 and the Elizabeth line at adjacent Old Oak Common, three possible new transport services have been proposed for the area: the West London Orbital, Fastbus and the North and West London Light railway.
