= Brent Viaduct =

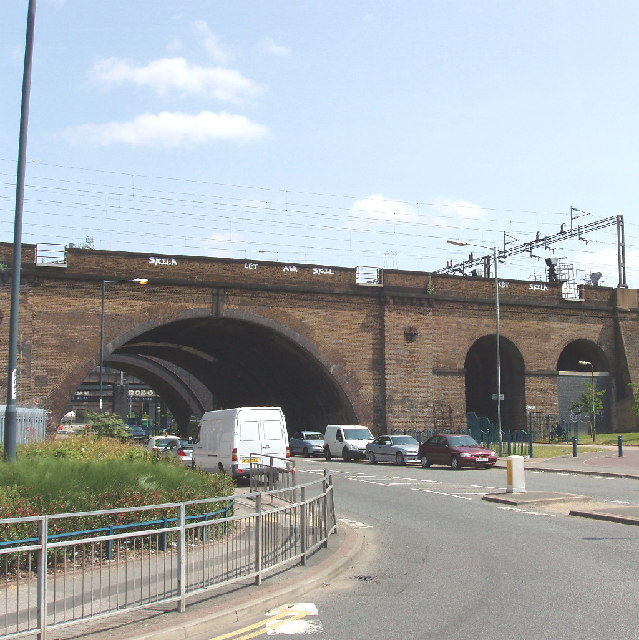
- The west side of the viaduct
- Coordinates: 51°32′31″N 0°16′37″W
- Carries: West Coast Main Line
- Crosses: River Brent (culverted)
- Locale: Stonebridge Park, London
- Maintained by: Network Rail
- Heritage status: Grade II listed building

Characteristics
- Material: Brick
- No. of spans: 7 (1 main)

History
- Opened: 1838

The Brent Viaduct is a railway bridge carrying the West Coast Main Line over the valley of the River Brent just south of Stonebridge Park station in north-west London, England. Originally built in 1838 for the London and Birmingham Railway, it is now a Grade II listed building.

== Design ==
The viaduct is one of the first major civil engineering works on the West Coast Main Line after leaving Euston station, its London terminus. The River Brent is in a wide, shallow valley though has since been culverted. The viaduct is entirely in brick. It has one main, semi-elliptical arch in the centre, supported by decorated buttresses. This arch crosses the road and is flanked by three narrower supporting arches on each side which span footpaths.

== History ==
The viaduct was built by Robert Stephenson, who was chief engineer of the London and Birmingham Railway (LBR), the world's first long-distance trunk railway. It is still in use today and now carries the West Coast Main Line. It crosses North Circular Road, though the route of the North Circular (the A406) now bypasses the road to the south and is spanned by a more modern bridge. The Brent Viaduct has been widened several times on its east side, though in a sympathetic style, to accommodate more tracks but the west side is largely unaltered.

The viaduct was described by John Cooke Bourne in his account of the building of the LBR. It has been a Grade II listed building since 1981. Listed status provides legal protection from unauthorised demolition or modification.
