= Stonebridge, London =

Area of Brent, London, England

Coordinates: 51.541184°N 0.263800°W

Stonebridge
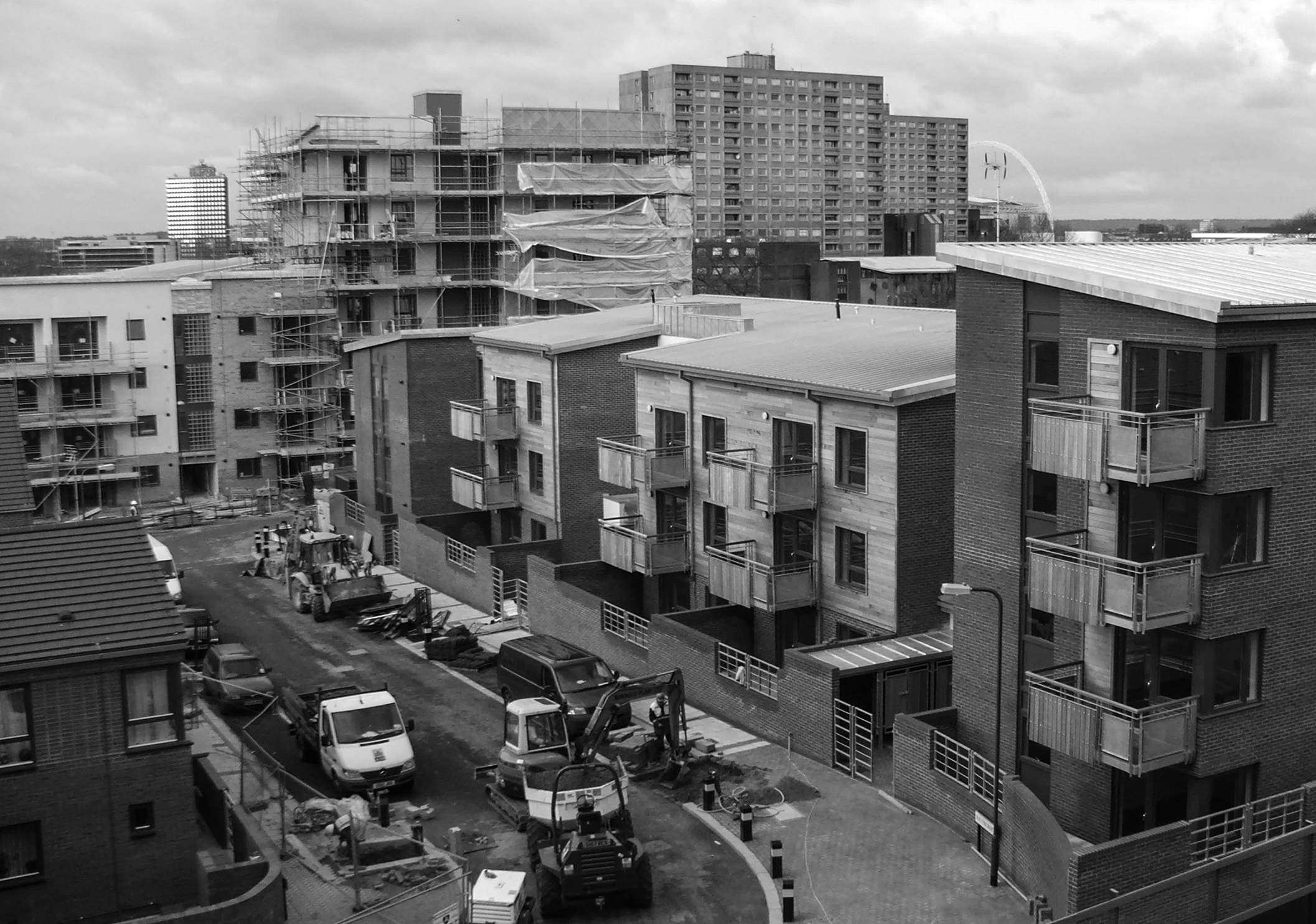
- Old and new developments of Stonebridge Estate, 2007

- Location within Greater London
- Population: 16,903 (2011 Census. Ward)
- OS grid reference: TQ203839
- London borough: Brent
- Ceremonial county: Greater London
- Region: London
- Country: England
- Sovereign state: United Kingdom
- Post town: LONDON
- Postcode district: NW10
- Dialling code: 020
- Police: Metropolitan
- Fire: London
- Ambulance: London
- UK Parliament: Brent East
- London Assembly: Brent and Harrow

Stonebridge is a locality in the London Borough of Brent. Stonebridge is situated in southern Brent and makes up the western part of Harlesden. The A404 runs through the district known locally as Brentfield and Hillside, while to the south are railway tracks and to the west is the North Circular Road along with Stonebridge Park station. The area is known for the previously troubled 1960s Stonebridge housing estate, which was completely redeveloped in the 2010s.

Stonebridge is also the name of the largest electoral ward in the borough, which includes Stonebridge itself as well as Park Royal and the southern half of Neasden including the St Raphael's Estate; it is the most populated ward in Brent with a population over 17,000 with the majority of Afro-Caribbean heritage.

== History ==
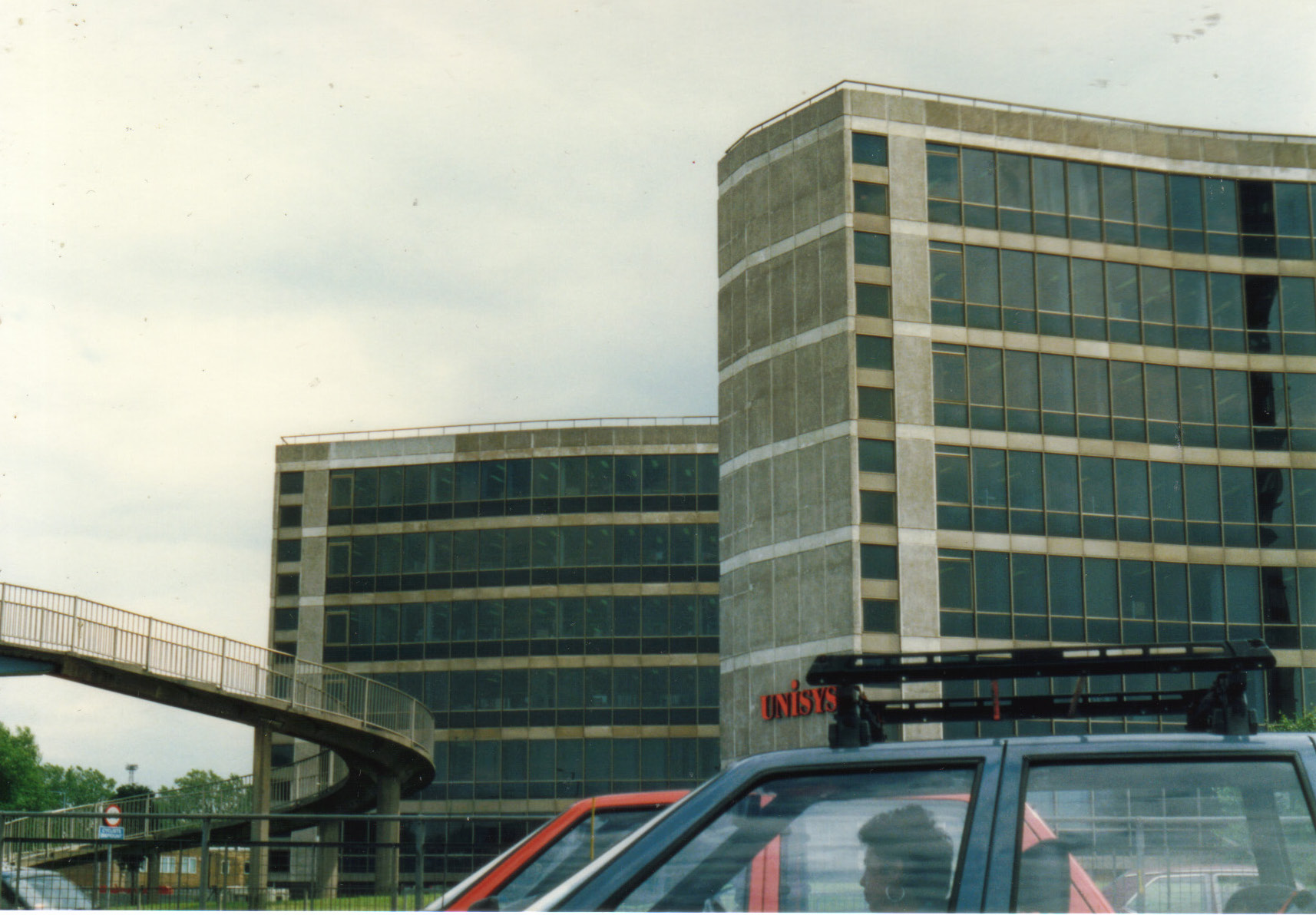
The former Unisys office building at the Stonebridge Park North Circular Road junction, abandoned since c. 1996

The area was named after a stone bridge built in the later 17th century (when most bridges were of wood) over the River Brent to the north.

The exclusive Craven Park Estate of large houses was built in the 1860s and later, roughly at the same time as the Midland Railway constructed the Dudding Hill Line (now a freight line), which gave its new residents access to central London. However, the passenger service on the line closed for a second and final time in 1902, but only after a sustained protest campaign by local people.

In January 1928, over 200 homes on the Brentfield Estate in Stonebridge Park were flooded. The River Brent broke its banks near the Harrow Road.

Although other high-quality housing had grown up around the now-closed nearby Harlesden (Midland) railway station, the area failed to consolidate as an up-market suburb, because of the general expansion of London, increasing industry, and the building of low-quality, cheap housing, in the late nineteenth century. Sub-division of many of the large houses was carried out and Stonebridge became a low-income area, which continued after high-rise comprehensive redevelopment, mostly built in a single architectural style and called the 'Stonebridge Estate', in the 1960s and 1970s.

Some parts of Stonebridge have always been in private ownership, and not been part of the Stonebridge Estate.

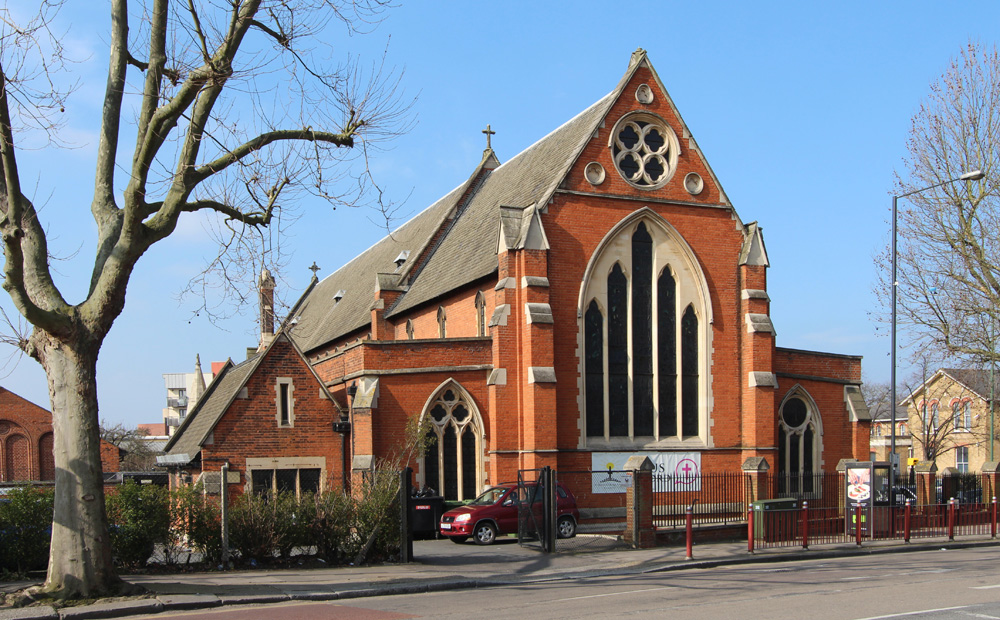
Church of St Michael & All Angels on Hillside, Stonebridge

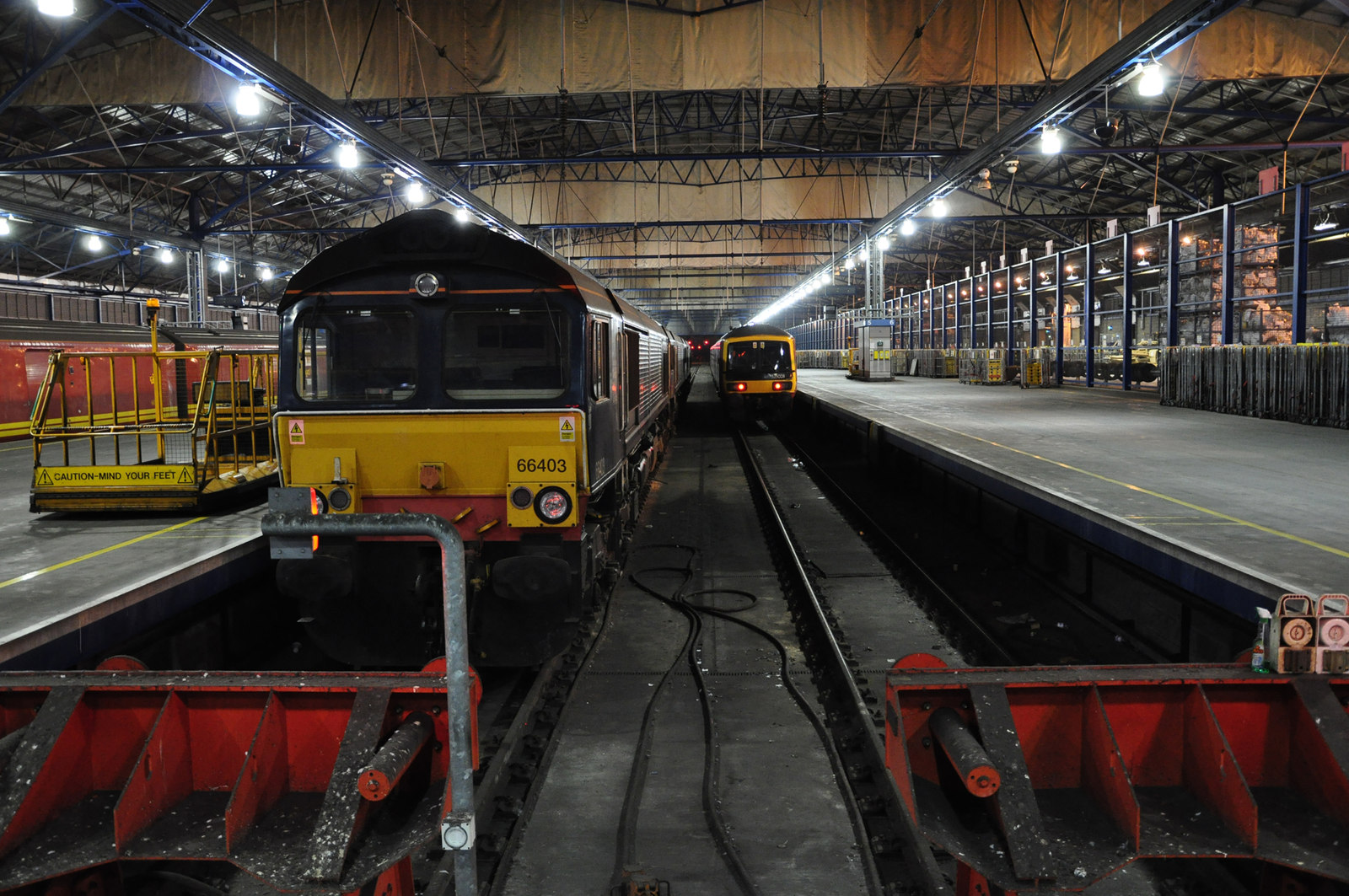
Inside Royal Mail's Princess Royal Distribution Centre, mainly used as a road mail hub but with some going by rail

Although Stonebridge is geographically adjacent to the Park Royal industrial estate, it is almost entirely cut off from it because of the Bakerloo/Watford DC/West Coast Main Line railway tracks and a large Royal Mail distribution centre.

== Built environment ==
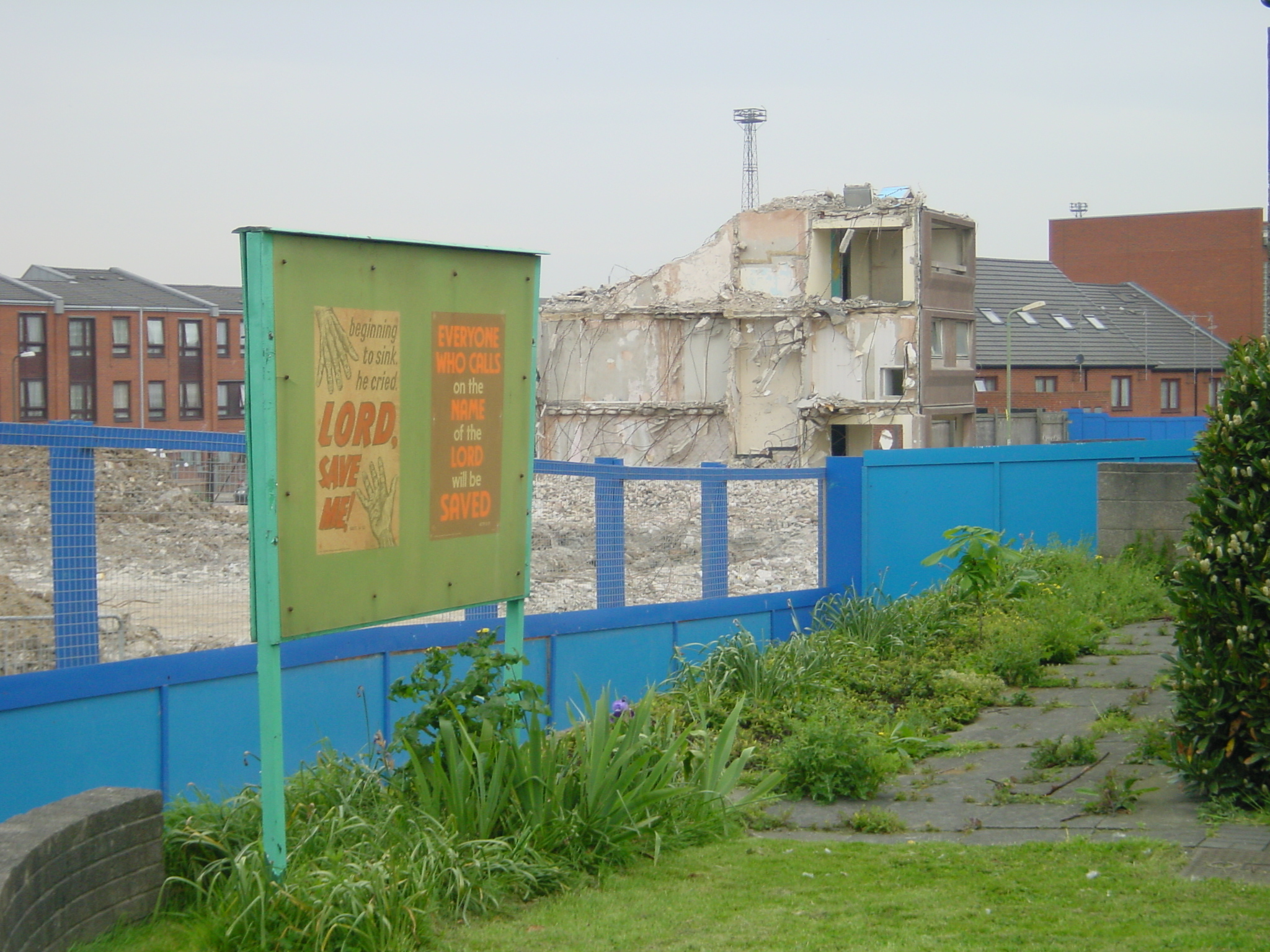
Demolition of an old 8-storey building in 2007 (replacement housing is visible behind)

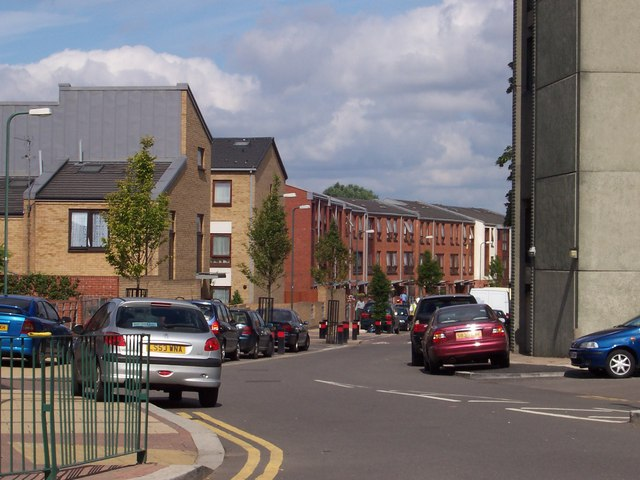
Lawrence Avenue in the present-day Stonebridge estate

During the 1950s the council planned a massive redevelopment covering almost 100 acres of Stonebridge. More than 2,000 units were built, mostly in high-rise blocks, the first of which opened in 1967.

Some improvements in the street scene happened in the early 1990s, as a result of the 'Harlesden City Challenge' award of government money to the area, which was by now regarded as one of the most troubled parts of London. In April 1994, The Independent newspaper highlighted an unemployment rate of around 25% (compared to a national average of around 10% at the time), as well as widespread drug abuse, burglaries and violence.

Most improvements, however, came after 2000, when comprehensive redevelopment of the 1960s and 1970s housing started. This is mainly complete by 2010, although some empty high-rise buildings were still being demolished.

A traditional street layout has been introduced, largely of two- and three-storey houses, often with four-storey flats around street junctions.

The Stonebridge Estate has been redeveloped by Stonebridge Housing Action Trust, set up in 1994 under the Housing Act 1988, and with the aim to "transform the 1,775 home Stonebridge Estate by providing innovative solutions to the problems of social and economic deprivation faced by local residents".

It responded with various training and leisure initiatives, and modern, low-rise houses with some four-storey blocks of flats, mainly on street corners to give variety to the street scene.

In 2008, the redevelopment was awarded the European Urban and Regional Planning Award, under the category Public Participation in Planning, for its "exemplary approach to public participation".

The Housing Action Trust was dissolved in 2007, and housing is now a mixture of housing association ownership (Hillside Housing Trust, part of the Hyde Group) and reversion to the London Borough of Brent. Tenants were given a choice about which ownership they preferred.

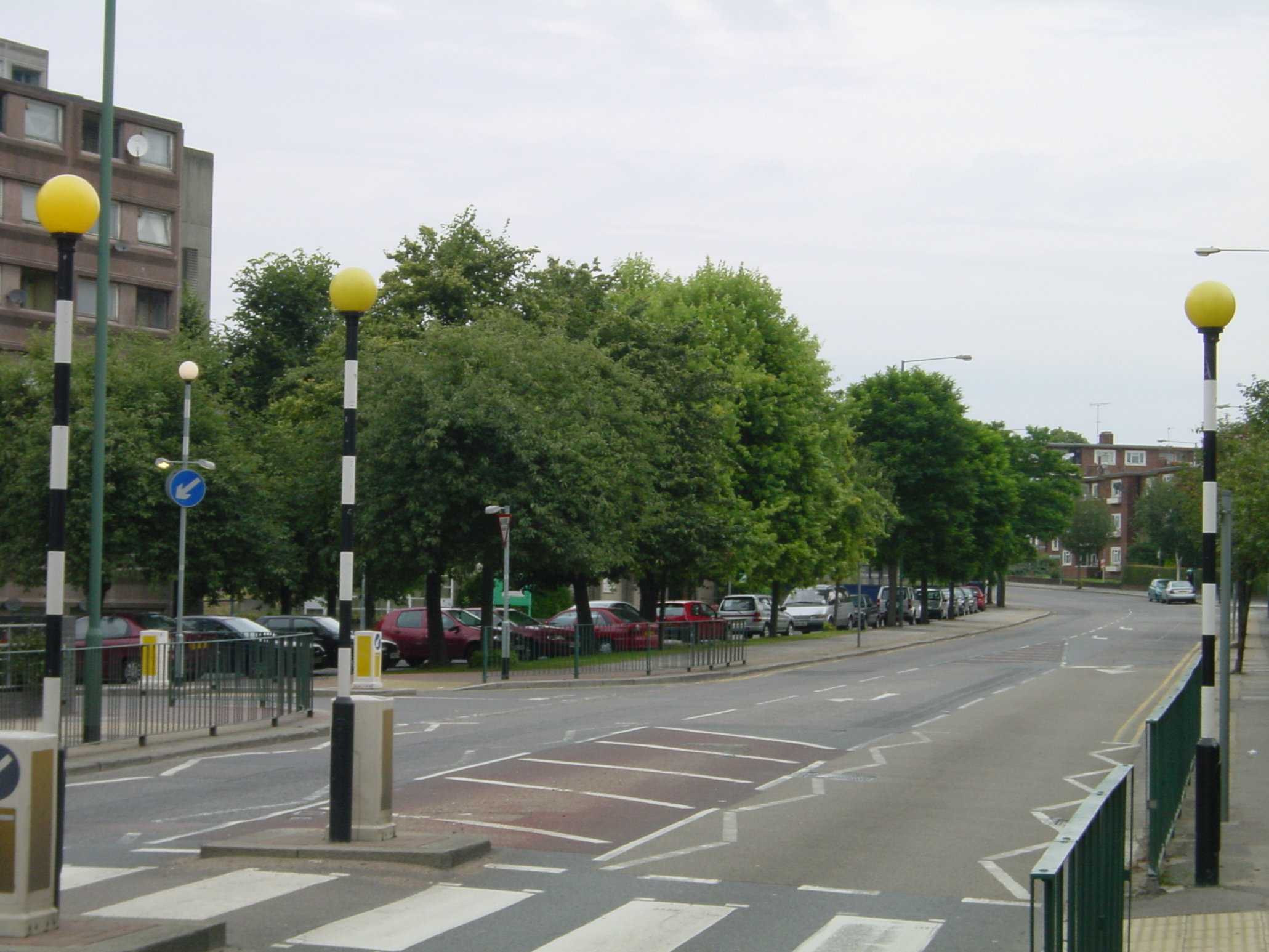
Winchelsea Road, Stonebridge. The trees on the left have been protected by a Tree Preservation Order

New development on Hillside, part of the A404 Harrow Road through the area, includes private ownership of flats above offices, and a health centre. Redevelopment has gone hand-in-hand with training and sports initiatives for local people.

A tree preservation order has been adopted by Brent Council on Winchelsea Road nearby, to protect the street scene, forcing new buildings to be set back from the road. The "exemplary approach to public participation" award quoted above may well have been justified regarding estate residents, but there were local media claims in 2007 that it was not true regarding neighbours, as evidenced by Brent Council's willingness to protect the Winchelsea Road trees.

== Crime ==
Stonebridge suffers from high rates of violent crime. In 2015 it had the highest recorded gun crime of any ward in London, with 16 individual reports of gunshots.

Police figures for 2016–2017 included 768 incidents of violence and sexual offences and 868 incidents of antisocial behaviour; in this period police abandoned more than 41 percent of cases because no culprit was identified.

Neighbouring Harlesden witnessed a huge increase in shootings from around 1999, becoming the highest murder rated district nationwide by 2001. This contributed to Stonebridge's reputation as one of the most dangerous places in the UK, as most perpetrators were associated or lived in the Stonebridge estate.

In 2003, 21-year-old college student Kavian Francis-Hopwood was shot dead on the Stonebridge Park estate. In August 2005 two sisters and their mother's partner were murdered in a contract killing in Clark Court, Stonebridge. In 2009 a young father was murdered outside a party at a Stonebridge primary school. And in 2010 former Millwall footballer Gavin Grant was one of three men found guilty of shooting dead Leon Labastide on a street in Stonebridge: Stephen Batten QC, prosecuting, said the case reflected a "law of the jungle" culture of shootings and drug dealing on the estate.

As regeneration continues, negative press coverage is inching toward the positive. However, crime figures remain high. Police officers say gun crime in particular remains a serious problem.

Rapper from the USG Crew, Smalls, was murdered outside a chicken shop near Stonebridge Park station on 5 July 2019.

On 4 June 2020, a suspected member of USG travelled to Harlesden, Church Road and performed a quadruple shooting, in retaliation for a previous incident. This was yet another case of the ongoing tit-for-tat shootings between gangs in the Harlesden and Stonebridge area. A toddler was shot in the head in the incident, but miraculously survived.

On 16 July 2020 a member of Harrow Road Boyz gang, Billy McCullagh (also known as Billy The Kid), was shot dead on Windrush Road in the Stonebridge Estate as the norm of tit-for-tat shootings continues.

== Politics and government ==
Stonebridge is part of the Brent East constituency for elections to the House of Commons of the United Kingdom, currently represented by Dawn Butler from the Labour Party.

Stonebridge is part of the Stonebridge ward for elections to Brent London Borough Council.

== Demography ==
Stonebridge has a large black population, the highest in the London Borough of Brent. The 2011 census showed that 47.2% of the population was black, up from 45.8% in 2001. Whites formed 23.5% of the population in the 2011 census, down from 33% in 2001. Christians and Muslims form 49.9% and 28.2% of the population respectively.

The majority of the population of Stonebridge are social renters, at 63.3%.

== Transport ==
London Buses serving Stonebridge are:

=== Buses ===
Route	Start	End	Operator
18	Euston Station	Sudbury	London United
79	Edgware	Stonebridge Park station	London Sovereign
112	Ealing Broadway	North Finchley Bus Station	Metroline
206	Wembley Park	Kilburn Park	Metroline
224	St Raphael's Estate	Wembley Stadium	London United
440	Wembley Park, Fourth Way	Turnham Green Church	London United
N18	Trafalgar Square	Harrow Weald	London United

=== Trains ===
Train Line	Station	Service
Bakerloo Line	Stonebridge Park	London Underground
Overground (Watford Junction - Euston)	Stonebridge Park	London Overground

== Notable residents ==
- K Koke - rapper
- Raheem Sterling - footballer
- Chunkz - Youtuber

== See also ==
- Brent Park
- Harlesden station
- Park Royal
- Stonebridge Park station
- St Raphael's Estate
- Chalkhill Estate
- South Kilburn
