= Stonebridge Park Depot =

London Underground depot

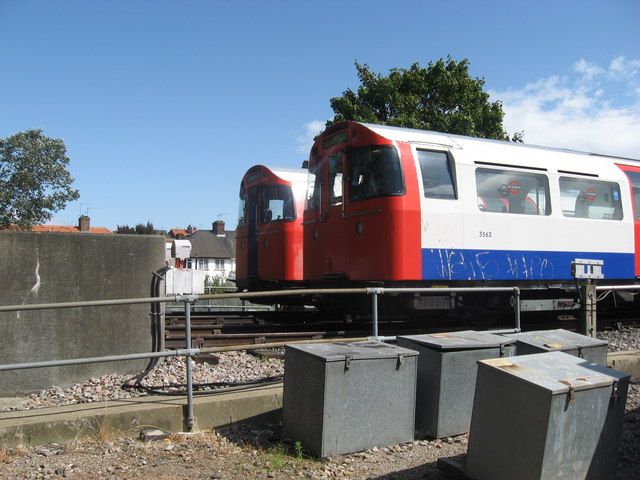
- Two trains of 1972 Stock stabled at the depot
- Interactive map of Stonebridge Park Depot

Location
- Location: Brent, United Kingdom
- Coordinates: 51.548°N 0.287°W
- OS grid: TQ188845

Characteristics
- Owner: London Underground
- Type: Tube stock

History
- Opened: 1979

Stonebridge Park Depot is a stabling and maintenance depot for trains on the Bakerloo line of the London Underground in England. It opened in 1979, as part of the restructuring that resulted in the Bakerloo line's Stanmore branch becoming part of the Jubilee line. It is the main depot on the Bakerloo line, and has been used for stabling stock dating from 1938, 1959 and 1972. In addition, trains of 1972 Stock from the Northern line have been transferred to the depot temporarily for overhaul.

== History ==
The Bakerloo line opened from Baker Street to Lambeth North in 1906, and trains were stabled and maintained at London Road Depot. This had been built on the site of a school for the Indigent Blind, and was accessed by a 0.37 miles (0.60 km) branch, leaving the running tunnels between Waterloo and Lambeth North stations. The line was extended to Elephant and Castle at the southern end, while at the northern end, it reached Queen's Park on 11 February 1915. A branch from Baker Street to Finchley Road was opened on 20 November 1939, and services were extended along the Metropolitan line tracks to terminate at Stanmore. Neasden Depot became the centre for maintenance of the trains, and London Road was downgraded to becoming stabling sidings.

When plans were made to split the two northern branches of the Bakerloo, with the Stanmore branch becoming part of the Jubilee line, it became necessary to provide new stabling and maintenance facilities for the truncated Bakerloo line, and a new depot was built at Stonebridge Park, which opened in 1979. This is located just to the north-west of Stonebridge Park station, and has two main sheds. Tracks 31 to 38 are furthest west, and are equipped with pits between the rails. The second building covers tracks 39 to 44, and is further east. There are three open air sidings, numbered 45 to 47, two of which were added around 1989. In 2002, 12 trains were normally stabled at the depot.

=== Operation ===
Unusually, the trains are turned to run on the Bakerloo, with the 'A' end facing south and the 'D' end facing north. This allows shunting within the depot to be carried out from a middle driving motor car of a four-car unit, rather than from the shunting cabinet on an uncoupling non-driving motor car of a three-car unit.
