= Stonebridge Park station =

London Underground and London Overground station

Stonebridge Park
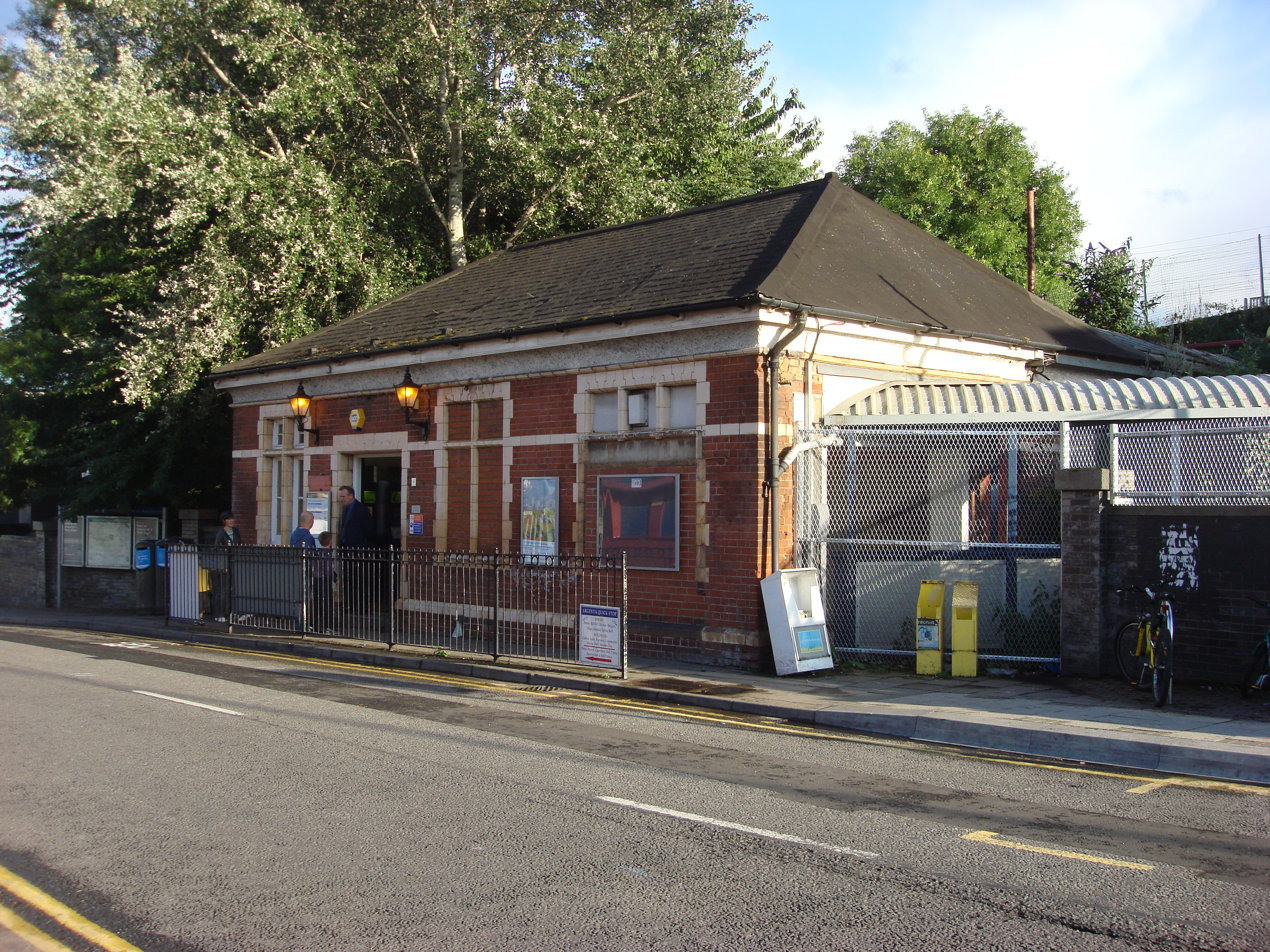
- Station building
- Interactive map of Stonebridge Park

General information
- Location: Tokyngton/Stonebridge
- Local authority: London Borough of Brent
- Managed by: London Underground
- Owner: Network Rail
- Station code: SBP
- DfT category: D
- Number of platforms: 2
- Fare zone: 3

London Underground annual entry and exit
- 2020: ▼1.98 million
- 2021: ▼1.24 million
- 2022: ▲2.20 million
- 2023: ▲2.39 million
- 2024: ▲2.49 million

National Rail annual entry and exit
- 2020–21: ▼0.579 million
- 2021–22: ▲1.004 million
- 2022–23: ▲1.188 million
- 2023–24: ▲1.300 million
- 2024–25: ▲1.355 million

Key dates
- 15 June 1912: Opened

Other information
- External links: TfL station info page; Departures; Facilities
- Coordinates: 51.5441°N 0.2754°W

Stonebridge Park is an interchange station in Tokyngton and Stonebridge, north-west London. It is on the Bakerloo line of the London Underground and the Lioness line of the London Overground, between Wembley Central and Harlesden stations. The station is located on Argenta Way, and is named after the nearby junction connecting the North Circular Road (A406) with the Harrow Road (A404).

== History ==
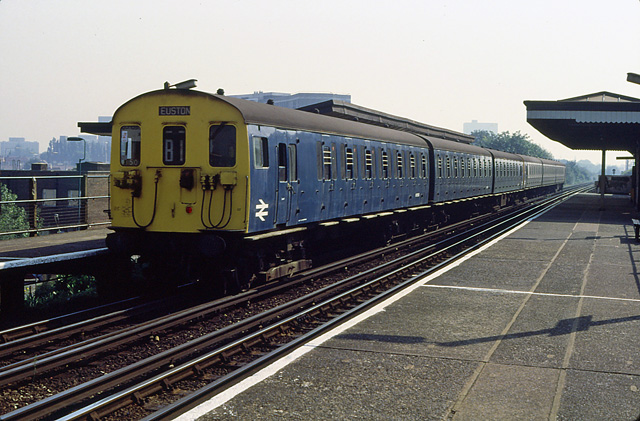
Class 501 arriving at Stonebridge Park in 1985

The line serving the station was opened by the London and North Western Railway as part of their New Line project on 15 June 1912. It closed on 9 January 1917 and reopened for Bakerloo line trains on 1 August 1917. One of the generating stations supplying this network was on the site of the current London Underground depot north west of the station. The carriage shed, now without direct connection to the DC line, between Stonebridge Park station and Stonebridge Park LU depot was originally built to house LNWR stock using the DC line.

The current station platforms and associated buildings were first built by the London, Midland and Scottish Railway in 1948 to a design attributed to John Weeks following destruction of the original structures by bombing in World War II, the booking hall at ground level appears to be the original building. The platform-level style of the rebuilding was different from that of the original DC line stations (but not the same as the 1938 South Kenton station on the same line), utilising concrete and steel rather than brick buildings with wood and glass canopies. The 1948 buildings have themselves suffered two major fires which resulted in the rebuilding of the up side platform buildings and later the partial demolition of the down side platform building. Later upgrading and improvement of the platform structures has retained the basic 1940s shape.

From 24 September 1982 to 4 June 1984 it was the northern operational terminus of the Bakerloo line. London Underground's Stonebridge Park Depot is 500 m (550 yd) to the north-west of the station. The Brent Viaduct, a Grade II listed building built by the London and Birmingham Railway in the 1830s, is immediately south of the station.

== Connections ==
London Buses routes 18, 79, 112, 440 and night routes N18 and N118 serve the station front.

== Local attractions ==
- Ace Cafe London

Preceding station	London Overground	Following station
Wembley Central towards Watford Junction	Lioness line Watford DC line	Harlesden towards Euston
Preceding station	London Underground	Following station
Wembley Central towards Harrow & Wealdstone	Bakerloo line	Harlesden towards Elephant & Castle
