= De Beauvoir Town =

Area of Hackney, East London

Coordinates: 51.5437°N 0.0805°W

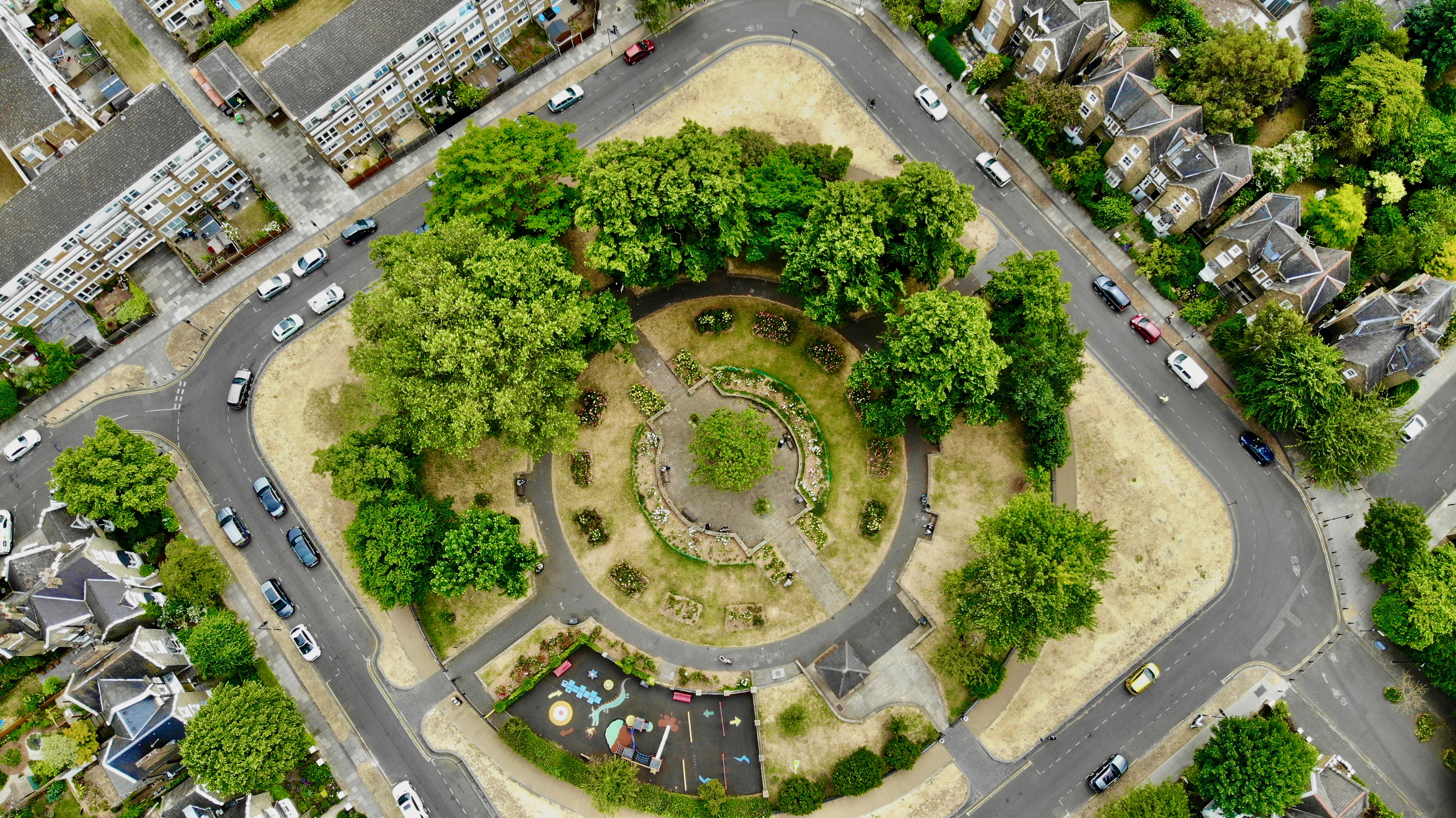
- Aerial view of De Beauvoir Square

- Location within Greater London
- OS grid reference: TQ3384
  - Charing Cross: 3.8 mi (6.1 km) SW
- London borough: Hackney
- Ceremonial county: Greater London
- Region: London
- Country: England
- Sovereign state: United Kingdom
- Post town: LONDON
- Police: Metropolitan
- Fire: London
- Ambulance: London
- UK Parliament: Hackney South and Shoreditch
- London Assembly: North East

De Beauvoir Town is a neighbourhood of Hackney, in the London Borough of Hackney, 2 miles (3.2 km) north of the City of London. It is sometimes described as a part of Dalston. The name is pronounced variously; notably /də ˈbiːvər/ (də BEE-vər) and /di ˈboʊvwɑːr/ (dee BOH-vwar), with the former giving rise to its traditional Cockney nickname Beavertown.

The area, then in the ancient parish of Hackney, was developed in the mid-19th century. Most of its development was carried out as part of a plan for new town to attract prosperous residents, though it includes a range of housing types and other land uses. The new town was based around De Beauvoir Square and primarily built in the Jacobethan style.

The special character of the neighbourhood has been retained and is recognised by the designation of the De Beauvoir and Kingsland Road Conservation Areas which include many listed and other notable buildings.

== Boundaries ==
Its boundaries are defined by its highly geometric streets and an early 19th century canal. They are: Kingsland Road to the east, Regents Canal to the south, Southgate Road to the west and Balls Pond Road to the north; the middle of the last two roads marks the border of the London Boroughs of Hackney and Islington. The area enclosed by these roads is just over 0.7 square kilometres (0.27 sq mi). Direct neighbours are Canonbury, Dalston, Hoxton and Haggerston areas.

== History ==
=== 19th century ===
Until 1820 the area now covered by De Beauvoir Town was open country with a few grand houses. In 1821, stimulated by the opening of the Regent's Canal the previous year, developer and brickmaker William Rhodes (1774–1843), a grandfather of Cecil Rhodes, secured a lease for 150 acres (0.61 km^{2}) of land from Peter de Beauvoir. Rhodes planned to build residences for the upper classes set on wide streets in a grid pattern, with four squares on diagonal streets intersecting at an octagon. However, work stopped in 1823 when Rhodes was found to have obtained his lease unfairly and after a court case spanning over 20 years the land reverted to the de Beauvoir family in 1834.

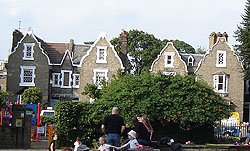
The distinctive Jacobethan styled gables and mullioned windows of houses in De Beauvoir Square

The delay in the building had meant that Rhodes' clientele had since moved on to the new suburbs of the West End. The scheme was scaled down and of the planned squares only the southeastern was built, as De Beauvoir Square, although the diagonals partly survived in Enfield Road, Stamford Road and Ardleigh Road. Occupied in the 1840s by the newly emerging middle classes, the estate was almost wholly residential except around Kingsland Basin and the south-west corner where a factory was leased from 1823.

=== 20th century ===
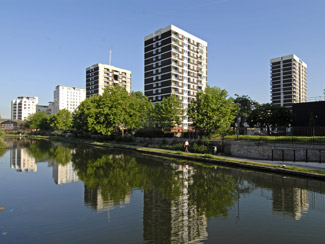
De Beauvoir Estate, completed in 1971

In 1907, the Fifth Congress of the Russian Social Democratic Labour Party was held at the Brotherhood Church on the east side of Southgate Road. Attendees included Lenin, Stalin, Maxim Gorky, Rosa Luxemburg and Leon Trotsky. The congress debated strategy for a communist revolution in Russia and strengthened the position of Lenin's Bolsheviks.

In 1937, due to its easy access to Kingsland Basin, the southeast corner between Downham Road and Hertford Road was re-zoned for industrial use. Soon afterwards, the areas south of Downham Road were included. These were distinguished from the north side, which was already zoned for business and acted as a buffer for the mainly residential streets beyond. In 1938 De Beauvoir Crescent was suggested as another business zone to protect housing to the north.

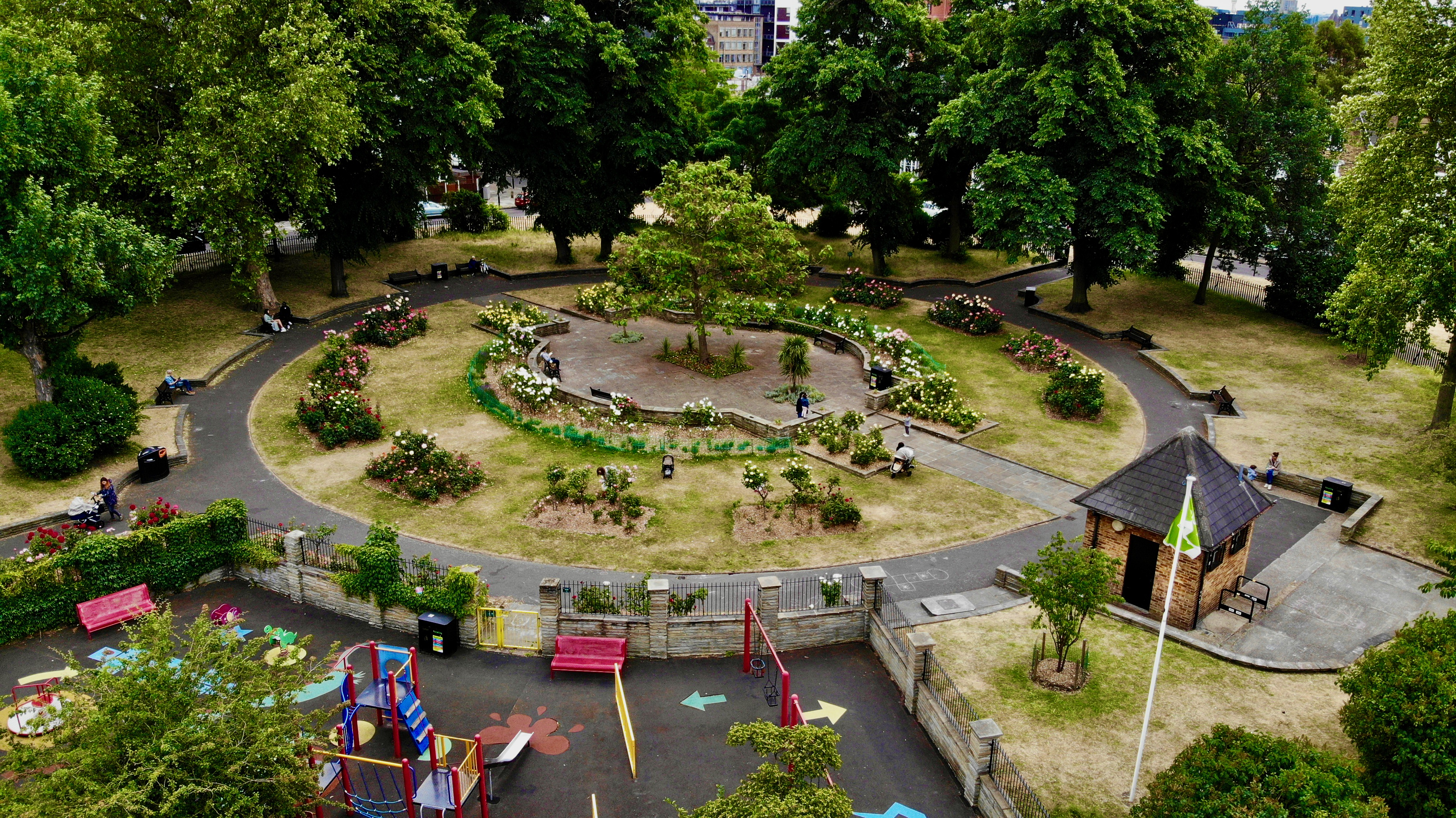
De Beauvoir Square in the summer

In the early 1960s the northern part of De Beauvoir Town between Buckingham Road and Tottenham Road was rebuilt as the Metropolitan Borough of Hackney's Kingsgate estate. In the late 1960s a larger area west of the canal basin, which contained many small factories, made way for the De Beauvoir Estate. The east side of De Beauvoir Square was also rebuilt as the Lockner Road estate.

In 1968 the De Beauvoir Association was formed to fight Hackney Council's plans to demolish the area and build new council estates on it. The rest of the square with the area bounded by Englefield Road, Northchurch Road, Southgate Road, Hertford Road, and Stamford Road became a conservation area in 1969. This area was later extended to cover most of De Beauvoir Town; the eastern edge, however, is in the Kingsland conservation area.

In the 1970s the Greater London Council installed experimental design measures in De Beauvoir Town to reduce through vehicle traffic and make streets safer for children's play. These were designed by the architect Graham Parsey who lived in the area and was chairman of the De Beauvoir Association. This included filtered permeability measures on roads including Downham Road and Northchurch Road.

== In the arts ==
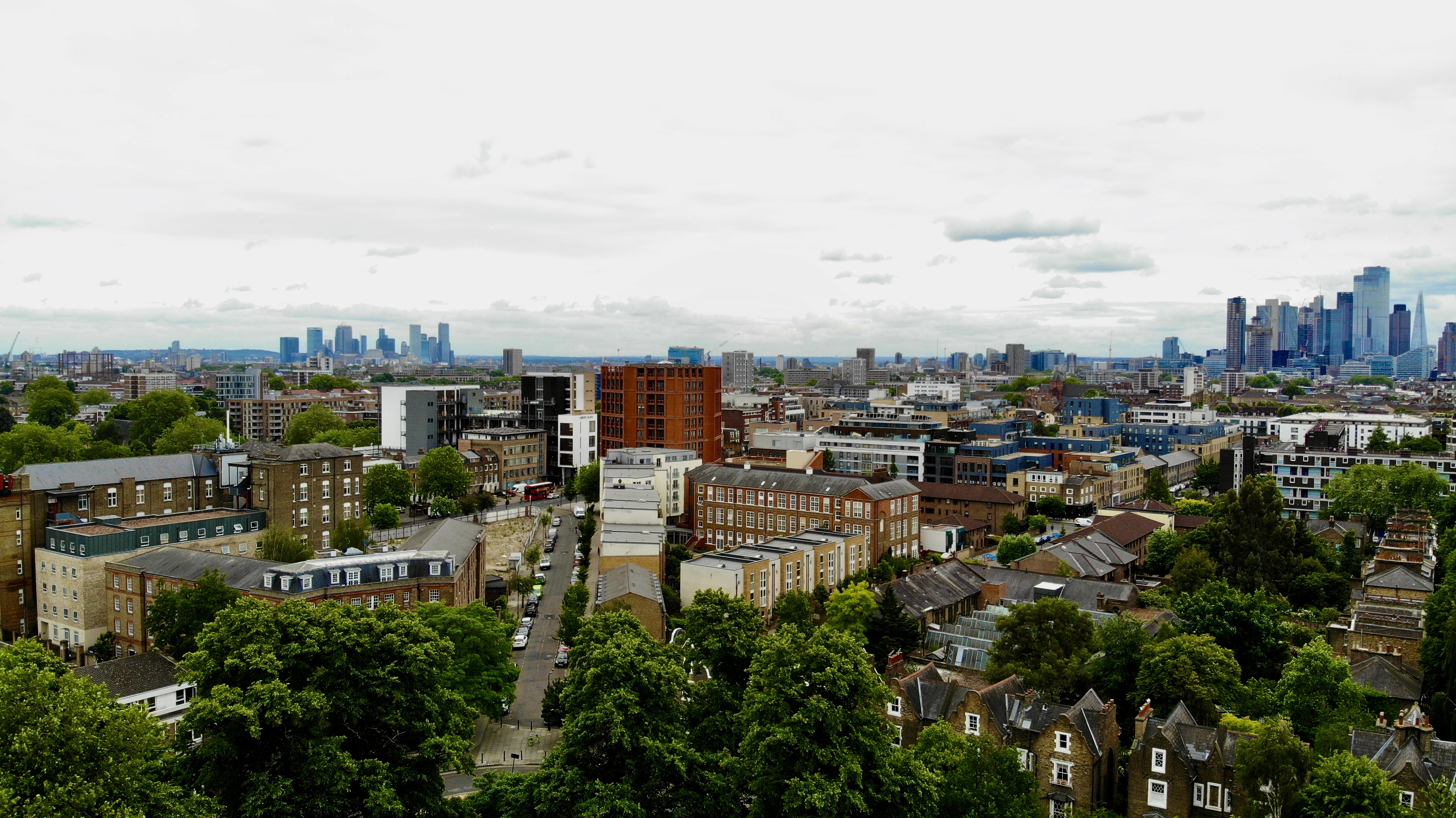
Aerial view of London city and Canary Wharf from De Beauvoir Square

The music video to accompany the release of "Stay With Me" by Sam Smith shows Smith coming out of a house and walking down a street in De Beauvoir Town. It was directed by Jamie Thraves. Parts of the feature films 28 Weeks Later and The Gentlemen were filmed in De Beauvoir Town. The cover of Tinie Tempah's album Youth shows a scene on the De Beauvoir Estate.

== Notable residents ==
Edmund Gosse, the poet, the son of naturalist Philip Henry Gosse, lived in the area. Tony Calvert, co-founder of Terrence Higgins Trust, lives in the area.

Graham Parsey (1938–2011), architect, journalist, local campaigner and Chairman of the De Beauvoir Association, who from the late 1960s with the formation of the DBA (De Beauvoir Association) worked to make the area a GIA (General Improvement Area) and therefore saved the whole area from demolition by Hackney Council. He stood at three Public Inquiries as an expert witness and led and organised a successful community campaign to oppose the demolition of six hundred houses. The status of De Beauvoir as a conservation area, the fact that the area still stands in its present form is because of his work. He self-published the De Beaver newspaper which was the hub of local activity. He also designed and implemented all the cycle pathways and traffic calming measures in the 1970s, which is such a feature of the area today. His papers are in the collection of the Bishopsgate Archive.

In 1978 the landscape gardener Jude Moraes founded the De Beauvoir Gardeners' Club which held annual flower and produce shows in the vicarage garden. For the Club she organised expert lectures and visits to foreign gardens in France, Holland and Ireland. The Club brought together the area's established working class residents and the new middle class arrivals, a model which Jude, with her strong social conscience, was anxious to repeat in other poor London districts, though most of the schemes foundered due to bureaucracy, political correctness and a lack of funding.

De Beauvoir Town was home to William Lyttle (1931–2010), a retired electrical engineer known as the Mole Man of Hackney, who dug a series of tunnels under his 20-room property on the corner of Mortimer Road and Stamford Road. In 2001, his tunnelling caused an 8 ft (2.4 m) hole to appear in the pavement on Stamford Road. Reports that the tunnelling had started again in 2006 were confirmed when Hackney Council found a network of tunnels and caverns, some 8 m (26 ft) deep, spreading up to 20m in every direction from his house. In August 2006, the council obtained a court order banning Lyttle from his property. He died in 2010 and the fate of the house, by now derelict and needing a new roof, was thought to be uncertain. On 19 July 2012 the house was sold at auction for £1.12 million. By 2020, the house had been renovated by the architect David Adjaye to form a home and studio for the artist Sue Webster.

The first Alternative Miss World was held on 25 March 1972 in the studio of Andrew Logan in Downham Road, which was a converted jigsaw factory. The studio was attended by David Hockney, Derek Jarman amongst others.

The Gaspard the Fox series of children's books, by local author Zeb Soanes are set in and around De Beauvoir. James Mayhew's illustrations feature numerous local landmarks including De Beauvoir Square and the Regent's Canal.

== Elected representatives ==
The local MP is Meg Hillier. Two councillors serve the De Beauvoir ward, which, as of 2021, are James Peters and Polly Billington.

== Transport and locale ==
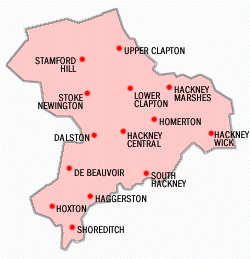
Districts within the London Borough of Hackney

Nearest railway stations

- Essex Road, services operated by Great Northern to Welwyn Garden City
- Canonbury, services operated by London Overground
- Dalston Junction, services operated by London Overground
- Haggerston, services operated by London Overground

Nearest London Underground stations

- Angel, served by Northern line
- Old Street, served by Northern line and Great Northern trains
- Highbury & Islington, served by Victoria line and Great Northern trains

Nearby bus routes

The area is well served by London Buses.

- 21 (Newington Green - Lewisham)
- 30 (Marble Arch - Hackney Wick)
- 38/N38 (Victoria - Clapton)
- 43 (Friern Barnet - London Bridge Station)
- 56 (Smithfield - Whipps Cross)
- 67 (Aldgate - Wood Green)
- 73/N73 (Victoria - Stoke Newington)
- 76/N76 (Waterloo - Seven Sisters)
- 141 (London Bridge - Palmers Green)
- 149 (London Bridge - Edmonton Green)
- 242 (Tottenham Court Road - Homerton Hospital)
- 243/N243 (Waterloo - Wood Green)
- 271 (Highgate Village - Moorgate)
- 277 (Highbury & Islington - Leamouth)
- 341 (Waterloo - Northumberland Park)
- 476 (Euston - Northumberland Park)

=== Walking and cycling ===
The Regent's Canal towpath is easily accessible to pedestrians and cyclists. Travelling east, provides access to Victoria Park, and to the west, Islington.
