= Canonbury =

Residential area of Islington, North London

Coordinates: 51.5439°N 0.0950°W

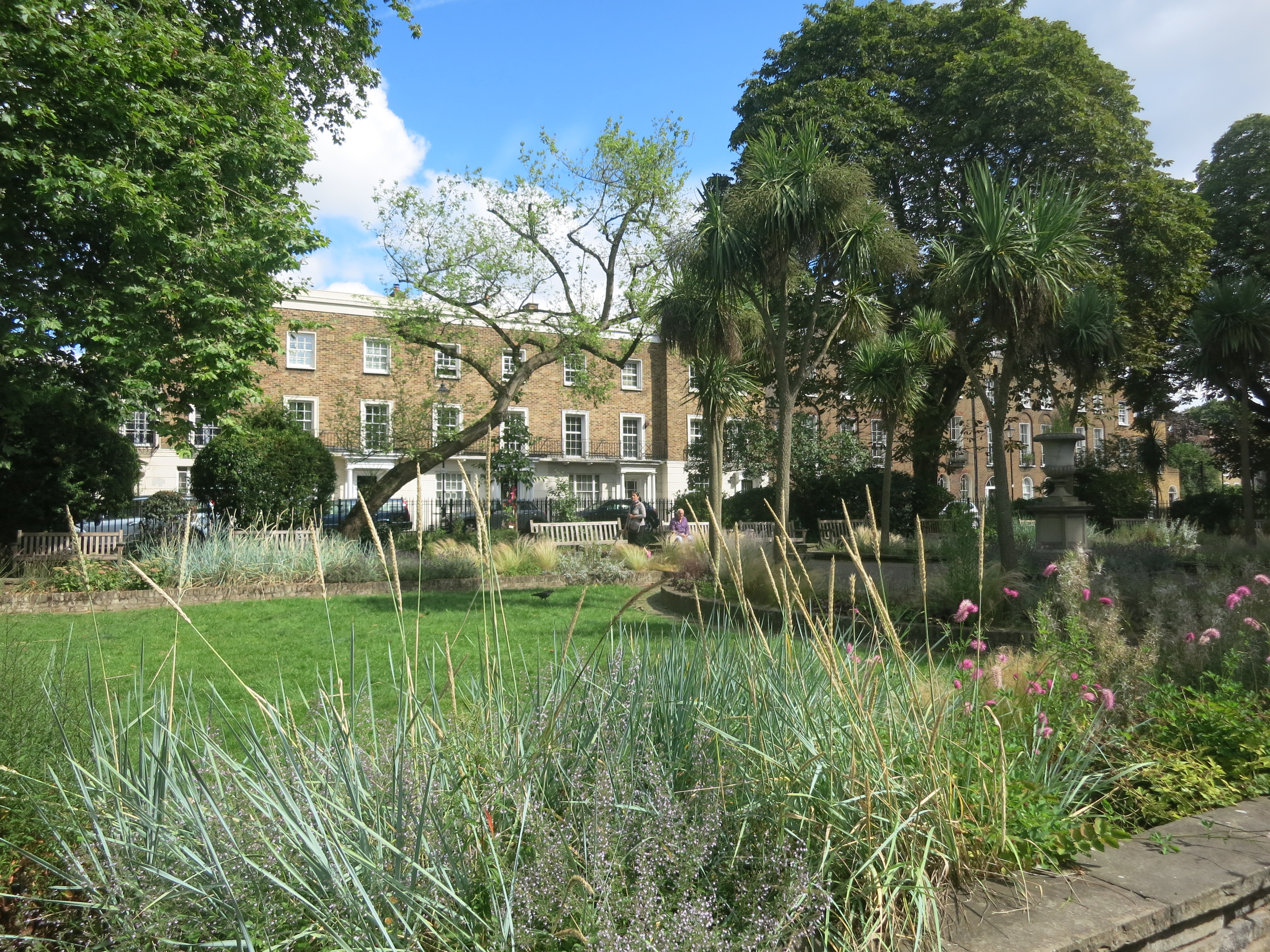
- Canonbury Square Gardens

- Location within Greater London
- Population: 12,666 (2021 Census. Ward)
- OS grid reference: TQ322845
- London borough: Islington
- Ceremonial county: Greater London
- Region: London
- Country: England
- Sovereign state: United Kingdom
- Post town: LONDON
- Postcode district: N1
- Dialling code: 020
- Police: Metropolitan
- Fire: London
- Ambulance: London
- UK Parliament: Islington South and Finsbury
- London Assembly: North East

Canonbury is an area in London, forming part of the London Borough of Islington. It is located within the area between Essex Road, Upper Street and Cross Street and either side of St Paul's Road in North London.

== History ==
It has been conjectured that a secondary Roman road ran through Canonbury en route from Cripplegate in the City of London to modern-day Stevenage. The suggested route approximately bisected Canonbury at an orientation just east of north, entering the area at around Canonbury Gardens, passing through the junction between Willow Bridge Road and Canonbury Place, and leaving Canonbury at the northernmost point of St Paul's Road, where it takes a slight bend to the east of Highbury Grove.

Before the Norman Conquest the land now contained in the triangle formed by Upper Street, Essex Road and St Paul's Road was an Anglo-Saxon manor. Passing to Norman ownership, it finally became part of the vast estates of the de Berners family. On 15 June 1253 Ralph de Berners made a grant of "lands, rents and their appurtenances in Iseldone" to the Prior and Canons of St Bartholomew's – an Augustinian order – in Smithfield. The area thus became known as the Canons' Burgh. The manor lay alongside the village of Islington, between Upper Street and Essex Road (formerly called Lower Street), with a northern boundary at St Paul's Road (formerly called Hopping Lane), and from the early 17th century the southern verge was the New River. The medieval manor house may have dated to 1362. (Note: The date of the medieval manor house is disputed.) By 1532 the canons had built an extensive house and grounds. There are records from 1433 and 1544 of Canonbury serving as the source of drinking water piped by conduits to the priory.

The area continued predominantly as open land until it was developed as a suburb in the early 19th century. Lord Northampton started developing land in Canonbury in 1803, with many of the streets named after the Spencer Compton family and Northampton estates.

In common with similar inner London areas, it suffered decline after the construction of railways in the 1860s enabled commuting into the city from further afield. The gentrification of the area from the 1950s included new developments to replace war-damaged properties in Canonbury Park North and South; replacement of larger, run-down houses with smaller houses and flats in John Spencer Square, Prior Bolton Street and St Mary's Grove; and restoration of older buildings.

== Geography ==
Canonbury sits on relatively high ground at the junction of the Thames and Lea river basins At a height of around 30m above sea level, the district is at about the same height as the City of London but the land in between dips by about 10m.

Canonbury is traditionally an area of Islington, and has never been an administrative unit in its own right. For this reason it has never had formally defined boundaries, but approximates to the area between Essex Road, Upper Street and Cross Street and either side of St Paul's Road. The Canonbury electoral ward within the London Borough of Islington extends as far east as Southgate Road.

East Canonbury is the south-eastern corner of the district, bordering on the Regents Canal. Parts of this area were transferred to the district from the London Borough of Hackney in a boundary adjustment (along the line of the northern towpath of the canal), in 1993.

In the east is the Marquess Estate, a 1,200 dwelling council estate, completed in 1976 on 26 acres (110,000 m^{2}), and designed by Darbourne & Darke. A dark red brick, traffic free estate, it was praised as an example of municipal architecture, but acquired a bad reputation and has since been extensively redeveloped to improve security for residents.

== Places of interest ==
- Canonbury House and Canonbury Tower – The manor house of Canonbury was constructed by William Bolton of St Bartholomew's Priory between 1509 and 1532. At the dissolution of the monasteries it was granted to Thomas Cromwell. In the 1590s the manor house was rebuilt by Sir John Spencer, Lord Mayor of the City of London, including the construction of its tower. The tower has been occupied by many historical figures, including the philosopher and Lord Chancellor Francis Bacon, and the Irish novelist and playwright Oliver Goldsmith. The Tower Theatre Company was based here from 1953 to 2003. It is currently used as a Masonic research centre.
- Canonbury Square – Developed between 1805 and 1830, it includes a variety of distinct styles. In 1812, when few properties had been built, the New North Road turnpike, now known as Canonbury Road, was constructed and bisects the square. Many significant figures from the arts and literary worlds have lived on the square, including the writers George Orwell and Evelyn Waugh, and the actor Samuel Phelps.
- The Estorick Collection of Modern Italian Art is in Canonbury Square.
- John Spencer Square – A residential garden square named after Sir John Spencer, Lord Mayor of the City of London, former residents include Barbara Castle, Labour politician and former Secretary of State, and English constitutional historian David Starkey.
- New River Walk – The New River, an aqueduct built by Sir Hugh Myddelton to supply fresh water to London, was completed in 1613. The walk is in two parts, with a break at Willowbridge, and forms a segment of the much more extensive New River Path. The southern section received an early National Lottery grant, and has a back-pumping scheme which simulates the water flow of the original aqueduct.
- Arlington Square – voted one of the UK's best garden squares.

== Literary and artistic connections ==
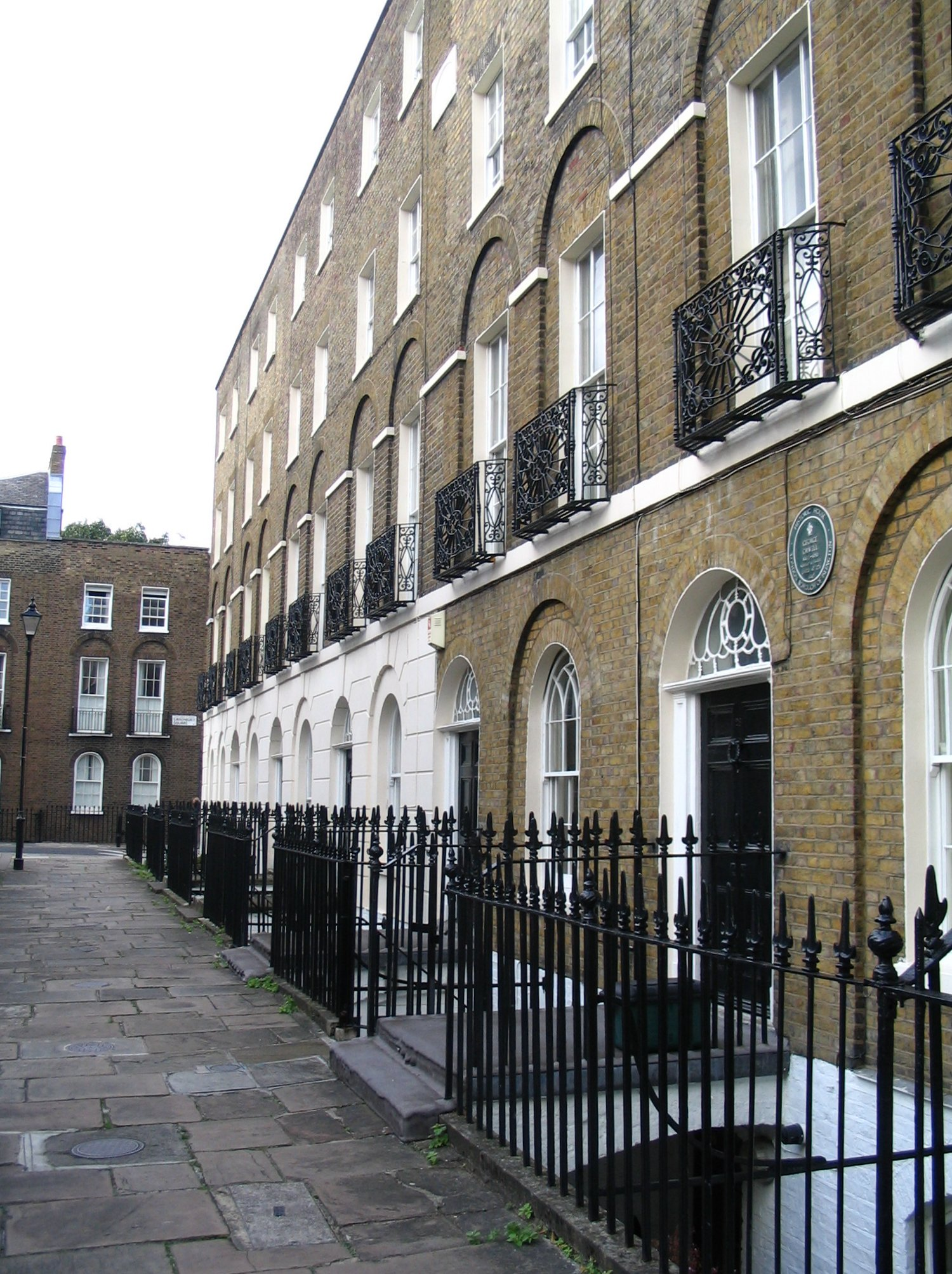
Canonbury Square

George Orwell moved to 27b Canonbury Square in the autumn of 1944 – he and his wife having been bombed out of their previous flat, in Mortimer Crescent, on 28 June 1944. Evelyn Waugh lived at 17a Canonbury Square from 1928 to 1930. Charles Dickens wrote a Christmas story about a lamplighter in Canonbury, which features the Tower. Leslie Forbes, the travel and detective story writer, and pseudohistorian Gavin Menzies both lived in the area. M. V. Hughes (née Thomas) lived at 1 Canonbury Park North (the house is no longer standing) as a child, and describes life there in her memoir A London Child of the 1870s. George and Weedon Grossmith, authors of The Diary of a Nobody, lived in Canonbury and set their tale in nearby Holloway.

== Churches ==
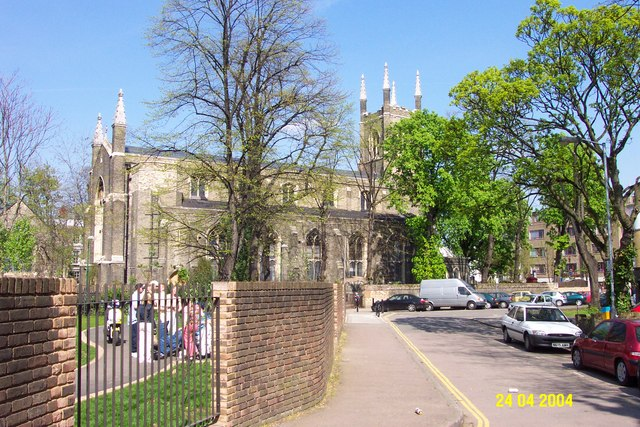
St Paul's Church, now a school

- St Paul's, at the junction of Essex Road and Balls Pond Road, was designed in 1826–28 by Charles Barry for the Church of England. Its parish was merged with St Jude, Mildmay and since 1997 the building has been used as a Steiner school.
- St Stephen's Church, Church of England, is on Canonbury Road and was built in 1839.

== Groups in Canonbury ==
- Greenpeace UK – offices based at Canonbury Villas.
- The Canonbury Society aims to conserve the special character of Canonbury by monitoring development.
- Islington & Stoke Newington (T.S. Quail) – Sea Cadet Unit
- The Islington Society was founded in 1960 to safeguard and improve the quality of life in Islington. It focuses on the built environment and public transport, but also takes a special interest in public services and open spaces.

== Politics ==
- Canonbury forms part of the Islington South and Finsbury parliamentary constituency. The constituency's MP is Labour politician Emily Thornberry. The Islington councillors representing the Canonbury ward are Alex Diner, Clare Jeapes and Nick Wayne (Labour).

== Demography ==
The 2021 census showed that the 12,665 population of Canonbury ward had the following ethnicity: 67.6% white (44.3% of UK origin), 6.8% black African, 6.7% Asian, 5.1% black Caribbean and 13.8% mixed/other.

== Transport and locale ==
A map showing the Canonbury ward of Islington Metropolitan Borough as it appeared in 1916.

=== Nearest stations ===
- Angel
- Essex Road
- Canonbury
- Highbury & Islington

=== Buses ===
London Buses routes 4, London Buses route 10 (1988–2018), 19, 30, 21 38, 56, 73, 236, 263, 341, 393 and 476 serve Canonbury.

== Education ==
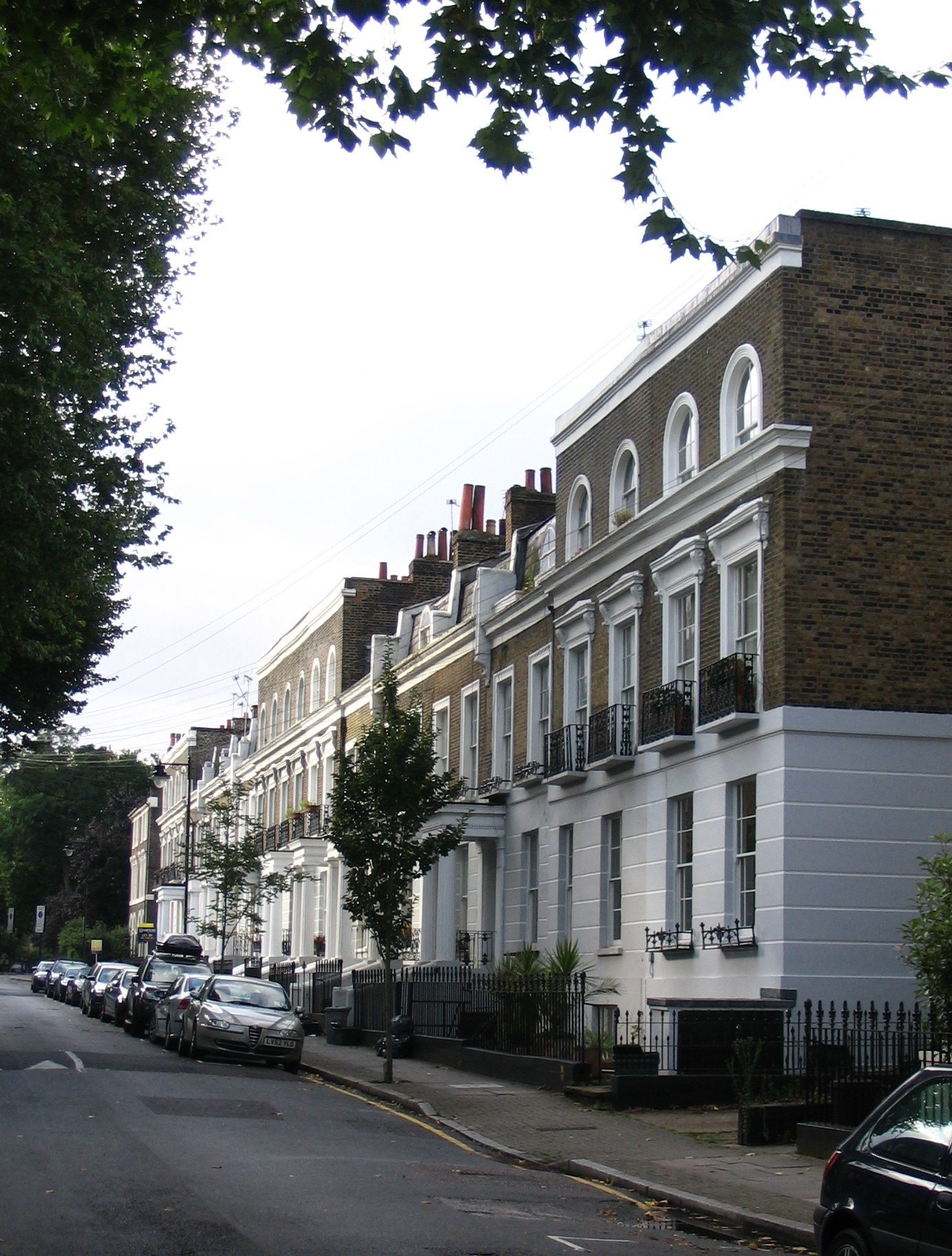
Compton Road

Canonbury Road School, now Canonbury Primary School, opened in 1877. It is a Community primary school taking boys and girls from 3 to 11 years of age. In 2010, the school was placed in special measures. By 2013, when Ofsted inspected Canonbury Primary School it was rated as a "Good" school. In 2013, there were 460 pupils on the school roll.

Founded as a charity school in 1710, St Mary's Church of England Primary School has, since 1967, been situated on Fowler Road in Canonbury. When Ofsted inspected the school in 2012 it was rated as a "Good" school and there were 178 pupils on the school roll.

North Bridge House Senior School is located in Canonbury House.

== Notable residents ==
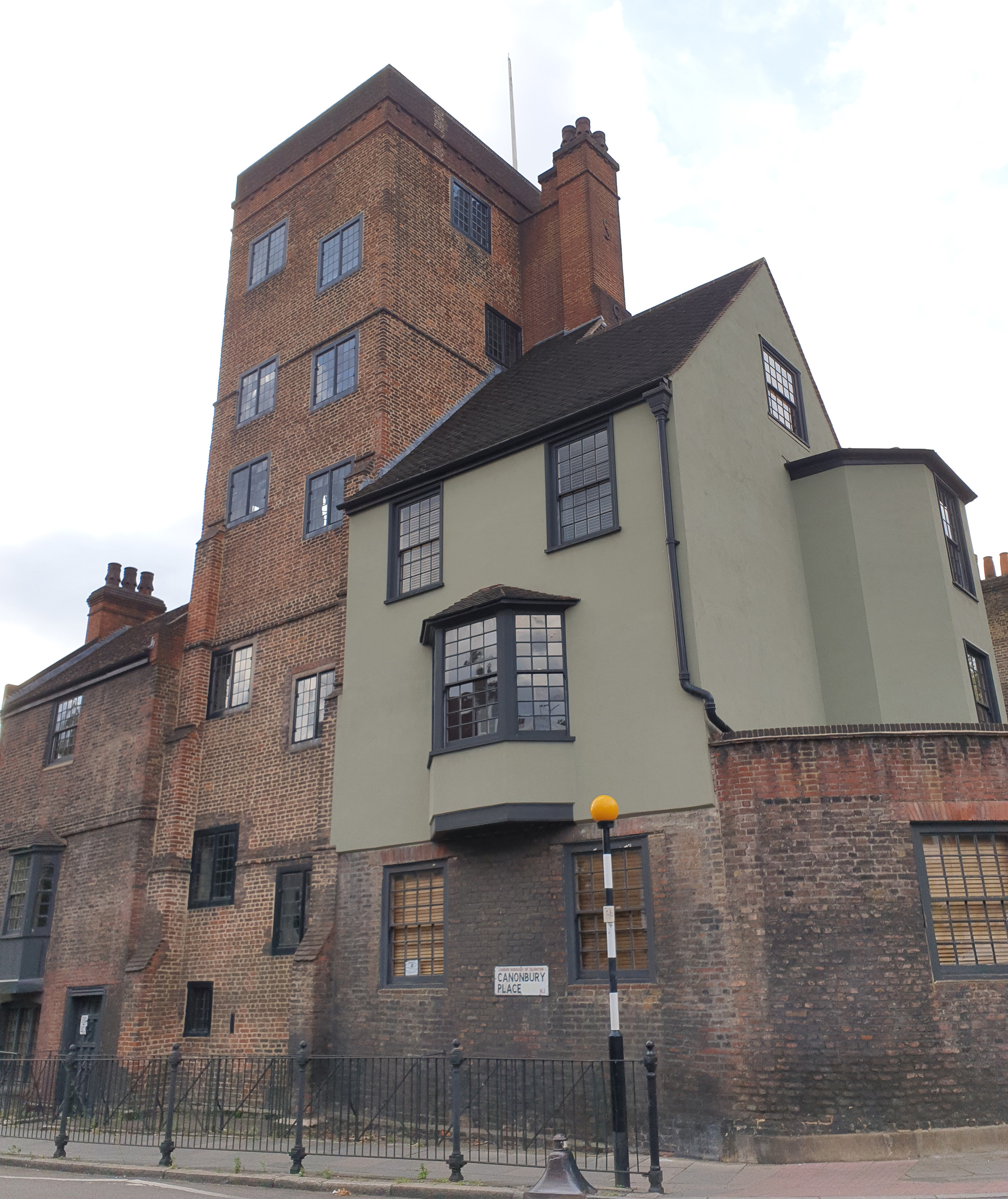
Canonbury Tower

- Thomas Cromwell, Lord Privy Seal, lived in Canonbury Tower from 1533 until his execution in 1540 by order of King Henry VIII
- Sir Francis Bacon, King James I's Lord Chancellor, lived in Canonbury Tower, 1616–1626
- William Babell, musician, died here in 1723
- Oliver Goldsmith, writer, lived in Canonbury Tower, 1762–1764
- Ephraim Chambers, encyclopaedist, lodged at Canonbury Tower
- Washington Irving, essayist, biographer and historian, briefly lodged at Canonbury Tower in the early 19th century
- George Grossmith and Weedon Grossmith, actors and writers, lived at 5 Canonbury Place
- John Newbery, publisher of children's literature, lived in Canonbury House
- Christopher Smart, poet, lived in Canonbury House
- Francis Ronalds, inventor of the electric telegraph, lived at 11 Canonbury Place as a child
- Edmund Ronalds, chemist, was born at 48 Canonbury Square and later lived at the east end of Canonbury Place
- Thomas Field Gibson, Royal Commissioner for the Great Exhibition of 1851, was born at 2 Canonbury Place
- Molly Hughes, educator and author, chronicled her childhood in Canonbury in A London Child of the 1870s growing up in a house that "stood at the corner of two roads" with a view down the length of Grange Grove (1 Canonbury Park North)
- George Orwell, writer, lived at 27b Canonbury Square
- Evelyn Waugh, writer, lived at 17a Canonbury Square
- Duncan Grant and Vanessa Bell, painters and designers, lived at 26a Canonbury Square
- Professor Sir Basil Spence, architect, lived and worked at 1 Canonbury Place from 1956 until his death in 1976. He is commemorated with a blue plaque
- Dame Flora Robson, actress, lived in Alwyne Villas
- Louis Macneice, poet, lived at 52 Canonbury Park South from 1947 to 1952 and is commemorated with a blue plaque
- Barbara Castle, politician, and Ted Castle, journalist, lived in John Spencer Square
- John Stonehouse, politician, lived in Alwyne Road
- Richard Adams, writer, lived and wrote at 26, St Paul's Place, 1952–1974
- Alan Davies, actor/comedian lived in Myddleton Cottage on Canonbury Park South
- Spider Stacy, founding member of the Pogues
- Harry Randall, music hall and pantomime comedian lived at 4 Canonbury Grove and 2 Alwyne Place
- Cate Blanchett, actress, lived at 7 Canonbury Grove
- Chester P, UK hip-hop artist, member of Task Force and M.U.D. Family
- Dame Stella Rimington, head of MI5, lived at 7 Canonbury Grove, in Alwyne Road and in Alwyne Place
- Sir John Mummery PC, DL, a Lord Justice of Appeal
- Sir Nicholas Barrington, ex UK high commissioner to Pakistan
- William Greaves, co-founder of Capital Kids' Cricket lived at 13 Canonbury Grove
- Charlie Weaver, member and front man of Lonsdale Boys Club
- Sir John Tusa, broadcaster and arts administrator
- Terry Farrell, architect, lived in Canonbury; the Lost River Walk in his masterplan for Earls Court was inspired by the New River Walk.
- Kenneth Griffith, actor, producer, presenter and historian, lived at 8 Alwyne Place, which he named Spion Kop
- Dido, singer, lived at 1 Willow Bridge Road
- Colin Firth, actor, lived on Willow Bridge Road.
- Alison Moyet, singer, lived at 6 Alwyne Road
- Keira Knightley and her husband James Righton lived at 9 Alwyne Road.
- Kit Harington, actor, moved into Canonbury in 2015
- James Bay, singer, moved to Canonbury in 2016
- Gareth Morris, principal flute, Philharmonia and New Philharmonia Orchestras (1948–1972) also principal flute professor of Royal Academy of Music (1945–1985), resident of 4 Alwyne Place from 1945 to 1987
- Allegra Stratton, Downing Street Press Secretary from 2020 to 2021, and her husband James Forsyth, political editor of The Spectator
- Paul Whitehouse, actor and comedian
- Emma Watson, actress, lived at 2 Canonbury Place

== Sources ==
- Baggs, A. P.; Bolton, Diane K.; Croot, Patricia E. C., eds. (1985). A History of the County of Middlesex: Volume 8, Islington and Stoke Newington Parishes. London: Victoria County History.
- Cosh, Mary (1993). The Squares of Islington: Part II. London: Islington Archaeology & History Society. ISBN 0-9507532-6-2.
- Fincham, Henry. W. (1912). "An Historical account of Canonbury Tower". Journal of the British Archaeological Association. 18 (1): 13–24. doi:10.1080/00681288.1912.11893802.
- Thornbury, Walter (1878). Old and New London: Volume 2. London: Cassell, Petter & Galpin. pp. 269–273.
- Tomlins, Thomas Edlyne (1858). Yseldon: A Perambulation of Islington. London: James S. Hodson; K. J. Ford. ISBN 978-1153222815.
