= Southgate Road =

Coordinates: 51.543508°N 0.084237°W

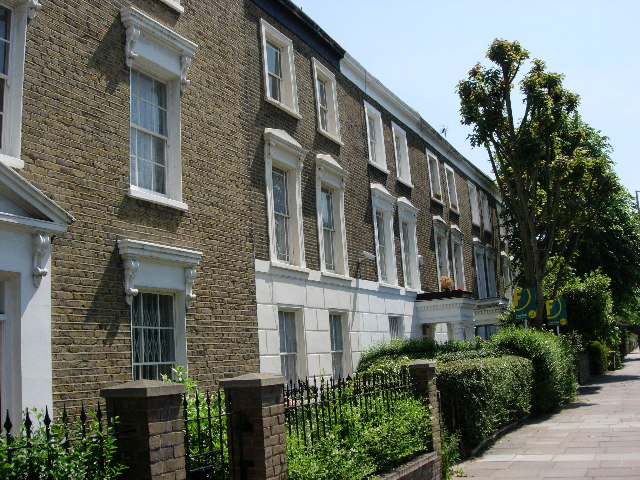
- Houses on Southgate_Road, Islington

- Location within Greater London
- OS grid reference: TQ325845
- London borough: Hackney; Islington
- Ceremonial county: Greater London
- Region: London
- Country: England
- Sovereign state: United Kingdom
- Post town: LONDON
- Postcode district: N1
- Dialling code: 020
- Police: Metropolitan
- Fire: London
- Ambulance: London
- UK Parliament: Islington South and Finsbury; Hackney South and Shoreditch
- London Assembly: North East; North East

Southgate Road is a street in London, England, that runs from Baring Street in the south to the junction with Mildmay Park and Ball's Pond Road in the north. The street forms a part of the B102 road, leading from Newington Green to The City. The west side of Southgate Road is in the London Borough of Islington; and the east side is in the London Borough of Hackney. Southgate Road lies north of the Regent's Canal, west of De Beauvoir Town and east of Essex Road.

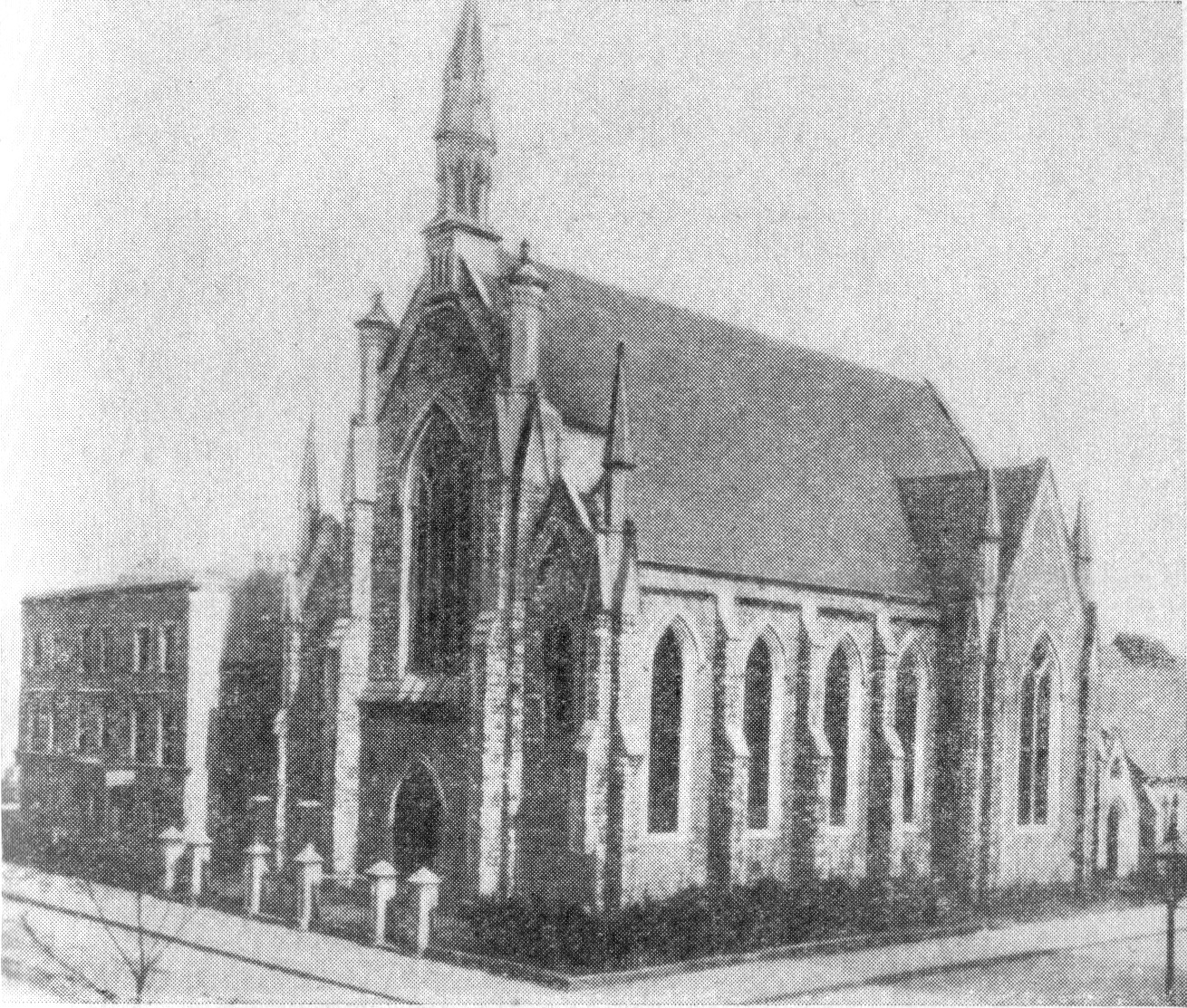
Brotherhood Church, Southgate Road, London

Joseph Stalin, Vladimir Lenin and Leon Trotsky visited Southgate Road for the 5th Congress of the Russian Social Democratic Labour Party in 1907, which was held at the Brotherhood Church which once stood on the northern corner of Southgate Road and Balmes Road.

In the 1950s the area was a popular area for musicians and artists, so much so that Salvador Dalí and Buddy Holly opened a short lived nightclub called the Loyala on the corner on Balls Pond Road. It closed down after three months due to the lack of a licence.

Today, a number of new developments are assisting in the regeneration of the area.

== Transport ==
Southgate Road has three main bus routes that provide residents direct routes into the City and West End as well as the outer London areas.

- 21: Newington Green – Lewisham
- 76: Tottenham Hale station – Waterloo
- 141: Palmers Green – London Bridge station

Nearest London Underground stations:

- Northern line

- Angel tube station
- Old Street tube station

- Victoria line

- Highbury & Islington station

Nearest National Rail stations:

- First Capital Connect

- Essex Road station
- Highbury & Islington station
- Old Street station

- London Overground

- Dalston Junction
- Dalston Kingsland
- Haggerston
- Canonbury
- Highbury & Islington

== Nearest areas ==
- Angel
- Canonbury
- De Beauvoir Town
- Finsbury
- Highbury
- Hoxton
- Mildmay
- Newington Green
