= Route 21 (disambiguation) =

Route 21 may refer to:

- Route 21 (MTA Maryland), a bus route in Baltimore, Maryland
- London Buses route 21
- West Midlands bus route 21, a bus route in Coventry, England
- Shanghai Metro Line 21, a subway line in Shanghai
- 21 Hayes, a bus route in San Francisco

== See also ==
- List of highways numbered 21
- Bus 21
- Line 21 (disambiguation)
