= CKC =

CKC is a three-letter acronym that may stand for:

- Canadian Kennel Club, one of the national kennel clubs of Canada
- Canoe Kayak Canada
- Cervical conization, cold knife conization
- Chicago–Kansas City Expressway
- Capital Kids' Cricket, charity, London, UK
- Christ the King College, Onitsha, or CKC Onitsha, Nigeria
- CKC Chinese Input System
- Closed kinetic chain exercises, physical exercises performed where the hand or foot is fixed in space and cannot move
- The IATA code for Cherkasy International Airport, Cherkasy Oblast, Ukraine
