= Bus 21 =

Bus 21 may refer to:

== Gaming ==
Bus Simulator 21

== Bus route ==
West Midlands Bus route 21

London Buses route 21
