= John Spencer (Lord Mayor of London) =

English merchant and Lord Mayor of London

Sir John Spencer (died 1610) was a successful English merchant and Lord Mayor of London.

== Life ==
He was the son of Richard Spencer of Waldingfield in Suffolk, came to London, and as a merchant was nicknamed "Rich Spencer". His trade with Spain, Turkey, and Venice was substantial, and he was accused in 1591 of engrossing, with two other merchants, the whole trade with Tripoli. Queen Elizabeth I is said to have visited him at Canonbury House in 1581, a property he bought from Thomas Wentworth, 2nd Baron Wentworth in 1570.

Spencer was a member of the Clothworkers' Company, and was elected alderman of Langbourn ward on 9 August 1587. He served the office of Sheriff of the City of London in 1584–5, and that of Lord Mayor of London in 1594–5. During his shrievalty he was engaged in hunting down papists in and around Holborn and the adjoining localities, and had to justify before the council the committal of Anthony Bassano and others among her majesty's musicians. The end of 1594 was a time of great scarcity, and Spencer sent his precept to the city companies to replenish their store of corn at the granaries in the Bridge House for sale to the poor. He resisted a demand by Admiral Sir John Hawkins for possession of the Bridge House for the use of the navy and baking biscuits for the fleet.

Spencer kept his mayoralty at his town residence, Crosby Place in Bishopsgate Street, which he had purchased and restored. (It had passed from Antonio Bonvisi to alderman William Bond, father of Martin Bond.) In this sumptuous mansion during the course of 1604 Spencer entertained both the Duc de Sully (then M. de Rosny), while ambassador to England, and the youngest son of the Prince of Orange, with Barnevelt and Fulke, who came on a mission from Holland. Towards the close of his mayoralty he asserted the City of London's right, which it was feared the Crown would contest, to freely elect a recorder. Before the close of his mayoralty he received a knighthood.

In May 1609 Spencer refused to contribute to an aid for James I on behalf of the young Henry Frederick, Prince of Wales; he also delayed his contribution of £200 to the amount subscribed by the Clothworkers' Company to the Ulster settlement, which was paid by his executors. Spencer was president of St. Bartholomew's Hospital from 1603.

Spencer died, at an advanced age, on 3 March 1610, and his widow survived him only till 27 March. He was buried on 22 March, and Dame Alice on 7 April, in his parish church of St Helen, Bishopsgate, where an altar tomb monument was placed to his memory. His funeral was on a most sumptuous scale. His fortune was variously estimated at very large sums, and the splendid inheritance is said for the time to have turned the brain of his son-in-law, Lord Compton. Among other estates, he possessed the manors of Brooke Hall, Bower Hall, and Bocking, which he had obtained from the Queen on 1 August, 1599. Spencer left nothing to public purposes.

In Canonbury, a residential square was laid out in 1963 and is named after Sir John Spencer. He, at the time, was Lord Mayor of London and had a country retreat at Canonbury in the early 17th Century. John Spencer Square’s former residents include Labour Party Cabinet Minister Barbara Castle and her husband Ted Castle, journalist and GLC Alderman.

== Family ==
By his wife, Alice Bromfield, Spencer had an only child, Elizabeth, who in 1598 was sought in marriage by William Compton, 2nd Lord Compton. Spencer strongly disapproved of the match, but Compton's influence at court enabled him to procure Spencer's imprisonment in the Fleet Prison in March 1599 for ill-treating his daughter. The young lady was ultimately carried off by her lover from Canonbury Tower in a baker's basket. The marriage quickly followed, but Spencer gave his daughter no marriage portion. When, in May 1601, his daughter became a mother, he showed no signs of relenting. But some reconciliation apparently took place soon afterwards, it is said, through the intervention of Elizabeth.

== Notes ==
Civic offices
| Preceded by Richard Martin | Lord Mayor of London; 1594–1595 | Succeeded by Stephen Slaney |

Attribution

This article incorporates text from a publication now in the public domain: Lee, Sidney, ed. (1898). "Spencer, John (d.1610)". Dictionary of National Biography. Vol. 53. London: Smith, Elder & Co.
