= John Spencer Square =

Residential building in London, England

General information
- Location: John Spencer Square; London, N1; United Kingdom
- Coordinates: 51.5461°N 0.0993°W
- Completed: 1965

Design and construction
- Architect(s): William Floyd Nash

Website
- https://www.johnspencersquare.com/

John Spencer Square is a neo-Georgian residential garden square in the heart of the Canonbury conservation area in Islington, London.

It is named after Sir John Spencer, a wealthy city merchant and Lord Mayor of London in 1594, who lived in nearby Canonbury House as his fashionable country retreat.

== History ==
The neo-Georgian open quadrangle apartment blocks, bordered by Compton Road, St. Pauls Road, Prior Bolton Street and St Mary's Grove, were built on land sold in 1954 by the Earl of Northampton to property companies Western Ground Rents and Oriel Property trust. It was designed by William Floyd Nash in a neo-Georgian style reflecting the 18th century architecture of Canonbury.

In the early 1950s, most of the Victorian villas on the site were bomb-damaged or dilapidated and planning permission for a development was granted in 1963 by Islington Borough Council.

The development, comprising 80 apartments of one to three bedrooms, was built by Canonbury Construction Co. in 1963-4. The first residents, some still living at the square, purchased their off-plan flats for under £5,000 in 1964, before building was completed and took up residence in April 1965.

The John Spencer Square Management Company acquired the freehold in 1985 and still manage the estate.

== Notable residents ==
- Barbara Castle, Former First Secretary of State and Labour politician
- David Starkey, English constitutional historian
- George Brown, Former Foreign Secretary under Harold Wilson
- Tony Hadley, English pop singer
- Arthur Mullard, British actor
