= London Buses route 271 =

Former London bus route

271
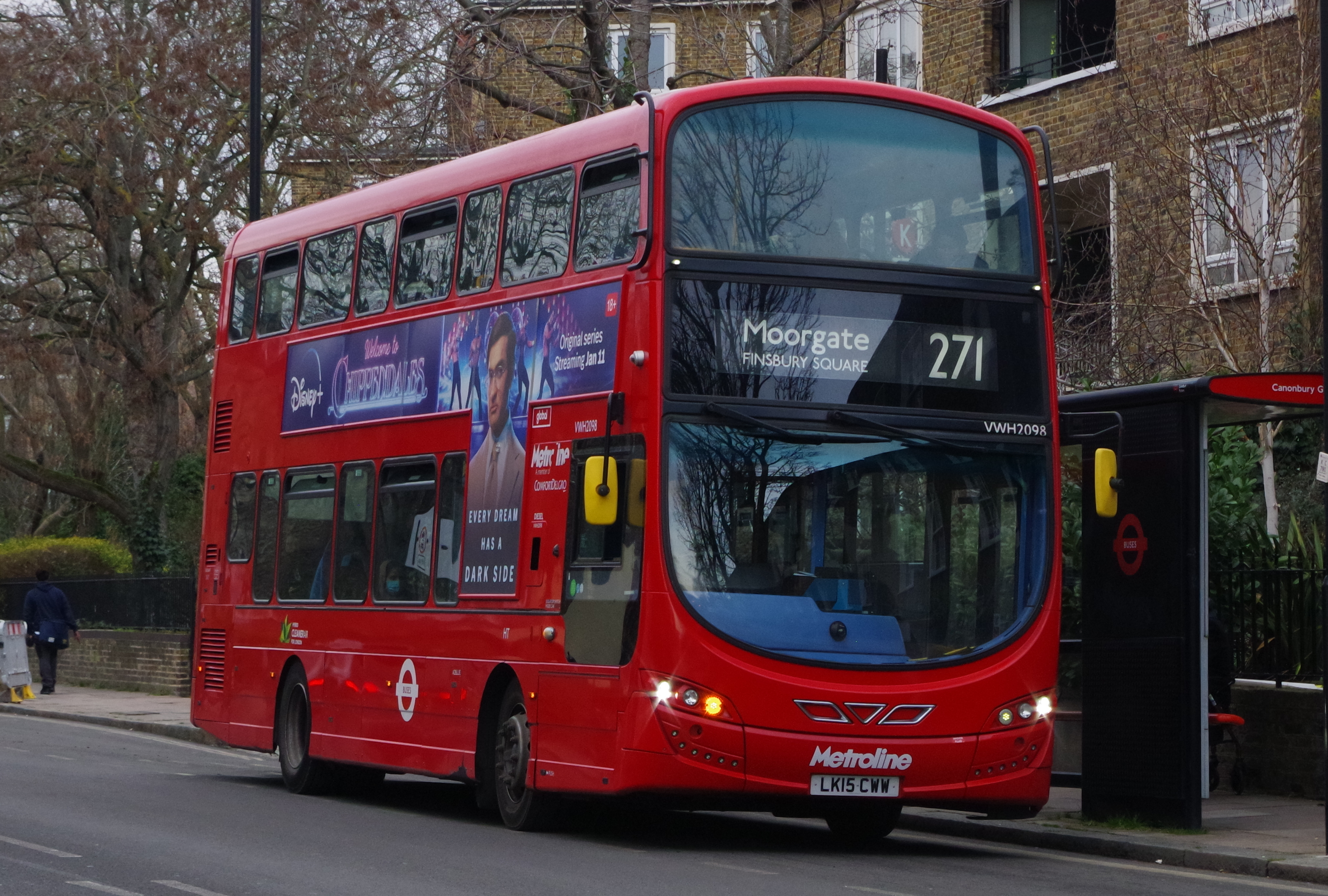
- Metroline Wright Eclipse Gemini 3 bodied Volvo B5LH near Highbury Corner in February 2023

Overview
- Operator: Metroline
- Garage: Holloway
- Vehicle: Volvo B5LH Wright Eclipse Gemini 3
- Peak vehicle requirement: Day: 13; Night: 2
- Status: Defunct
- Began service: 20 July 1960
- Ended service: 4 February 2023
- Night-time: 24-hour service

Route
- Start: Highgate Village
- Via: Archway; Holloway; Islington; Hoxton
- End: Finsbury Square
- Length: 5 miles (8.0 km)

Service
- Level: 24-hour service
- Frequency: About every 9-15 minutes
- Journey time: 23-43 minutes
- Operates: 24-hour service

London Buses route 271 was a Transport for London contracted bus route in London, England. It ran between Highgate Village and Finsbury Square, and was last operated by Metroline.

== History ==
Route 271 commenced operating on 20 July 1960 running between Highgate Village and Finsbury Square to replace trolleybus route 611 with AEC Routemasters. The route was initially operated out of Holloway garage and has changed little since its introduction.

On 7 November 1965, new Leyland Atlanteans commenced a six-month trial on route 271. On 17 April 1966, eight XF-class Daimler Fleetlines were transferred from London Country Bus Services's East Grinstead garage to Holloway and replaced by XA-class Leyland Atlanteans. After the fuel consumption of the two vehicles was compared, the eight XF-class buses returned to East Grinstead.

On 10 July 1966, route 271 returned to AEC Routemaster operation. On 16 January 1971, it was converted to one-man operation with Daimler Fleetlines.

On 6 June 1987 the route was extended on Sundays from Highgate Village to Hendon Central station to cover the withdrawn part of route 143, although this extension only lasted until 2 February 1991.

For an eight-month period from September 1990, the route was based at Chalk Farm garage, before returning to Holloway.

On 16 May 1992 the route received a weekend extension to Liverpool Street station.

Upon tendering in September 1993, the route transferred to London Suburban Bus, operated from a garage in Edmonton, using red, brown and cream livered Northern Counties Palatine bodied Volvo Olympians.

Route 271 was included in the April 1996 sale of London Suburban Bus to MTL London and transferred back to Holloway, with the existing buses repainted in MTL's red livery. MTL London in turn was sold in August 1998 to Metroline. The route received low-floor buses in 1999.

Upon being re-tendered, the route was retained by Metroline with a new contract commencing on 30 September 2005.

On 18 June 2011, route 271 was withdrawn between Finsbury Square and Liverpool Street station due to Crossrail works. When re-tendered, it was retained by Metroline with a new contract commencing on 29 September 2012 with existing double deckers.

In 2018, Transport for London consulted on proposals to withdraw the N271 night bus route. In April 2019, it announced that it would not go ahead with the proposals and that the N271 route would continue to operate.

=== Withdrawal ===
On 4 February 2023, route 271 was withdrawn during the daytime following a successful consultation in early 2022. The night service was re-numbered route N271 and extended to North Finchley. Routes 21 and 263 were revised to replace it either side of Holloway during the day.

== Former route ==
Route 271 operated via these primary locations:

- Highgate Village South Grove
- Archway station
- Upper Holloway station
- Holloway Road station
- Highbury & Islington station
- Essex Road station
- Old Street station
- Finsbury Square
