= Line 21 =

Line 21 may refer to:

== Closed captioning ==
- EIA-608, a standard for closed captioning for NTSC TV broadcast, also known as "line 21 captions"

== Telecommunications ==
Line 21, a Hungarian telecommunications company Vodafone Hungary

== Railways ==
=== In operation ===
- Line 21 (Guangzhou Metro), a metro line of the Guangzhou Metro in China
- Line 21 (Zürich), Switzerland
- Yangluo Line, a metro line of the Wuhan Metro in China

=== Under planning ===
- Line 21 (São Paulo Metro), a future metro line of the São Paulo metro
- Line 21 (Shanghai Metro), a future metro line of Shanghai Metro

== See also ==
- Route 21 (disambiguation)
