= London Buses route 10 (1988–2018) =

Former bus route in England

10
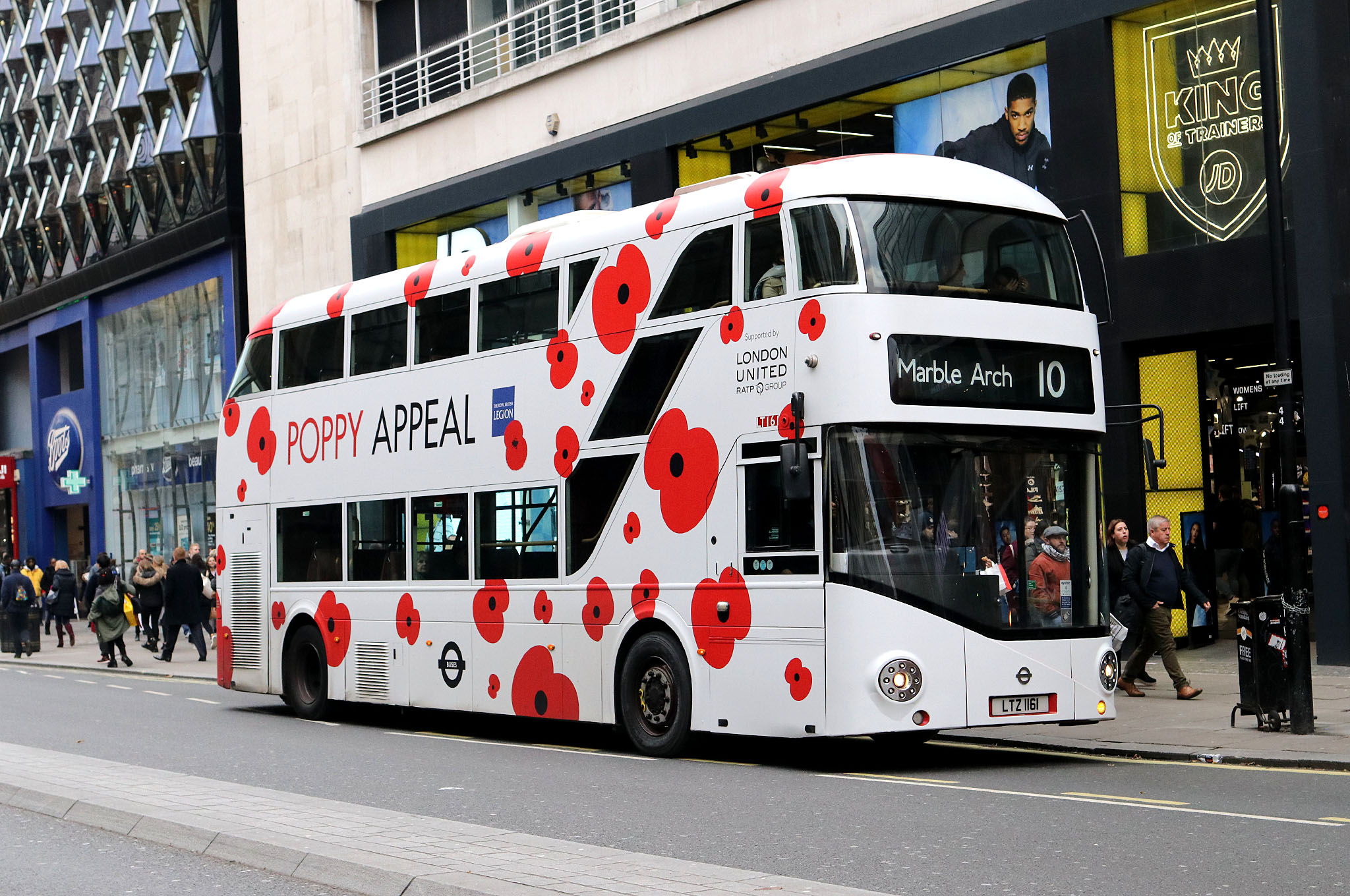
- London United New Routemaster on Oxford Street in November 2018

Overview
- Operator: London United
- Garage: Stamford Brook
- Vehicle: New Routemaster
- Peak vehicle requirement: Day: 23; Night: 4
- Status: Defunt
- Began service: 13 August 1988
- Ended service: 24 November 2018
- Predecessors: Route 73
- Night-time: 24-hour service

Route
- Start: Hammersmith bus station
- Via: Kensington; Knightsbridge; Hyde Park Corner; Oxford Circus; Russell Square
- End: King's Cross station
- Length: 7 miles (11 km)

Service
- Level: 24-hour service
- Frequency: About every 8-12 minutes
- Journey time: 36-74 minutes
- Operates: 24-hour service

London Buses route 10 was a Transport for London contracted bus route in London, England. It ran between Hammersmith bus station and King's Cross station, and was last operated by London United in 2018.

== History ==
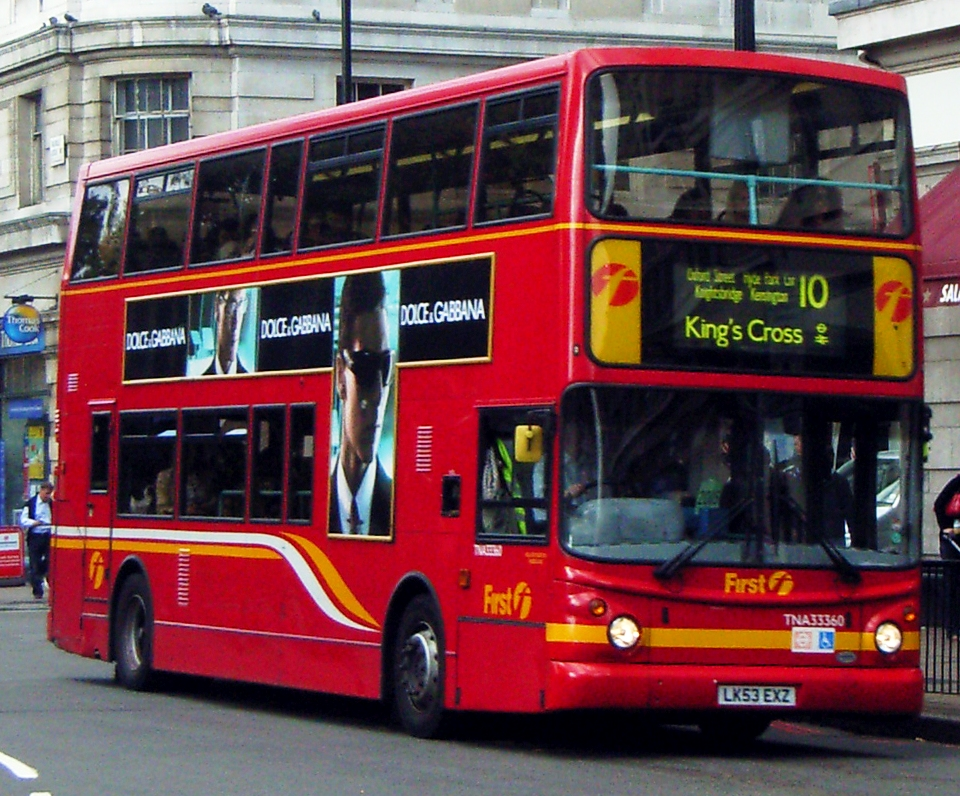
First London TransBus ALX400 bodied TransBus Trident in October 2007

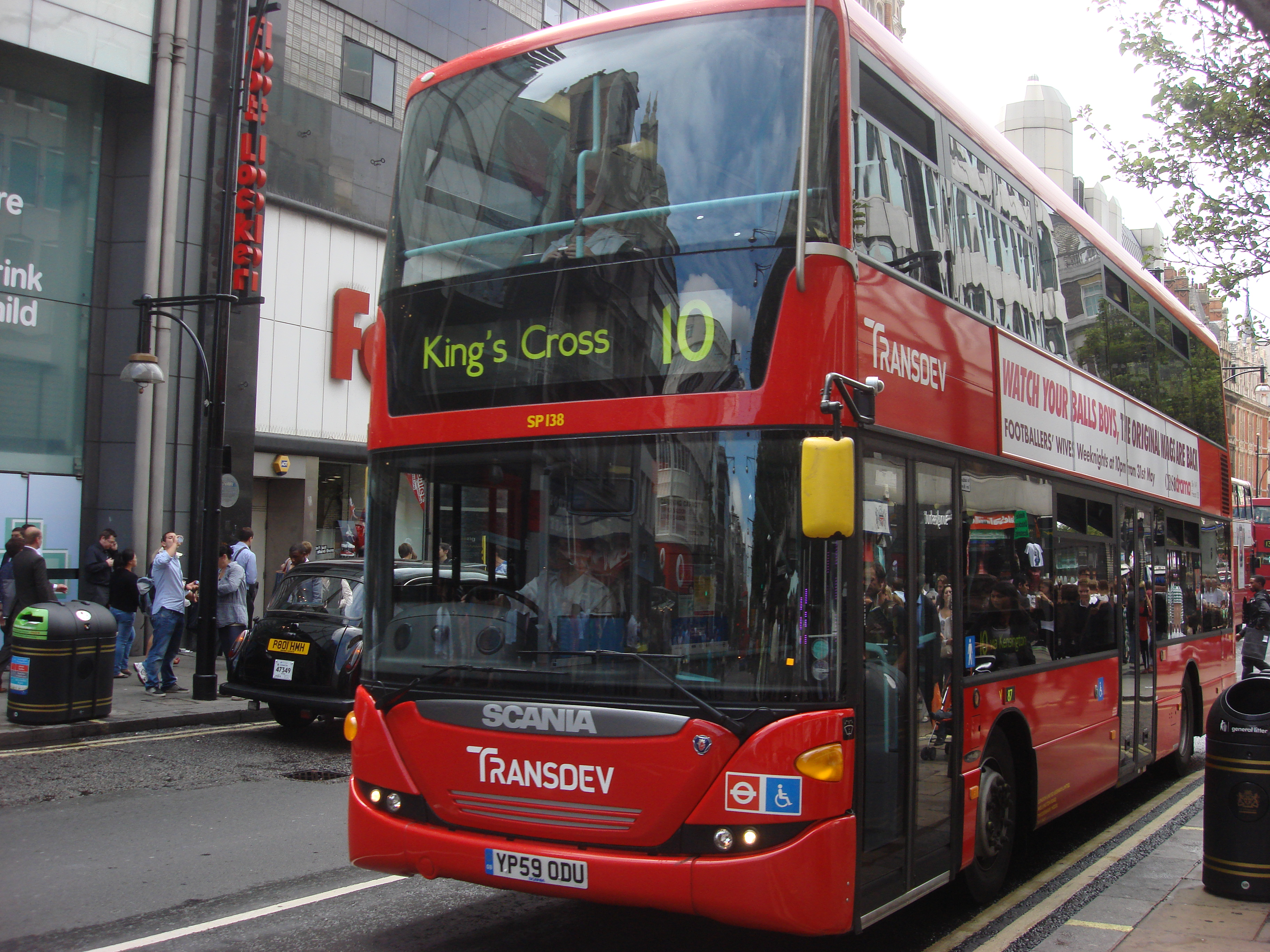
Transdev London Scania OmniCity on Oxford Street in July 2010

Route 10 commenced on 13 August 1988 to replace route 73 between Hammersmith and Hyde Park Corner following the latter being diverted to Victoria. The initial route was between Hammersmith and King's Cross, and was run by the London United division. In April 1989, an allocation was introduced from the London Northern garage at Holloway. Route 10 was extended to the back of Holloway garage via York Way and Brecknock Road. Initially this section did not run during early mornings, late evenings or Sundays, but a Sunday service was later added. Some journeys were then extended to Archway rather than terminating in Tufnell Park. These were then withdrawn, but were reinstated following the withdrawal of local route C12 in 1998.

As part of a restructuring of services in the lead-up to the introduction of the London congestion charge, on 1 February 2003, route 10 was split in two: the route between Archway and Kings Cross, and as far as Marble Arch, was taken over by new route 390, and route 10 was shortened to serve only its original route between Hammersmith and King's Cross. Route 390 continued to be operated by Metroline with the AEC Routemasters which had operated route 10, while the new route 10 was operated by First London with Alexander ALX400 bodied Volvo B7TLs.

When next tendered, the route was awarded to Transdev London from 30 January 2010. It was operated out of Stamford Brook garage.

New Routemasters were introduced on 26 April 2014. The rear platform remained open from Monday to Friday between 06:00 and 19:30 when it was staffed by a conductor. This was ceased in September 2016 when conductors were withdrawn.

In 2015, Transport for London consulted on rerouting route 10 to serve Russell Square station. The route was modified on 25 June 2016. London United successfully tendered to retain the route from 28 January 2017 with a peak vehicle requirement of 23.

As part of a programme to reduce the number of bus routes traversing Oxford Street, route 10 ceased running on 24 November 2018, with the Marble Arch to Hammersmith section being replaced by a redirected route 23.

== Former route ==
Route 10 operated via these primary locations:

- Hammersmith bus station for Hammersmith station
- Hammersmith Broadway
- Brook Green
- Kensington (Olympia) station
- High Street Kensington station
- Kensington Palace
- Royal Albert Hall
- Knightsbridge station
- Hyde Park Corner station
- Marble Arch station
- Selfridges
- Oxford Circus station
- Tottenham Court Road station
- British Museum
- Russell Square station
- Euston bus station for Euston station
- British Library
- St Pancras International station
- King's Cross station

== Reintroduction in 2026 ==
In November 2025, Transport for London proposed to reintroduce route 10 to operate between Mildmay Park and Battersea Bridge. In July 2026, TfL announced that route 10 would be introduced on 14 November 2026, however having its northern terminus changed to Newington Green, to maintain excessive capacity between Essex Road and Holborn and to keep Central London and Battersea Bridge directly connected. On 22 September 2026, TfL awarded the contract for route 10 to Arriva London, who will use New Routemasters to operate the route from Clapton garage.
