= Capital Kids' Cricket =

Capital Kids' Cricket (CKC) is an initiative and a charity based in London, to promote the playing of cricket in state schools in the capital of the United Kingdom.

== Origins ==
In Britain, but especially London, during the 1970s and the 1980s the teaching and playing of cricket was dying in schools funded by the state, for many complex reasons and by 1990 only 20 out of more than 800 such schools in London were playing the game. The teaching of cricket has declined throughout England in recent years, but the issue is compounded in London as there are few local teams with their own grounds on which children can be taught. To counter this lack of interest, CKC was set up by two Yorkshiremen William Greaves and Hayden Turner, who have a passion for cricket, and were concerned at its decline.

== Position today ==
Now more than half the schools in London teach cricket, and promote the ethos that the game has traditionally provided. Volunteers have been found to help develop the sport in schools, and annual competitions have been arranged with the winners playing their final at the MCC Indoor School at Lord's Cricket Ground.

== Support ==
The charity is sponsored both corporately and individually, and especially with the help of active and retired cricketers. The Foundation for Sport and the Arts, Lord's Taverners, British Land plc, Sportsmatch and the MCC support in various ways. Individuals are invited to join the Heavy Rollers, a little joke suggesting that they possess money and propel the heavy roller used to flatten the cricket wicket. The Heavy Rollers are led by Head Groundsman, Clive Lloyd, the ex-West Indies captain and assistant head groundsmen, who are senior cricketers such as Mike Brearley, Roland Butcher, Donald Carr, Mike Denness, Ted Dexter, Paul Downton, John Edrich, Keith Fletcher, Angus Fraser, Mike Gatting, Graham Gooch, David Gower, Tom Graveney, Tony Lewis, Brian Luckhurst, Alec Stewart, Bob Willis and Don Wilson. Others can join on the payment of a small contribution.

== 20th anniversary ==
In 2010 the charity celebrated its 20th anniversary. At a well attended bash at the HQ of Westminster City Council, a celebration was held, attended by seven mayors of London Boroughs wearing their insignias of office – their mayoral chains – who informally and affectionately refer to themselves as the chain gang.
