= Essex Road railway station =

Railway station in Greater London, England

Essex Road
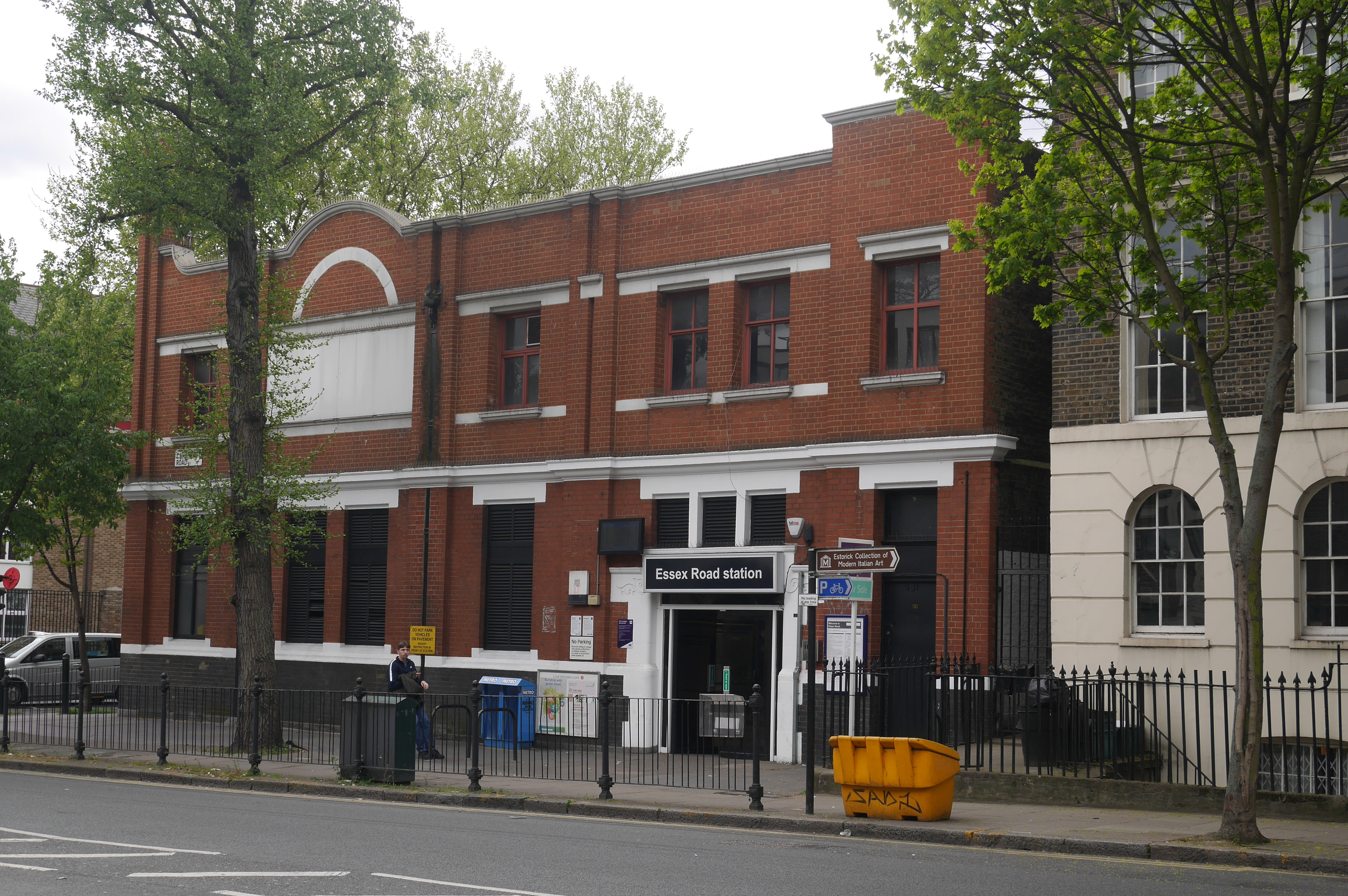
- Entrance on Canonbury Road
- Interactive map of Essex Road

General information
- Location: Canonbury
- Local authority: London Borough of Islington
- Managed by: Great Northern
- Owner: Network Rail
- Station code: EXR
- DfT category: E
- Number of platforms: 2
- Fare zone: 2

National Rail annual entry and exit
- 2020–21: ▼0.197 million
- 2021–22: ▲0.408 million
- 2022–23: ▲0.560 million
- 2023–24: ▲0.597 million
- 2024–25: ▲0.698 million

Key dates
- 14 February 1904: Opened (GN&CR)
- 4 October 1975: Closed (Northern City Line)
- 8 August 1976: Opened (British Rail City Line)

Other information
- External links: Departures; Facilities
- Coordinates: 51.5406°N 0.0963°W

Essex Road is a National Rail station in Canonbury in Greater London, England, and is on the Northern City Line between Old Street and Highbury & Islington, 1 mile 59 chains (2.8 km) down the line from Moorgate, and is in London fare zone 2. The station is at the junction of Essex Road, Canonbury Road and New North Road, with the present entrance on Canonbury Road. Operated by Great Northern, it is the only deep-level underground station in London served exclusively by National Rail trains. Between 1933 and 1975 the station was operated as part of the London Underground, on a short branch of the Northern line. Between 1922 and 1948 the station name was Canonbury & Essex Road. The name reverted to the original form in 1948.

== History ==
The station was opened on 14 February 1904 by the Great Northern & City Railway (GN&CR) on its underground route between the Great Northern Railway (GNR) station at Finsbury Park and the Metropolitan Railway (MR) and City & South London Railway (C&SLR) station at Moorgate in the City of London.

The GN&CR was intended to carry main line trains and the tunnels were constructed with a larger diameter (16 ft; 4.9 m) than the other deep tube railways being built at that time (roughly 11 to 12 ft; 3.4 to 3.7 m). From 1913 the MR took control of the GN&CR and ran it under its own name until it became part of the London Passenger Transport Board (LPTB) in 1933. In preparation for the LPTB's Northern Heights plan, the line was transferred to the control of the Morden-Edgware Line (now the Northern line).

The Northern Heights plan involved the building of a connection to the surface platforms at Finsbury Park and the transfer of a London and North Eastern Railway (LNER) branch from there to Edgware, High Barnet and Alexandra Palace. By 1939 much of the work for the connection of the lines had been done and the opening of the connection was scheduled for autumn 1940 but the start of World War II put a halt to further construction. After the war the uncompleted parts of the plan were cancelled and Northern line trains continued to run to Finsbury Park on what became known as the Northern City Line or, from 1970, the Northern line Highbury Branch.

The station was, from the early 1960s, closed on Sundays. In the 1970s it was also closed on Saturdays.

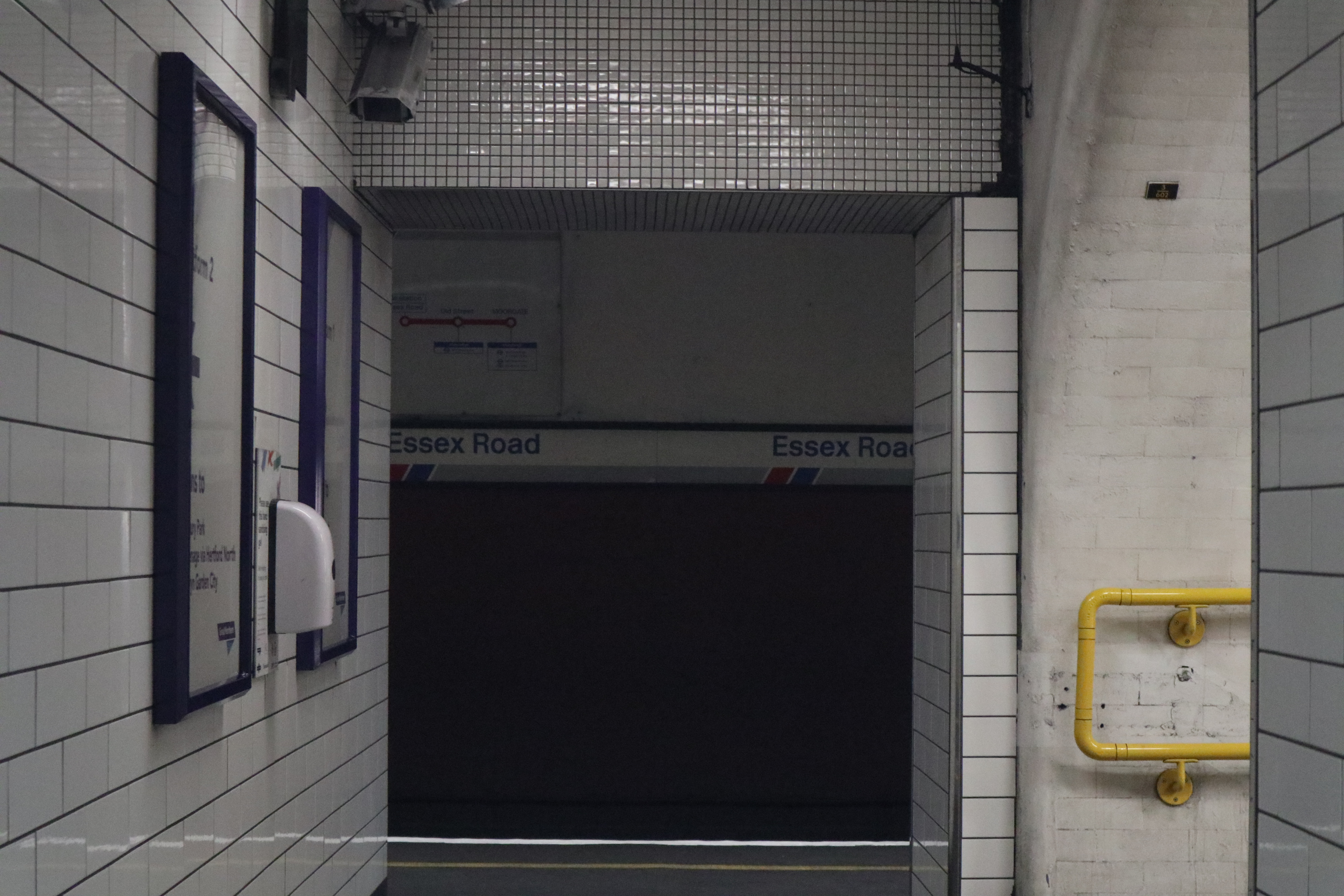
Inside Essex Road featuring Network South East Branding.

The Northern City Line was closed on 4 October 1975 (due to its weekend closure, Essex Road closed the day before) and ceased to be part of the London Underground. The line was transferred to British Rail (BR) and the unused connection between Drayton Park and Finsbury Park from the cancelled Northern Heights plan finally received the tracks to connect the line to the surface platforms at Finsbury Park. On 8 August 1976, the City Line reopened as part of the BR network with main line size trains running to Old Street. On 8 November 1976, seventy-two years after the GN&CR first opened, the line was opened fully for main line trains from Moorgate to Finsbury Park and beyond as had been originally intended. It is the only underground station on this line not operated by London Underground or Transport for London.

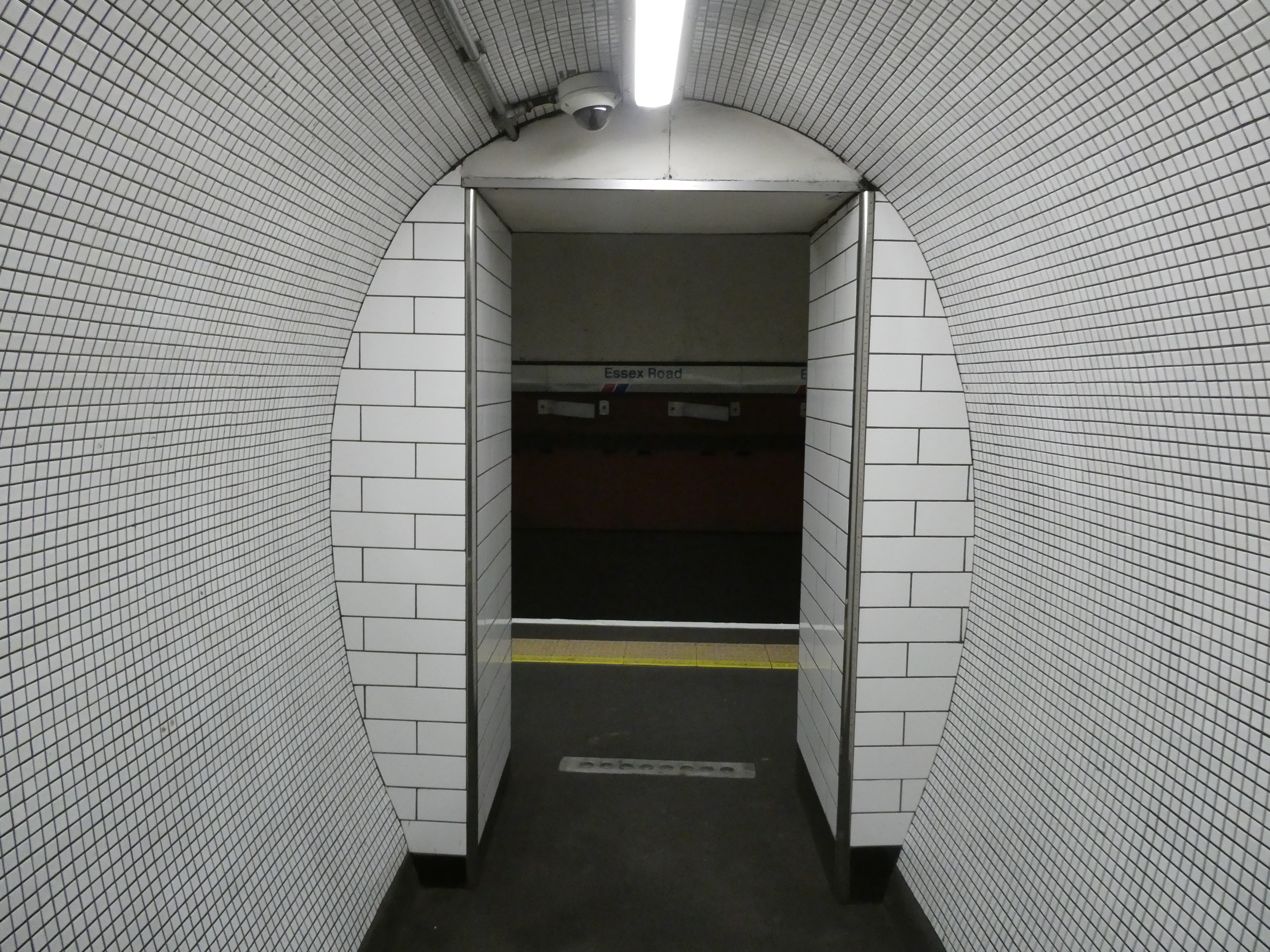
Architectural Detail In Essex Road Station

By comparison with other underground stations built at the beginning of the 20th century, the station's surface building is nondescript and unremarkable. Unlike many other central London underground stations, Essex Road was never modernised with escalators and access to the platforms is by lift or a spiral staircase. The station also lacks the automatic ticket gates present at most London Underground and many National Rail stations. Far fewer passengers use Essex Road station, only 0.77 million entries and exits during 2019–20, compared to nearby Angel tube station, with 17.7 million for 2019.

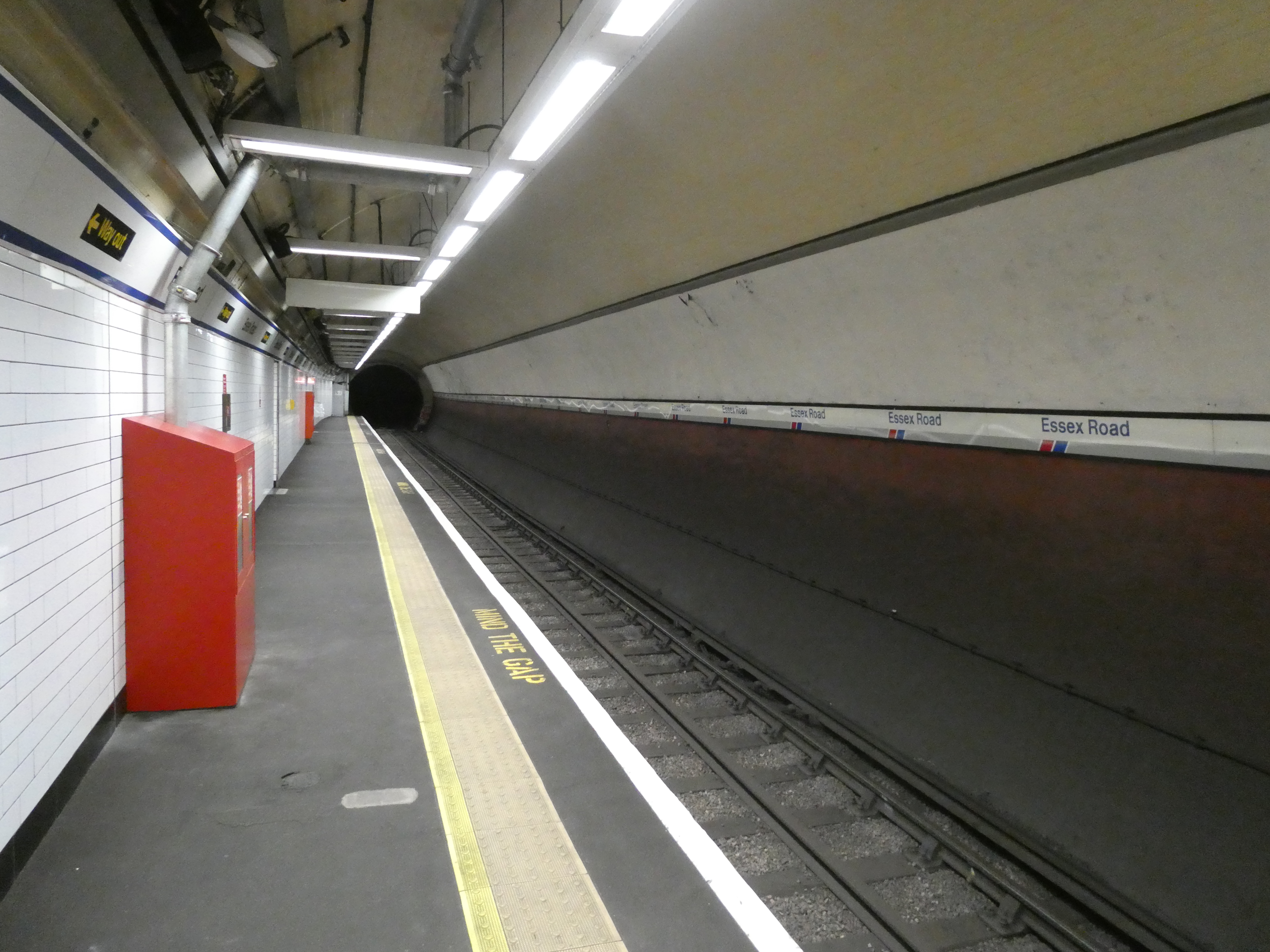
A view into the deep tunnel of Essex Road Station

At the lower level the lifts and staircase (of 156 steps) are connected to the platforms via a passageway and a short staircase rising between the two tunnels. The Underground's former operation of the station is evident from the unused and rusty fourth rail which once provided a return of the current from the tube trains serving the line. The third rail is still in use, with return now through the running rails. Signs at street and platform level use Helvetica and logos which still reference Network SouthEast, despite that brand being defunct for over 30 years.

== Services ==
All services at Essex Road are operated by Great Northern using Class 717 EMUs.

The typical off-peak service in trains per hour is:

- 4 tph to Moorgate
- 2 tph to Stevenage via Hertford North
- 2 tph to Welwyn Garden City

During the peak hours, the station is served by an additional half-hourly service between Moorgate and Hertford North and the service between Moorgate and Welwyn Garden City is increased to 4 tph.

Preceding station	National Rail	Following station
Highbury & Islington	Great Northern Northern City Line	Old Street
Former service
Preceding station	London Underground	Following station
Highbury & Islington towards Finsbury Park	Metropolitan line Northern City Branch (1913–39)	Old Street towards Moorgate
Highbury & Islington towards Finsbury Park	Northern line Northern City branch (1939–64)	Old Street towards Moorgate
Highbury & Islington towards Drayton Park	Northern line Northern City branch (1964–75)	Old Street towards Moorgate
Abandoned Northern Heights line
Highbury & Islington towards Bushey Heath, High Barnet or Alexandra Palace	Northern line	Old Street towards Moorgate

== Connections ==
London Buses routes 10, 21, 38, 56, 73, 341 and 476, and night routes N38, N73 and N263 serve the station.

== Future ==
Essex Road was a station on the proposed Chelsea-Hackney line. However, the scheme currently being pursued by the developers of Crossrail, known as Crossrail 2, does not provide for an interchange at Essex Road.
