= London Buses route 21 =

London bus route

21
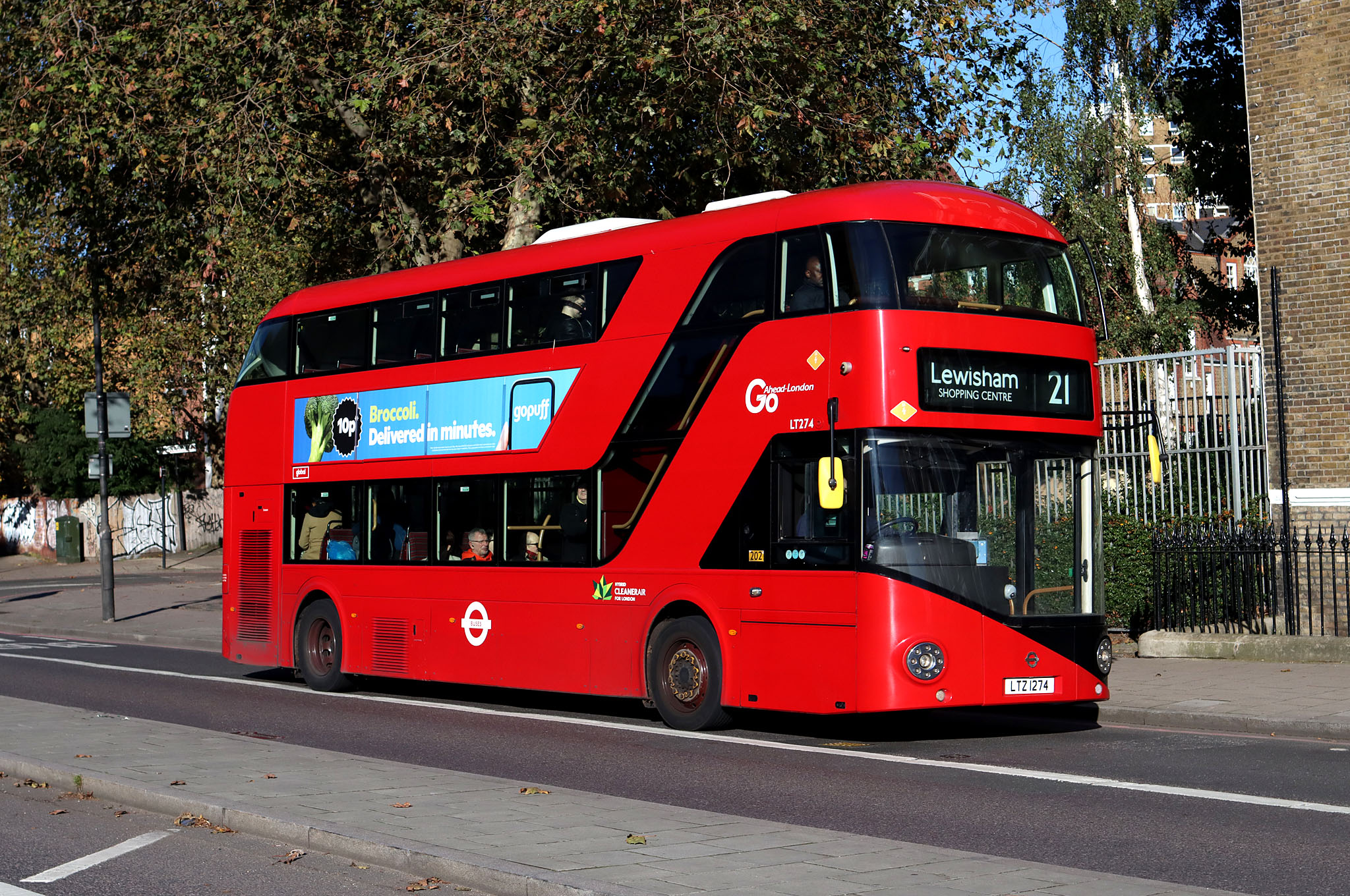
- London Central New Routemaster on Old Kent Road in November 2023

Overview
- Operator: London Central (Go-Ahead London)
- Garage: New Cross
- Vehicle: New Routemaster
- Night-time: N21

Route
- Start: Holloway
- Via: Moorgate; London Bridge; Bricklayers Arms; Old Kent Road; New Cross
- End: Lewisham Shopping Centre

London Buses route 21 is a Transport for London contracted bus route in London, England. Running between Holloway and Lewisham Shopping Centre, it is operated by Go-Ahead London subsidiary London Central.

== History ==
In 2018, an Optare MetroDecker EV prototype was trialed on the route.

In November 2021, the frequency of the service was reduced from 6-8 minutes to 8-10 minutes.

On 4 February 2023, route 21 was withdrawn between Newington Green and Hoxton and extended to Holloway partially replacing the daytime route 271, following a successful consultation in early 2022.

== Current route ==
Route 21 operates via these primary locations:

- Holloway
- Holloway Road station
- Highbury & Islington station
- Essex Road railway station
- Moorfields Eye Hospital
- Moorgate station
- Bank and Monument stations
- London Bridge station
- Borough station
- Bricklayers Arms
- Old Kent Road
- New Cross Gate station
- St Johns station
- Lewisham station
- Lewisham Shopping Centre

== Incident ==
On 1 April 2017, a number 21 bus blocked the street in Cornhill as it became stuck after mounting the curb during an attempted three-point turn.
